= Sandalwood =

Class of woods from trees in the genus Santalum

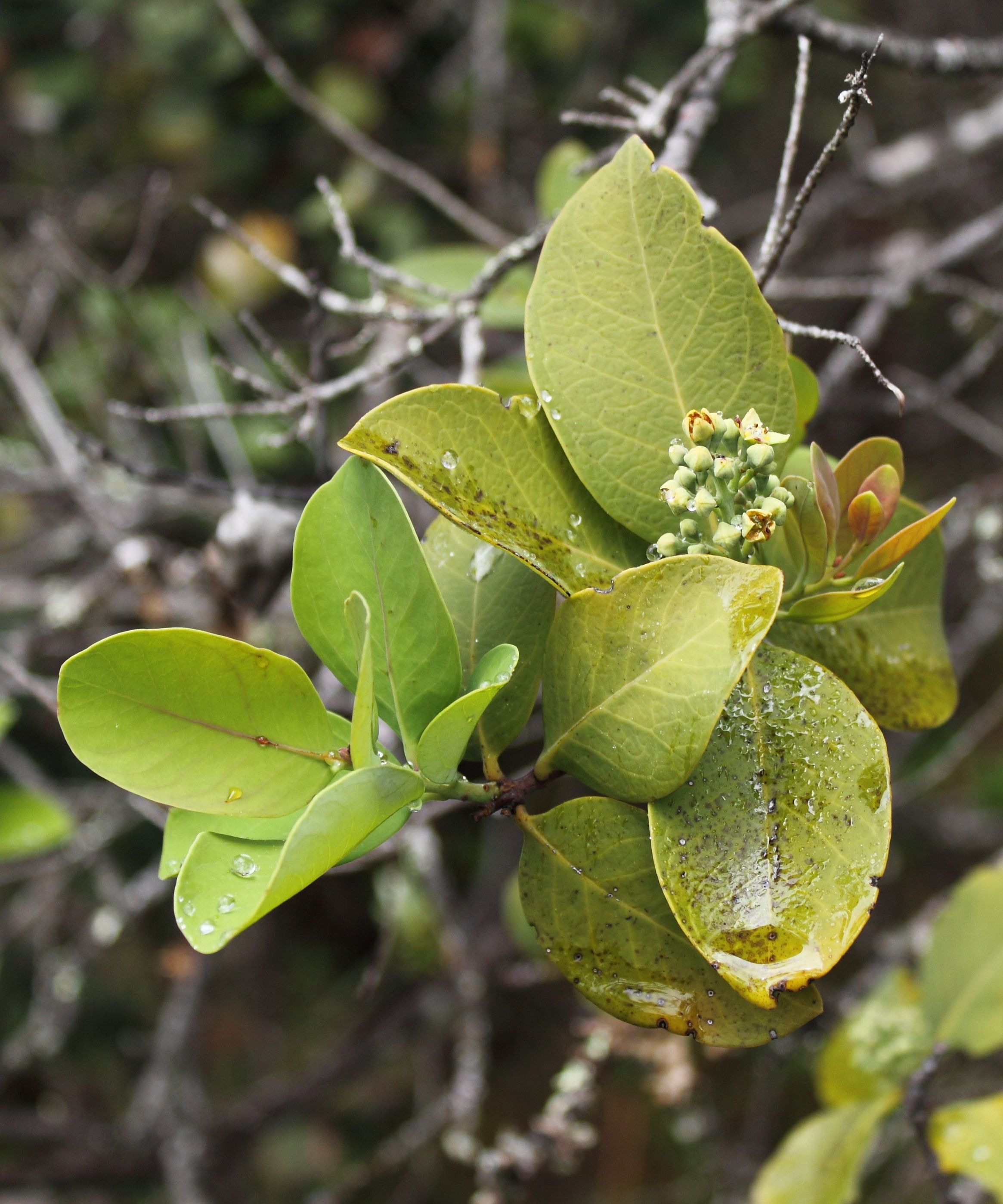
Santalum paniculatum (ʻiliahi), Hawaiʻi

Sandalwood is a class of woods from trees in the genus Santalum. The woods are heavy, yellow, and fine-grained, and, unlike many other aromatic woods, they retain their fragrance for decades. Sandalwood oil is extracted from the woods. Sandalwood is often cited as one of the most expensive woods in the world. Both the wood and the oil produce a distinctive fragrance that has been highly valued for centuries. Consequently, some species of these slow-growing trees have suffered over-harvesting in the past.

== Nomenclature ==
The nomenclature and the taxonomy of the genus are derived from this species' historical and widespread use. Etymologically it is ultimately derived from Sanskrit चन्दन Chandana (čandana), meaning "wood for burning incense" and related to candrah, "shining, glowing" and the Latin candere, to shine or glow. It arrived in English via Late Greek, Medieval Latin and Old French in the 14th or 15th century.

== True sandalwoods ==
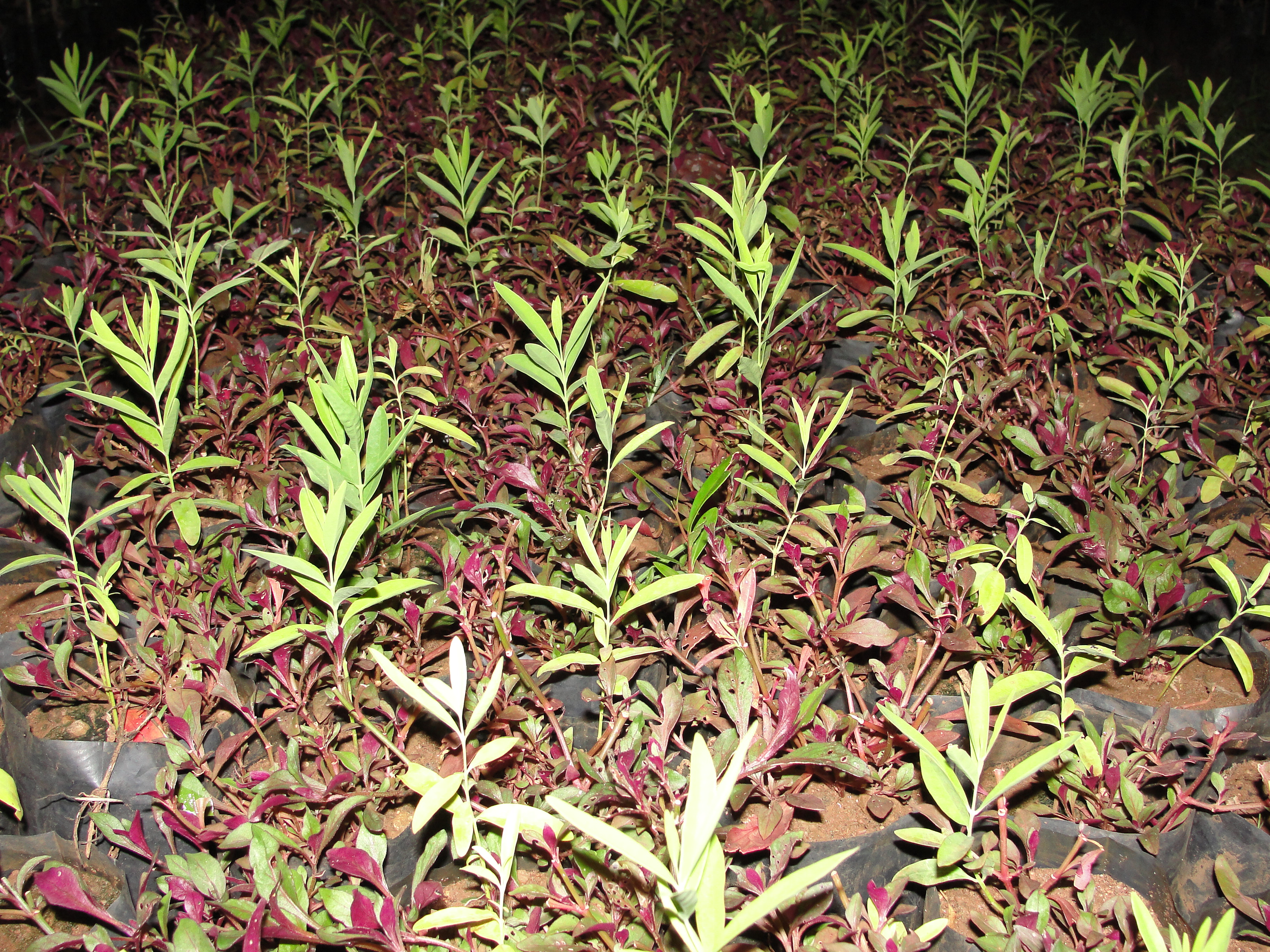
A closeup of sandal saplings

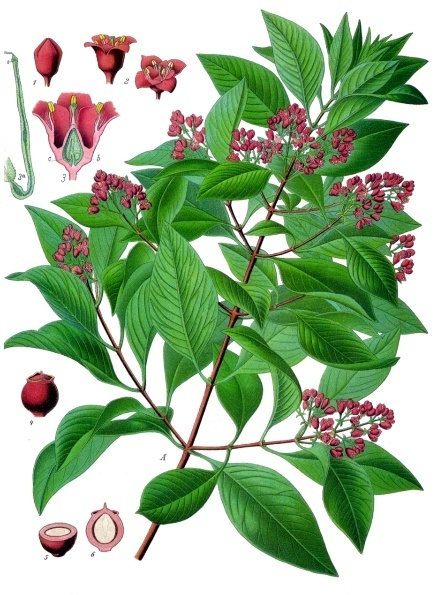
Santalum album

Sandalwoods are medium-sized hemiparasitic trees, and part of the same botanical family as European mistletoe. True sandalwoods are native to Insular Southeast Asia, Melanesia, Australia, and the Pacific Islands. The main cultivated species, Santalum album, were introduced in ancient times into mainland Asia by Austronesian traders and have since naturalized in South Asia, Mainland Southeast Asia, southeastern China, and Taiwan. The main distribution of both wild and introduced sandalwood trees are in the drier tropical regions of India and the Indonesian islands of Timor and Sumba.

S. album spread to other regions through the Austronesian maritime trade network, the incense trade route, and the Maritime Silk Road, until the sixteenth century CE. The sandalwood produced in peninsular India and the Malay Archipelago supported most consumption in East Asia and West Asia during the time of the incense trade route before the commercialization of Australian sandalwood (Santalum spicatum) in sandalwood plantations in Australia and China, although sandalwood album (Santalum album) is still considered to have the best and original quality in terms of religion and alternative medicine. Santalum spicatum is marketed as the notable member of this group today by merchants because of its stable sources; others in the genus also have fragrant wood.

- S. album is a threatened species native to dry tropical regions of Indonesia (Java and the Lesser Sunda Islands), the Philippines, and Western Australia. It was one of the plants exploited by Austronesian arboriculture and it was introduced by Austronesian sailors to Mainland Southeast Asia, South Asia and East Asia, during the ancient spice trade, becoming naturalized in South India by at least 1300 BCE. In India, the principal sandal tracts are most parts of Karnataka and adjoining districts of Maharashtra, Tamil Nadu, Kerala and Andhra Pradesh. The governments steward the land and regulate the harvest of sandalwood trees in India, Pakistan, and Nepal though many trees are illegally cut down. Sandalwood oil prices had risen to US$3,000 per liter by 2017.
- S. ellipticum, S. freycinetianum, and S. paniculatum, the Hawaiian sandalwood (ʻiliahi), were also used and considered high quality. These three species were exploited between 1790 and 1825 before the supply of trees ran out (a fourth species, S. haleakalae, occurs only in subalpine areas and was never exported). Although S. freycinetianum and S. paniculatum are relatively common today, they have not regained their former abundance or size, and S. ellipticum remains rare.
- S. yasi, a sandalwood from Fiji and Tonga.
- S. spicatum is used by aromatherapists and perfumers. The oil concentration differs considerably from other Santalum species. In the 1840s, sandalwood was Western Australia's biggest export earner. Oil was distilled for the first time in 1875, and by the turn of the 20th century, production of Australian sandalwood oil was intermittent. However, in the late 1990s, Western Australian sandalwood oil enjoyed a revival and by 2009 had peaked at more than 20,000 kg (44,100 lb) per year – much of which went to the fragrance industries in Europe. Although overall production has decreased, by 2011, a significant percentage of its production was heading to the chewing tobacco industry in India alongside Indian sandalwood – the chewing tobacco market being the largest market for both oils in 2012.
- Other species: Commercially, various other species, not belonging to Santalum species, are also used as "sandalwood."

=== Unrelated plants ===
Various unrelated plants with scented wood and also referred to as "sandalwood," but are not in the true sandalwood genus:

- Adenanthera pavonina – sandalwood tree, red or false red sandalwood
- Baphia nitida – camwood, also known as African sandalwood
- Eremophila mitchellii – sandalwood; false sandalwood (also sandalbox)
- Myoporum platycarpum – sandalwood; false sandalwood
- Myoporum sandwicense – bastard sandalwood, false sandalwood
- Osyris lanceolata – African sandalwood
- Osyris tenuifolia – east African sandalwood
- Pterocarpus santalinus – false red sandalwood growing in southern Indian regions

== Production ==
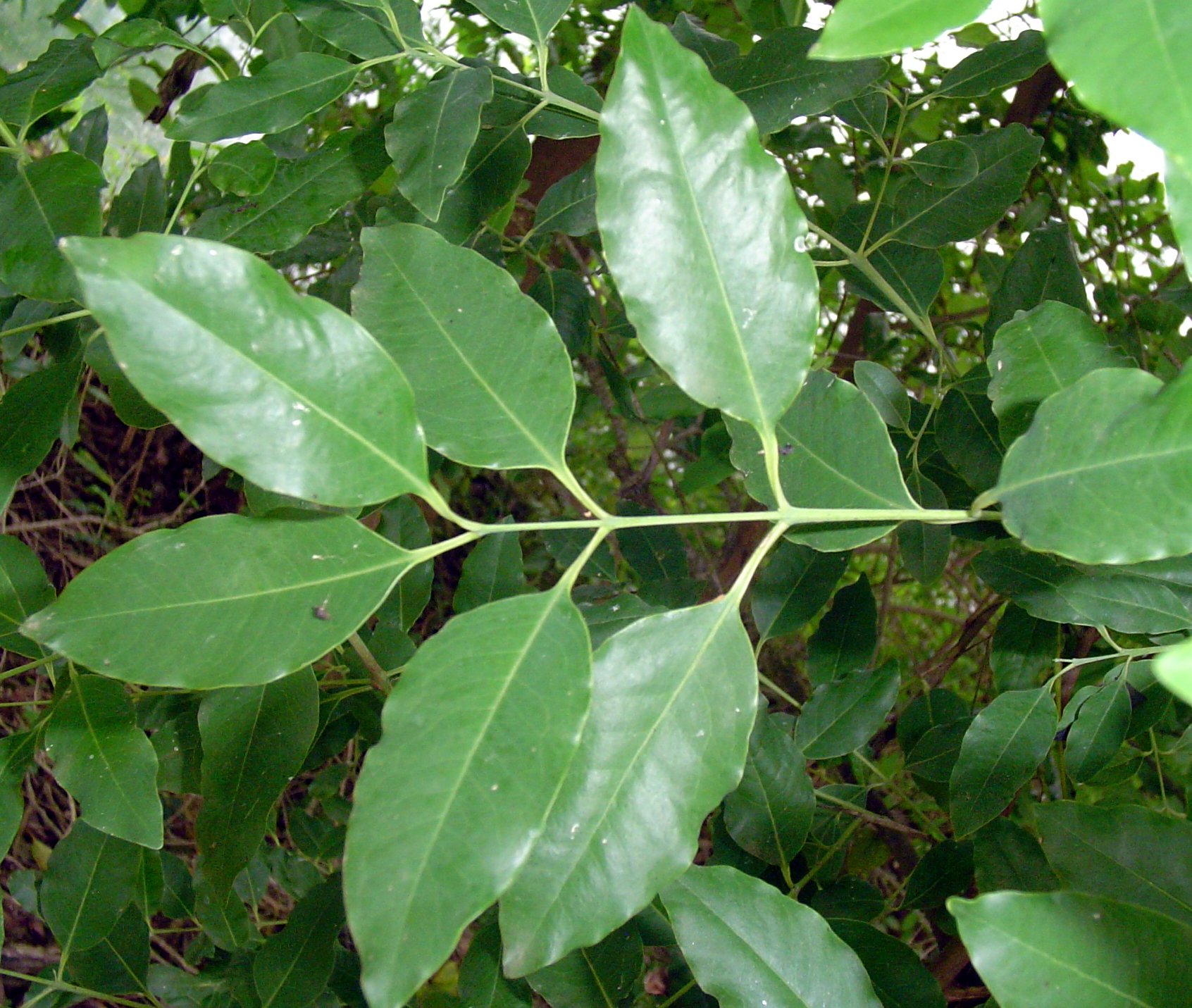
Sandalwood leaf

Producing commercially valuable sandalwood with high levels of fragrance oils requires Indian sandalwood (S. album) trees to be a minimum of 15 years old – the yield, quality and volume are yet to be clearly understood. Yield of oil tends to vary depending on the age and location of the tree; usually, the older trees yield the highest oil content and quality. India continues to produce a superior quality of Santalum Album, with FP Aromatics being the largest exporter. Australia is the largest producer of S. album, with the majority grown around Kununurra, in the far north of Western Australia by Quintis (formerly Tropical Forestry Services) – which in 2017 controlled around 80% of the world's supply of Indian sandalwood – and the Santanol Group. India used to be the world's biggest producer, but it has been overtaken by Australia in the 21st century. Over-exploitation is partly to blame for the decline. However, ethical plantations in India are on the rise, and India is expected to increase its supply manyfold by 2030, owing to favourable weather conditions and competitive pricing.

Australian sandalwood (S. spicatum) is grown in commercial plantations throughout the wheatbelt of Western Australia, where it has been an important part of the economy since colonial times. As of 2020 Western Australia has the largest plantation resource in the world.

Sandalwood is expensive compared to other types of woods. To maximize profit, sandalwood is harvested by removing the entire tree instead of felling at the trunk near ground level. This way wood from the stump and root, which possesses high levels of sandalwood oil, can also be processed and sold.

Australian sandalwood is mostly harvested and sold in log form, graded for heartwood content. The species is unique in that the white sapwood does not require removal before distilling the oil. The logs are either processed to distill the essential oil, or made into powders for making incense. Indian sandalwood, used mainly for oil extraction, does require removal of the sapwood prior to distillation. As of 2020, Australian sandalwood oil sold for around US$1,500 per 1 kilogram (2.2 lb), while Indian sandalwood oil, due to its higher alpha-santalol content, is priced at about US$2,500 per kg.

Sandalwood is often cited as one of the most expensive woods in the world, along with African blackwood, pink ivory, agarwood and ebony.

Sandalwood has historically been an important tree in the development of the political economy of the Pacific. Prior to colonization in the region, the sandalwood tree was a marker of status, rank and beauty. It then became an important part of the Pacific trade during the colonial period, as it was one of the few resources the West was able to successfully trade with Chinese merchants. This western trade began to put pressure on the production of sandalwood in the region.

Tonga, a Polynesian kingdom in the Oceania region, saw a collapse of its sandalwood tree population (locally known as ʻahi) due to the disruption of fahu, the hierarchical kinship-based social system which traditionally governed ʻahi harvest. When, in the early 1980s, a Chinese merchant willing to pay high prices arrived at the island of Haʻano, lower-ranking family members began to harvest the trees without permission, encouraging many farmers to harvest their trees defensively, leading to overharvest. Nearly all of the sandalwood resources on the island were depleted over the span of two years. Anthropologist Mike Evans concluded, "whatever the short-term ecological benefits of enforcing privatized land tenure, because private property not only fragments social ties by allowing an individual to deny others, it has the potential to fragment the regional ecology as well."

== Uses ==
=== Fragrance ===
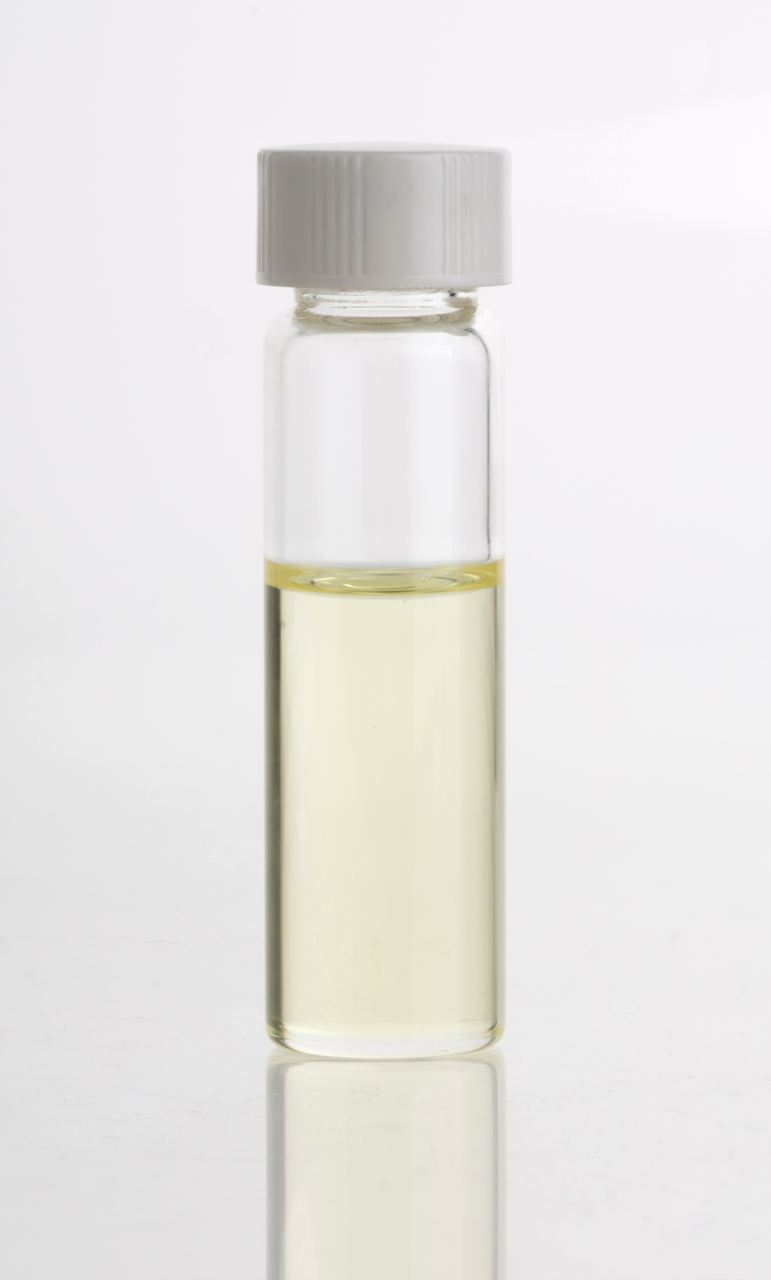
Sandalwood (S. album) essential oil

Sandalwood oil has a distinctive soft, warm, smooth, creamy, and milky precious-wood scent. Its quality and scent profile is greatly influenced by the age of the tree, location and the skill of the distiller. It imparts a long-lasting, woody base to perfumes from the oriental, woody, fougère, and chypre families, as well as a fixative to floral and citrus fragrances. When used in smaller proportions in a perfume, it acts as a fixative, enhancing the longevity of other, more volatile, materials in the composite. Sandalwood is also a key ingredient in the "floriental" (floral-ambery) fragrance family – when combined with white florals such as jasmine, ylang ylang, gardenia, plumeria, orange blossom, tuberose, lily of the valley, etc. Its also acts as a versatile base that blends well with other woody scents like patchouli and cedar.

Sandalwood oil in India is widely used in the cosmetic industry. The main source of true sandalwood, S. album, is a protected species, and demand for it cannot be met. Many species of plants are traded as "sandalwood". The genus Santalum has more than 19 species. Traders often accept oil from closely related species, as well as from unrelated plants such as West Indian sandalwood (Amyris balsamifera) in the family Rutaceae or bastard sandalwood (Myoporum sandwicense, Myoporaceae). However, most woods from these alternative sources lose their aroma within a few months or years.

Isobornyl cyclohexanol is a synthetic fragrance chemical produced as an alternative to the natural product.

Sandalwood's main components are the two isomers of santalol (about 75%). It is used in aromatherapy, in scented candles and to prepare soaps.

=== Idols/sculptures ===
Sandalwood lends itself well to carving and has thus, traditionally, been a wood of choice for statues and sculptures of Hindu gods.

=== Technology ===
Due to its low fluorescence and optimal refractive index, sandalwood oil is often employed as an immersion oil within ultraviolet and fluorescence microscopy.

=== Food ===
Aboriginal Australians eat the seed kernels, nuts, and fruit of local sandalwoods, such as the quandong (S. acuminatum). Early Europeans in Australia used quandong in cooking damper by infusing it with its leaves, and in making jams, pies, and chutneys from the fruit. In Scandinavia, pulverised bark from red sandalwood (Pterocarpus soyauxii) is used—with other tropical spices—when marinating anchovies and some types of pickled herring such as matjes, sprat, and certain types of traditional spegesild, inducing a reddish colour and slightly perfumed flavour.

Present-day chefs have begun experimenting in using the nut as a substitute for macadamia nuts or a bush food substitute for almonds, hazelnuts, and others in Southeast Asian-styled cuisine. The oil is also used as a flavour component in different food items, including candy, ice cream, baked food, puddings, alcoholic and nonalcoholic beverages, and gelatin. The flavouring is used at levels below 10 ppm, the highest possible level for use in food products being 90 ppm.

== Distillation ==
Oil is extracted from sandalwood through distillation. Many different methods are used, including steam distillation, water distillation, CO_{2} extraction, and solvent extractions. Steam distillation is the most common method used by sandalwood companies. It occurs in a four-step process, incorporating boiling, steaming, condensation, and separation. Water is heated to high temperatures (60–100 °C or 140–212 °F) and is then passed through the wood. The oil is very tightly bound within the cellular structure of the wood, but can be released by the high heat of the steam. The mixture of steam and oil is then cooled and separated so that the essential oil can be collected. This process is much longer than any other essential oil's distillation, taking 14 to 36 hours to complete, but generally produces much higher quality oil. Water, or hydro, distillation is the more traditional method of sandalwood extraction which involves soaking the wood in water and then boiling it until the oil is released. This method is not used as much anymore because of the high costs and time associated with heating large quantities of water.

== Religion ==
=== Hinduism ===
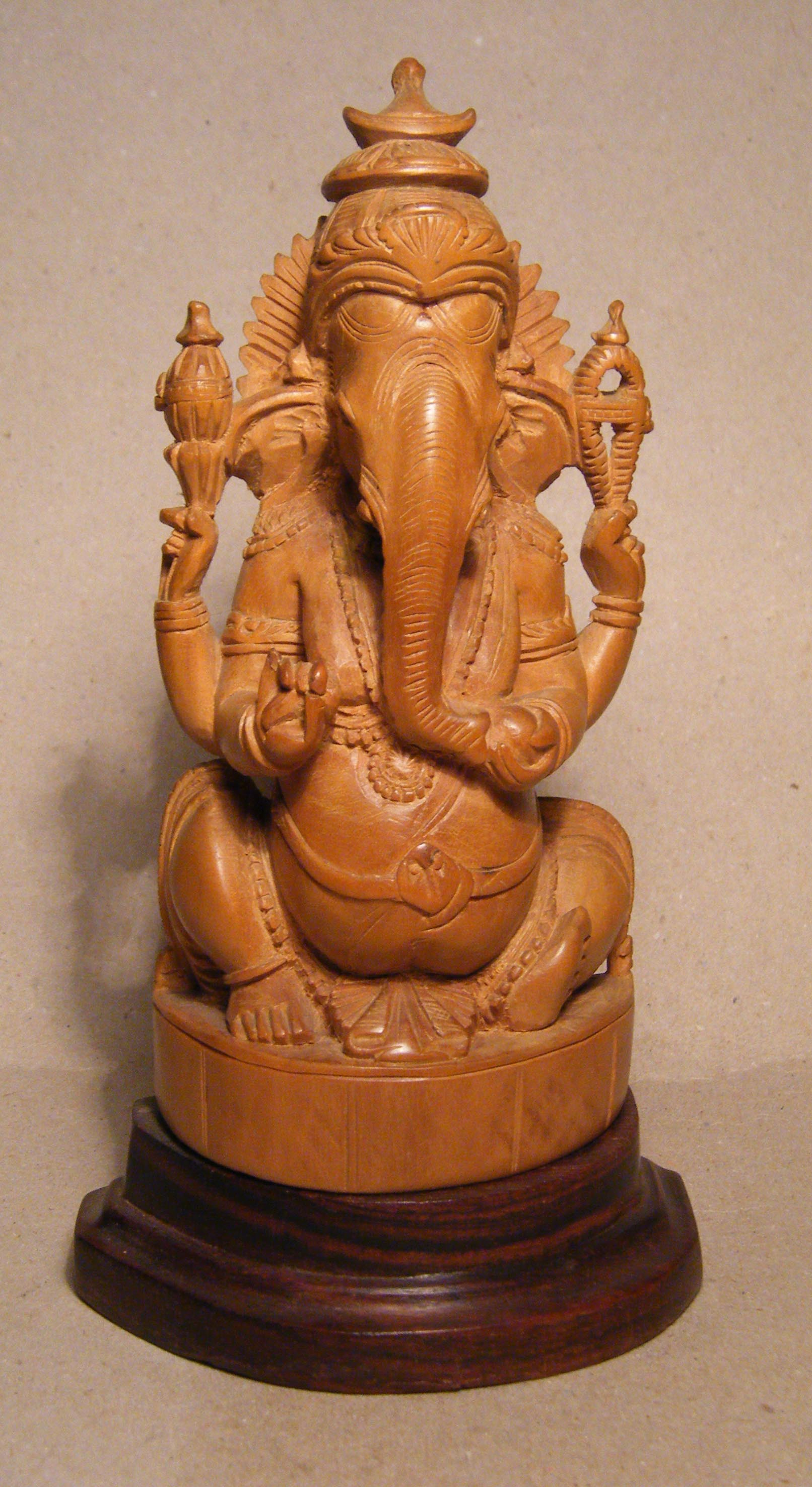
Sandalwood carved statue of Ganesha

Sandalwood is considered sacred in Hindu traditions and Ayurveda and is known in Sanskrit as chandana. The wood is used for worshipping deities, and it is said that Lakshmi (Sri), the goddess of well-being, resides in the sandalwood tree; therefore, it is also known as Srigandha.

Sandalwood paste is prepared by grinding a piece of dry sandalwood into powder, against a stone slab. With the gradual addition of water, a thick paste forms, (called kalabham "കളഭം" in Malayalam language and gandha ಗಂಧ in Kannada) and it is mixed with saffron or other such pigments to make chandanam. Chandanam, further mixed with herbs, perfumes, pigments, and some other compounds, results in javadhu. Kalabham, chandanam, and javadhu are dried and used as kalabham powder, chandanam powder, and javadhu powder, respectively. Chandanam powder is very popular in India and is also used in Nepal.

In Tirupati, after religious tonsure, sandalwood paste is applied to protect the skin. In Hinduism and Ayurveda, sandalwood is thought to bring one closer to the divine. Thus, it is one of the most used holy elements in Hindu and Vedic societies. This paste is integral to rituals and ceremonies, for making religious utensils, for decorating sacred images, and it is believed to calm the mind during meditation and prayer. It is also distributed to devotees, who apply it to their foreheads or necks and chests. Sandalwood paste is used in most pujas performed in both temples and private households.

=== Jainism ===
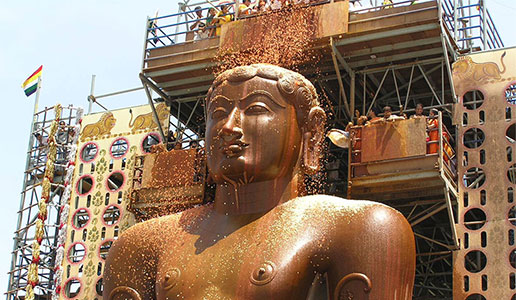
Mahamastakabhisheka at Shravanabelagola

Sandalwood use is an integral part of the daily practices of Jainism. Sandalwood paste mixed with saffron is used to worship the Tirthankaras of Jainism. Sandalwood powder is showered as blessings by Jain monks and nuns (sadhus and sadhvis) onto their disciples and followers. Sandalwood garlands are used to dress the body during Jain cremation ceremonies. During the festival of Mahamastakabhisheka that is held once in every 12 years, the Gommateshwara statue is bathed and anointed with libations such as milk, sugarcane juice, and saffron paste, and sprinkled with powders of sandalwood, turmeric, and vermilion.

=== Buddhism ===
Sandalwood is mentioned in various suttas of the Pāli Canon. In some Buddhist traditions, sandalwood is considered to be of the padma (lotus) group and attributed to Amitabha Buddha. Sandalwood scent is believed by some to transform one's desires and maintain a person's alertness while in meditation. It is also one of the most popular scents used when offering incense to the Buddha and the guru.

=== Sufism ===
In the Indian variants of Sufism, sandalwood paste is applied on a revered Sufi's grave by the disciples as a mark of devotion. The tradition is practiced particularly by devotees in the Indian subcontinent. In Tamil culture, irrespective of one's religious identity, sandalwood paste or powder is applied to the graves of Sufi saints as a mark of devotion and respect.

=== East Asian religions ===
In East Asia, sandalwood (檀木) is the most commonly used incense material by the Chinese, Korean and Japanese in worship and various ceremonies. Some Taoist sects, following the Ming Dynasty Taoist Manual, avoid the use of sandalwood (as well as benzoin resin and frankincense) as incense in worship. In Korean Shamanism, sandalwood is considered the Tree of Life. It was transmitted to China, the Korean Peninsula, and Japan during the eastward expansion of Buddhism.

=== Zoroastrianism ===
Zoroastrians offer sandalwood twigs to the afarganyu, the urn in which the fire is kept at the fire temple (called agiyari in Gujarati and dar-e mehr in Persian), to keep the fire burning during religious ceremonies. After the firekeeping priests complete the ceremony, attendees are allowed to come up to the afarganyu and place their own pieces of sandalwood into the fire. Fire has been a sacred symbol in the Zoroastrian religion since ancient times and it is considered very important to keep the fires in the temples constantly burning. Because of its high sensitivity to fire, sandalwood works very well for this. Also, the wood has been accepted by the Yasna and Yashts (sacred texts) as an appropriate fuel for the fire. It is offered to all of the three grades of fire in the fire temple, including the Atash Dadgahs. Sandalwood is not offered to the divo, a smaller lamp that is kept in the homes of Zoroastrians. Often, money is offered to the mobad (priest) as payment, along with sandalwood. Sandalwood is called sukhad in the Zoroastrian community. The sandalwood in the fire temple is often more expensive to buy than at a Zoroastrian store. It is often a source of income for the fire temple.

== See also ==
- Sandalore
