= Sandal spike phytoplasma =

Tree disease

- Common names: Spike disease
- Causal agents: Phytoplasma
- Hosts: Sandal (Santalum album)
- Vectors: Leaf hopper: Jassus indicus
- Distribution: India

Sandalwood (Santalum album. L), a semi-root parasitic tree is the source of the East Indian sandalwood and oil. Spike disease caused by phytoplasma is the major disease of sandalwood.

The disease is noticed in all major sandal-growing states of India. Spike disease is characterized by extreme reduction in leaf size accompanied by stiffening and reduction of internode length. In advanced stage, the entire shoot gives the appearance of a spike inflorescence. Spiked trees die within one–two years after the appearance of visible symptoms. The pathogen, sandal spike phytoplasma, was first detected by electron microscopy in 1969. Phytoplasmas are pleomorphic and fragile organisms occupying relatively small areas within the sieve tubes (phloem) of the host plants. The major obstacle limiting research on phytoplasma disease is that the organism has not so far been isolated and cultivated in vitro.

Sandal spike phytoplasma is a pleomorphic microorganism and are the smallest organism capable of independent replication (i.e. does not need a host). The pathogen is around 0.4 to 1.0 micrometer in diameter, has a cell membrane, ribosome and DNA. The amino acids cysteine, methionine and tryptophan are absent in sandal spike phytoplasma.

== Detection of sandal spike phytoplasma ==
For non-specific detection of sandal spike phytoplasma by light microscopy Giemsa and Dienes’ stain are employed. Aniline blue, Hoechst 33258 and DAPI stain are used in the non-specific detection by fluorescence microscopy.

Scientists at Kerala Forest Research Institute, India had reported employing the polymerase chain reaction technique for detecting sandal spike phytoplasma. The pathogen belongs to group I of the major phytoplasma groups.

For raising polyclonal antibodies against sandal spike phytoplasma, the pathogen is purified by differential filtration technique. The antibody thus raised detects the pathogen by ELISA, Dot Immuno Binding Assay and Immuno-microscopy.
