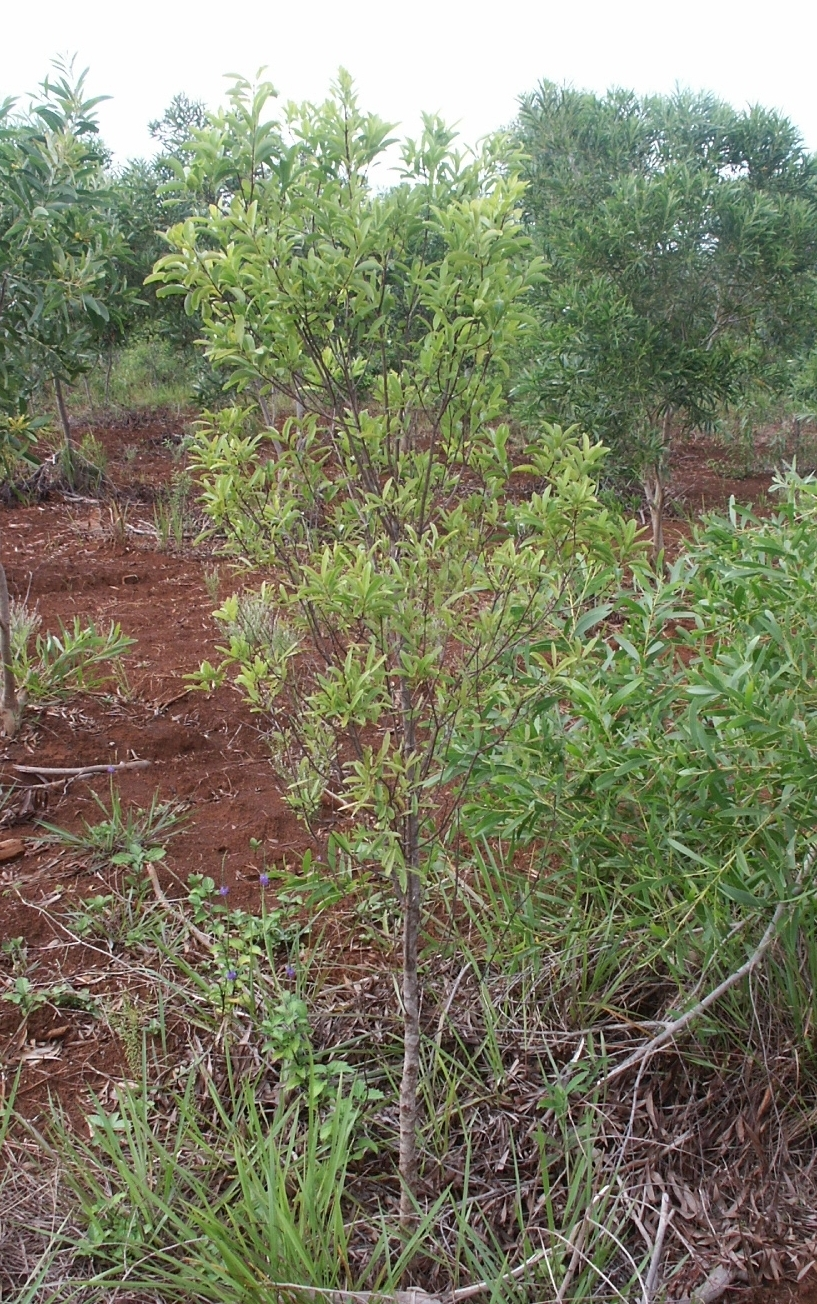
- Specimen on the Ile des Pins

Scientific classification
- Kingdom: Plantae
- Clade: Tracheophytes
- Clade: Angiosperms
- Clade: Eudicots
- Order: Santalales
- Family: Santalaceae
- Genus: Santalum
- Species: S. austrocaledonicum

Binomial name
- Santalum austrocaledonicum Vieill. 1861

= Santalum austrocaledonicum =

Species of tree

Santalum austrocaledonicum, or New Caledonia sandalwood, is a sandalwood tree from the family Santalaceae. It is a small tree with gray bark and green leaves, and is parasitic. Most have been removed from their habitat due to logging; very few trees remain in the wild.

== Nomenclature ==
The species was described in 1861 by Eugène Vieillard. It falls into the family Santalaceae, and shares the genus Santalum with such important species as S. album. The species also includes three variations, S. A. austrocaledonicum, S. A. pilosulum, and S. A. minutum. The Kanaks call the tree "Tibo".

== Characteristics ==
Santalum austrocaledonicum typically grows 5 to 12 metres (16 to 39 ft) tall, and around 4 to 8 metres (13 to 26 ft) wide. The trees flower after 6–7 years, and fruit matures in about 3 months. Typically, the fruit outnumbers the flowers by 10 to 1. The trees have gray bark, and short branches bearing light-green leaves. They are considered semi-parasitic in their early stages: their roots drink the sap of their host plant.

== Conservation ==
The tree's native habitat is on the islands of New Caledonia, as well as Vanuatu; very little remains of it in its natural habitat, due to logging. During the 1840s, Sandalwood traders came to New Caledonia and began taking wood, both of S. austrocaledonicum and various trees of the genus Agathis, off the islands at the rate of 8,000,000 kilograms (8,000 t) in the first 15 years. In 1987, so much wood had been cut from Vanuatu that in January the government imposed restrictions on the amount of wood that could be logged. In the past decade, 726,000 kilograms (726 t) of wood had been removed from Vanuatu's forests. The land was never reforested correctly, due to ownership disputes; and the tree is very slow to reforest itself. Because of this, only around 20% of New Caledonia's land contains original forests. As of 2006, the species only grew in small lots where it had been planted.
