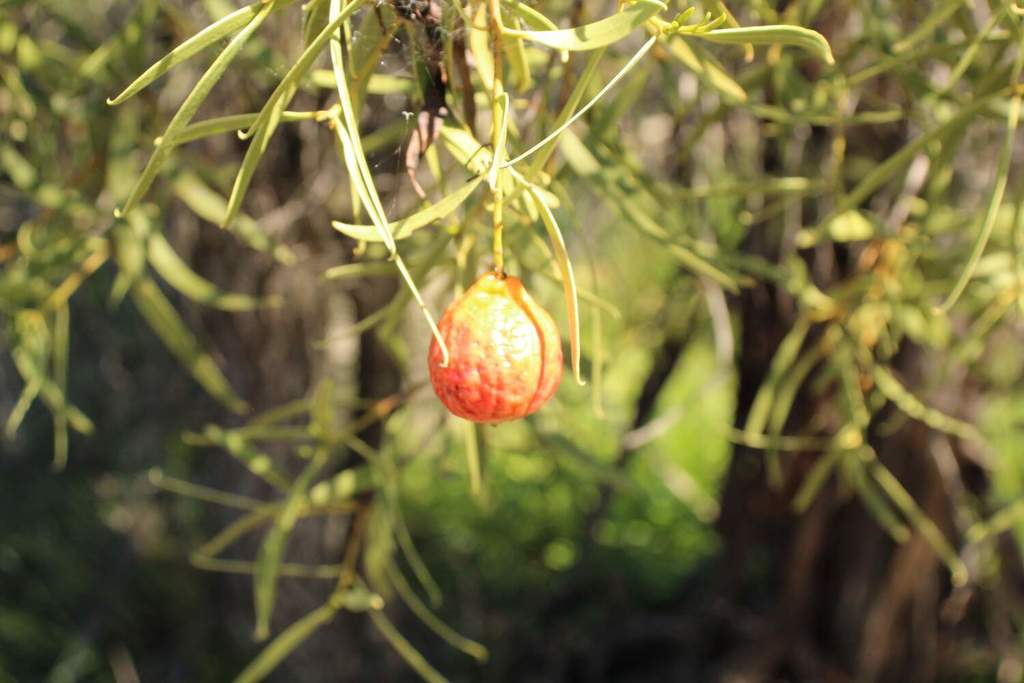

Scientific classification
- Kingdom: Plantae
- Clade: Tracheophytes
- Clade: Angiosperms
- Clade: Eudicots
- Order: Santalales
- Family: Santalaceae
- Genus: Santalum
- Species: S. murrayanum

Binomial name
- Santalum murrayanum C.A.Gardner

= Santalum murrayanum =

Species of plant

Santalum murrayanum, commonly known as the bitter quandong, is an Australian plant in the sandalwood family, Santalaceae. The Noongar name for the plant is coolyar.

It bears a bitter fruit, from which a common name derives, in contrast to congener Santalum acuminatum - sweet quandong. The plant is also known as Ming. It occurs in a hemi-parasitic relationship with the roots of several other plants, in a non-destructive way, as with all the species of the genus Santalum.

The shrub or small tree typically grows to a height of 1 to 5 metres (3 to 16 ft). It blooms between October and January producing white to yellow-green flowers. It is found on sandplains and dunes and has a scattered distribution through the Wheatbelt, Great Southern and Goldfields-Esperance regions of Western Australia where it grows in sandy or gravelly lateritic soils.
