= Santalum boninense =

Scientific classification
- Kingdom: Plantae
- Clade: Tracheophytes
- Clade: Angiosperms
- Clade: Eudicots
- Order: Santalales
- Family: Santalaceae
- Genus: Santalum
- Species: S. boninense

Binomial name
- Santalum boninense (Nakai) Tuyama

Synonyms
- Exocarpos boninensis Nakai

Species of flowering plant

Santalum boninense, commonly known as the Bonin sandalwood, is a species of tree in the family Santalaceae. It is found on the Bonin Islands in Japan. Its flowers are small, white and bell-shaped.
