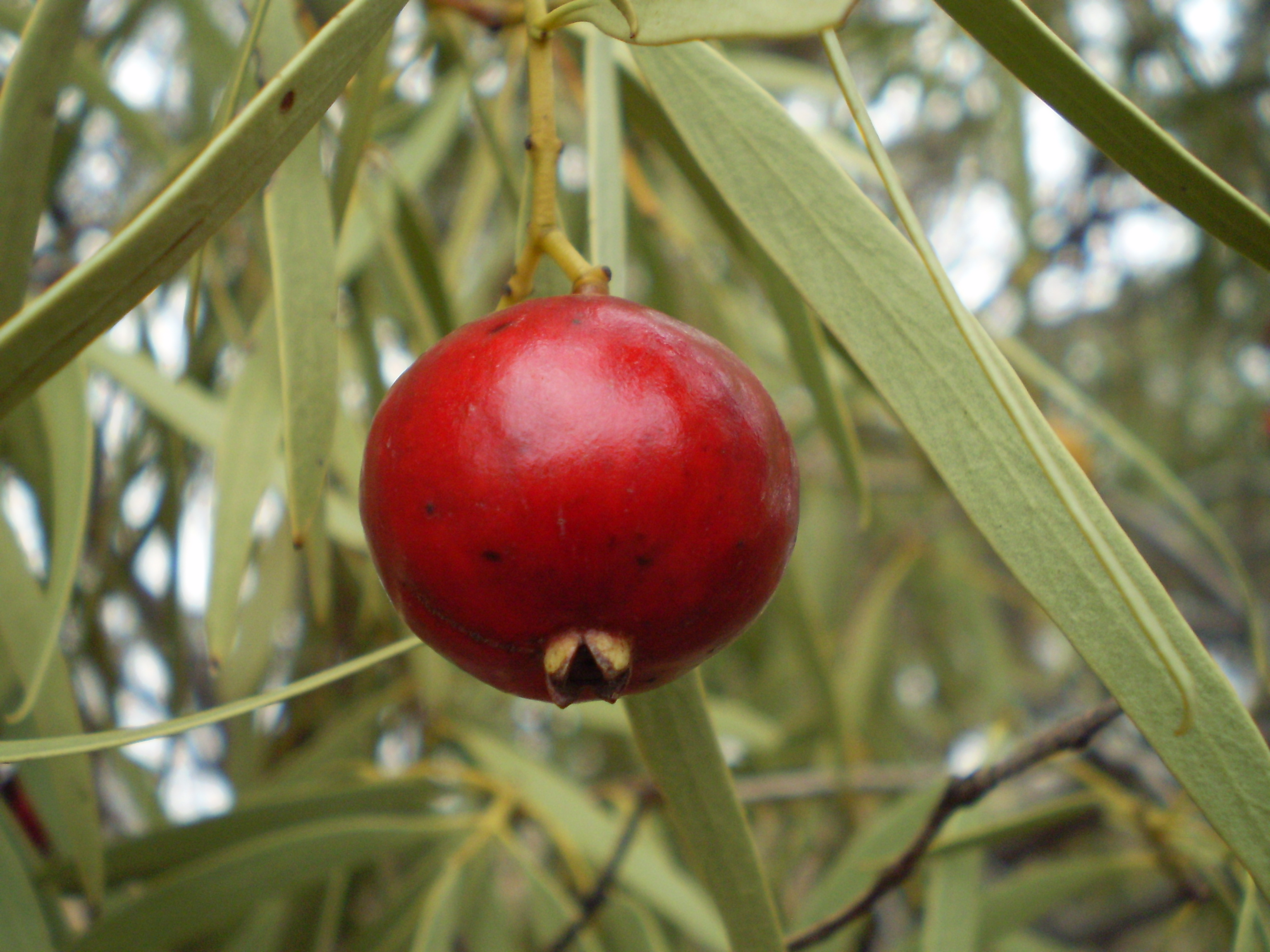

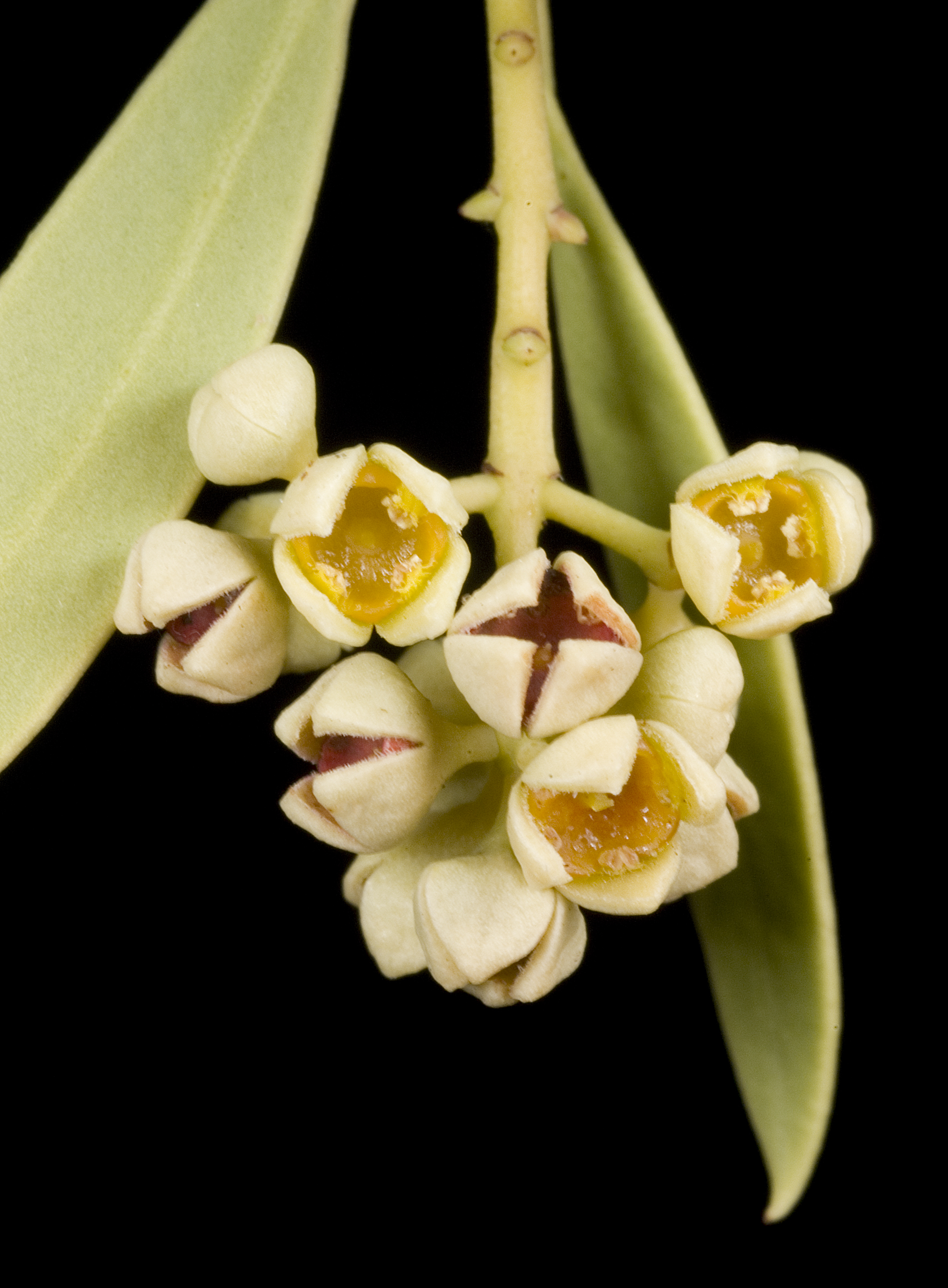

Scientific classification
- Kingdom: Plantae
- Clade: Tracheophytes
- Clade: Angiosperms
- Clade: Eudicots
- Order: Santalales
- Family: Santalaceae
- Genus: Santalum
- Species: S. acuminatum

Binomial name
- Santalum acuminatum A.DC.

= Santalum acuminatum =

Species of plant

Santalum acuminatum, the desert quandong, is an evergreen, hemiparasitic tree in the sandalwood family, Santalaceae, which is widely dispersed throughout the central deserts and southern areas of Australia.

The tree's fruit, known as quandongs or native peaches, are used as bush tucker and as an exotic flavouring, which has led to attempts to domesticate the tree. The fruit can be stewed to make filling for quandong pies or made into a fruit juice drink. The kernels inside the stones of the fruit can be crushed into a paste and then used on sore gums or gum boils to ease the pain. Because it is one of the few drought-tolerant fruit trees in far-west New South Wales, the tree is widely utilised by Australian Aboriginals.

== Description ==
Santalum acuminatum grows as a tall shrub, or small tree, 4 to 6 m (13 to 20 ft) high and 2–4 m (6.6–13.1 ft) wide. The rough bark is dark grey and the branches ascending in character. Smaller plants formed by suckers from the roots are sometimes found surrounding larger plants. The smaller branches have a more weeping habit. The slender to ovate leaves are pointed at the tip, and are pale yellowish-green bringing a slightly grey and leathery appearance. These are supported on a short leaf stem, 5 – 10 mm long, the leaves themselves being 45 – 115 mm long. They are tapered in outline, and arranged in opposite pairs on the branchlets.

Flowers can be green or creamy white on the outer parts, reddish or yellowish brown on the inner faces; these appear on stems, are just 2–3 mm across, and are fragrant. Fruit is produced after 4 years and is red or sometimes yellow, measuring between 20 and 25 mm across. A 3-mm layer of flesh covers a brain-like nut with a hard shell that encases the seed. This fruit is referred to as a drupe. It ripens from green to a shiny red in late spring or summer, and is globe-shaped and 20 to 40 mm across. The skin of the fruit is waxy.

Roots are adapted to a hemiparasitic mechanism, using a haustorium, on roots able to reach out 10 m to other root systems.

== Taxonomy and naming ==
The species shares the common name quandong with other plants, bearing similar fruit; it may be distinguished as the "desert" or "sweet". The name quandong usually refers to the fruit of S. acuminatum in commercial usage. Variant spelling includes quondong and quandang. The fruit and plant are also named sweet quandong and native peach. The plant was known to many different indigenous language groups, and is therefore known by many different names. The Wiradjuri people of New South Wales use the name guwandhang, from which the name quandong was adapted. Other indigenous names include; wolgol (Noongar, South Western Australia) gutchu (Wotjobaluk, Western Victoria); wanjanu or mangata (Pitjantjatjara, Uluru), and goorti (Narungga).

The species was first described by Robert Brown, named in Prodromus Florae Novae Hollandiae (1810) as Fusanus acuminatus, based on his type collection made at Fowlers Bay, South Australia, in 1802. Brown gave the Latin epithet acuminatus to denote the leaves – sharpened or pointed. The botanist Alphonse Pyrame de Candolle gave the current name in 1857, placing it in the genus Santalum; the genus containing Australian sandalwood, Santalum spicatum, and white sandalwood, Santalum album. Several botanical names have been deemed to be synonymous with Santalum acuminatum, as described in Flora of Australia (1984) and the Australian Plant Census (2006), these include: Santalum preissii F.Muell. in Fragmenta Phytographiae Australiae (1861); Santalum cognatum and Santalum preissianum of Miquel (1845); and Santalum densiflorum Gand. (1919).

Mida acuminata was given by Otto Kuntze in an attempted revision, as with Eucarya acuminata (R.Br.) Sprague and Summerh.

A number of cultivars have been named in application for plant breeders' rights, of which two have been accepted and another has been granted. The first named cultivar of the species was named Powell's # 1, but application for legal recognition of this name was withdrawn. The second is known as Powell's Red Supreme. Two names are given as accepted applications in the Plant Varieties Journal: Powell's Red Supreme and Saltbush Lane.

One variety of S. acuminatum is named in accordance with the International Code of Nomenclature for Cultivated Plants; following the publication of a description, Santalum acuminatum 'Frahn's Paringa Gem' became the first cultivar to be receive legal protection.

== Distribution ==
Santalum acuminatum is widely distributed throughout most southern regions of mainland Australia, including the arid centre of the country, and in some regions is common. The related Australian sandalwood, Santalum spicatum, was once more populous than this species; commercial exploitation has reversed this position.

The plant occurs in Western Australia's north to Carnarvon and Karratha (21 N), reaching inland from the coastal plains, and is found throughout Southwest Australia. The number of recorded specimens in this region is low, and mainly restricted to coastal sandplains, its range having been impacted by altered land-use in the wheatbelt. Some populations are discontinuous in the distribution range, as with many species of the region, beyond the dispersal range of the seeds. Remote groups of the species are remnant to former distribution ranges, to different climates, and these may be isolated by hundreds of kilometres. The species is one of those in the region to include "wet outliers", small populations outside of the usual low rainfall habitat.

Occurrence of the plant is also recorded in South Australia, Victoria, and New South Wales, and Queensland. It is widespread in western New South Wales, eastwards to Dubbo and Culcairn. It is rare in the northwest of the state.

== Ecology ==
Like other members of its genus, the plant is hemiparasitic, able to photosynthesize, but using the root system of other plants to acquire nutrients other than sugars. The plant genus Santalum attaches to other species, in a nondestructive way, sustaining itself by their provision of nitrogen, shade, and water. The roots of the species have pad-like adaptations, that nearly encircle the host's root, which is typical of this genus of sandalwoods. Hosts can be other trees, or grasses, usually several plants are used. The taxa recorded in this relationship are species of genera; Acacia, Maireana, Atriplex, and many others, including hemiparasites such as Exocarpos sparteus. This mechanism allows the plant to acquire 70% of its nitrogen, and some of its water requirements from the roots of other trees and shrubs.

The tree occupies a diverse and widespread range of habitats, including creek beds, granite, gravel plains, and sandy dunes. It is tolerant of drought, salt, and high temperatures, and need not have a nutrient-rich environment. The seedling can become established in the shade of its host, reaching for full sun once developed, so the plant is usually intermingled with host and other species.

The environs of the distribution range are subject to frequent bushfires, this requires the plant to regenerate from its roots, so the species is rarely found as an advanced tree. Those specimens exposed to bushfire and soil disturbance occur as sprawling multistemmed shrubs. The plant's regrowth from the root system gives this species a lead over shrubs that recur from seed. Trees with a single main stem are in locations remote from these factors. The habit of older trees may overwhelm the adjacent plants by monopolising the sunlight and parasitising roots of plants beyond its own canopy.

The foliage, being much paler than other trees and shrubs, makes the plant conspicuous in bushland and scrub. An occurrence of an unmolested specimen is recorded at Woodman Point in Western Australia, an area remote from the high-intensity fires of altered regimens.

Emus eat the fruit, and it forms an important part of their diet; the nut remains undigested in their droppings. This is the usual method of S. acuminatum seed dispersal, when it is within the emu's range.

A number of species interact with this plant, in a number of complex relationships, a noted example being Paraepermenia santaliella, the quandong moth of the family Epermeniidae. Other creatures, such as larvae of nitidulid beetles and the wood white butterfly, also feed on S. acuminatum.

== Cultivation ==
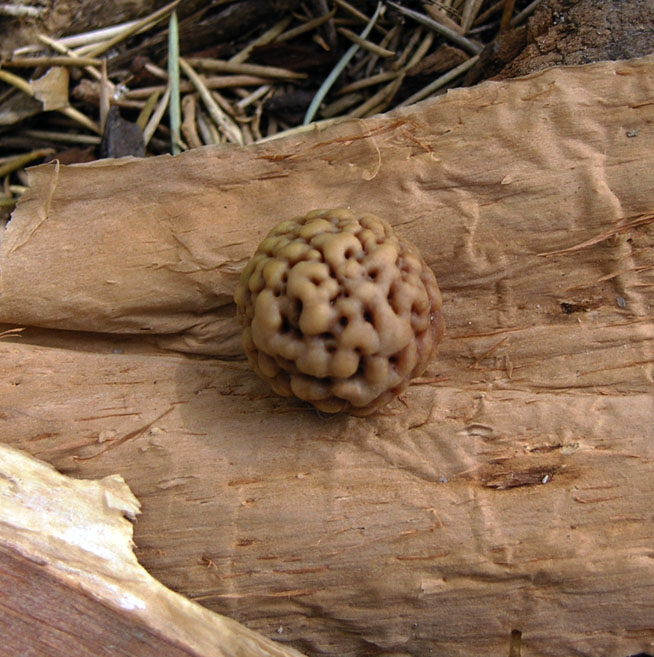
A desert quandong nut on a piece of paperbark

The fruit and nut were important foods to the peoples of arid and semiarid central Australia, especially for its high vitamin C content. It is commercially grown and marketed as a bush food and is sometimes made into a jam, an enterprise begun in the 1970s. It is well known as an exotic food.

=== Propagation and pests ===
Inadequate knowledge of the plant's ecology led to many early failures in the cultivation of this species. Commercial trials and propagation by enthusiasts have attempted to reproduce the circumstances of its native habitat; well-drained soil, germination techniques, and selection of appropriate hosts have been more successful. Germinating the seed has been more successful, up to 35% when it is laid aside for 12 – 18 months. Growers laying seeds into mulch, obtained from host plants, report a high rate of success. Dormancy can alternatively be broken with the use of Gibberellins, providing greater than 80% germination rates, particularly if paired with good horticultural practice. Cultivation of this plant has faced other obstacles; for example, the species is susceptible to a number of pests and fungal diseases.

The research and development of domestication of the species was first undertaken by Brian Powell, at a property in Quorn, South Australia. The successful plants in this trial are classed as "Significant Trees" by the state's National Trust. This venture came to be supported by the CSIRO, in the 1970s, eventually becoming part of the research body's Sustainable Ecosystems division.

The development of horticultural practice for the establishment of commercial orchards is being researched by a number of projects. Research and trials were undertaken in South Australia by grafting Frahn's Paringa Gem onto seedling rootstock; this is how the cultivar is propagated in orchards, and the first sale of the variety was in 1997.

Host plants are needed in the establishment of an orchard; the species selected for this purpose impart factors affecting growth, resistance to infestation, and the harvest. The study of Melia azedarach (white cedar) as a host to this species revealed that S. acuminatum acquired insecticidal compounds that increased its resistance to the quandong moth. Researchers then determined that neurotoxins found in the host plant, and other substances harmful to mammals, can pass into the harvested fruit.

=== Diseases ===
Soil-borne agents of disease, such as Phytophthora and Pythium fungal species, may be present where the plant's preference for well-drained soil is not provided. Nurseries have found the plant to be responsive to the treatments prescribed, if its presence is suspected, such as phosphorous acid soil applications. A climate of high heat and humidity has occasionally induced black spot on the leaves.

=== Harvest ===
The fruit and nut of S. acuminatum are collected from the tree, or the nut from a dropping of the emu; wild harvest remains as the primary source for the widely used fruit. This was the method adopted by the colonists after their introduction to it. The plant produces large amounts of fruit in years of good rainfall; Indigenous Australians would dry this harvest and store the flesh for up to 8 years.

The establishment of experimental plantations, by the CSIRO in the 1970s, has resulted in a steady increase in supply by orchards to the market. This harvest is able to be protected from infestation, and is an easily identifiable source, meeting the requirements of food safety guidelines for commercial ingredients.

The plants produce a yield of 10 to 25 kg of fruit, 40% of the total weight is that of the kernel; the fruit is marketed as a fresh or dried product. The kernel is edible when raw, and is also roasted and salted.

== Uses ==
=== Culinary use ===
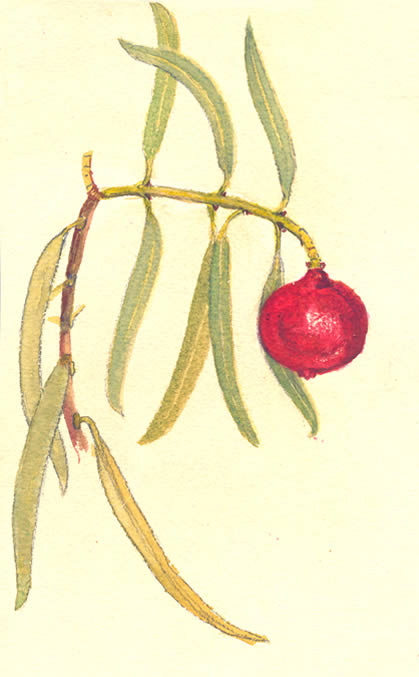
Leaves and a fruit of quandong, detail of sketch by Olive Pink (1930)

The commercial use of the fruit includes its addition to sweet and savoury foods; the flavour is tart and reminiscent of peach, apricot, or rhubarb. In South Australia S. acuminatum is called "wild peach" or "desert peach". The fruit and nut of the plant were featured in a bushfood series of stamps produced by Australia Post. It is well known as an exotic food in foreign markets, sales that greatly exceed the consumption in its own country. The fruit also has free radical-scavenging ability.

The fruit has been made commercially available, the distinctive flavour is used as an additive, particularly as a uniquely Australian product. This has usually been sourced from wild trees, sometimes by Aboriginal corporations, although the viability of commercial orchards is also being trialled. Many Aboriginal peoples are known to have used the fruit, but mainly they gathered the nuts. The undigested nut can be easily gathered from emu droppings.

The kernel has been identified, analysed, and monitored, as a "wild-harvested Australian indigenous food", by Food Standards Australia New Zealand. The product is found to be very high in fats, over half by weight.

=== Medicinal use ===
The fruit, containing vitamin C, and the kernel of the nut, containing complex oils, were used by the peoples in whose countries the species occurred. Antibacterial qualities are present in the wood of this, and all the Santalum species, especially in the roots. A known application of the extract was to heal ailments of the skin. The commercial production of cogenor S. spicatum is more advanced than this species, although research is being undertaken into the marketing of these medicinal substances.

=== Fuel ===
The seed is very high in flammable oils, like a candlenut, so it is able to be burnt as an illuminant. The wood is also oily, useful for starting a fire as a friction stick.

=== Timber ===
The hard, oily, timber is used for furniture and cabinet making by regional craftsmen, but it is not used extensively. It is a durable material, but lacks the aromatic qualities of other sandalwoods. The hard and wrinkled nuts have been used ornamentally, for necklaces and shirt buttons, and were used as marbles on Chinese checkers boards.

== History ==
The oil of sandalwoods, primarily Santalum album, was described and investigated by pharmacologists. The more widely known Australian sandalwood, S. spicatum, was extensively harvested and exported, leaving S. acuminatum as the more common Santalum in many regions.

The established use of the fruit, by Aboriginal peoples, was acknowledged by the early settlers of the colonies; this product was made into jam and chutney. The fruit is frequently mentioned in natural histories and botanical works, such as Flowers and plants of Western Australia, and traded as a commodity, however, the kernel of the seed has, historically, been the most extensively used.

Colonial ethnic groups did not attempt to domesticate indigenous plants in Australia, despite being known and occasionally used, but the great demand from export markets to Singapore, Britain, and elsewhere led to financial backing of growers and enthusiasts. The backyard of Dudley and Lyla Frahn in Paringa, South Australia, contained an orchard of quandongs. The couple recorded yield and qualities of the fruit, one of which became the source for the variety registered and marketed as Frahn's Paringa Gold.
