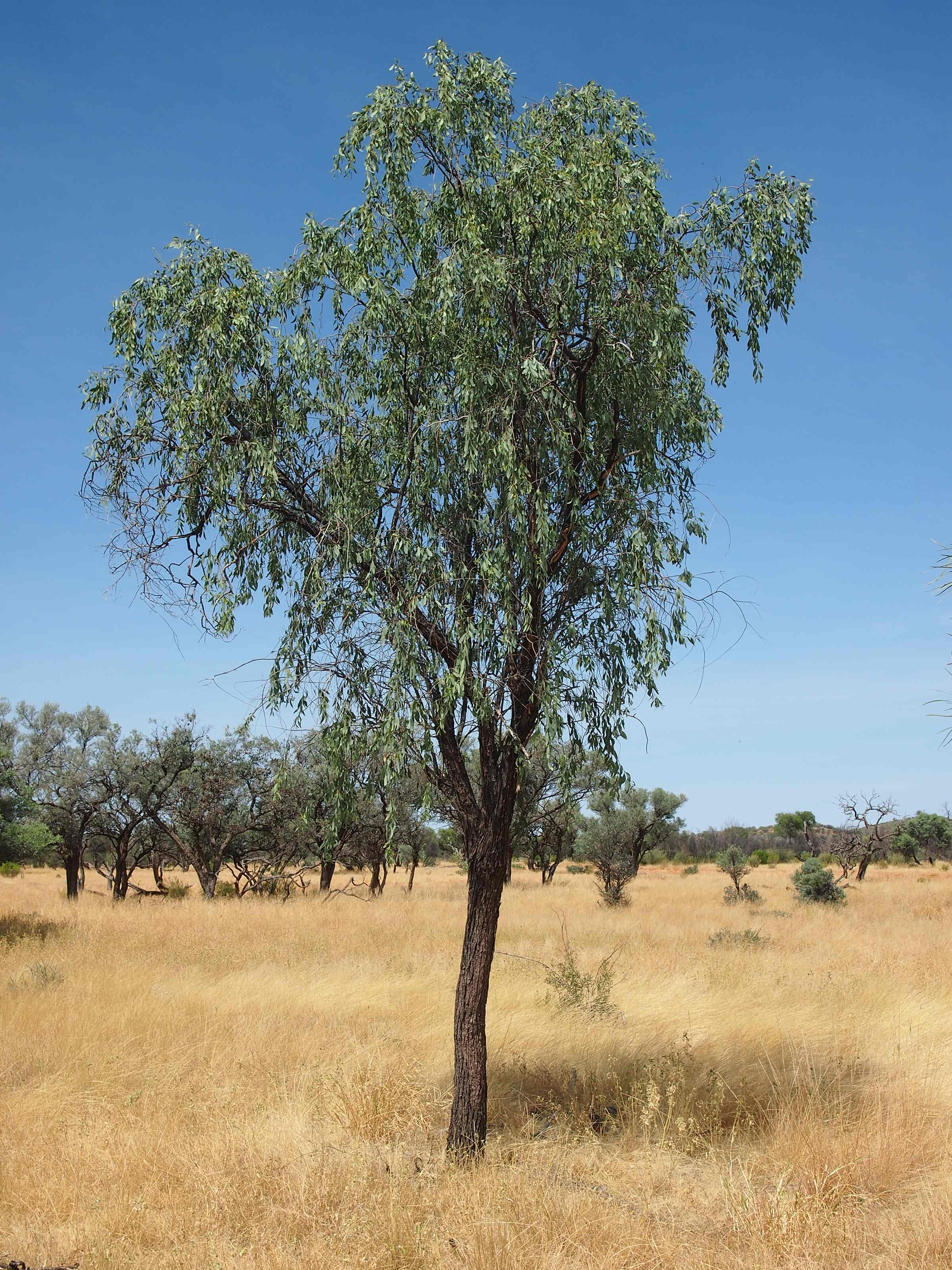

Scientific classification
- Kingdom: Plantae
- Clade: Embryophytes
- Clade: Tracheophytes
- Clade: Spermatophytes
- Clade: Angiosperms
- Clade: Eudicots
- Order: Santalales
- Family: Santalaceae
- Genus: Santalum
- Species: S. lanceolatum

Binomial name
- Santalum lanceolatum R.Br.

= Santalum lanceolatum =

Species of tree

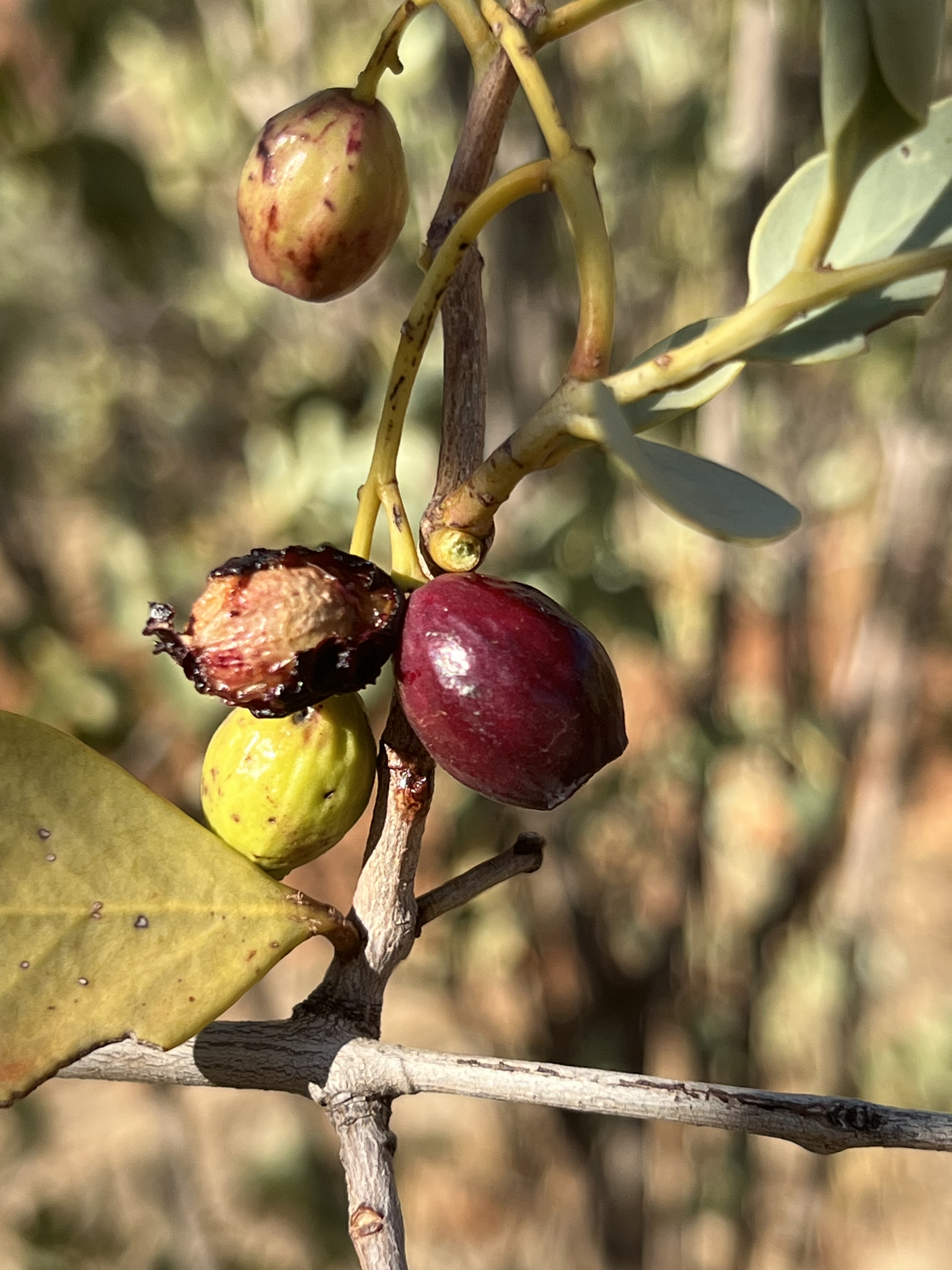
Fruit

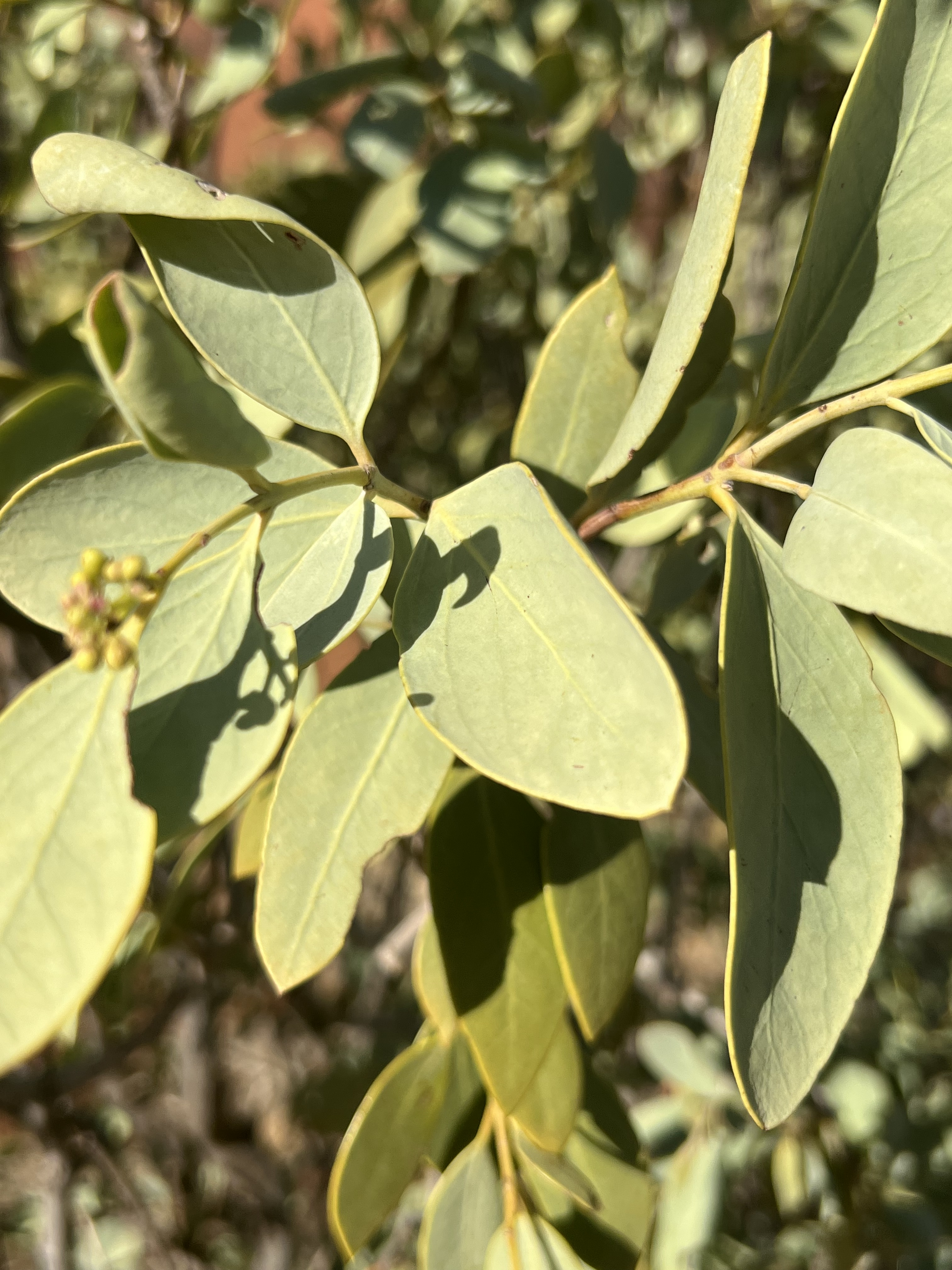
Foliage

Santalum lanceolatum is an Australian tree of the family Santalaceae. It is commonly known as desert quandong, northern sandalwood, sandalwood, or true sandalwood and in some areas as burdardu. The mature height of this plant is variable, from 1 to 7 m. The flowers are green, white, and cream, appearing between January and October. The species has a distribution throughout central Australia, becoming scattered or unusual in more southern regions.

== Taxonomy ==
Santalum lanceolatum was first formally described in 1810 by Robert Brown and the description was published in Prodromus Florae Novae Hollandiae.

== Distribution and habitat ==
The native range of the plant extends from north-western Victoria, northwards through New South Wales to North Queensland, westwards across The Northern Territory and into north-western Western Australia. It is a plant primarily of arid and semiarid inland areas, although its distribution reaches the coast in both Central Queensland and the Kimberley. The tree is becoming increasingly rare across much of its desert range due to destructive browsing by feral camels.

== Ecology ==
The family Santalaceae falls within the mistletoe clade, and S. lanceolatum is a hemiparasite, which obtains some of its water and mineral nutrient requirements from the roots of other plants.

== Medicinal uses ==
The plant is used by the people of the northwest for medicinal purposes, and is placed within the 'Burndad song cycle' of those countries. In the Marra language, it is called dumbuyumbu. This name also occurs in neighbouring languages such as Alawa and is used in Roper River Kriol.

Burning the leaves is believed to repel insects.
