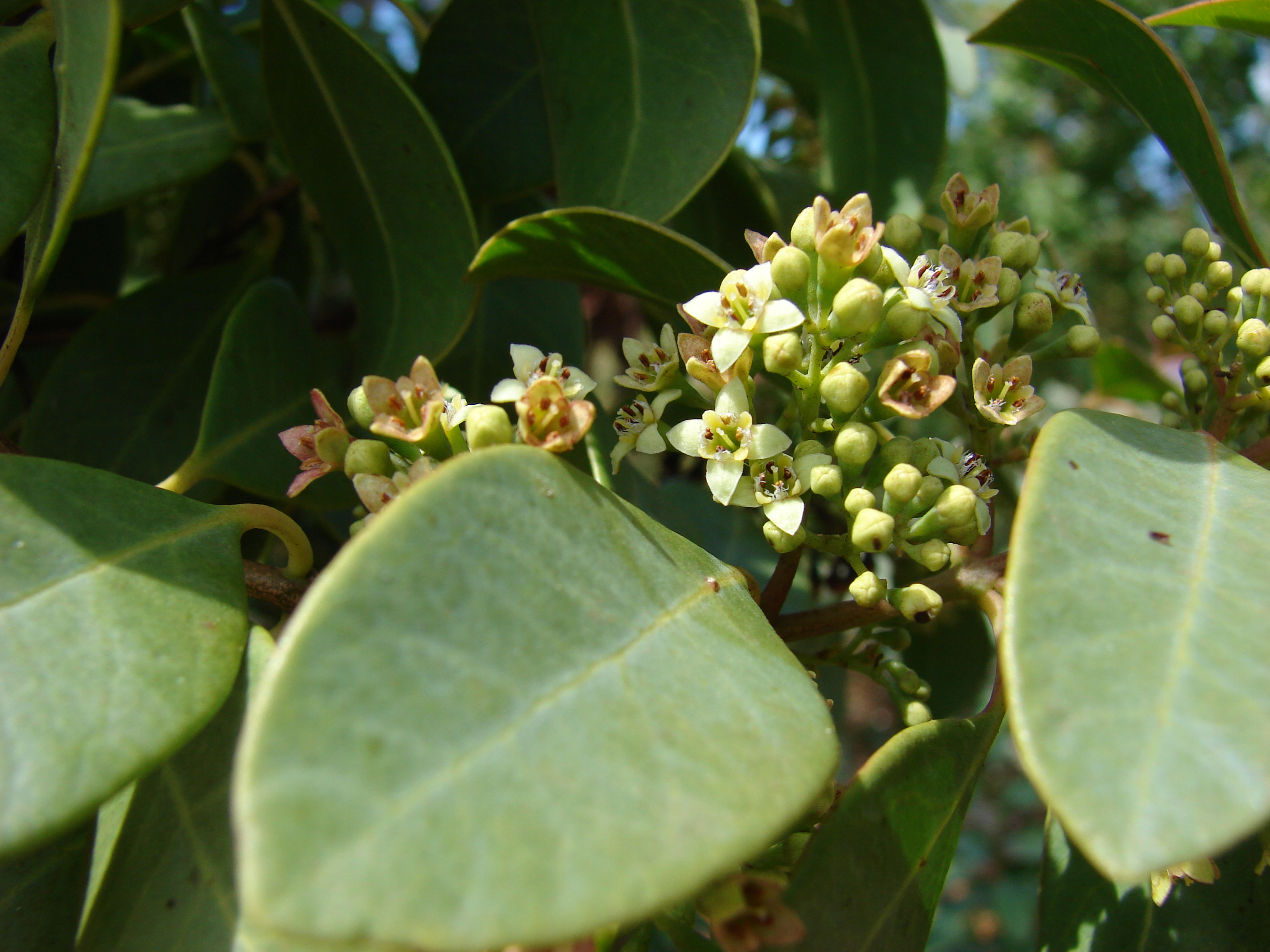

Scientific classification
- Kingdom: Plantae
- Clade: Tracheophytes
- Clade: Angiosperms
- Clade: Eudicots
- Order: Santalales
- Family: Santalaceae
- Genus: Santalum
- Species: S. ellipticum

Binomial name
- Santalum ellipticum Gaudich.

= Santalum ellipticum =

Species of tree

Santalum ellipticum, commonly known as ʻIliahialoʻe (Hawaiian) or coastal sandalwood, is a species of flowering plant in the mistletoe family, Santalaceae, that is endemic to the Hawaiian Islands. It is a sprawling shrub to small tree, typically reaching a height of 1–5 m (3.3–16.4 ft) and a canopy spread of 1–3 m (3.3–9.8 ft), but is extremely variable in size and shape. Like other members of the genus, S. ellipticum is a hemi-parasite, deriving some of its nutrients from the host plant by attaching to its roots.

== Habitat and range ==
ʻIliahialoʻe inhabits dry forests, low shrublands, and lava plains throughout the archipelago, including the Northwestern Hawaiian Islands, but has been extirpated from Laysan and Kahoʻolawe. Although never recorded on Niʻihau, its historic presence on the island is almost certain. S. ellipticum is generally found at elevations from sea level to 560 m (1,840 ft), but populations can occur as high as 950 m (3,120 ft). An isolated individual was observed growing at 2,140 m (7,020 ft) on the island of Hawaiʻi.

== Uses ==
=== Non-medicinal ===
The ʻlaʻau ʻala (heartwood) of ʻiliahialoʻe contains valuable, aromatic essential oils. Trees were harvested for export to China between 1791 and 1840, where the hard, yellowish-brown wood was made into carved objects, chests, and incense. The ʻiliahialoʻe trade peaked from 1815 to 1826. Native Hawaiians used the wood to make pola, the deck on a waʻa kaulua (double-hulled canoe). Powdered ʻlaʻau ʻala was used as a perfume and added to kapa cloth.

=== Medicinal ===
Native Hawaiians combined leaves and bark of the ʻiliahialoʻe with naio (Myoporum sandwicense) ashes to treat kepia o ke poʻo (dandruff) and liha o ka lauoho (head lice). ʻIliahialoʻe shavings mixed with ʻawa (Piper methysticum), nioi (Eugenia reinwardtiana), ʻahakea (Bobea spp.), and kauila (Alphitonia ponderosa) was used to treat sexually transmitted diseases.
