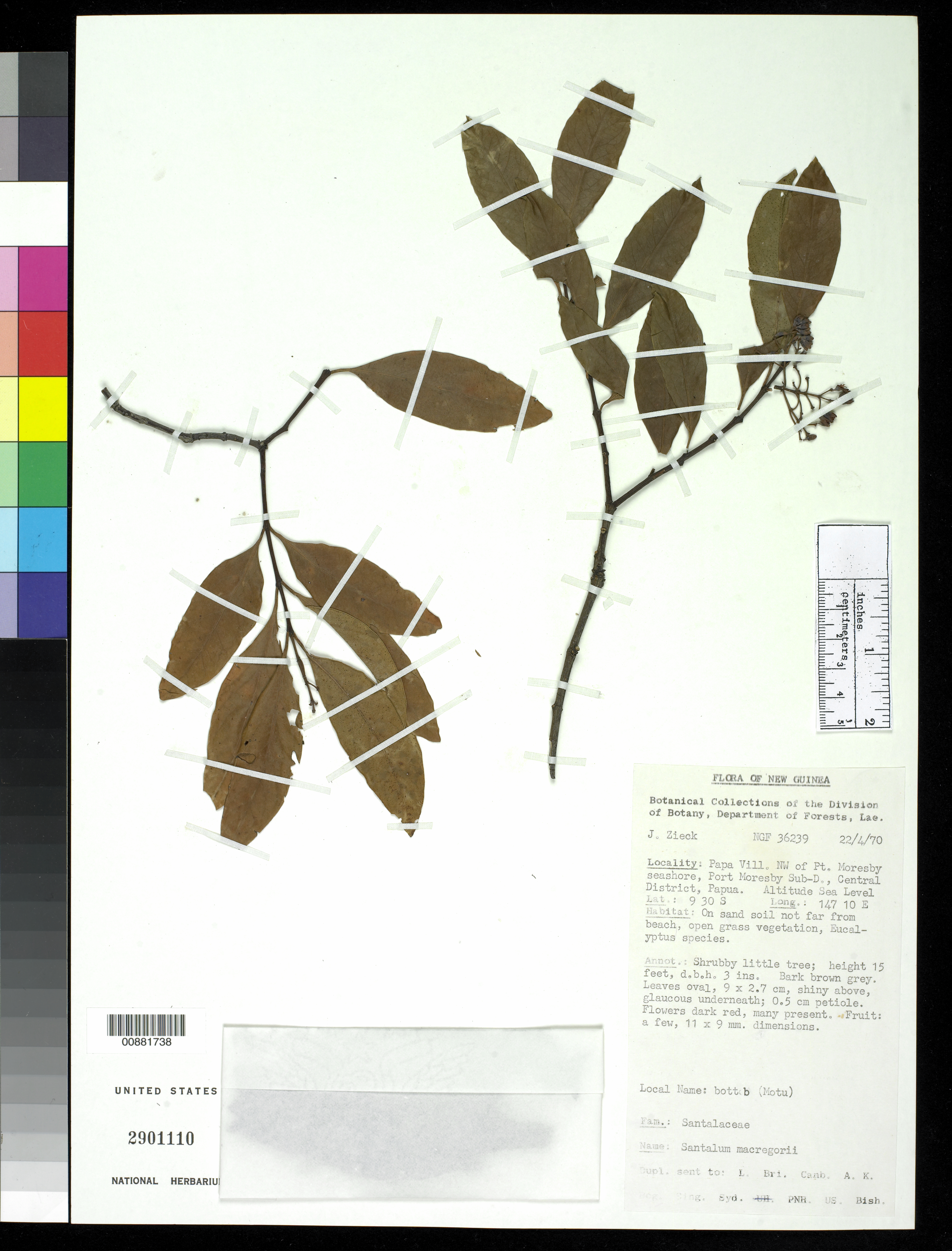

Conservation status
- Critically Endangered (IUCN 3.1)

Scientific classification
- Kingdom: Plantae
- Clade: Tracheophytes
- Clade: Angiosperms
- Clade: Eudicots
- Order: Santalales
- Family: Santalaceae
- Genus: Santalum
- Species: S. macgregorii

Binomial name
- Santalum macgregorii F.Muell.

= Santalum macgregorii =

Species of flowering plant

Santalum macgregorii is a species of plant in the Santalaceae family. It is found in possibly Indonesia and Papua New Guinea. It is threatened by habitat loss.
