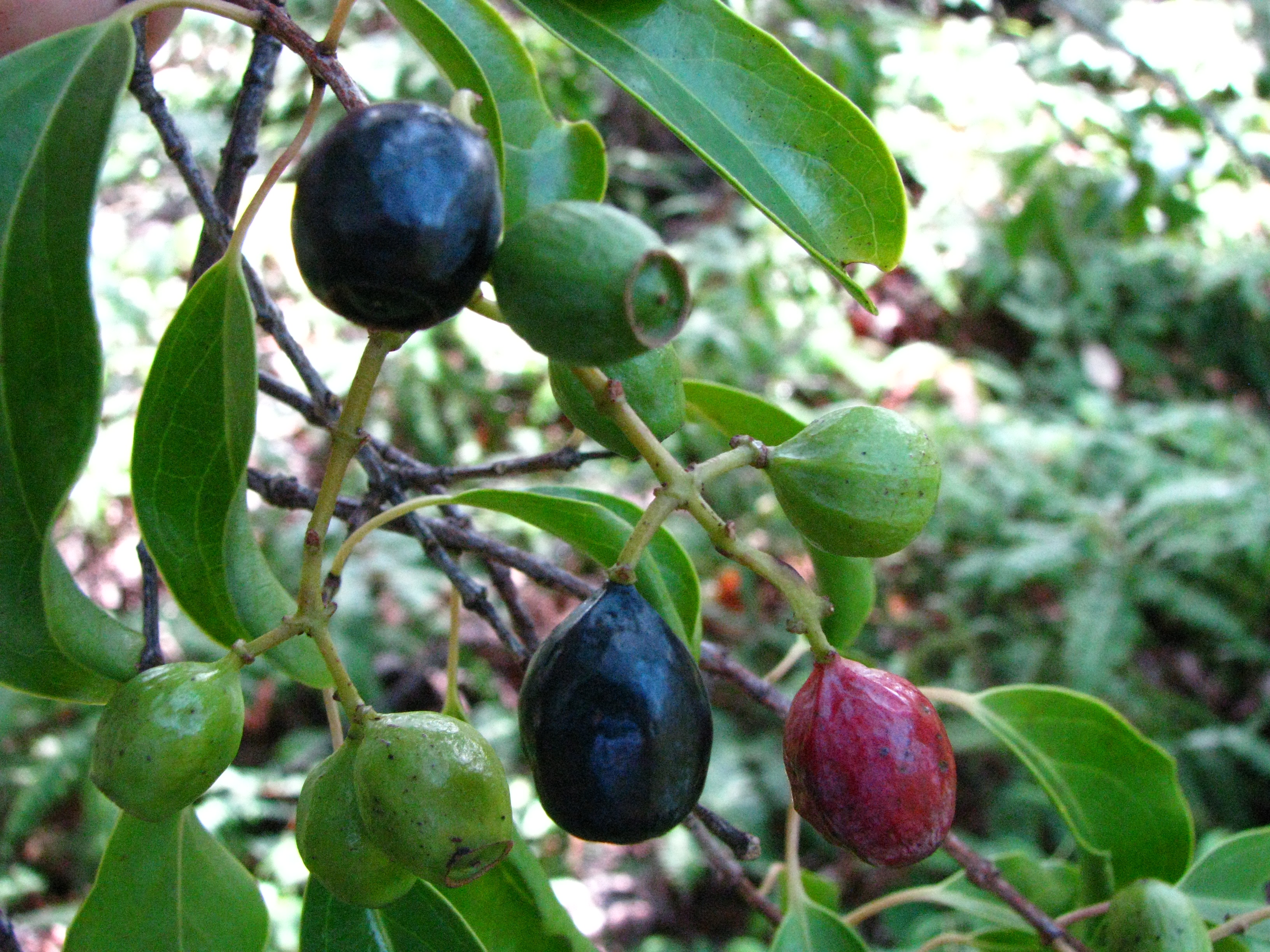
- On ʻAiea Loop Trail, Oahu

Conservation status
- Endangered (IUCN 3.1)

- Vulnerable (NatureServe)

Scientific classification
- Kingdom: Plantae
- Clade: Embryophytes
- Clade: Tracheophytes
- Clade: Spermatophytes
- Clade: Angiosperms
- Clade: Eudicots
- Order: Santalales
- Family: Santalaceae
- Genus: Santalum
- Species: S. freycinetianum

Binomial name
- Santalum freycinetianum Gaudich.

= Santalum freycinetianum =

Species of tree

Santalum freycinetianum, the forest sandalwood, ʻIliahi, Lanai sandalwood, or Freycinet sandalwood, is a species of flowering tree in the family Santalaceae, that is endemic to the Hawaiian Islands. Its binomial name commemorates Henri Louis Claude de Saulces de Freycinet, a 19th-century French explorer. ʻIliahi inhabits coastal mesic, mixed mesic, and wet forests on Oʻahu, at elevations of 400–650 m (1,310–2,130 ft). It grows in areas that receive 500–3,800 mm (20–150 in) of annual rainfall. Like other members of its genus, ʻiliahi is a root hemi-parasite, deriving some of its nutrients from the host plant; common hosts include koa (Acacia koa), koaiʻa (Acacia koaia), and ʻaʻaliʻi (Dodonaea viscosa).

== Uses ==
=== Non-medicinal ===
The ʻlaʻau ʻala (heartwood) of ʻiliahi contains valuable, aromatic essential oils. Native Hawaiians used the wood to make pola, the deck on a waʻa kaulua (double-hulled canoe). Powdered ʻlaʻau ʻala was used as a perfume and added to kapa cloth. Between 1791–1840, trees were intensively harvested for export to China, where the hard, yellowish-brown wood was made into carved objects, chests, and incense. The ʻiliahi trade peaked from 1815 to 1826, and stopped when no large trees were left.

=== Medicinal ===
Native Hawaiians combined leaves and bark of the ʻiliahi with naio (Myoporum sandwicense) ashes to treat kepia o ke poʻo (dandruff) and liha o ka lauoho (head lice). ʻIliahi shavings mixed with ʻawa (Piper methysticum), nioi (Eugenia reinwardtiana), ʻahakea (Bobea spp.), and kauila (Alphitonia ponderosa) was used to treat sexually transmitted diseases.
