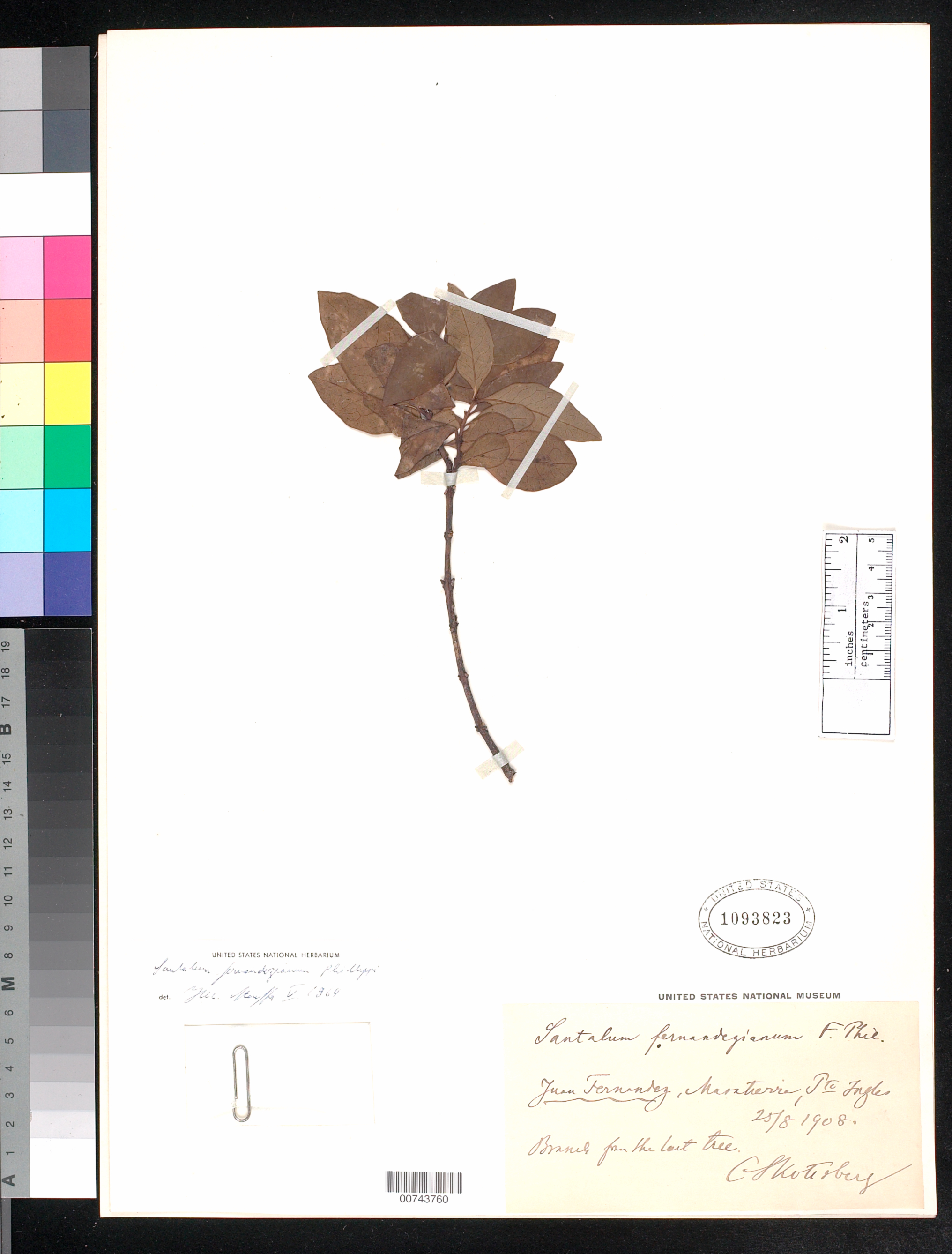

Conservation status
- Extinct (IUCN 2.3)

Scientific classification
- Kingdom: Plantae
- Clade: Tracheophytes
- Clade: Angiosperms
- Clade: Eudicots
- Order: Santalales
- Family: Santalaceae
- Genus: Santalum
- Species: †S. fernandezianum

Binomial name
- †Santalum fernandezianum F. Philippi

= Santalum fernandezianum =

Extinct species of flowering plant

Santalum fernandezianum, also known as the Chile sandalwood, was a species of plant in the Santalaceae family. It was endemic to the Juan Fernández Islands off the coast of Chile. Last seen in 1908 by Carl Skottsberg, the species was cut to extinction for its aromatic wood.
