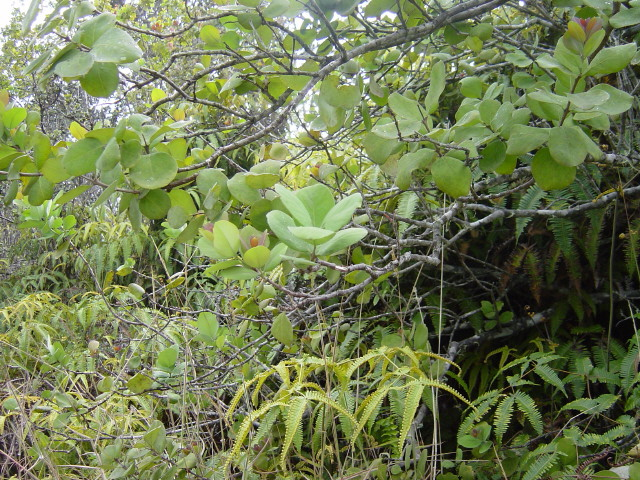
- The branches of a young Santalum paniculatum on the island of Hawaiʻi

Scientific classification
- Kingdom: Plantae
- Clade: Embryophytes
- Clade: Tracheophytes
- Clade: Angiosperms
- Clade: Eudicots
- Order: Santalales
- Family: Santalaceae
- Genus: Santalum; L.

Species
- See text

Synonyms
- Eucarya T.L.Mitch.; Fusanus R.Br.; Sirium L.

= Santalum =

Genus of flowering plants

Santalum is a genus of woody flowering plants in the Santalaceae family, the best known and most commercially valuable of which is the Indian sandalwood tree, S. album. Members of the genus are trees or shrubs. Most are root parasites which photosynthesize their own food, but tap the roots of other species for water and inorganic nutrients. Several species, most notably S. album, produce highly aromatic wood, used for scents and perfumes and for herbal medicine. It has about 25 known species which are native to Island Southeast Asia (Indonesia, Timor-Leste, and the Philippines), Melanesia (Papua New Guinea, Vanuatu, Fiji, and New Caledonia), Australia, Polynesia, the Bonin Islands of Japan, and the Juan Fernández Islands of Chile.

Indian sandalwood (S. album) is native to the tropical dry deciduous forests the Lesser Sunda Islands of Indonesia, the Philippines, and Arnhem Land of northern Australia. It is the only species of the genus found on the Asian mainland, having been introduced to India from the Lesser Sundas centuries ago. Indian sandalwood has been stripped from most of India's forests, and is now rare in the wild. Five species, including S. album, are native to Australia. S. acuminatum, known as the sweet quandong or native peach, produces a shiny bright red fruit used increasingly in Australia for jams, jellies, chutneys, and pies. Four species, (including Santalum paniculatum, commonly called ʻiliahi), are endemic to Hawaiʻi. S. fernandezianum, endemic to the Juan Fernández Islands off the coast of Chile, was also overexploited for its aromatic wood, and may now be extinct.

Santalum species are used as food plants by the larvae of some Lepidoptera species, including Endoclita malabaricus.

== Cultivation ==
The initial challenges to cultivating Santalum are numerous, not only due to its germination and growth needs, but also the amount of growing time required for the tree to properly mature. Germination of Santalum seeds is not completely understood. Seeds cannot be effectively stored, and must be planted upon harvesting them from a fruiting tree. Even in doing this, the seeds may not germinate. As such, growing saplings can be quite labour-intensive.

Furthermore, although Santalum trees photosynthesize on their own, the trees are hemiparasitic, with roots that seek out and tap the root systems of surrounding trees for water and nutrients. As such, each sapling is usually grown next to four or five host trees. Pruning of host trees is also needed at times, since Santalum trees require much sunlight for growth. Santalum plantations are also vulnerable to illegal harvesting and smuggling because the fragrant heartwood retains high market value even from relatively young trees.

To produce commercially valuable sandalwood with high levels of fragrance oils, the trees have to be at least 40 years of age, but 80 or above is preferred. As such, those who begin cultivation of Santalum likely will not live to reap the rewards of their work. However, inferior sandalwood that has been cut or toppled at 30 years old can still fetch a decent price due to the demand for real sandalwood.

Beyond these initial difficulties, growing sandalwood is not difficult, since it becomes more resistant to environmental stresses, pests, and diseases as it matures.

Sandalwood is often cited as one of the most expensive woods in the world, along with African blackwood, pink ivory, agarwood and ebony. Due to its high cost, it is often replaced in perfumery by Isobornyl cyclohexanol.

== Species ==
19 species are currently accepted:

- S. acuminatum A.DC. – desert quandong, sweet quandong, native peach (Australia)
- S. album L. – white sandalwood, Indian sandalwood (Indonesia, Philippines northern Australia)
- S. austrocaledonicum Vieill. (New Caledonia, Vanuatu)
- S. boninense (Nakai) Tuyama (Bonin Islands, Japan)
- S. ellipticum Gaudich. – ʻiliahialoʻe, coast sandalwood (Hawaiʻi)
- S. fernandezianum Phil. (Juan Fernández Islands)
- S. freycinetianum Gaudich. – ʻiliahi (Hawaiʻi)
- S. haleakalae Hillebr. – ʻiliahi (Hawaiʻi)
- S. insulare Bertero ex A.DC. (south-central Pacific)
- S. involutum H.St.John (Hawaiian Islands (Kauai))
- S. lanceolatum R.Br. – northern sandalwood (Australia)
- S. macgregorii F.Muell (Papua New Guinea, Indonesia)
- S. murrayanum (T.L.Mitch.) C.A.Gardner – bitter quandong (Australia)
- S. obtusifolium R.Br. (Australia)
- S. paniculatum Hook. & Arn. – ʻiliahi (Hawaiʻi)
- S. papuanum Summerh. (New Guinea)
- S. pyrularium A.Gray (Hawaiian Islands (Kauai))
- S. spicatum (R.Br.) A.DC. – Australian sandalwood (Australia)
- S. yasi Seem. - yasi (Fiji, Niue) Tonga- Ahi

=== Formerly placed here ===
- Mida salicifolia A.Cunn. – willowleaf sandalwood (as S. salicifolium (A.Cunn.) Meurisse)

== Etymology ==
Santalum derives its name from the Greek santalon, in turn from the Arabic sandal, in turn from Sanskrit chandana (Indian sandalwood).
