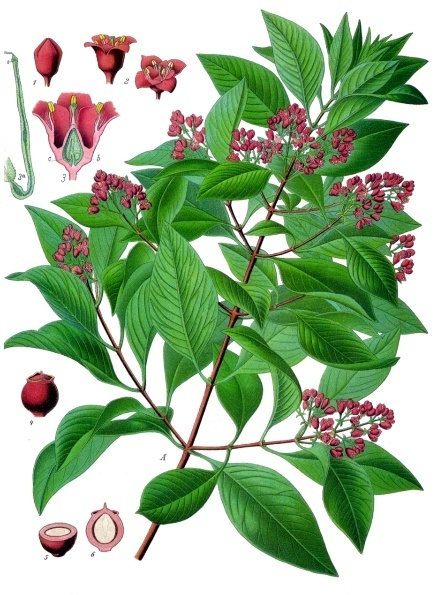

Conservation status
- Vulnerable (IUCN 3.1)

Scientific classification
- Kingdom: Plantae
- Clade: Embryophytes
- Clade: Tracheophytes
- Clade: Spermatophytes
- Clade: Angiosperms
- Clade: Eudicots
- Order: Santalales
- Family: Santalaceae
- Genus: Santalum
- Species: S. album

Binomial name
- Santalum album L.

= Santalum album =

White sandalwood

Species of tree in the sandalwood family

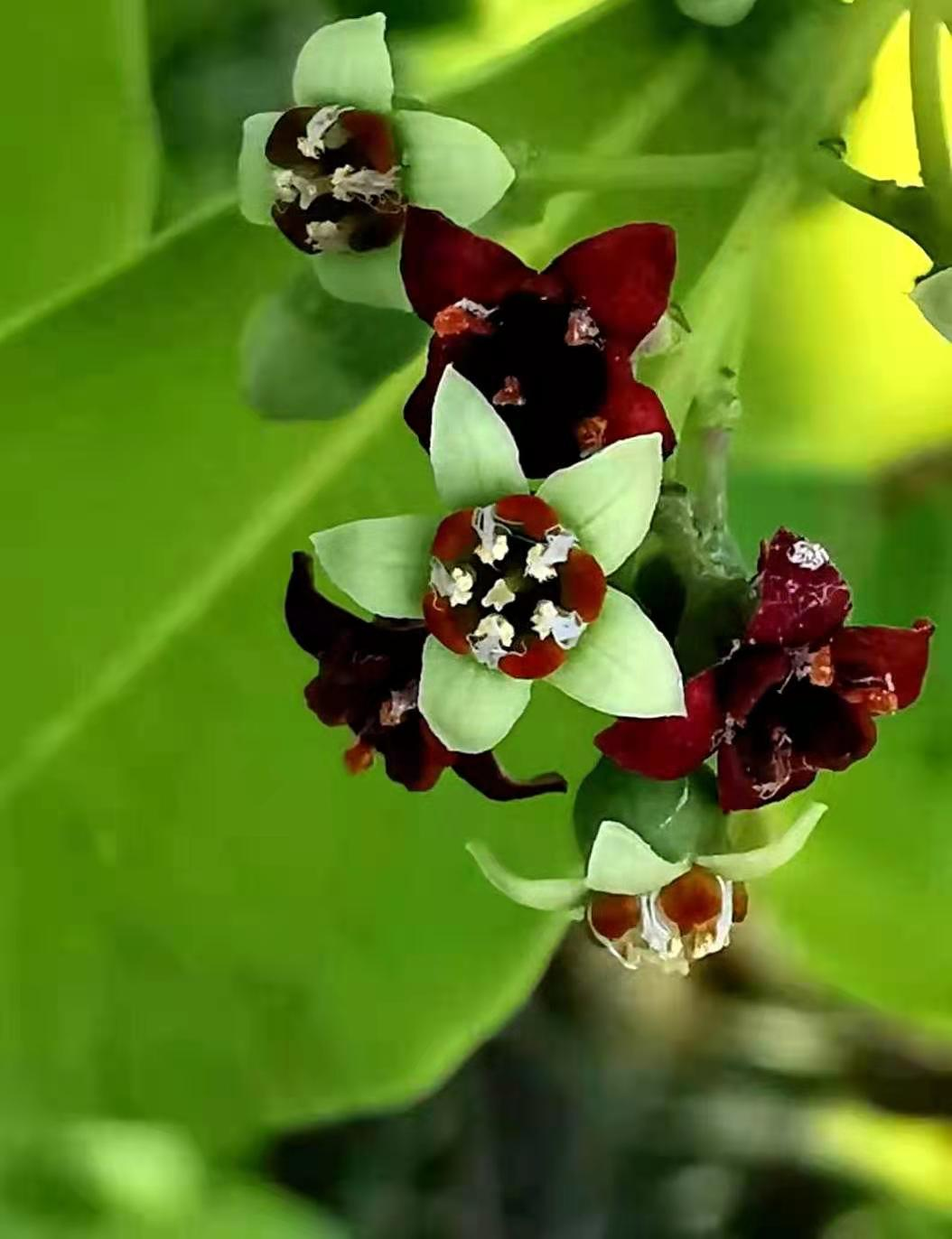
The light green calyx gradually turns dark red. Some calyces have four sepals and some have five.

Santalum album is a small tropical tree, and the traditional source of sandalwood oil. It is native to Indonesia (Java and the Lesser Sunda Islands), the Philippines, and Western Australia. It is commonly known as the white sandalwood or Indian sandalwood. It was one of the plants exploited by Austronesian arboriculture and it was introduced by Austronesian sailors to Mainland Southeast Asia, South Asia and East Asia, during the ancient spice trade, becoming naturalized in South India by at least 1300 BCE. It was greatly valued for its fragrance, and is considered sacred in some religions like Hinduism. The high value of the species has caused over-exploitation, to the point where the wild population is vulnerable to extinction. Indian sandalwood still commands high prices for its essential oil owing to its high alpha-santalol content, but the lack of sizable trees has essentially eliminated its former use for fine woodworking. The plant is long-lived, but harvest is only viable after many years.

== Description ==
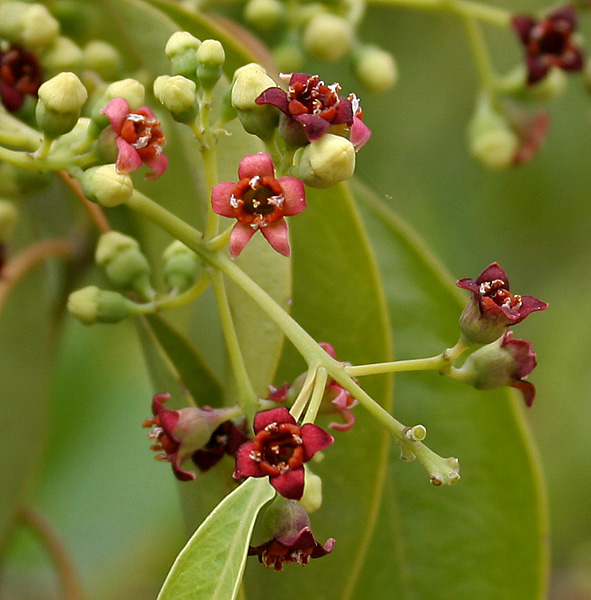
Flowers in Hyderabad, India

Santalum album is an evergreen tree that grows between 4–9 metres (13–30 feet). The tree is variable in habit, usually upright to sprawling, and may intertwine with other species. The plant parasitises the roots of other tree species, with a haustorium adaptation on its own roots, but without major detriment to its hosts. An individual will form a non-obligate relationship with a number of other plants. Up to 300 species (including its own) can host the tree's development—supplying macronutrients phosphorus, nitrogen and potassium, and shade—especially during early phases of development. It may propagate itself through wood suckering during its early development, establishing small stands. The reddish or brown bark can be almost black and is smooth in young trees, becoming cracked with a red reveal. The heartwood is pale green to white as the common name indicates. The leaves are thin, opposite and ovate to lanceolate in shape. Glabrous surface is shiny and bright green, with a glaucous pale reverse. Fruit is produced after three years, viable seeds after five. These seeds are distributed by birds.

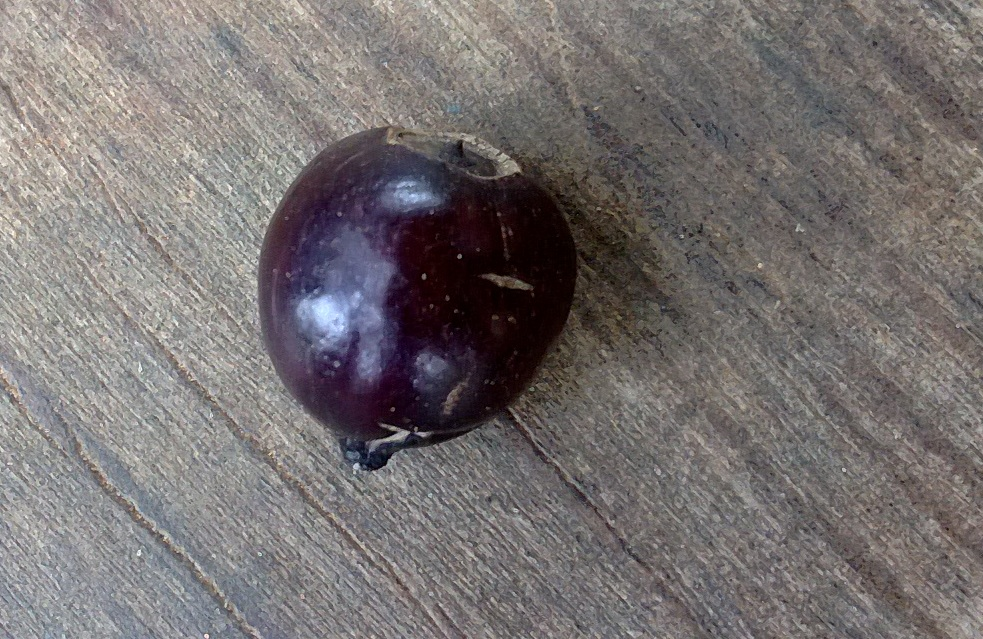
A ripened fruit of Santalum album from Panchkhal Valley, Nepal

== Taxonomy ==
=== Nomenclature ===
The nomenclature for other "sandalwoods" and the taxonomy of the genus are derived from this species' historical and widespread use. Etymologically it is derived from Sanskrit chandanam, meaning "wood for burning incense", and related to candrah, meaning "shining, glowing".

Santalum album is included in the family Santalaceae, and is commonly known as white or East Indian sandalwood. The name, Santalum ovatum, used by Robert Brown in Prodromus Florae Novae Hollandiae (1810) was described as a synonym of this species by Alex George in 1984. The epithet album refers to the "white" of the heartwood.

The species was the first to be known as sandalwood. Other species in the genus Santalum, such as the Australian S. spicatum, are also referred to as true sandalwoods, to distinguish them from trees with similar-smelling wood or oil.

=== Phytochemistry ===
Sandalwood oil consists of about 80% α-santalol and β-santolol, predominantly the former, which are sesquiterpenes. Attempts to synthesise these date to 1947 by Givaudan in Switzerland. The resulting isobornyl cyclohexanol can be distinguished from santalol, but is much cheaper. Since then other synthetic sandalwood oils have been used in laundry detergents and textiles. Three of the terpene synthase genes producing components employed in host defense are present in S. album.

== Distribution and history ==
Sandalwood is originally native to dry areas in India, Indonesia (Java and the Lesser Sunda Islands), the Philippines, and Western Australia, where it is found with close congeners. It was introduced very early (c. 1500 BCE) into Dravidian regions of South Asia via the Austronesian maritime spice trade, along with other Austronesian domesticates like areca nut and coconuts. It first appears in archaeological records in South Asia in the southern Deccan by 1300 BCE. It became naturalized in these regions where dry sandy soils are common.

Sandalwood is now cultivated in India, Sri Lanka, Indonesia, Malaysia, the Philippines and Northern Australia.

== Habitat and growth ==
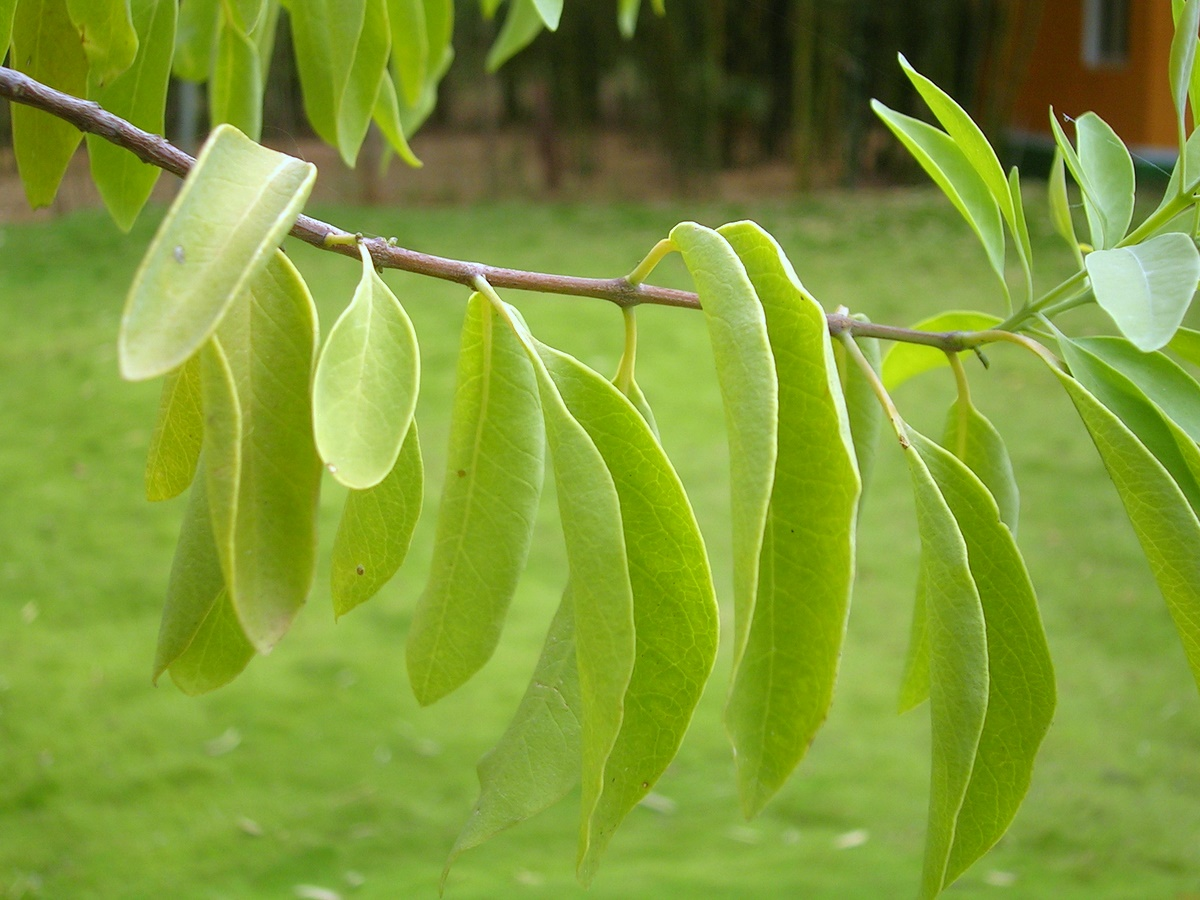

S. album occurs from coastal dry forests up to 700 metres (2,300 ft) elevation. It normally grows in sandy or well drained stony red soils, but a wide range of soil types are inhabited. This habitat has a temperature range from 0 to 38 °C (32 to 100 °F) and annual rainfall between 500 millimetres (20 in) and 3,000 millimetres (120 in). S. album can grow up to 9.1 metres (30 ft) vertically. It should be planted in good sunlight and does not require a lot of water. The tree starts to flower after seven years. When the tree is still young the flowers are white and with age they turn red or orange. The trunk of the tree starts to develop its fragrance after about 10 years of growth, but is not ready to harvest till after 20. The tree rarely lives more than 100 years.

== Conservation ==
S. album is recognized as a "vulnerable" species by the International Union for the Conservation of Nature (IUCN). It is threatened by over-exploitation and degradation to habitat through altered land use, fire (to which this species is extremely sensitive), Spike disease, agriculture, and land-clearing are the factors of most concern. To preserve this vulnerable resource from over-exploitation, legislation protects the species, and cultivation is researched and developed.

In India, regulation of sandalwood cultivation, harvesting, transport and sale varies between states. Karnataka permitted private cultivation through a 2001 amendment, while regulatory changes in 2008 and 2022 expanded the entities permitted to purchase privately grown sandalwood. Requirements relating to harvesting, transit and marketing continue to apply and differ between states. The Indian government has placed a ban on the export of the timber.

== Uses and production ==
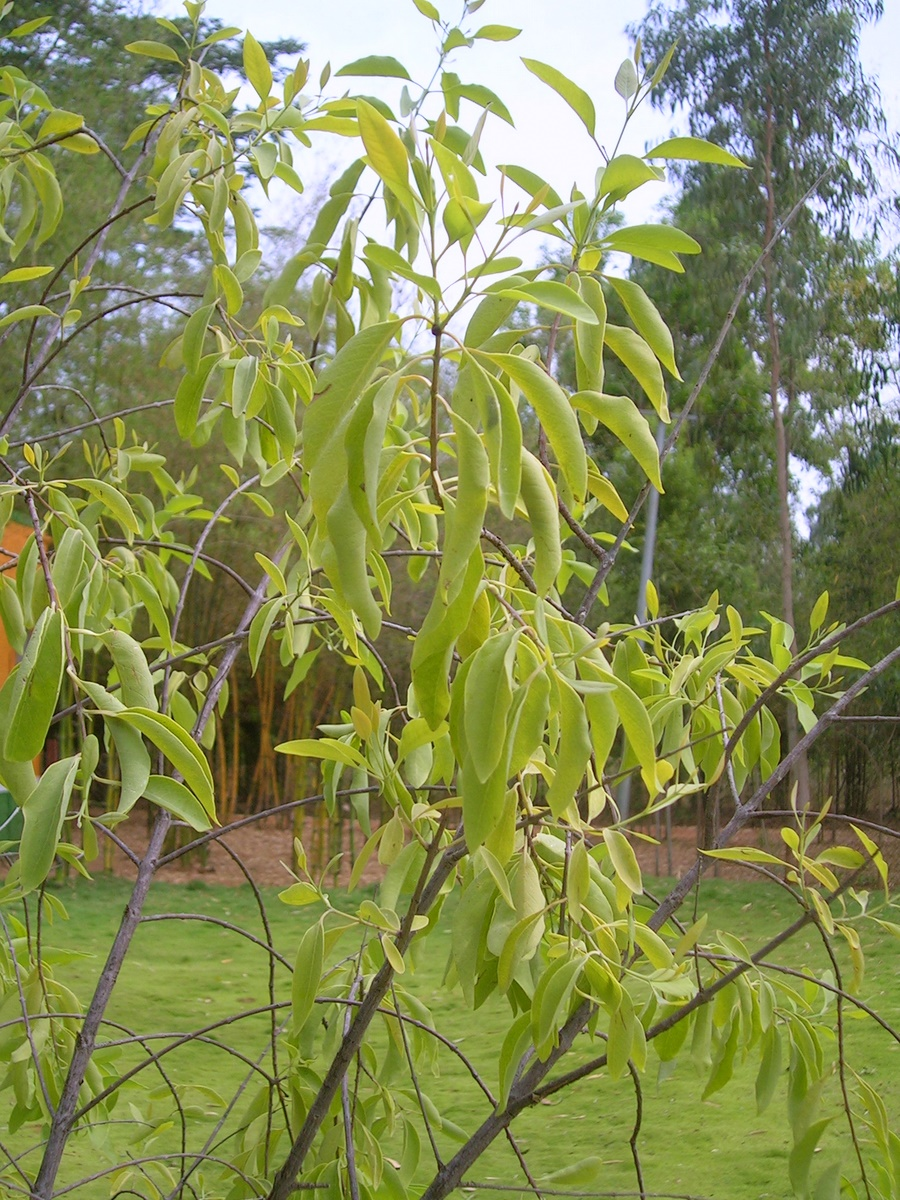
Young sapling

S. album has been the primary source of sandalwood and the derived oil. These often hold an important place in the societies of their naturalised distribution range. The central part of the tree, the heartwood, is the only part of the tree that is used for its fragrance. It is yellow-brown in colour, hard with an oily texture and due to its durability, is a preferred material for carving. The outer part of the tree, the sapwood, is unscented. The sapwood is white or yellow in colour and is used to make turnery items. The high value of sandalwood has led to attempts at cultivation, this has increased the distribution range of the plant. It was valued in construction, since it was considered rot-proof.

The first extraction of its essential oil occurred in Mysore, India, in 1917. For many years, the oils were extracted in the perfumeries at Grasse, France. Production and trade in India are governed by state-specific regulations, while privately established plantations have expanded following regulatory reforms introduced since the early 2000s.

The ISO standard for the accepted characteristics of this essential oil is ISO 3518:2002. HPTLC and GC, GC-MS based methods are used for qualitative and quantitative analyses of the volatile essential oil constituents.

White sandalwood has a high santalol content, at about 90%, compared with the other main source of the oil, the cheaper Santalum spicatum (Australian sandalwood), at around 39%, and India used to dominate production of sandalwood oil world-wide, but the industry has been in decline in the 21st century. Another source is Santalum austrocaledonicum from New Caledonia. Sandalwood is used in the production of the perfume Samsara by Guerlain (1989).

The long maturation period and difficulty in cultivation have restricted extensive planting. Harvest of the tree involves several curing and processing stages, also adding to the commercial value. The wood and oil are in high demand and are an important trade item in three main regions:

=== India ===
The use of S. album in India is noted in literature for over two thousand years. It has use as wood and oil in religious practices, and was burned in cremation. In modern times only a small fragment is added to the pyre for symbolic purposes. It also features as a construction material in temples and elsewhere. The Indian government has banned the export of the species to reduce the threat by over-harvesting. Regulation of sandalwood cultivation and trade differs between Indian states. In Karnataka, private cultivation was permitted in 2001. A 2008 amendment allowed the Karnataka Soaps and Detergents Limited and the Karnataka State Handicrafts Development Corporation to purchase sandalwood directly from private growers. In 2022, the rules were amended to permit growers to sell sandalwood to entities other than the state government or state government undertakings. Regulatory requirements concerning harvesting, transit passes and marketing continue to apply. Indian sandalwood production declined from approximately 4,000 tonnes per year in the 1960s to around 350 tonnes per year in 2014. At the same time, privately established plantations have expanded. A 2024 review estimated that sandalwood plantations covered approximately 23,100 hectares in India, including plantations in non-traditional growing states such as Madhya Pradesh, Chhattisgarh, Gujarat, Rajasthan, Uttar Pradesh, Haryana, Punjab, West Bengal and Assam. In the Union Budget 2026–27, the Government of India proposed promoting focused cultivation and strengthening the post-harvest processing of sandalwood.

=== Australia ===
The native species, Santalum spicatum, is more common and extensively grown in Western Australia. Large commercial plantations of S. album were established in northern Australia by Quintis, formerly Tropical Forestry Services, and Santanol. At the industry's peak, Indian sandalwood plantations covered more than 13,500 hectares across northern Australia. Quintis entered receivership in 2024, resulting in 96 redundancies. After attempts to sell the company as a single business were unsuccessful, its receivers began offering its plantations, processing facilities and other assets for sale individually. Santanol's owner, Mercer International, also announced plans to exit the sandalwood business and began efforts to sell Santanol in 2024. A number of former sandalwood properties have subsequently been acquired for conversion to other agricultural uses. In the Ord River region, buyers expressed interest in removing sandalwood plantations and replacing them with cotton. In December 2024, nearly 2,500 hectares of former Quintis sandalwood properties in the Northern Territory were purchased by Rombola Family Farms, primarily for an expansion of melon production. In 2025, approximately 1,835 hectares of former Quintis plantations at Millaroo and Dalbeg in Queensland were acquired for conversion to sugarcane production, with plans to remove the standing sandalwood trees. The sale and conversion of these properties represents a contraction of the land expected to remain under Indian sandalwood cultivation in Australia.

=== Indonesia ===
Indonesia forms part of the native range of S. album, with important natural and cultivated populations in East Nusa Tenggara, including the island of Timor. The species occurs in both forest populations and farmer-managed plantations. A study of sandalwood populations in North Central Timor and South Central Timor found that successfully managed farm plantations had growth characteristics comparable to those of forest populations. The study concluded that farmer participation could make an important contribution to the conservation and regeneration of sandalwood in the region. Research and forestry programmes in Indonesia have also examined the domestication, restoration, genetic conservation and sustainable use of sandalwood. Commercial Indonesian sandalwood oil is supplied to international fragrance and essential-oil markets by companies including FP Aromatics, a Singapore-based essential-oil supplier. The company states that its Indonesian sandalwood is obtained from privately grown plantations in Java and processed through partnerships with local farmers and collectors. FP Aromatics has been a member of the Union for Ethical BioTrade since 2025.

=== Comoros ===
White sandalwood is grated against a stone, coral, or ceramic surface to make a sun-protective medicinal paste called msindzano, worn on the faces of women and girls in Comoros.

=== Sri Lanka ===
The harvesting of sandalwood is preferred to be of trees that are advanced in age. Saleable wood can, however, be of trees as young as seven years. The entire plant is removed rather than cut to the base, as in coppiced species. The extensive removal of S. album over the past century led to increased vulnerability to extinction.

=== China ===
Sandalwood has been used over a long time in China for the construction of statues and temples, and was burned in censers during religious rites.

=== Egypt ===
Sandalwood was used for embalming mummies, and later was burned as part of Muslim funerals.

== See also ==
- Sandal spike phytoplasma – disease of S. album
- Domesticated plants and animals of Austronesia

== Bibliography ==
- Ellena, Jean-Claude (2022) [2020 Flammarion, Paris]. Atlas of Perfumed Botany [Atlas de botanique parfumée]. Translated by Erik Butler. Cambridge: MIT Press. ISBN 978-0-262-04673-2.
