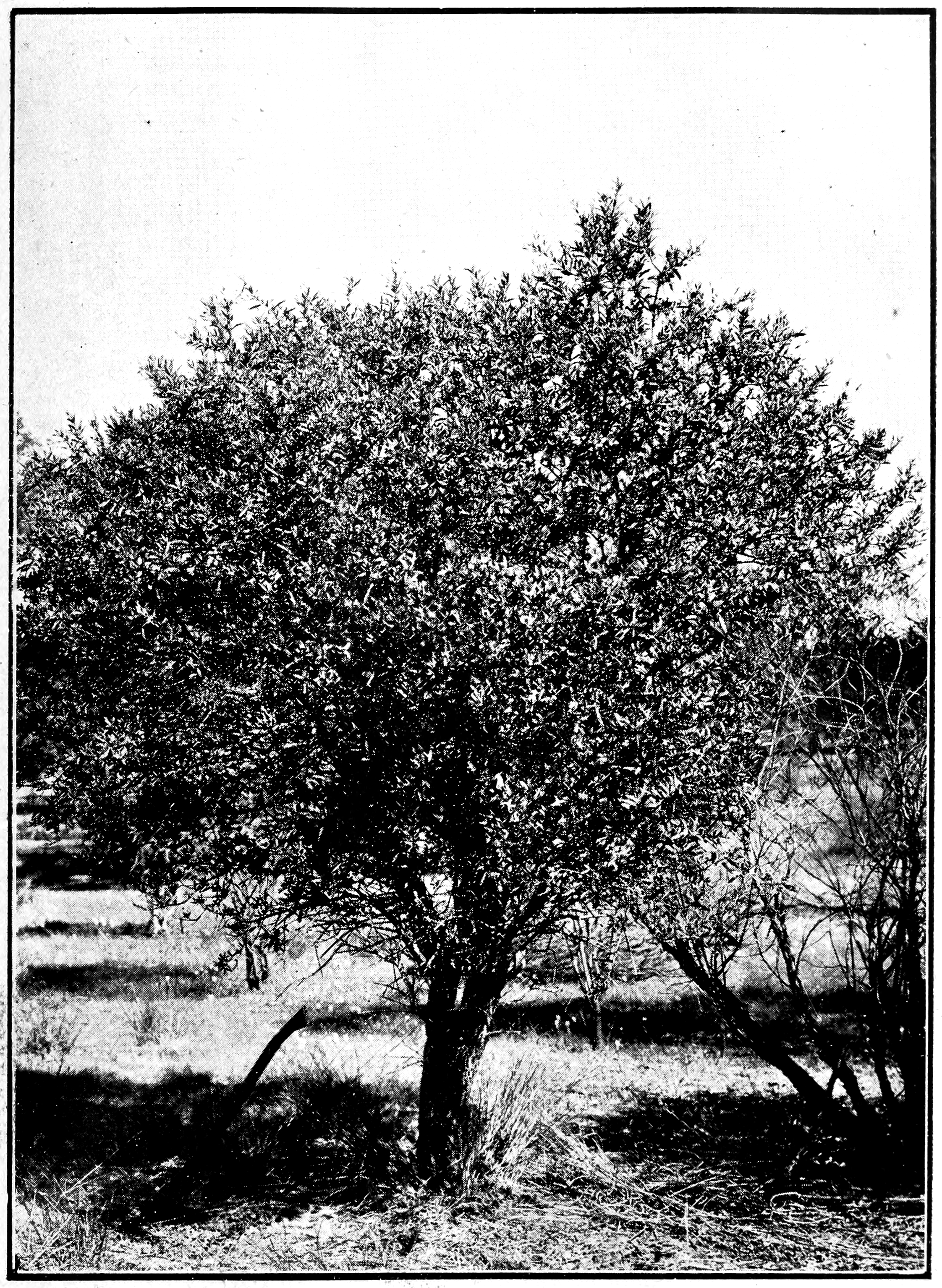
- A mature tree, circa 1920

Conservation status
- Vulnerable (IUCN 3.1)

Scientific classification
- Kingdom: Plantae
- Clade: Tracheophytes
- Clade: Angiosperms
- Clade: Eudicots
- Order: Santalales
- Family: Santalaceae
- Genus: Santalum
- Species: S. spicatum

Binomial name
- Santalum spicatum (R.Br.) A.DC.

= Santalum spicatum =

Australian sandalwood

Santalum spicatum, the Australian sandalwood, also Waang and other names (Noongar) and Dutjahn (Martu), is a tree native to semi-arid areas at the edge of Southwest Australia, in the state of Western Australia. It is also found in South Australia, where it is protected and listed as a vulnerable species. It is traded as sandalwood, and its sandalwood oil has been used as an aromatic and a food source over history. S. spicatum is one of four Santalum species occurring in Australia.

== History ==
S. spicatum has been used sustainably as a source of bush food and medicine for thousands of years by Aboriginal Australians, who also use it in smoking ceremonies. Soon after the arrival of Europeans in Western Australia, colonists began harvesting sandalwood trees to export overseas for incense production. This decimated sandalwood populations in the south west agricultural zone, and pushed harvesting out into the arid and semi-arid interior. Millions of trees have been exported since the 1840s, pushing the species towards extinction in the wild.

== Taxonomy ==
The Noongar peoples know the plant as uilarac, waang, wolgol, or wollgat, while the Martu people of the Gibson Desert call it dutjahn.

== Description ==
It is one of four species of the family Santalaceae to occur in Western Australia, and is native to semi-arid areas in the Southwest. It has a similar distribution to quandong (Santalum acuminatum) and is a hemi-parasite requiring macronutrients from the roots of hosts. It has a shrubby to small tree habit, but can grow to 6 metres (20 ft) and is tolerant of drought and salt. The foliage is grey-green in colour. The fruit of S. spicatum is spherical, about 3 centimetres (1.2 in) in diameter, and orange in colour. An edible kernel with a hard shell forms the bulk of the fruit; the shell is smoother than S. acuminatum's deeply pitted surface. Germination occurs during warm and moist conditions.

== Distribution ==
Once found across the southwest of Australia (WA & SA), at the Swan Coastal Plain and inland regions of low rainfall, the impact of over-harvesting and land-clearing for wheat and sheep since the 1880s has greatly reduced the range and population of the species.

The marsupial species Bettongia penicillata, known as the woylie, is known to consume and cache the seeds of this species, and is thought to have played a significant role in its dispersal before their decline in the twentieth century.

== Commercial use ==
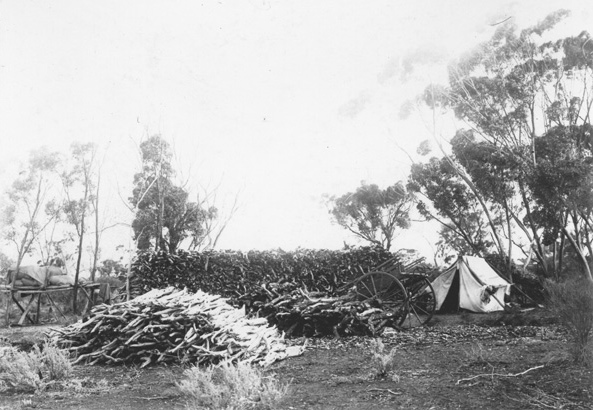
A sandalwood cutters' camp in the Wheatbelt of Western Australia

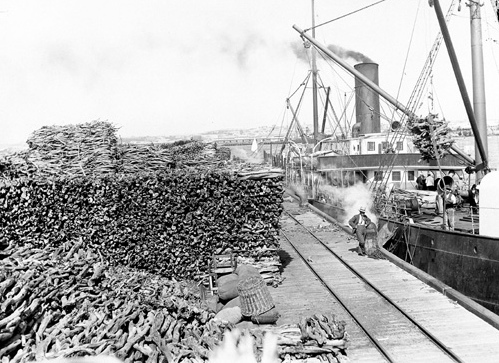
Exported from Fremantle Harbour, 1905

The harvest and export of S. spicatum has been an important part of the Western Australian economy, at one time forming more than half of the state's revenue. Settlement of the Wheatbelt area was accelerated by the funds generated by sandalwood found there. Distribution and population of the endemic stands were significantly affected during periods of rural development and economic downturn. The state conservator of forests, Charles Lane-Poole, reported in the 1920s that the export value of the 331205 tons shipped from 1845 to date was £3,061,661; the primary use when imported to China was the manufacture of incense. However, Poole also notes the development of an oil extraction industry and use as an effective medical product.

A much smaller, but economically significant, source was in the Quorn region of South Australia, reported in 1928.

Research by the Forestry Products Commission (WA), state universities and private industry was undertaken into the cultivation of the tree and the properties of its wood and nuts. Replanting has occurred at some properties as a land restoration strategy, a food crop and in the long term for harvest. Oil valued at A$1,000 per 1 kilogram (2.2 lb) is produced at Mount Romance in Albany, Western Australia.

The area of commercial plantations rose from 7-square-kilometre (2.7 sq mi) to 70-square-kilometre (27 sq mi) between 2000 and 2006. The export of 2 000 tonnes of sandalwood a year is primarily sourced from wild stands of the remote rangelands and Goldfields region of Western Australia. The harvest of naturally occurring trees is reduced when compared to the industry of the 19th century. Exports of over 50 000 tonnes in the last decade were related to agricultural expansion by increased access and harvesters.

According to the research and development corporation AgriFutures Australia in 2020, the WA sandalwood industry provides about 40 per cent of the international sandalwood oil market.

Since 2015, for the first time Aboriginal Australians have been involved in the production of the oil. The Dutjahn custodians, representing the wider Martu community, who are connected to the land in the Gibson Desert where sandalwood is harvested, co-manage the company along with Kutkabbuba Aboriginal Corporation and the founders of WA Sandalwood Plantations. The harvesters stay at the tiny outstation of Mungilli, built in the early 1980s by Muntiljarra people. The company has a distillery in Kalgoorlie and markets the oil to some of the biggest names in the industry, such as Estee Lauder. The Dutjahn Sandalwood Oils company is 50 per cent owned by Indigenous Australians.

=== Cultivation ===
Germination is difficult, and may depend on the El Niño cycle. Success has been reported by placing the kernels in moist vermiculite in sealed plastic bags at room temperature. Once germinated, seeds should be planted next to a (preferably Australian native) seedling, and watered adequately.

The main host species is Acacia acuminata, which is used in plantations, which sustains a 15- to 30-year, long-term host species in loamy sands over clay duplex soils. Rock sheoak Allocasuarina huegeliana, wodjil Acacia resinimarginea, and mulga Acacia aneura are also used.

=== Composition of oils ===
The oils produced by the tree contain a great complexity of chemicals, many of which have antimicrobial qualities, and contains ximenynic acid.

== Conservation status ==
Scientists have warned for many years about the decline and over-harvesting of Australian sandalwood in the wild in Western Australia, with present harvesting and management under the WA Forest Products Commission allowing 2,500 tonnes to be harvested annually. Recent research has shown that wild populations have decreased dramatically, with no regeneration over the past 80 to 100 years where grazed by sheep and goats, and most current plants 100 to 200 years old. This is partly because the current level of harvesting is too high (a government scientist has suggested it should be around 200 tonnes), and partly because of the impact of a number of over-lapping threats such as land clearing; fire; grazing by livestock (sheep and cattle), feral goats and camels, and native herbivores; loss of natural seed dispersers (Boodies and Woylies); and climate change, especially increasing drought and associated poor rainfall in the Goldfields and the Great Western Woodlands regions.

Despite being protected and listed as a Vulnerable threatened species on the IUCN Red List, it is still being unsustainably harvested from the wild. It is listed as a vulnerable threatened species in South Australia, and there are calls to do the same at the National level and in WA. It is currently being assessed as a Threatened Species by the Australian Government.
