= Santalol =

Santalol may refer to either of two isomers of the sesquiterpene alcohol making up sandalwood oil, from Santalum species:

- α-Santalol, the larger fraction, comprising around 55% of sandalwood oil
- β-Santalol, the lesser fraction, comprising around 20% of sandalwood oil
