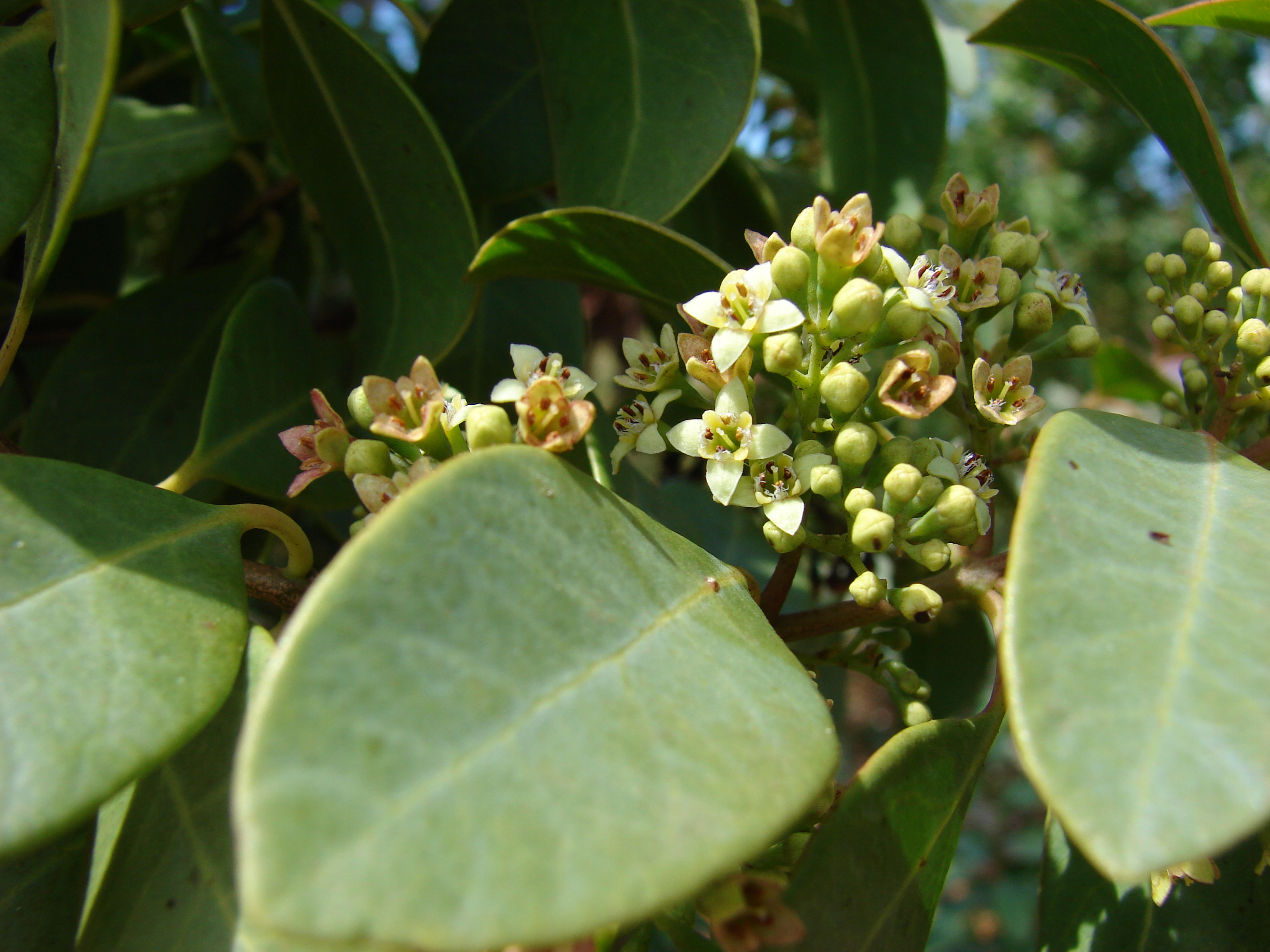

Scientific classification
- Kingdom: Plantae
- Clade: Tracheophytes
- Clade: Angiosperms
- Clade: Eudicots
- Order: Santalales
- Family: Santalaceae
- Genus: Santalum
- Species: S. yasi

Binomial name
- Santalum yasi Seem.

= Santalum yasi =

Species of plant

Santalum yasi is a species of flowering plant in the mistletoe family, Santalaceae, that is native to Fiji, Tonga and Niue. It is known as yasi or yasi dina in the Fijian language.
