= Santalum paniculatum =

Scientific classification
- Kingdom: Plantae
- Clade: Tracheophytes
- Clade: Angiosperms
- Clade: Eudicots
- Order: Santalales
- Family: Santalaceae
- Genus: Santalum
- Species: S. paniculatum

Binomial name
- Santalum paniculatum Hook. & Arn.

Species of plant

Santalum paniculatum is a parasitic rainforest tree endemic to the Hawaiian Islands. It is in the sandalwood family (Santalaceae), and is commonly called ili ahi, or Hawaiian sandalwood. The largest presently known, at Honomolino, South Kona District of the Big Island, is 20 m (66 ft) tall and has a diameter at breast height of 73 cm (29 in) (2.3 m girth) A century ago, S. paniculatum reached 25 m (82 ft) in height and a DBH of 1 m (3 ft 3 in). making it the largest known parasitic plant.
