= Isobornyl cyclohexanol =

Names
- IUPAC name 3-(5,5,6-Trimethylbicyclo[2.2.1]heptan-2-yl)cyclohexanol
- Other names Isocamphyl cyclohexanol; 3-[5,5,6-Trimethylbicyclo[2.2.1]hept-2-yl]cyclohexan-1-ol; Sandal hexanol

Identifiers
| CAS Number | 3407-42-9 |
| 3D model (JSmol) | Interactive image |
| Abbreviations | IBCH |
| ChEBI | CHEBI:171884 |
| ChEMBL | ChEMBL3182308 |
| ChemSpider | 93057 |
| ECHA InfoCard | 100.020.268 |
| EC Number | 222-294-1 |
| PubChem CID | 103005 |
| UNII | 34UP96K73Z |
| CompTox Dashboard (EPA) | DTXSID5044817 |
- InChI: InChI=1S/C16H28O/c1-10-14-8-12(16(10,2)3)9-15(14)11-5-4-6-13(17)7-11/h10-15,17H,4-9H2,1-3H3 Key: BWVZAZPLUTUBKD-UHFFFAOYSA-N
- SMILES: OC(CCC1)CC1C2CC3C(C)(C)C(C)C2C3

Properties
| Chemical formula | C_{16}H_{28}O |
| Molar mass | 236.399 g·mol^{−1} |
| Appearance | Colorless to pale yellow clear viscous liquid |
| Density | 0.97 g/mL |
| Boiling point | 302 °C (576 °F; 575 K) |

Hazards
- GHS labelling
| Pictograms | (GHS07: Exclamation mark) (GHS09: Environmental hazard) |
| Signal word | Warning |
| Hazard statements | H315, H319, H411, H412 |
| Precautionary statements | P264, P273, P280, P302+P352, P305+P351+P338, P321, P332+P313, P337+P313, P362, P391, P501 |
| Flash point | 110 °C (230 °F; 383 K) |
- Except where otherwise noted, data are given for materials in their standard state (at 25 °C [77 °F], 100 kPa). verify (what is ?) Infobox references

Isobornyl cyclohexanol (IBCH, Sandenol) is an organic compound used primarily as a fragrance because of its aroma which is similar to sandalwood oil ("sandalwood, clean, sweet, woody"). Its chemical structure is closely related to that of both α-santalol and β-santalol, which are the primary constituents of sandalwood oil.

Sandalwood trees are endangered due to overharvesting, leading to a high cost for the natural oil. IBCH is therefore produced as an economical alternative to the natural product.
