= C15H24O =

The molecular formula C_{15}H_{24}O may refer to:

- Butylated hydroxytoluene, a food additive
- Khusimol
- Nonylphenol
- 1-Nonyl-4-phenol
- α-Santalol
- β-Santalol
- Spathulenol
