= Nonoxynols =

Class of chemical compounds

- Nonoxynol-9 (Note: Image incorrectly shows a straight-chain nonyl group; should be branched.)

Names
- Other names: nonylphenol ethoxylates (NPE); ethoxylated nonylphenol; nonaethylene glycols; polyethylene glycol nonyl phenyl ethers; (nonylphenoxy)polyethyleneoxide; Nonoxynol-n; PEG-n nonyl phenyl ether; Arkopal Nn0

Identifiers
CAS Number	9016-45-9
ECHA InfoCard	100.105.533
EC Number	500-024-6
PubChem CID	Nonylphenol-ethoxylates
CompTox Dashboard (EPA)	DTXSID1027718

Properties
Chemical formula	C_{15+2n}H_{24+4n}O_{1+n}
Molar mass	Variable
- Except where otherwise noted, data are given for materials in their standard state (at 25 °C [77 °F], 100 kPa). Infobox references

Nonoxynols, also known as nonylphenol ethoxylates (NPEs), are a group of nonionic surfactants within the alkyl phenol ethoxylate superfamily. Alkyl phenol ethoxylates (APEs, APEO) have the chemical formula RC_{6}H_{4}(OC_{2}H_{4})_{n}OH (1 < n < 20). Nonoxynols are the subfamily of APEs with R = iso-C_{9}H_{19} (iso-nonyl). Like almost all APEs, nonoxynols are colorless (or nearly so) oils. Nonoxynols are used as detergents, emulsifiers, wetting agents or defoaming agents. The most commonly discussed compound nonoxynol-9 is a spermicide, formulated primarily as a component of vaginal foams and creams. Nonoxynol was found to metabolize into free nonylphenol when administered to lab animals.

== Production ==
APEs are produced by ethoxylation of alkylphenols. Nonylphenol, the precursor to nonoxynols, is derived via alkylation of phenol with tripropylene, a mixture of branched nonenes. Commercially available nonoxynols are mixtures that vary in the average number of repeating ethoxy (oxy-1,2-ethanediyl) groups, resulting in Nonoxynol-4, Nonoxynol-7, Nonoxynol-9, Nonoxynol-14, Nonoxynol-15, Nonoxynol-18, Nonoxynol-30, Nonoxynol-40, and Nonoxynol-50.

== Use ==
Nonoxynols have been used as detergents, emulsifiers and wetting agents in cosmetics, including hair products, and defoaming agents. Only nonoxynol-9 with 9 repeating ethoxy groups, has been used as a spermaticide, for vaginal foams and creams, and on condoms.

== Toxicity concerns ==
Concerns about the environmental impact of these compounds has increased since the 1990s. These surfactants have a mild to medium estrogenic function. Consequently, this class of detergents has been effectively restricted for commercial "down-the-drain" applications in Europe, and these compounds are no longer used by U.S. laundry manufacturers. On January 14, 2016, the European Commission amended existing restriction on NPEs under the Registration, Evaluation, Authorisation and Restriction of Chemicals (REACH) legislation, limiting NPE use in industrial and institutional cleaning, domestic cleaning, cosmetics and other applications including spermicides and in use as co-formulants in pesticides (except for pesticides where prior authorization was granted before July 17, 2003 in which effects of the restriction will not occur until date of their expiration) amounts equal to or exceeding 0.1% by weight, and limiting NPE residues on textile articles to 0.01% by weight, effective February 3, 2021. Previously, the use of NPE was forbidden within the EU, but there was no limit on the level of NPE residue on imported articles.

On 13 August 2008, the Swedish newspaper Göteborg Posten (sv) reported finding high levels of the NPE in Björn Borg underwear. A 2011 investigation found residual levels of NPE in samples of clothing from 14 brands sold in the U.S., including Adidas, Uniqlo, Calvin Klein, H&M, Abercrombie & Fitch, Lacoste, Converse and Ralph Lauren.
