= C9H18 =

The molecular formula C_{9}H_{18} (molar mass: 126.24 g/mol, exact mass: 126.1409 u) may refer to:

- Cyclononane
- Propylcyclohexanes:
  - 1-Propylcyclohexane
  - Isopropylcyclohexane
- Nonene
- Tripropylene, or propylene trimer
