= Aircraft deicing fluid =

Chemical to deice aircraft

In ground deicing of aircraft, aircraft de-icing fluid (ADF), aircraft de-icer and anti-icer fluid (ADAF) or aircraft anti-icing fluid (AAF) are commonly used for both commercial and general aviation. Environmental concerns include increased salinity of groundwater where de-icing fluids are discharged into soil, and toxicity to humans and other mammals.

== Fluids used ==
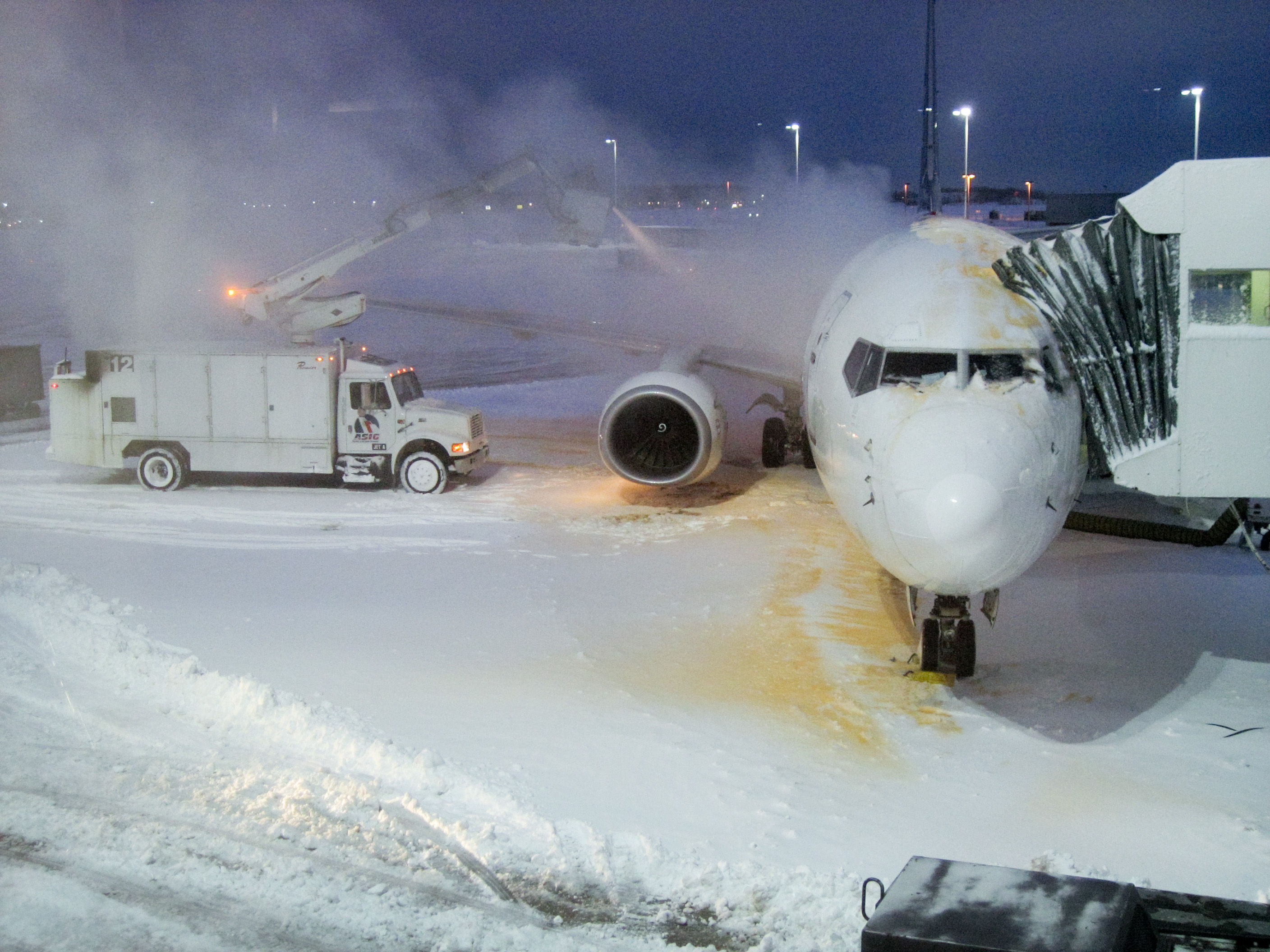
Deicing a Boeing 737 with Type I fluid

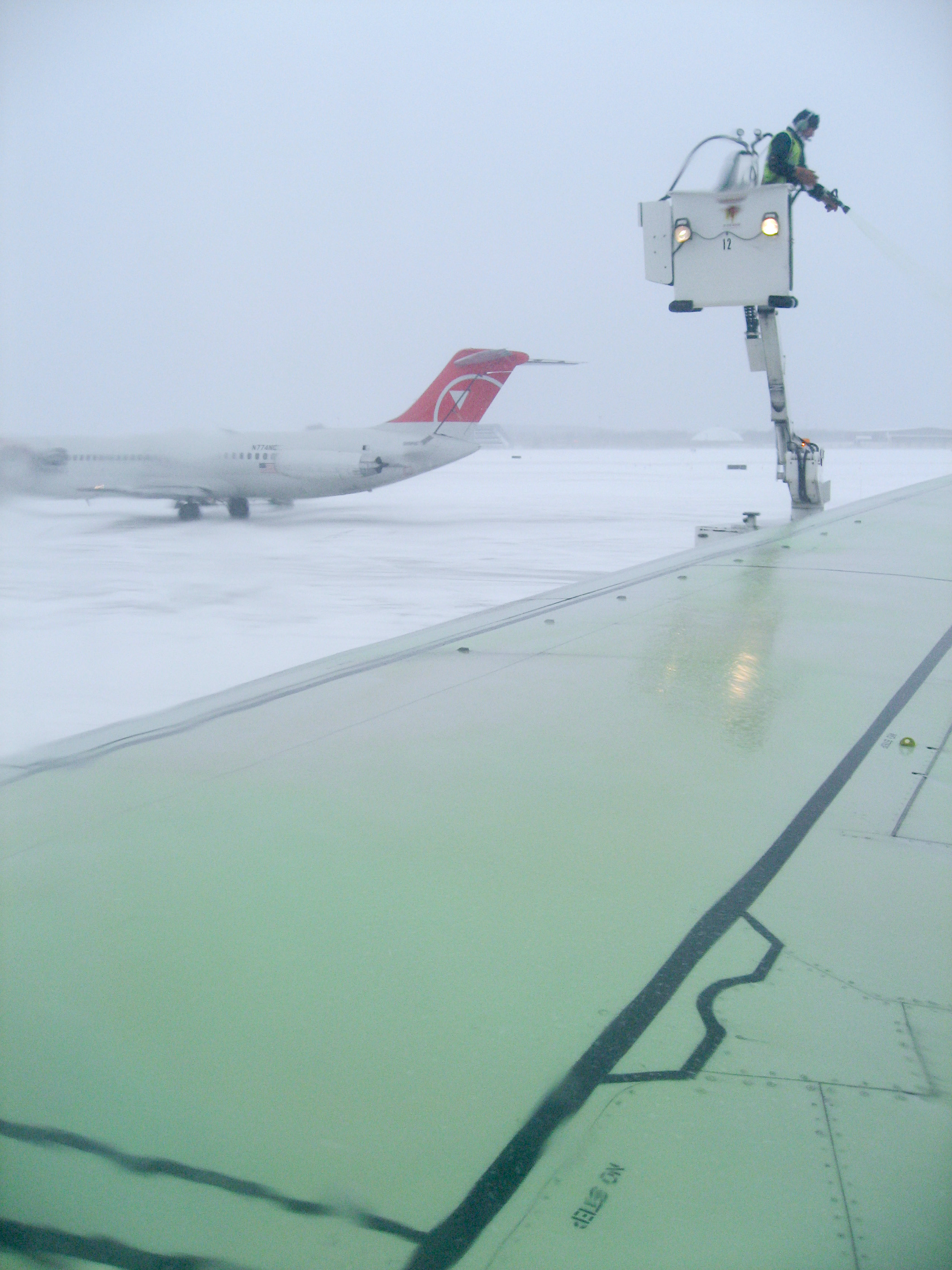
A layer of Type IV anti-icing fluid

De-icing fluids come in a variety of types, and are typically composed of ethylene glycol (EG) or propylene glycol (PG), along with other ingredients such as thickening agents, surfactants (wetting agents), corrosion inhibitors, colors, and UV-sensitive dye. Propylene glycol-based fluid is more common because it is less toxic than ethylene glycol.

SAE International (formerly known as the Society of Automotive Engineers) publishes standards (SAE AMS 1428 and AMS 1424) for four different types of aviation deicing fluids:

Type I
Type I fluids have a low viscosity, and are considered "unthickened". They provide only short term protection because they quickly flow off surfaces after use. They are typically sprayed hot (130–180 °F; 54–82 °C) at high pressure to remove snow, ice, and frost. It is typically dyed orange to aid in identification and to ensure application of a consistent layer of fluid.
Type II
Type II fluids are pseudoplastic, which means they contain a polymeric thickening agent to prevent their immediate flow off aircraft surfaces. Type II prevents snow, ice or frost contamination from adhering to the aircraft from the apron to takeoff. Typically the fluid film will remain in place until the aircraft attains 100 knots (120 mph; 190 km/h) or so, at which point the viscosity breaks down due to shear stress. The high speeds required for viscosity breakdown means that this type of fluid is useful only for larger aircraft. The use of type II fluids is diminishing in favour of type IV. Type II fluids are generally clear in color.
Type III
Type III fluids can be thought of as a compromise between type I and type II fluids; they are intended for use on slower aircraft, with a rotation speed of less than 100 knots. It is typically dyed bright yellow to aid in identification and to ensure application of a consistent layer of fluid.
Type IV
Type IV has the same purpose and meets the same AMS standards as type II fluids, but they provide a longer holdover time. It is typically dyed green to aid in identification and to ensure application of a consistent layer of fluid.

The International Organization for Standardization publishes equivalent standards (ISO 11075 and ISO 11078), defining the same four types.

De-icing fluids containing thickeners (types II, III, and IV) are also known as anti-icing fluids, because they are used primarily to prevent icing from re-occurring after an initial deicing with a type I fluid.

TKS fluid is similar to type I fluid and is used by in-flight TKS ice protection systems. It can also be used for ground-based deicing. It conforms to different standards than type I fluid: namely DTD 406B, AL-5, and NATO S-745.

== Chemical composition ==
The main component of deicing fluid is a freezing point depressant (FPD), usually propylene glycol or ethylene glycol. Other ingredients vary depending on the manufacturer, but the exact composition of a particular brand of fluid is generally held as confidential proprietary information.

Ethylene glycol (EG) fluids are still in use for aircraft deicing in some parts of the world because it has a lower operational use temperature (LOUT) than propylene glycol (PG). However, PG is more common because it is less toxic than ethylene glycol.

In non-aviation contexts, de-icing chemicals typically contain chloride salts, such as calcium chloride (CaCl_{2}). These are prohibited in aircraft deicing fluids due to their corrosive properties.

Based on chemical analysis, the US Environmental Protection Agency has identified five main classes of additives widely used among manufacturers:

1. Benzotriazole and methyl-substituted benzotriazole, are used as corrosion inhibitor.
2. Alkylphenol and alkylphenol ethoxylates, nonionic surfactants used to reduce surface tension.
3. Triethanolamine, used as a pH buffer.
4. High molecular weight, nonlinear polymers, used to increase viscoelasticity.
5. Dyes used to aid in identification.

TKS fluid (used by TKS in-flight deicing systems) contains 85% ethylene glycol, 5% isopropyl alcohol, and 10% water.

== Usage statistics ==
The amount of fluid necessary to de-ice an aircraft depends on a wide variety of factors. Deicing a large commercial aircraft typically consumes between 500 and 1,000 US gallons (1,900 and 3,800 L) of diluted fluid.

The cost of fluid varies widely due to market conditions. The amount de-icing service companies charge end users is generally in the range of US$8 to US$12 per diluted gallon (US$2.10 to US$3.20 per liter).

The total annual usage of de-icing fluids in the US is estimated to be approximately 25 million US gallons (95,000,000 L), broken down as follows (figures from 2008, adjusted to show totals for undiluted fluid):

Type	Fluid	Annual amount	Fraction
Type I	Propylene glycol	19,305,000 US gal (73,080,000 L)	77.1%
Type IV	Propylene glycol	2,856,000 US gal (10,810,000 L)	11.4%
Type I	Ethylene glycol	2,575,000 US gal (9,750,000 L)	10.3%
Type IV	Ethylene glycol	306,000 US gal (1,160,000 L)	1.2%
Note that type II and type III fluids are rarely used in the United States.

== Measurement of performance ==
De-icing fluid performance is primarily measured by Holdover Time (HOT), and Lowest Operational Use Temperature (LOUT).

Holdover time
HOT is the length of time an aircraft can wait after being treated prior to takeoff. Holdover time is influenced by the fluid dilution, ambient temperature, wind, precipitation, humidity, aircraft skin material, aircraft skin temperature, and other factors. If the Holdover Time is exceeded the aircraft must be re-treated before takeoff.

Lowest operational use temperature
LOUT is the lowest temperature at which a de/anti-icing fluid will adequately flow off aircraft critical surfaces and maintain the required anti-icing freezing point buffer for type II, III and IV fluid which is 13 and 18 °F (7 and 10 °C) for type I fluid below outside air temperature.

In the United States, the FAA publishes official holdover time and lowest operational use temperature tables for all approved de-icing fluids, and revises them annually.

For type I fluids, the Holdover Time listed in the FAA tables ranges from 1 to 22 minutes, depending on the above-mentioned situational factors. For type IV fluids the holdover time ranges from 9 to 160 minutes.

== Dilution ==
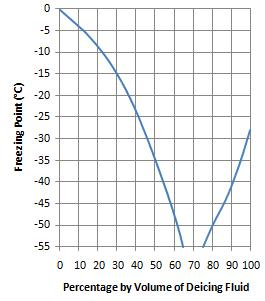

Deicing fluids work best when they are diluted with water. For example, undiluted Dow UCAR deicing fluid (type I – ethylene glycol), has a freezing point of −18 °F (−28 °C). Water freezes at 32 °F (0 °C); however, a mixture of 70% de-icing fluid and 30% water freezes below −67 °F (−55 °C). This is known as the eutectic concentration – the mixture proportion where the freezing point of the mixture is at its lowest point, and lower than either of the component substances.

Depending on the manufacturer, deicing fluids may be sold in concentrated or pre-diluted formulations. Dilution, where necessary, must be done according to ambient weather condition and the manufacturer's instructions in order to minimize costs while maintaining safety.

The dilution of a particular sample of fluid (and hence its freezing point) can be easily confirmed by measuring its refractive index with a refractometer, and looking up the result in the de-icing fluid manufacturer's tables.

== Layer thickness ==
Thickened fluids (types II, III, and IV) are intended to remain on surfaces after application in order to provide anti-icing protection. They are also designed to slough off during the takeoff run so that they do not negatively affect flight performance. In order to obtain these objectives they must be applied at the correct thickness.

For a typical type IV fluid, a layer thickness of between 0.04 and 0.12 in (1 and 3 mm) is required, however each manufacturer will document their own requirements.

== Standards compliance ==
Manufacturers of aviation deicing fluids must certify that their products conform to the AMS 1424 and 1428 standards using the defined high speed ramp test, low speed ramp test, and water spray endurance test.

The objective of these standards is to ensure acceptable aerodynamic characteristics of the deicing/anti-icing fluids as they flow off aircraft lifting and control surfaces during the takeoff ground acceleration and climb.

With the development of non-glycol deicing fluids these standards are evolving to address additional factors such as corrosion, foaming, thickening, residue formation, slipperiness, and mold formation.

== Cautions ==
The repeated application of type II, type III, or type IV anti-icing fluid may cause residues to collect in aerodynamic quiet areas, cavities and gaps. These residues may rehydrate and freeze under certain temperature changes, in high humidity, and rainy conditions. In addition, they may block or impede critical flight control systems.

An appropriate inspection and cleaning program should be established when using these types of fluids.

== Environmental impacts ==
Many de-icing fluids, including glycol-based fluids, are toxic to humans and other mammals, and damage the ecosystems where the fluids are discharged, such as the areas around airports. The use of such fluids can cause changes to nearby aquatic habitats that harm fish and other wildlife.

Ethylene glycol and propylene glycol exert high levels of biochemical oxygen demand (BOD) during degradation in surface waters. Large quantities of dissolved oxygen (DO) in the water column are consumed when microbial populations decompose propylene glycol. This process can adversely affect fish and other aquatic life by consuming oxygen needed for their survival.

Thickened fluids typically use alkylphenol ethoxylate (APE) surfactants, the biodegradation products of which have been shown to be endocrine disruptors, and as such these are banned in Europe and are under EPA scrutiny in the US. A number of fluids also use benzotriazole or tolyltriazole corrosion inhibitors, which are toxic and non-biodegradable and thus persist in the environment. Research is ongoing to find less problematic alternatives. This is proving to be challenging due to the many performance and safety factors that need to be considered.

One US FAA-approved deicing fluid (Kilfrost DF Sustain) is 1,3-propanediol, a fermentation product of corn, as a freezing point depressant instead of ethylene glycol or propylene glycol.

Benzotriazole (and tolyltriazoles), although not highly toxic, is not readily degradable and has a limited sorption tendency. Hence, it is only partly removed in wastewater treatment plants and a substantial fraction reaches surface water such as rivers and lakes.

=== Prevention ===
In some cases glycol recovery vehicles (GRV) are being used to vacuum the glycol and slush on the ground in deicing areas.

== See also ==
- Deicing
- Ground deicing of aircraft
- Ice protection system
