= Bek Air Flight 2100 =

2019 aviation accident in Kazakhstan

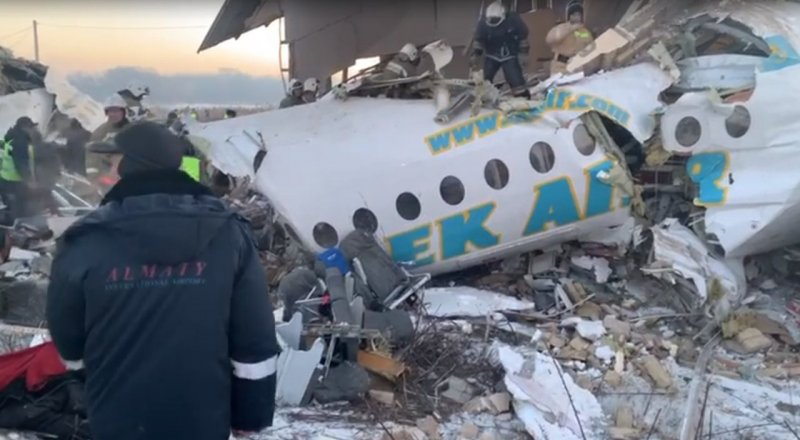
- Wreckage of the crushed fuselage in the morning

Accident
- Date: 27 December 2019
- Summary: Crashed on takeoff in icy weather and ice on the wings, pilot error
- Site: Near Almaty International Airport, Almaty, Kazakhstan; 43°22′00″N 77°04′18″E

Aircraft
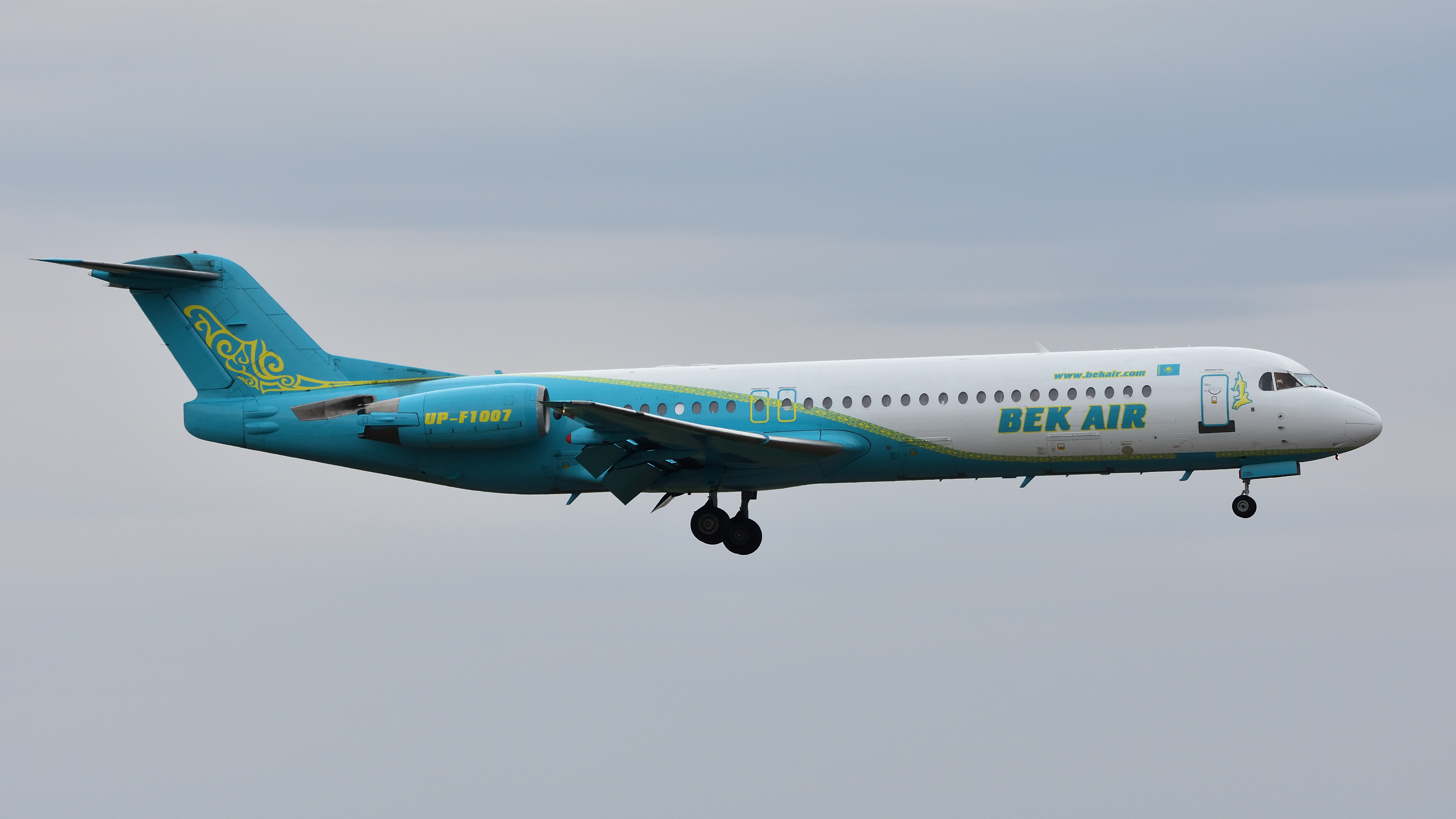
- UP-F1007, the aircraft involved in the accident, photographed in 2018 under a previous livery
- Aircraft type: Fokker 100
- Operator: Bek Air
- IATA flight No.: Z92100
- ICAO flight No.: BEK2100
- Call sign: BEKAIR 2100
- Registration: UP-F1007
- Flight origin: Almaty International Airport, Kazakhstan
- Destination: Nursultan Nazarbayev International Airport, Kazakhstan
- Occupants: 98
- Passengers: 93
- Crew: 5
- Fatalities: 13
- Injuries: 66
- Survivors: 85

Bek Air Flight 2100 was a domestic passenger flight from Almaty to Nur-Sultan, Kazakhstan, operated by a Fokker 100 that crashed on 27 December 2019 while taking off from Almaty International Airport. Of the 98 people on board (93 passengers and 5 crew), 13 died in the crash and 66 were injured. The Kazakh government started investigations on the same day.

== Aircraft and crew ==
The aircraft involved was a Fokker 100, built in 1996, which was previously flown by Formosa Airlines, Mandarin Airlines, Contact Air, and OLT Express Germany, before joining the Bek Air fleet in 2013 as UP-F1007. Bek Air had leased the aircraft to Kam Air in September 2016, then returned. The aircraft was then leased to Safi Airways in February 2017, and finally to Air Djibouti in December 2018, before being returned again to Bek Air. The aircraft remained in service with Bek Air until the day of the accident which destroyed it. The airworthiness certificate of the aircraft had been renewed on 22 May 2019.

The captain was 58-year-old Marat Ganievich Muratbaev and the first officer was 54-year-old Mirzhan Gaynulovich Muldakulov.

== Accident ==
The aircraft crashed into a building just after takeoff from Almaty International Airport in Kazakhstan. The plane took off from runway 05R and lost altitude shortly afterwards. During takeoff, its tail reportedly hit the runway twice. It reportedly turned to the right and hit a concrete perimeter fence, before impacting a two-floor building in a residential area, close to the perimeter track, around 7:22 am local time. The front of the aircraft broke away from the main fuselage, sustaining significant damage, and the tail broke off at the rear.

CCTV footage showing the crash and the plane striking the building (at 1:43)

One of the survivors stated he had seen ice on the wings. In a telephone conversation, he said, "The left wing jolted really hard, I noticed that then jolted the right [wing], and the plane began swinging as a boat." He continued, "When we took off, the plane began to shake very hard and I knew it was going to fall ... All the people who stepped on the wing fell, because there was ice. I cannot say that [before taking off] the wings were not sprayed with antifreeze, but the fact is that there was ice [visible on the wings]." The temperature at the time was −12 °C (10 °F) and visibility was 1,000 m (3,300 ft), with thick fog close to the scene.

Passengers reported opening of the over-wing exit, using which they crawled out of the aircraft, ice on the wings however caused escaping passengers to slip and fall.

== Victims ==
Thirteen people, including the captain and first officer, who died in hospital nearly a month after the accident, were killed, and 66 were injured. The passengers consisted of 85 adults, five children, and three infants; there were five crew.

Nationality	Passengers	Crew	Total
Kazakhstan	89	5	94
Kyrgyzstan	1	—N/a	1
China	1	—N/a	1
Ukraine	2	—N/a	2
Total	93	5	98

== Investigation ==
According to the Deputy Prime Minister of Kazakhstan, the preliminary results made by the commission of investigation found that the airplane struck the runway surface twice with its tail with 300–400 metres (980–1,310 ft) between the two tailstrikes.

At the end of the runway, the aircraft made a sharp turn to the right. The landing gear had already been retracted at this time. Runway surface conditions were normal.

The commission looked for human factors or technical malfunctions. The flight data recorder and cockpit voice recorder were recovered from the crash site. The captain died, while the first officer at that time was hospitalized for serious injuries, so both pilots were unable to say what happened.

Another pilot had reported 3 hours before the accident that frost had accumulated on the leading-edge slats and fuel tanks of his aircraft but the rest of the wings were free from frost. However, it was reported that other aircraft parked during the night had accumulated significant amounts of ice. At an altitude of about 1,000 feet (300 m), there was a temperature inversion with a rise in temperature of 11 °C (20 °F).

=== Final report and probable cause ===
The final report stated that the probable cause of the crash was asymmetrical loss of lift during takeoff which caused the wings to stall soon after leaving the runway. The loss of lift was caused by ice accumulation that occurred while the aircraft was on the ground.

The airplane descended immediately after takeoff and rolled to the right on the snow-covered ground, destroying the airport perimeter fence and colliding with a two-floor private building about 10 metres (33 ft) from the fence. Impact forces killed 11 passengers and one member of the flight crew, and injured 47 passengers.

=== Contributory factors ===
Other factors contributing to the crash were:

- The flight crew did not analyze weather conditions at the airport, neglected to thoroughly inspect the entire airplane, and particularly failed to perform a tactile inspection of the leading edges of the wings.
- The airline's safety management system (SMS) only contained general provisions, not specific requirements, making it difficult to identify and address flight safety risks in a timely manner.
- The presence of the two-story building exacerbated the consequences of the crash.

== Aftermath ==
The President of Kazakhstan, Kassym-Jomart Tokayev, declared the following day, 28 December 2019, a national day of mourning and said, "all those responsible will be severely punished in accordance with the law". Kazakh authorities suspended Bek Air's flight authorization after the accident.

In late January 2020, the Aviation Administration of Kazakhstan (AAK) revealed serious safety violations at the airline. The AAK found that Bek Air pilots routinely neglected to perform a walk-around and inspect for airframe ice before take-off, and had skipped these procedures on the accident flight, in violation of operations manuals from both the aircraft manufacturer and the airline. Additionally, despite flying in a region with severe winters, the airline conducted no special training for winter operations.

The AAK also found multiple systematic problems with Bek Air's maintenance program. The airline's mechanics routinely swapped parts between aircraft without keeping detailed records, and data plates had been removed from aircraft engines and other parts, making service histories virtually impossible to verify. Engine manufacturer Rolls-Royce, when asked by the AAK to provide relevant information from the accident plane, revealed that they had never received any maintenance information from Bek Air. The condition of the airline's fleet was assessed as poor.

On 17 April 2020, citing the airline's failure to correct the safety violations discovered during the investigation, the AAK recalled the company's air operator's certificate and the airworthiness certificates of its remaining Fokker 100 aircraft.

In May 2021, the Talgar District Court of Almaty sentenced a real estate agent and five building officials — including the former head of the Department of Land Relations of Talgar — to prison for the illegal and fraudulent sale of building sites close to the airport. Bek Air had said that the crash would have been less severe if building restrictions around the airport had been enforced.

== See also ==
- Palair Macedonian Airlines Flight 301
