= 1-Nonene =

- 1-Nonene

Names
- Preferred IUPAC name Non-1-ene
- Other names alpha-Nonene

Identifiers
CAS Number	124-11-8
3D model (JSmol)	Interactive image
ChEBI	CHEBI:77443
ChemSpider	29025
ECHA InfoCard	100.004.257
EC Number	271-212-0
PubChem CID	31285
UNII	YPK83LUD6G
UN number	1993
CompTox Dashboard (EPA)	DTXSID2059562
- InChI: InChI=1S/C9H18/c1-3-5-7-9-8-6-4-2/h3H,1,4-9H2,2H3 Key: JRZJOMJEPLMPRA-UHFFFAOYSA-N
- SMILES: C=C\CCCCCCC

Properties
Chemical formula	C_{9}H_{18}
Molar mass	126.243 g·mol^{−1}
Appearance	Colorless liquid
Odor	Onion-like, grassy
Density	0.7433 g/cm^{3}
Melting point	−81.3 °C (−114.3 °F; 191.8 K)
Boiling point	146.9 °C (296.4 °F; 420.0 K)
Solubility in water	Insoluble
Solubility in other solvents	Soluble in alcohol

Hazards
- GHS labelling
Pictograms	(GHS02: Flammable) (GHS07: Exclamation mark) (GHS08: Health hazard)
Signal word	Danger
Hazard statements	H226, H304, H315, H319, H335
Precautionary statements	P210, P233, P240, P241, P242, P243, P261, P264, P271, P280, P301+P310, P302+P352, P303+P361+P353, P304+P340, P305+P351+P338, P312, P321, P331, P332+P313, P337+P313, P362, P370+P378, P403+P233, P403+P235, P405, P501
NFPA 704 (fire diamond)	0 3 0
Flash point	26 °C (79 °F; 299 K)
- Except where otherwise noted, data are given for materials in their standard state (at 25 °C [77 °F], 100 kPa). verify (what is ?) Infobox references

1-Nonene is particular structural isomer of nonene where the double bond is located at the primary, or alpha, position making it a linear alpha olefin. It is used in the production of surfactants and lubricants, usually by way of nonylphenol. Its more branched analogue, tripropylene, is also used in this way.
