= Sandalwood oil =

Essential oil

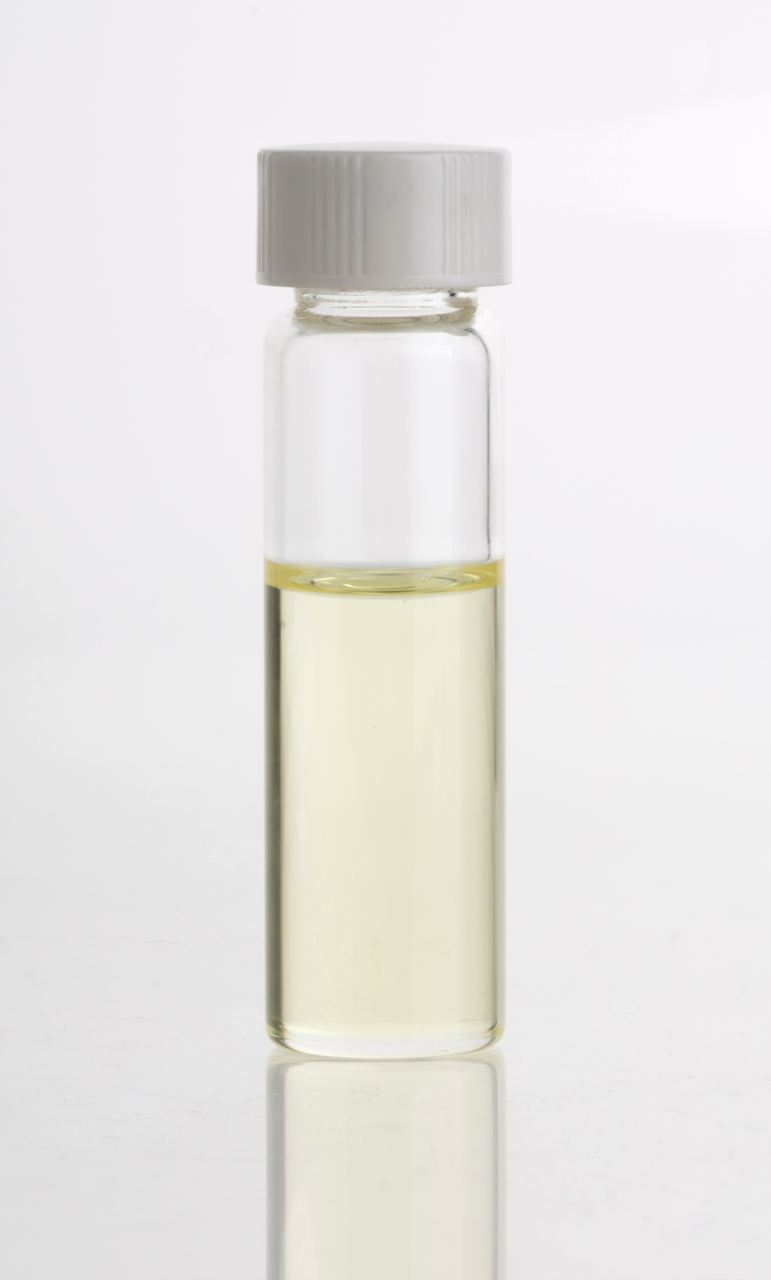
A glass vial containing pure Sandalwood Essential Oil

Sandalwood oil is an essential oil obtained from the steam distillation of chips and billets cut from the heartwood of various species of sandalwood trees, mainly Santalum album (Indian sandalwood) and Santalum spicatum (Australian sandalwood).

Sandalwood oil is used in perfumes, cosmetics, sacred unguents, and as a mild food flavouring.

== Main constituents ==
Sandalwood oil contains more than 90% sesquiterpenic alcohols of which 50–60% is the tricyclic α-santalol. β-Santalol comprises 20–25%.

The composition of the oil will depend on the species, region grown, age of tree, and possibly the season of harvest and details of the extraction process used.

Current International Organization for Standardization (ISO) standards for S. album oil are 41–55% α-santalol and 16–24% β–santalol (ISO 3518: 2002E).

== Traditional uses ==
Due to its highly coveted fragrance, the essential oil produced from sandalwood is often used in aromatherapy, and is also added to soaps, cosmetics and perfumes (usually combined with floral, resinous and spicy notes). It is used in Ayurvedic medicine for the treatment of both somatic and mental disorders, including common colds, bronchitis, fever, urinary tract infections, and inflammation. A study investigating the effects of inhalation of East Indian sandalwood oil and its main compound, α-santalol, on human physiological parameters found that the compounds elevated pulse rate, skin conductance, and systolic blood pressure.

There is also religious significance associated with sandalwood oil and it is used in many different religions around the world, including Hinduism, Jainism, Buddhism, and Zoroastrianism.

== Production ==
The oil is distilled from the wood of the entire tree including stump and roots. Australian sandalwood (S. spicatum) is unique in that the white sapwood does not require removal before distilling the oil, while Indian Sandalwood (S. album) does require removal of the sapwood prior to distillation.

== Fragrance ==
Sandalwood oil is used extensively for its woody-floral scent. Sandalwood oil can also, under certain conditions, have a creamy or even pickled aroma. It pairs well with other wood or floral scents such as violet, rose, tuberose, clove, and oakmoss. But since the wood is so rare and expensive, cosmetic companies use synthetic substitutes of similar structure and scent.

There are several synthetic odorants with odor similar to sandalwood oil, used as lower-cost alternatives for perfumes, emollients, and skin cleaning agents. Common synthetic substitutes include Bacdanlol, Brahmanol, Ebanol, Firsantol, Sandalore, and Sandaxol.

Two of these, Sandalore and Brahmanol, have been found to be agonists of the cutaneous olfactory receptor OR2AT4, with potential therapeutic benefits for wound healing. Natural sandalwood oil, and other synthetic sandalwood odorants, did not have the same effect.

== Safety ==
There hasn't been extensive research conducted on the safety of sandalwood oil. But because there haven't been any significant adverse effects documented in scientific literature, it continues to be used cosmetically and in food. A few studies were found to identify sandalwood oil's potential toxic effects, but it was determined to be safe at the present levels that the oil is used in food as flavorings.

== See also ==
- Isobornyl cyclohexanol, a synthetic sandalwood oil
- Sandalore, a synthetic sandalwood odorant
- Mysore Sandalwood Oil
