= Bek Air =

Kazakh airline

Bek Air Бек Эйр / Bek Eir
IATA	ICAO	Call sign
Z9	BEK	BEKAIR
- Founded: 1999 (as Berkut Air)
- Commenced operations: 1 September 2011
- Ceased operations: 17 April 2020
- Hubs: Oral Ak Zhol Airport
- Focus cities: Almaty
- Fleet size: 8
- Destinations: 19
- Headquarters: Oral, West Kazakhstan Province, Kazakhstan
- Website: bekair.aero

Bek Air was a Kazakh airline headquartered in Oral.

== History ==
The airline was founded in 1999 as a business jet operator, Berkut Air, and since started domestic scheduled services. In 2008, Berkut Air purchased shares of stock in Oral Ak Zhol Airport, which was a base airport for the company. Bek Air has committed to investing KZT10 million (US$30,000) a month to reconstruct the airport's runway, which was in poor condition. In 2011, the airline was rebranded as Bek Air.

On 27 December 2019, following the crash of Bek Air Flight 2100, the airline's operations were suspended until further notice by the government of Kazakhstan. In late January 2020, the Aviation Administration of Kazakhstan (AAK) revealed serious safety violations at the airline. The AAK found that Bek Air pilots routinely neglected to perform a walk-around and inspect for airframe ice before take-off, and had skipped these procedures on the accident flight, in violation of operations manuals from both the aircraft manufacturer and the airline. Despite flying in a region with severe winters, the airline conducted no special training for winter operations. Bek Air mechanics often swapped parts between aircraft without keeping detailed records, and data plates had been removed from aircraft engines and other parts, hindering verification of service histories. Rolls-Royce, the manufacturer of the engines in the airline's Fokker 100 aircraft, had received no engine maintenance information from the airline. The AAK also found shortcomings in cargo hold fire-protection systems, life jackets, and emergency location beacons, and assessed the Bek Air fleet's condition as poor.

On 17 April 2020, the AAK—citing the airline's failure to correct safety violations—recalled Bek Air's air operator's certificate and the airworthiness certificates of its remaining Fokker 100 aircraft, stating that the company must undergo full certification anew before conducting airline operations.

== Destinations ==
Bek Air's destinations included:

Kazakhstan

- Aktau – Aktau Airport
- Aktobe – Aktobe Airport
- Almaty – Almaty International Airport
- Atyrau – Atyrau Airport
- Kyzylorda – Kyzylorda Airport
- Astana – Nursultan Nazarbayev International Airport
- Oral – Oral Ak Zhol Airport
- Oskemen – Oskemen Airport
- Pavlodar – Pavlodar Airport
- Şymkent – Şymkent International Airport

== Fleet ==
=== Recent fleet ===
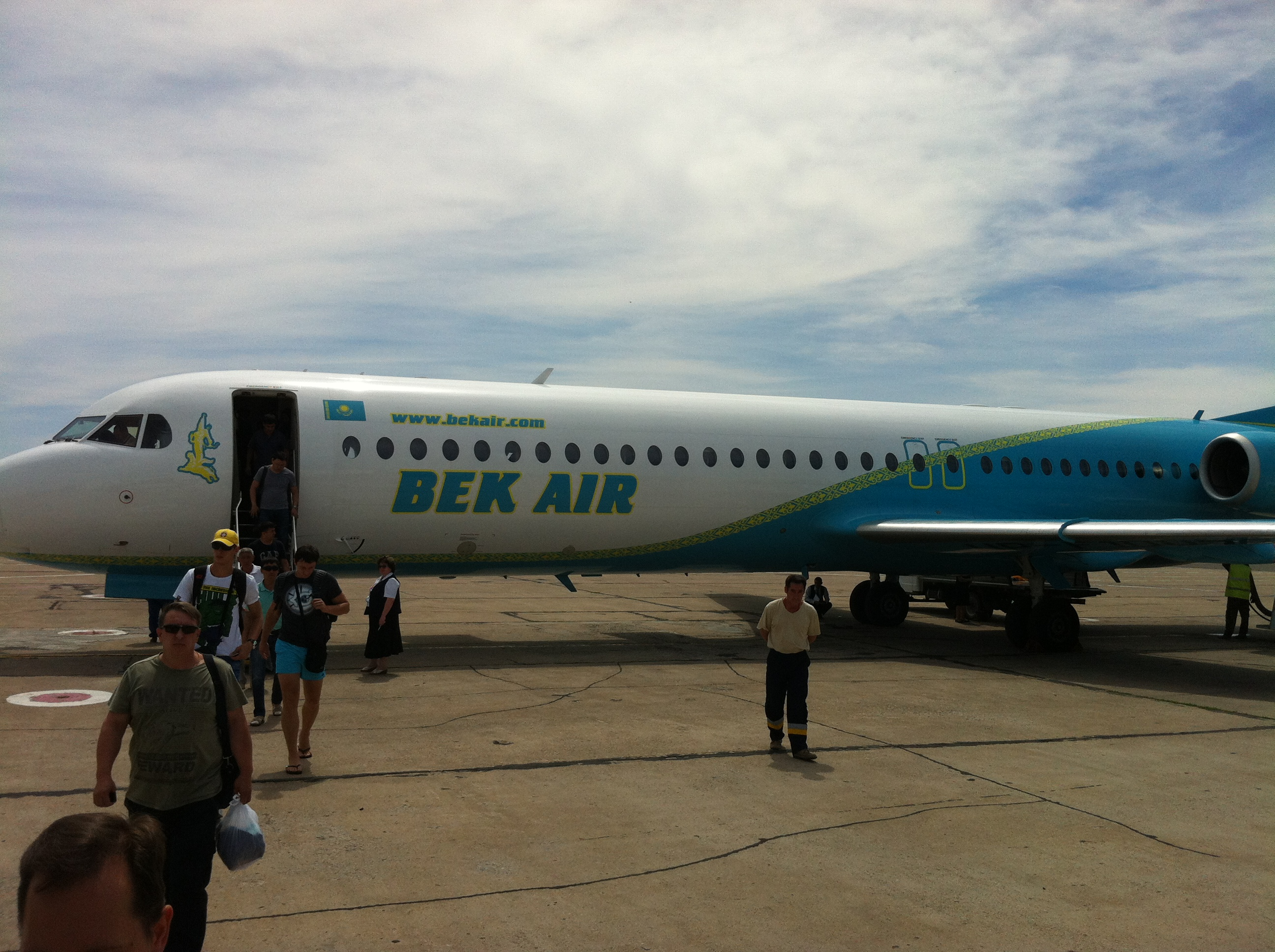
A Fokker 100 of Bek Air, seen in 2014.

As of January 2020, prior to ceasing operations, the Bek Air fleet consisted of these aircraft:

Bek Air fleet
Aircraft	In service	Orders	Passengers			Notes
Aircraft	In service	Orders	B	E	Total	Notes
Fokker 100	8	—	9	100	109	One aircraft crashed as Flight 2100.
Irkut MC-21-300	—	10	TBA			Deliveries were to begin in 2021. These aircraft were set to replace the Fokker 100s.
Total:	8	10				

=== Fleet development ===
Bek Air acquired its first Fokker 100 in 2012 after initially leasing aircraft from InvestAvia. In 2013, a second Fokker 100 was purchased from Mass Lease from the Netherlands and between 2014 and 2017, another six Fokker 100 aircraft were leased from Mass Lease. In 2019, one more Fokker 100 was bought from Air Panama. At the 2019 MAKS Air Show, at Zhukovsky International Airport, Moscow, Bek Air signed a letter of intent for 10 Irkut MC-21 aircraft. The delivery of the new aircraft was expected to be in the second half of 2021 and to replace the existing Fokker 100s.

=== Former fleet ===
In the past, Bek Air operated a fleet of Yakovlev Yak-40, Tupolev Tu-154, BAC One-Eleven, and Dassault Falcon 20 aircraft in a VIP configuration.

== Accidents and incidents ==
- On 27 March 2016, the pilots of Bek Air Flight 2041, a Fokker 100, aircraft registration UP-F1012, performed an intentional belly landing at Nursultan Nazarbayev International Airport because the aircraft's nose landing gear failed to deploy. None of the 121 passengers and crew were injured.
- On 27 December 2019, a Fokker 100 operating as Bek Air Flight 2100, headed to Nursultan Nazarbayev, crashed shortly after take-off from Almaty International Airport, killing 12 of the 98 people on board. The aircraft was unable to climb and crashed into a concrete wall and a vacant building. As a result, Bek Air's flight authorization after the accident was suspended by authorities.
