= Palair =

National airline of Macedonia

Palair Macedonian Airlines
IATA	ICAO	Call sign
3D	PMK	PALAIR
- Founded: 1991
- Ceased operations: September 1996
- Fleet size: 3
- Destinations: 9
- Headquarters: Skopje and Ohrid, Republic of Macedonia
- Key people: Vanja Bitoljanu

Palair Macedonian Airlines (Macedonian: Авиокомпанија „Палер Македонија“) was the national flag carrier of Republic of Macedonia operating from Skopje and Ohrid Airports.

== History ==
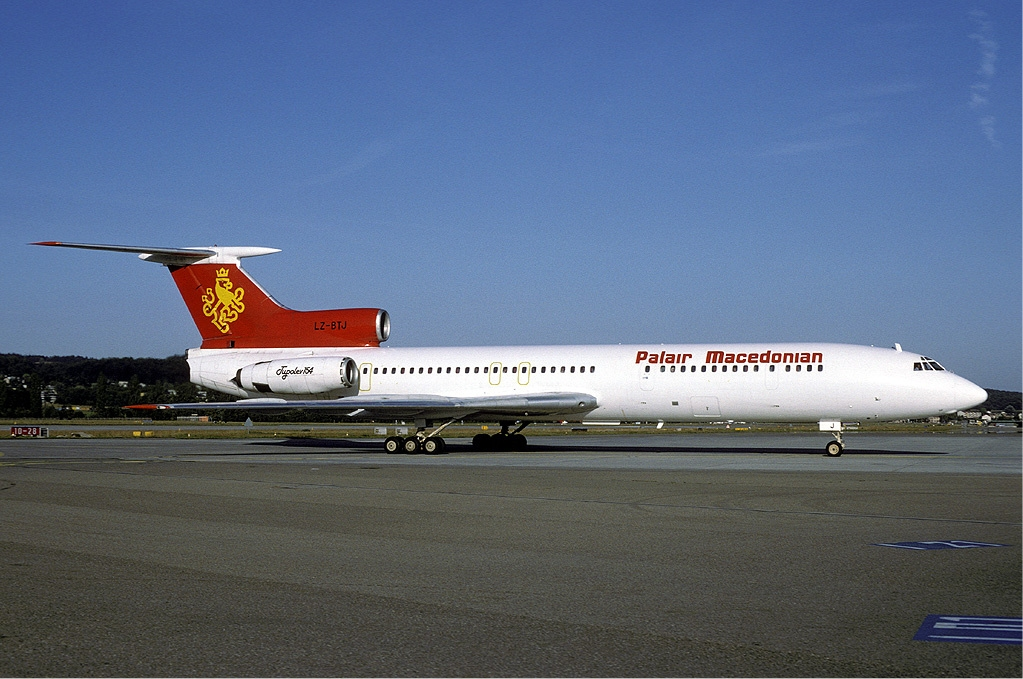
Tupolev Tu-154B-1 of Palair at Zurich Airport in 1992

During the fall of Yugoslavia, and the establishment of an Independent Macedonian republic in the early nineties, Palair Macedonian airlines was created. Their fleet began with a Tupolev Tu-154 but was soon followed by a leased Fokker F-28 and F-100, the planes were first in white and red, and later all red with yellow text. When the UN dropped sanctions against Yugoslavia in 1996, Yugoslav national airline JAT Yugoslav Airlines restarted operations, leading to a drastic drop in Palair's passenger numbers. Palair Macedonian ceased operations in September 1996.

== Fleet ==
- Tupolev Tu-154B (4) - leased from Balkan Bulgarian Airlines and bore Bulgarian registration
- Antonov An-24 (3)
- Fokker F-28 Fellowship (2)
- Fokker F-100 (4)

== Accident history ==
On 5 March 1993, Flight 301, a Fokker F-100, crashed seconds after takeoff from Skopje runway 34 on a flight to Zurich. Investigation into the accident determined the cause of the accident to be the failure of the flight crew to have the aircraft de-iced before departure. Of the 97 people on board, 83 died.

== Destinations ==
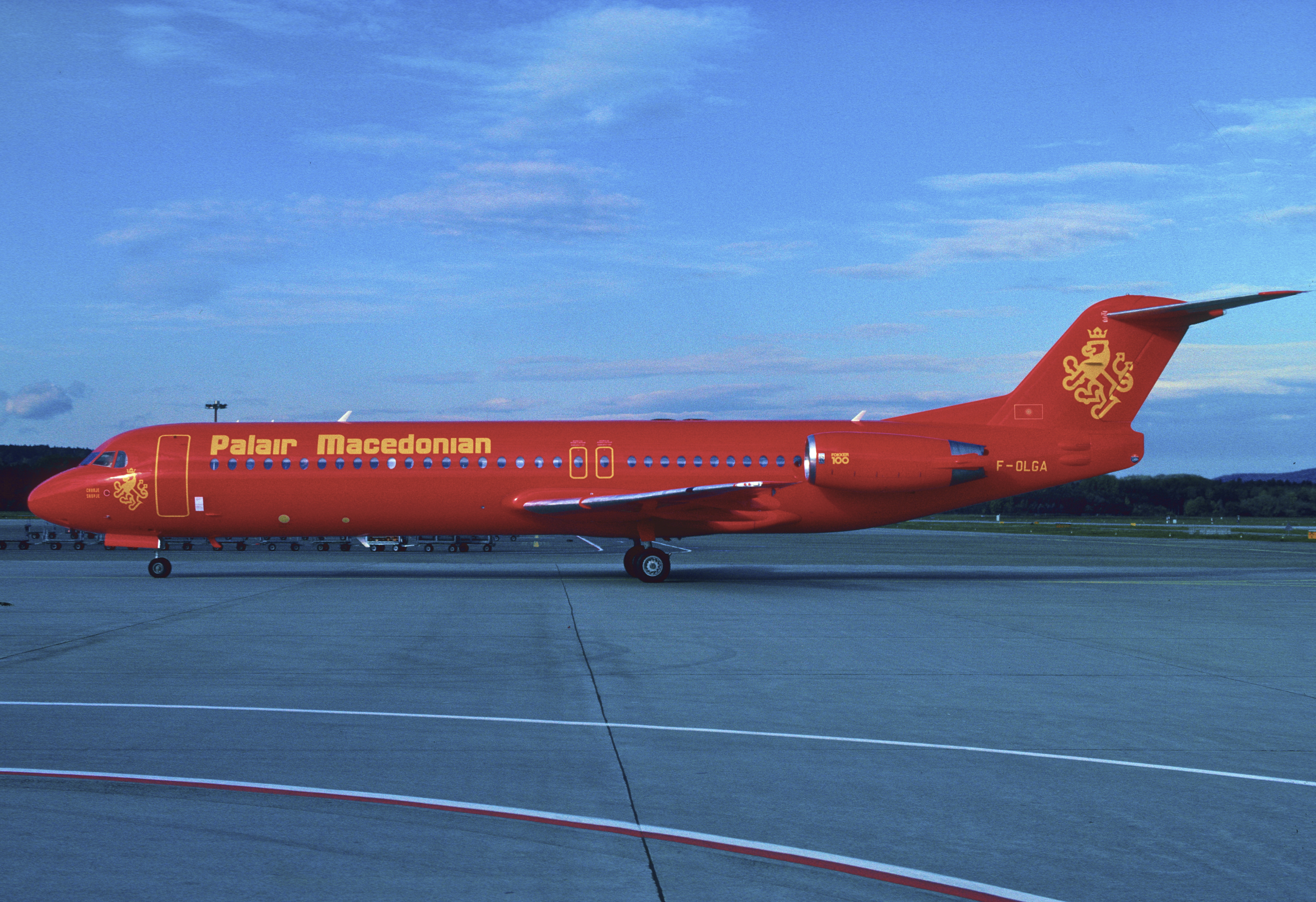
Fokker 100 of Palair, first flight at August 24, 1990.

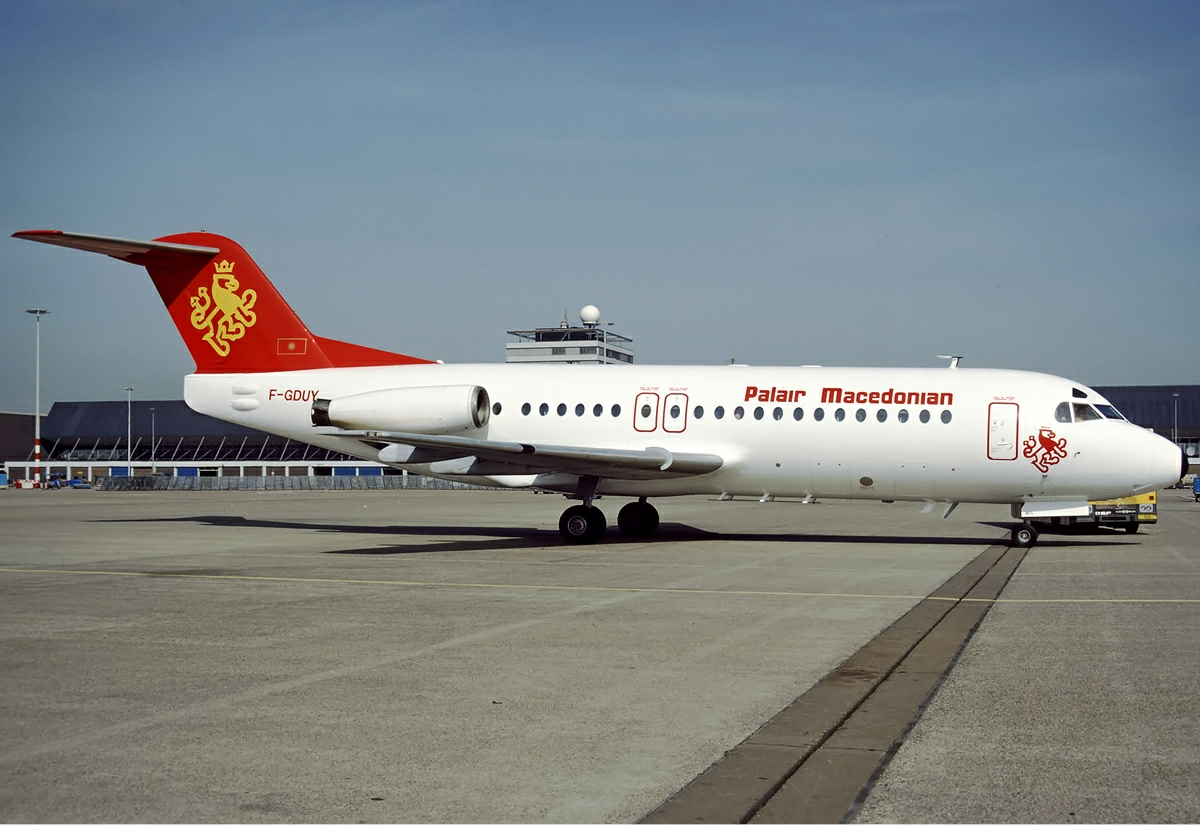
Fokker F28 Fellowship of Palair in 1993.

- Republic of Macedonia
  - Ohrid (Ohrid Airport) Base
  - Skopje (Skopje Airport) Base

=== International ===
==== Europe ====
- Austria
  - Vienna (Vienna Schwechat International Airport)
- Bulgaria
  - Sofia (Sofia International Airport)
- Germany
  - Düsseldorf (Düsseldorf Airport)
  - Hamburg (Hamburg Airport)
  - Berlin (Berlin-Schönefeld International Airport)
  - Frankfurt (Main)
  - Stuttgart (Stuttgart Airport)
- Italy
  - Rome (Leonardo Da Vinci International Airport)
  - Pisa (Pisa Airport)
- Netherlands
  - Amsterdam (Amsterdam Schiphol Airport)
- Russia
  - Moscow (Sheremetyevo)
- Switzerland
  - Zürich (Zurich International Airport)
