= Palair Macedonian Airlines Flight 301 =

1993 aviation accident

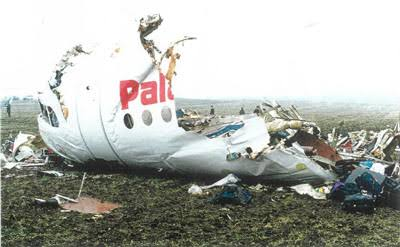
- Wreckage of Flight 301

Accident
- Date: 5 March 1993
- Summary: Crashed on take-off in snowy conditions
- Site: near Skopje Airport, Skopje, Macedonia; 41.977°N 21.616°E

Aircraft
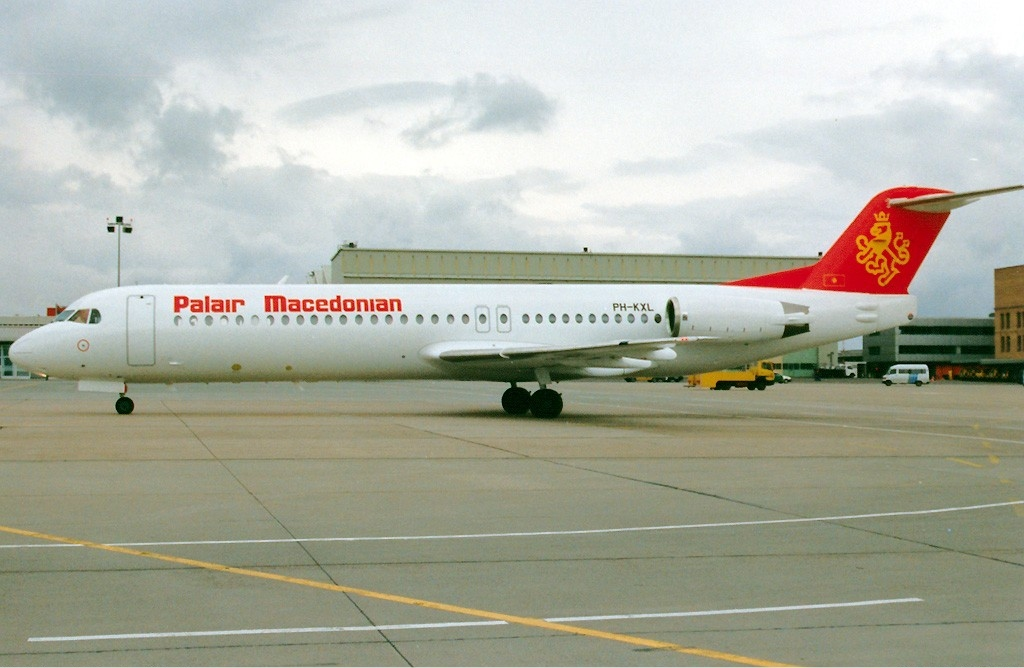
- PH-KXL, the aircraft involved in the accident, photographed two weeks before the accident
- Aircraft type: Fokker 100
- Operator: Palair Macedonian
- IATA flight No.: 3D301
- ICAO flight No.: PMK301
- Call sign: PALAIR 301
- Registration: PH-KXL
- Flight origin: Skopje Airport, Skopje, Macedonia
- Destination: Zurich-Kloten Airport, Zurich, Switzerland
- Occupants: 97
- Passengers: 92
- Crew: 5
- Fatalities: 83
- Injuries: 14
- Survivors: 14

Palair Macedonian Airlines Flight 301 was a scheduled international passenger flight from Skopje to Zurich, operated by Palair Macedonian, the then-flag carrier of Macedonia. On 5 March 1993, the aircraft operating the flight, a Fokker 100, crashed shortly after taking off from Skopje Airport in snowy conditions. Out of the 97 passengers and crew members on board, only 14 survived. At the time, it was the deadliest air disaster in North Macedonia.

The investigation of the disaster concluded that the accident was caused by ice accumulation on the wings. The aircraft had been parked in Skopje in snowy conditions. During the refueling, the ice around the wings' roots had melted due to the temperature of the fuel, while the ice on the tips hadn't. While conducting the pre-takeoff ground inspection, the crew opted not to de-ice the aircraft, thinking that most of the ice had melted and the remaining was safe enough for flying. The aircraft eventually encountered control problems during takeoff, which caused it to crash.

== Aircraft ==
The aircraft involved in the accident was a Fokker 100 with a registration code of PH-KXL and a serial number of 11393. It was equipped with two Rolls Royce Tay 650-15 engines. It had accrued a total of 188 flight hours and 136 flight cycles.

The fuel storage system for the aircraft, according to Fokker, was divided into four distinct chambers. The collector tank (CT) was the compartment with the most inboard position, and the other three compartments—MT1, MT2, and MT3— were located, respectively, from inboard to outboard. The MT3 compartment was placed at the top of the slope-shaped sections and was the most outboard of the others. Each compartment, with the exception of the CT, had ribs to allow fuel to circulate. The CT would be fully fueled during refueling, and any extra fuel would be distributed among the compartments. Less fuel will be present the farther the compartment is from the airframe.

The most outboard fuel compartment, MT3, had the most room for extra fuel due to the way the aircraft was built because it was situated in the most outboard and highest position. As a result, the MT3 tank's fuel level would be lower than that of the other tanks during refueling, which prevented the upper wing skin from making contact with the fuel of the aircraft.

== Passengers and crew ==
Flight 301 carried 92 passengers and 5 crew members. Most of the passengers were Kosovars who were going to work in Switzerland. Dutch newspaper Reformatorisch Dagblad reported that there were also several Dutch and Swiss citizens on board the aircraft.

The flight was flown by members of Aircraft Financing and Trading (AFT), a company based in the Netherlands, based on a leased contract. Both pilots had the rank of captain. The pilot in command (pilot not flying (PNF), training captain) was 49-year-old Peter Bierdrager, a Dutch national. He had accrued a total flying experience of 11,200 hours, of which 1,180 hours were in the Fokker 100. The captain-under-training (pilot flying (PF) and acting captain) was an unnamed 34-year old pilot of Macedonian nationality. He had a total flying experience of 5,580 hours, of which 65 hours were in the Fokker. Before he joined AFT, he was a pilot at Yugoslav's JAT.

== Flight ==
=== Pre-flight ===
The aircraft arrived in Skopje at 10:40 a.m. after a flight from Frankfurt, Germany. It arrived late as the flight previously had been delayed due to a malfunction on the flap position indication. The aircraft was scheduled to fly to Zurich at 11:50 a.m. with the same crew members. However, due to fears of violating work and rest regulations, a crew switch was conducted and a new set of pilots were brought in. For the flight to Zurich, the aircraft would be piloted by Captain Peter Bierdrager and his Macedonian co-pilot who was undergoing training to transfer from Boeing 737 to Fokker 100.

While the crew from Frankfurt was staying in the hotel, the aircraft was parked in Skopje in snowy conditions. A flight station engineer (FSE) then came to inspect the aircraft. A brief check was conducted on the exterior of the aircraft. During the inspection, at 11:00 a.m. the aircraft was refueled with approximately 2,000 litres (440 imp gal; 530 US gal) of fuel. The replacement crew eventually arrived in Skopje approximately 30 minutes after the refueling and immediately boarded the aircraft. Upon arrival in Skopje, the company's dispatcher was requested by Captain Peter to get information regarding the weather. The dispatcher eventually came into the cockpit and briefed the crew about the incoming weather. In response to the information, Captain Peter decided to add an additional 907 kilograms (2,000 lb) of fuel. The second refueling was commenced at around 11:40 a.m. and another exterior inspection was conducted.

Prior to the inspection, the dispatcher had briefly checked the aircraft for presence of ice and snow. After scraping his hand over the wing leading edges, he discovered that there was neither ice nor snow on the wings and it was particularly wet because all of the ice and snow had melted. This was eventually confirmed again during the second refueling when the FSE and Palair's ground crew members conducted a walk-around to check for the presence of ice and snow on the aircraft. Standing on a baggage cart, the FSE performed a "tactile check" by rubbing his hand over the wings. He noticed that there was some melted snow on the right wing and that the leading edge of the wing was clear of ice and snow. One of the ground crew then tried to confirm it and conducted a tactile check as well, collecting a stroke of snow from the inner flap of the right wing before showing it to the FSE. With the weather condition being taken into account, a discussion on whether the aircraft should be de-iced eventually ensued.

After a brief discussion with the ground crew, the FSE concluded that the aircraft did not need to be de-iced. He went back into the cockpit and told both pilots about his findings. The pilots immediately agreed and continued their routine checks.

=== Accident ===
Flight 301 was an international scheduled passenger flight originating from the Macedonian capital of Skopje with a final destination of Zurich, Switzerland. The loadsheet that had been provided by the airport agent listed a total of 91 passengers and 5 crew members. The FSE was later added as one of the passengers.

After having been parked in the snow for more than one and a half hours, the crew contacted Skopje to request start-up clearance. Start-up was conducted soon after, and the aircraft was set for taxiing onto the runway. The engine anti-icing was set to on, the ignition went into automatic, and the flaps were set to 8 degrees. The crew was cleared to line up at Runway 34. Arriving on Runway 34, the crew decided to use the standard V_{R} speed of 134 knots (248 km/h; 154 mph).

At 11:11 a.m., the aircraft was cleared for take-off to Switzerland. At the time, there was moderate snow and visibility was limited to 900 metres (3,000 ft); observation on the ground confirmed that the visibility was poor enough that the end of the runway could not be seen from Flight 301's position.

05:20 (Note: Represents the time elapsed since device started recording)	Captain	Palair 301 is ready
05:23	ATC	Call you back shortly Sir
05:24	Captain	Roger
05:34	ATC	301 cleared for take off wind is from 010 degrees 3 knots
05:35	Captain	301 cleared for take off

Flight 301 became airborne 28 seconds after its takeoff clearance and, according to the ATC who witnessed the take-off, vanished beyond the snow. Just two seconds after taking off from Runway 34, the aircraft began to shake violently. The aircraft was climbing at a rate of 900 feet per minute (270 m/min) and the crew called out positive climb rate. As the crew was announcing, the aircraft suddenly rolled to the right at an angle of 11 degrees, surprising the crew. The first officer then tried to counteract this by applying a right wing-up aileron input at full force. The wings slowly returned to its previous position and the angle gradually decreased.

Intending to increase the climb, the first officer raised the nose to 10 degrees. The landing gear was retracted, and the aircraft was climbing. However, within a span of three seconds, Flight 301 rolled severely to the left with a bank angle of 50 degrees. Perturbed by the situation, Captain Bierdrager exclaimed "Ah shit!". The crew did not understand the anomalies they were facing at the time. Ailerons and rudder input were immediately applied to correct the attitude of the aircraft. The first officer tried hard to roll the aircraft to the right by making a full right aileron input.

05:36	First Officer	Gear up
05:38	Captain	Gear up
05:39	Captain	Ah shit!
05:40	First Officer	What is it?!
05:40	Captain	Oh! Deselect!

Thinking that the autopilot was at fault, Captain Bierdrager exclaimed "Oh! Deselect!". They tried to turn it off, but then discovered that the autopilot had never been engaged. While applying the full right aileron input, the aircraft immediately rolled to the right at a dangerous angle of 63 degrees. The FSE who was sitting at the cockpit jump seat shouted "Nose up!" as the aircraft plunged towards the ground.

As the aircraft continued to dive, the crew pulled the elevator to almost at its maximum. The angle of attack increased, but the stall warning began to blare inside the cockpit. The aircraft eventually entered a sink rate of 2,000 ft/min and the alarm system warned the crew on the excessive sink rate.

05:43	Commentary	Sound of autopilot chime 2x
05:45	Commentary	Sound of sink rate warning 2x
05:48	Unidentified	Oh...
05:48	Commentary	End of recording

The crew tried to recover the aircraft, and it appeared to be successful as the right angle started to decrease, down to as much as 15 degrees. However, as it approached the ground, the right wing dipped again, reaching 90 degrees. The tip eventually contacted the ground and grazed a road, cutting the airport's perimeter fence and detaching from the aircraft due to the collision. The aircraft, meanwhile, slammed into the ground with its right side and broke up. The cockpit, parts of the front cabin, and the tail surfaces separated from the airframe, while the front portion and the whole right side of the aircraft were immediately destroyed. The resulting collision caused the fuel to ignite and the aircraft burst into flames.

A substantial part of the aft fuselage remained intact after the crash. This was where most survivors were located. Despite this, the aft fuselage had been penetrated by the detached right engine during the crash, causing a fire that eventually destroyed the whole section.

=== Initial aftermath ===
The sound of the crash was loud enough to be heard by a United Nations Peacekeeper Pilot who was walking on a ramp nearby. He immediately offered Skopje Tower via telephone to investigate the source of the noise. Using a Bell 212, the wreckage was immediately found nearly 0.5 km from the airport. The wreckage was spread over an area of 220 x 40 meters. After landing at the crash site, the personnel quickly notified other emergency services and nearby UNPROFOR army base about the accident and transported seven survivors from the area. The Bell 212 returned to the crash site two more times and evacuated more survivors. Shortly after, the Macedonian emergency services arrived at the site and commenced the search and rescue operation. As many as twenty survivors, of whom five were in critical condition, were transported to the hospital in Skopje. However, four survivors would later be pronounced dead on arrival. Several others succumbed to their injuries. Remarkably, the only surviving crew member, a flight attendant, suffered only minor injuries.

== Investigation ==
Following the crash, the Macedonian government immediately set up the State Accident Investigation Commission (SAIC), which was led by Yugoslavia's Ministry of Transport and Communications. Being the state of both manufacturer and registry, the Netherlands was involved in the investigation. Representatives from Rolls-Royce and Swissair were also invited to assist. The French BEA helped encode the FDR and CVR contents.

The result of the flight recorder readout would eventually be presented with a flight simulation, which would take months to complete, the Dutch government noted. The Macedonian government, however, wished to wrap up the investigation as quickly as possible. The final report on the crash was released by the SAIC in May 1993, just one month after the catastrophe. The Dutch government carried out additional investigations after being dissatisfied with the report's final draft. The Dutch government met with Swiss representatives after media reports that the Chairman of SAIC had declared the investigation to be finished and urged the Macedonian government to continue the investigation, which was agreed by the government, albeit reluctantly.

In January 1994, following a meeting that had been convened by representatives of the investigation team, parties involved in the investigation agreed to publish the summary of the investigation and the probable cause of the crash to the press. Substantial disagreements still persisted between both parties and further meetings were conducted. In January 1996, inquiry by the Netherlands regarding the official final report was eventually responded to by Macedonian representatives, who explained that further findings from the Netherlands had been disregarded and added that the May 1993 final report that had been provided by the Macedonian government would be declared the official final report and would be presented to ICAO. The Dutch government ultimately decided to produce a separate investigation report into the crash, and the inquiry would later be the only one to be publicly released.

=== Icing ===
The aircraft crashed immediately after takeoff in a violent manner, with its right wing being the first to contact the ground at a perpendicular angle. Account from the surviving flight attendant suggested that the aircraft had suffered control problems during takeoff. The aircraft could be felt shaking while lifting off from Skopje, and seconds later it began to sway violently to the left and right before plummeting towards the ground.

The result of the flight recorder readout confirmed that the aircraft had encountered problems with its controls immediately after takeoff. Just seconds after lifting off, the aircraft began to shake, and the right wing began to drop. After slowly returning to wing level, the wings began to dip again, and the aircraft swayed to the left. The crew tried to recover the aircraft by making a right turn input, but the aircraft suddenly turned towards the right with a dangerous bank angle. The issues that the crew were facing could not be resolved, and they eventually lost control of the aircraft.

Weather data collected by investigators showed that there was light to moderate snow prior to and during the accident. Airport workers reported that the snow melted when it touched the ground. Prior to the accident, there was no visible snow on the runway, taxiway or apron. Investigators confirmed that it was a wet snow, that is, snow mixed with rain. Temperature at the airport was recorded to be at 0 °C (32 °F), while the aircraft itself was experiencing an evaporative cooling effect, demonstrated by the recorded total air temperature value of −2 °C (28 °F). The aircraft was exposed to wet snow and the temperature was lower than the freezing dew point, a conducive condition for airframe icing.

The presence of snow on the wings eventually affected the aerodynamics of the aircraft. The recorded data indicated that due to the contamination, the aircraft's lift capability was limited to half of what it was capable of. The aircraft would not normally stall if the nose angle was below 16.5, but on the day of the accident, the aircraft was already struggling to takeoff when the angle of attack had just reached 10 degrees. When the angle of attack exceeded 10 degrees, the aircraft began to enter a stall and vibrations were noted. Whenever the nose was lowered to below 10 degrees, the aircraft managed to build-up its airflow and recovered from the situation.

Analysis made by investigators suggested that the ice contamination was likely to be located on the front part of the wing, particularly close to the leading edges of the aircraft. This was indicated by the massive increase in drag and loss of control on roll damping and roll control when the angle of attack exceeded 10 degrees. The analysis further suggested that the outer parts of the wings were probably the ones that got contaminated, even though it did not exclude the possibility of contamination on the inner parts of the wings.

Estimation conducted by investigators showed that the aircraft had been exposed with light precipitation, which later increased to moderate, for 1 hour and 15 minutes, with an unspecified amount of thickness. For another 15–20 minutes after the walk-around check, the aircraft was further exposed by snow, which presumably worsened the wing contamination. Due to the prevailing weather condition, investigators believed that the aircraft's wing upper surface had been covered with a thin layer of snow and possibly frozen to the skin.

Based on the available data, there was no indication that a technical malfunction had occurred on board. Many people had managed to observe the aircraft and stated that there was no damage on the wings, and the wreckage indicated that there was no pre-existing damage. The data, however, supported the theory that there was wing contamination on board. The issue could not have appeared had the crew de-iced the aircraft prior to takeoff.

=== De-icing ===
The investigation board concluded that, based on the weather conditions and the aircraft’s status, a de-icing procedure should have been carried out. According to the manual, either the FSE or the captain was responsible for conducting the external inspection before de-icing, while the final decision to de-ice rested with the captain as the commander of the flight.

The crew had checked the aircraft for snow and ice at least twice prior to takeoff. The first inspection took place during the initial refueling, and the findings indicated that de-icing was unnecessary. After the second refueling, another inspection was performed, which resulted in the same conclusion.

This inspection was conducted by the FSE, accompanied by three ground crew members. According to the ground crew’s statements, the inspection was not carried out uniformly across the wings; instead, most of the attention was focused on the inner sections near the wing roots, particularly on the right side. The FSE first inspected the wing by walking along its front and rear edges, then used a baggage cart to reach the surface more closely. When he touched the wing, he noticed that the snow had melted and that his hands were wet. After completing the brief check, he discussed the possibility of de-icing with the ground crew. One of the crew members showed him slush taken from a flap, reinforcing his impression that the aircraft was largely free of ice and that any remaining residue would likely shed during takeoff. Based on this, he decided de-icing was not required.

Investigators later determined that the FSE could not have thoroughly inspected the wings for ice, as his position on the baggage cart placed him only near the wing roots. His assessment was therefore based on the condition of the inner wing sections rather than the outer areas, which were more likely to have been contaminated by ice.

After deciding against de-icing, the FSE informed the cockpit crew, who accepted his conclusion without question. His expertise and his role as a representative of Swissair—an airline known for its strong safety culture—appeared to influence the crew’s trust in his judgment. The pilots remained in the cockpit and did not perform their own external inspection, focusing instead on cockpit preparations and instrument checks.

The investigation also suggested that both the crew and the FSE may have misinterpreted the weather conditions. Snow had begun falling just as they arrived at the airport, and during their drive the snowfall was light, melting immediately upon contact with the ground. Once at the aircraft, the pilots went straight into the cockpit and did not closely monitor the weather. The FSE’s earlier observation that the snow on the wings had melted reinforced their belief that the conditions were not hazardous. Although the crew noticed heavier snowfall during taxi, they still considered it safe since the snow continued to melt on the pavement. They likely did not realize that the falling snow could freeze onto the cold wing surfaces.

Ultimately, because both the FSE and the flight crew believed the snow posed no threat to flight operations, the aircraft was not de-iced.

=== Fuel distribution ===
The crew chose not to perform de-icing, believing that most of the snow on the aircraft had already melted and that the remaining slush would slide off during takeoff without posing a hazard. While the ice near the wing roots had indeed melted, the ice on the outer sections of the wings had not. This discrepancy was likely due to the way the Fokker 100’s fuel distribution system functioned.

During flight at high altitudes, the fuel inside the tanks had cooled to temperatures lower than the surrounding air. Upon arrival at the airport—where the outside temperature was below freezing—falling snow adhered to the wings and froze. When the aircraft was refueled, the incoming fuel was warm enough to melt the ice that had accumulated over the wing areas closest to the fuselage, as the wing skin in those sections was colder than the fresh fuel. The center tank (CT) and the inboard main tanks (MT1) warmed rapidly when refueled, causing the ice in those areas to melt. However, due to the aircraft’s uneven fuel distribution system, the warming effect did not extend to the outer sections of the wings.

The fuel tanks were arranged in a series of slope-shaped chambers, with MT3—positioned near the wing tip—being the farthest from the fuselage. Stringers inside each compartment restricted fuel movement, resulting in each tank filling progressively but to different levels. As a result, every compartment experienced a different degree of warming. A “fuel temperature test” conducted by Fokker confirmed this: the farther a compartment was from the airframe, the slower its temperature increased. The tanks nearest the wing roots warmed significantly, while the tanks near the wing tips remained largely unaffected. Consequently, the ice in these outer areas did not melt.

The warming effect from the first refueling persisted until the second refueling, causing the ice near the wing roots to continue melting. This likely led observers to believe that most of the ice on the aircraft had already disappeared, even though the outer wing sections remained frozen due to the fuel system’s uneven heating. Investigators also noted that melting on the inboard wing would have occurred later regardless, as the activation of the booster pumps would generate additional heat in that region.

=== Lack of attention ===
Fokker conducted multiple studies regarding the effects of ice on its aircraft. Using 1–2 millimetres (0.039–0.079 in) of ice spread over the entire wing, an analysis regarding its effect on the aircraft's lift was carried out. The result indicated that even with such thin ice, the aircraft lost a total of 35% of its maximum obtainable wing lift, and the nose could never exceed 5–6 degrees. If the same amount of ice were distributed near the wings' leading edges and outer parts, the effects would be even more severe.

Unfortunately, the devastating effects of icing on Fokker aircraft were already well known in the aviation industry. The design of both the Fokker F100 and its sister craft, the Fokker F28 Fellowship, made both aircraft more vulnerable to icing than any other type, as relatively small amounts of ice could produce extreme effects on the controllability of the aircraft. The aircraft was more likely to lose more lift due to its heavily swept wings that were not equipped with leading edge slats, causing it to be more susceptible to smaller amounts of ice. The issue had caused multiple deadly accidents in the past. Notable accidents that were cited in the final report included the crashes of Air Ontario Flight 1363 near Dryden in 1989 and USAir Flight 405 near LaGuardia Airport in 1992. The latest crash resulted in the release of a personal briefing on recent studies regarding the effects of contaminated wings by Fokker, emphasizing the dangerous effect that could be inflicted by a small amount of ice on the controllability of their aircraft.

The investigation eventually revealed that the operator of the aircraft, AFT, did not include de-icing procedures in adverse weather conditions in their Fokker F100 manual. The operator's Standard Operating Procedure (SOP) and operating manual also did not publish any de-icing procedures that were applicable for ground operations during bad weather conditions. Additionally, neither the operator's Standard Operating Procedure (SOP) nor operating handbook published any de-icing techniques that might be used for ground operations in inclement weather. The manual provided generic explanations for the meaning of icing and other relevant concepts, but it lacked specific guidance on when anti-icing should be applied. The board ruled that each operator was required to publish particular policies or procedures regarding aircraft operations in cold weather and submit them in advance of the operation.

=== Conclusion ===
The investigation board concluded the cause of the crash as follow:

The Board determined that impact with the ground in a steep right bank shortly after liftoff was caused by loss of roll controllability due to contamination of the wings with ice. This situation resulted from an omission to carry out spraying of the aircraft with deicing or anti-icing fluid in meteorological conditions conducive to icing, due to a lack of ice-awareness of the flight crew and the Flying Station Engineer. Contributing factors were a lack of common background and procedures in a difficult multi-sources operational environment.

A total of six recommendations were published by the board, covering issues regarding the training of crew and inclusion of more specific de-icing procedures, review of the existing regulations regarding air operation, and further procedural clean-up. In the wake of the crash, Dutch investigation agency RLD issued an airworthiness directive that stated that every operator of Fokker 100 was mandated to conduct physical hands-on check for possible ice contamination on the wing leading edge and wing upper surfaces.

== See also ==
- List of accidents and incidents involving commercial aircraft
- List of aircraft accidents and incidents resulting in at least 50 fatalities
- Avioimpex Flight 110, a 20 November 1993 aviation disaster that took place in Macedonia

Similar incidents

- Air Ontario Flight 1363
- USAir Flight 405
- Bek Air Flight 2100
