= Sandalore =

Names
- Preferred IUPAC name 3-Methyl-5-(2,2,3-trimethylcyclopent-3-en-1-yl)pentan-2-ol
- Other names Sandal pentanol

Identifiers
CAS Number	65113-99-7
3D model (JSmol)	Interactive image
ChemSpider	93216
ECHA InfoCard	100.059.485
EC Number	265-453-0
PubChem CID	103212
UNII	1XL3NL51UU
- InChI: InChI=1S/C14H26O/c1-10(12(3)15)6-8-13-9-7-11(2)14(13,4)5/h7,10,12-13,15H,6,8-9H2,1-5H3 Key: NGYMOTOXXHCHOC-UHFFFAOYSA-N
- SMILES: CC1=CCC(C1(C)C)CCC(C)C(C)O

Properties
Chemical formula	C_{14}H_{26}O
Molar mass	210.361 g·mol^{−1}

Hazards
- GHS labelling
Pictograms	(GHS07: Exclamation mark) (GHS09: Environmental hazard)
Signal word	Warning
Hazard statements	H319, H411
Precautionary statements	P264, P273, P280, P305+P351+P338, P337+P313, P391, P501
- Except where otherwise noted, data are given for materials in their standard state (at 25 °C [77 °F], 100 kPa). Infobox references

Sandalore is a synthetic sandalwood odorant with odor in some ways similar to sandalwood and consequently used in perfumes, emollients, and skin cleaning agents. Sandalore, and the similar brahmanol, have been identified as agonists of the cutaneous olfactory receptor OR2AT4, and found to induce strong Ca^{2+} signals in cultured human keratinocytes. The long-term stimulation of keratinocytes with sandalore positively affected cell proliferation and migration, and regeneration of keratinocyte monolayers in an in vitro wound scratch assay (i.e., sandalore stimulation also enhanced epidermal "wound healing" in human skin organ cultures). Natural sandalwood oil and other synthetic sandalwood odorants did not have the same effect.
