= 1-Nonyl-4-phenol =

Names
- Preferred IUPAC name 4-Nonylphenol
- Other names Phenol, nonyl-; 4-Nonylphenol; p-Nonylphenol; para-Nonylphenol; p-n-Nonylphenol; 4-n-Nonylphenol

Identifiers
CAS Number	104-40-5
3D model (JSmol)	Interactive image
ChEBI	CHEBI:34440
ChEMBL	ChEMBL153062
ChemSpider	1688
ECHA InfoCard	100.002.909
PubChem CID	1752
UNII	I03GBV4WEL
CompTox Dashboard (EPA)	DTXSID5033836
- InChI: InChI=1S/C15H24O/c1-2-3-4-5-6-7-8-9-14-10-12-15(16)13-11-14/h10-13,16H,2-9H2,1H3 Key: IGFHQQFPSIBGKE-UHFFFAOYSA-N
- SMILES: CCCCCCCCCC1=CC=C(C=C1)O

Properties
Chemical formula	C_{15}H_{24}O
Molar mass	220.356 g·mol^{−1}
Appearance	White crystals
Density	0.94
Melting point	43 to 45 °C (109 to 113 °F; 316 to 318 K)
Boiling point	180 to 181 °C (356 to 358 °F; 453 to 454 K)
- Except where otherwise noted, data are given for materials in their standard state (at 25 °C [77 °F], 100 kPa). verify (what is ?) Infobox references

1-Nonyl-4-phenol is an organic compound consisting of an n-nonyl group attached to the 4-position of phenol. The related nonylphenols with branched nonyl groups are commercially important detergents. It is used with mixed-metals stabilizers for heat stabilization of plastic and is a starting material for producing phenol resins. 1-Nonyl-4-phenol is insoluble in water, but soluble in organic compounds like benzene and heptane.
