= Α-Santalol =

Chemical compound

α-Santalol

Names
- IUPAC name (Z)-5-(2,3-Dimethyltricyclol[2.2.1.0^{2,6}]hept-3-yl)-2-methylpent-2-en-1-ol

Identifiers
CAS Number	115-71-9
3D model (JSmol)	Interactive image
ChemSpider	16736011
ECHA InfoCard	100.003.730
EC Number	204-102-8
KEGG	C09719
PubChem CID	5281531
UNII	15X09F2755
CompTox Dashboard (EPA)	DTXSID9051587
- InChI: InChI=1S/C15H24O/c1-10(9-16)5-4-6-14(2)11-7-12-13(8-11)15(12,14)3/h5,11-13,16H,4,6-9H2,1-3H3/b10-5- Key: PDEQKAVEYSOLJX-YHYXMXQVSA-N
- SMILES: C/C(CO)=C\CCC3(C)C1CC2C(C1)C23C

Properties
Chemical formula	C_{15}H_{24}O
Molar mass	220.356 g·mol^{−1}
Appearance	Liquid
Density	0.9770 g/cm^{3}
Boiling point	166 °C (331 °F; 439 K)
Solubility in water	Practically insoluble
Solubility in ethanol	Soluble
Solubility in diethyl ether	Soluble
Chiral rotation ([α]_{D})	+10.3°
Refractive index (n_{D})	1.5017

Hazards
- GHS labelling
Pictograms	(GHS07: Exclamation mark)
Signal word	Warning
Hazard statements	H317
Precautionary statements	P261, P272, P280, P302+P352, P321, P333+P313, P363, P501
NFPA 704 (fire diamond)	0 1 0

Related compounds
Related terpenes	β-Santalol
- Except where otherwise noted, data are given for materials in their standard state (at 25 °C [77 °F], 100 kPa). Infobox references

α-Santalol (alpha-santalol) is an organic compound that is classified as a sesquiterpene. It comprises about 55% of the oil of sandalwood, another less abundant component being β-santalol. As of 2002, about 60 tons of sandalwood oil are produced annually by steam distillation of the heartwood of Santalum album. It is a valued component for perfumes. The substance has an aroma that is woody and characteristically sandalwood. α-Santalol has also been studied for potential medical use, as it shows anti-inflammatory, antimicrobial, and anticancer effects in experimental models.

Because of concerns about the sustainability of sandalwood cultivation, scientists have developed routes to α-santalol and β-santalol via fermentation using transgenic Rhodobacter sphaeroides. BASF launched its version under their Isobionics brand in July 2020.
