= Heat stabilization =

Heat stabilization is an additive-free preservation technology for tissue samples which stops degradation and changes immediately and permanently. Heat stabilization uses rapid conductive heating, under controlled pressure, to generate a fast, homogeneous and irreversible thermal denaturation of proteins, resulting in a complete and permanent elimination of all enzymatic activity that would otherwise cause further biological changes to the tissue sample ex vivo. Due to the permanent inactivation of enzymes, heat stabilization overcomes the drawbacks of conventional tissue sample preservation techniques, such as snap-freezing followed by inhibitors.

Understanding the role of proteins, peptides and small molecules in normal and diseased tissue is crucial to defining their potential use as drugs, drug targets or disease biomarkers. Yet biological changes begin the moment tissue is removed from its native environment. Dramatic alterations at the molecular level occur within seconds e.g. changed metabolism, catabolic fragmentation of large molecules (such as ATP) occurs in order to release energy, leading to disrupted control mechanisms, phosphorylation states are altered and proteins begin to degrade. As a consequence vital information may be lost or distorted, leading to inter-sample variation, risk of incorrect data interpretation and potentially misleading conclusions.

Heat stabilization offers significant advantages over conventional approaches to preventing biological change. It can be used to replace snap freezing followed by inhibitors, pH changes, organic solvents or cross-linking. It can also be used with frozen tissue, allowing stabilization of stored samples. Heat stabilization can be used for almost any kind of tissue sample, and has been verified to be compatible with many downstream analytical techniques such as mass spectrometry, phospho-shotgun, MALDI imaging, Western blot, 1D and 2D gels, reversed-phased protein arrays, RIA and ELISA. The method also allows samples collected and handled in bio safety level laboratories to be subsequently handled outside such labs after treatment.
