= Ground deicing of aircraft =

Removal of frost, ice, or frozen contaminants

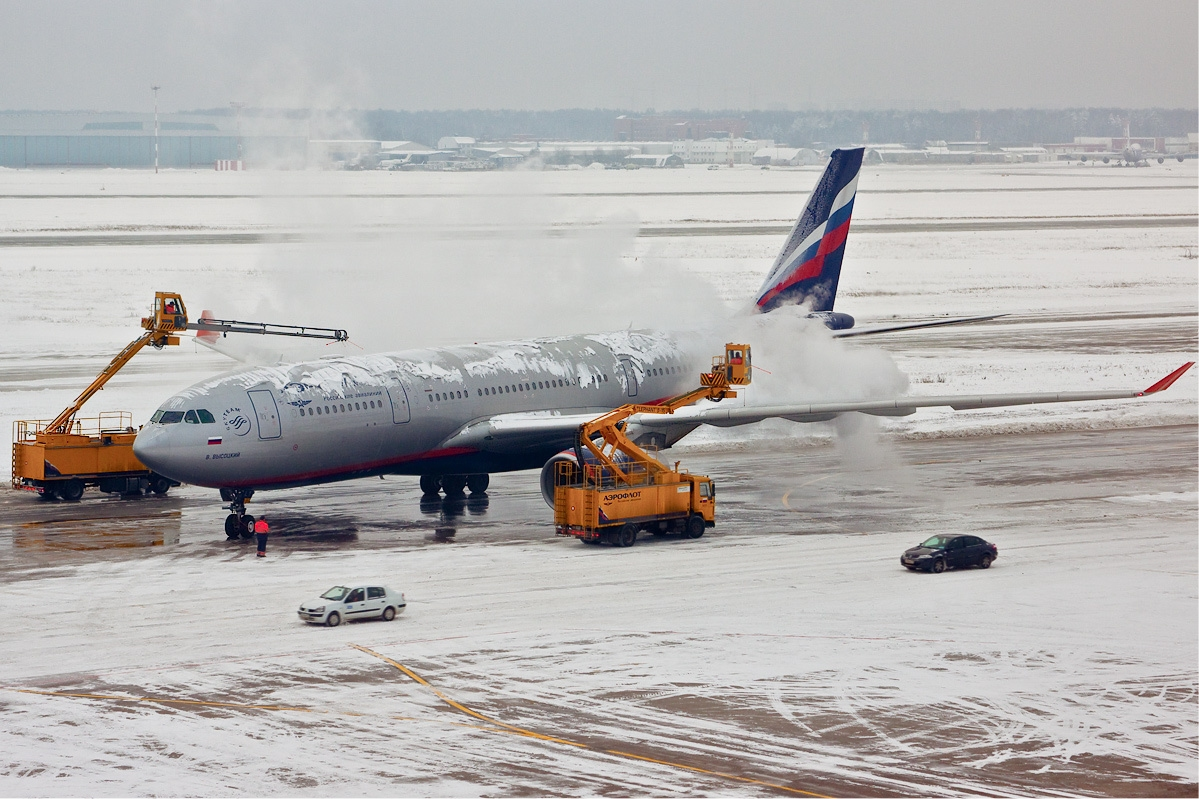
Deicing an Airbus A330

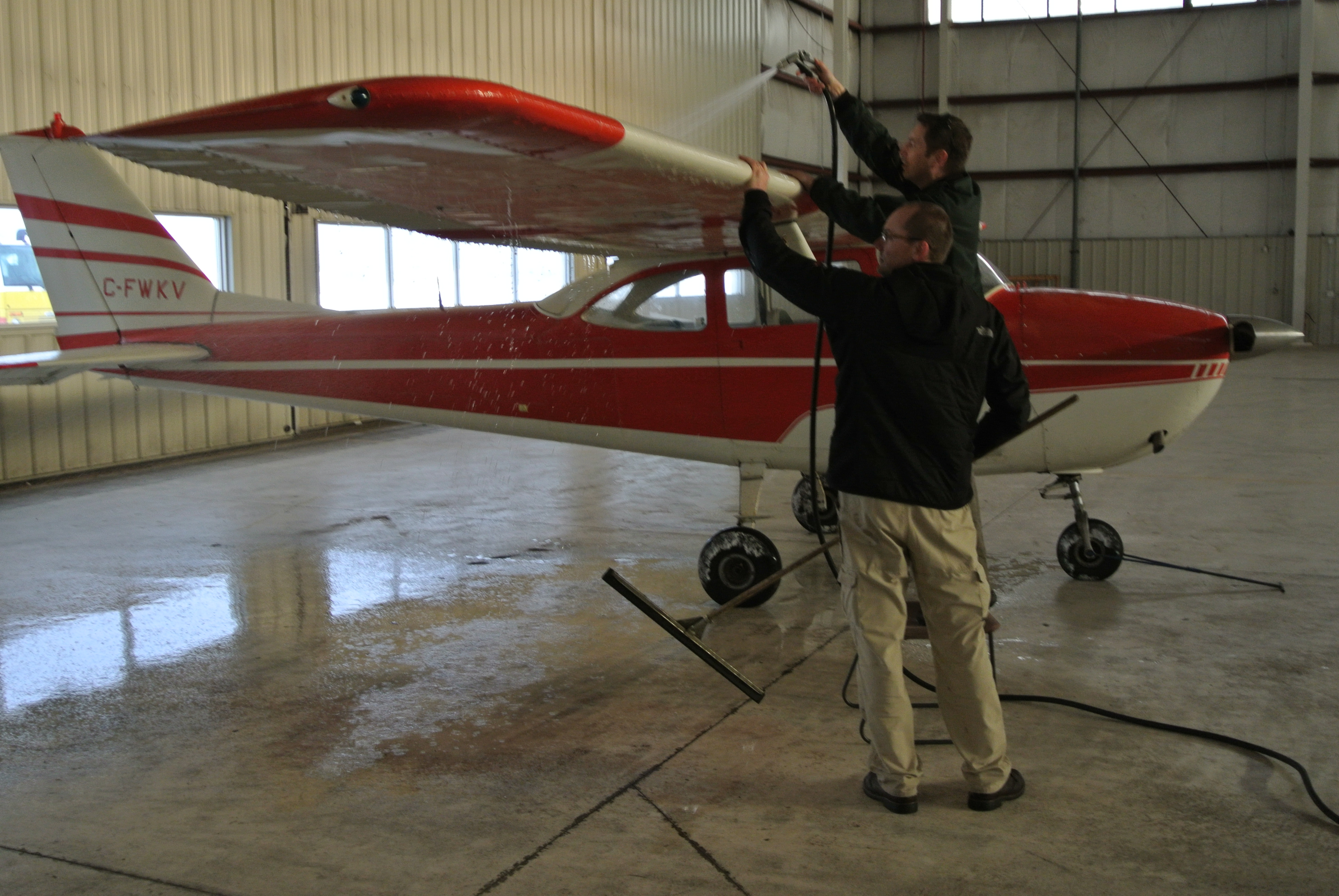
Deicing a Cessna 172, Edmonton, Canada

In aviation, ground deicing of aircraft is the process of removing surface frost, ice or frozen contaminants on aircraft surfaces before an aircraft takes off. This prevents even a small amount of surface frost or ice on aircraft surfaces from severely impacting flight performance. Frozen contaminants on surfaces can also break off in flight, damaging engines or control surfaces.

Major airports in climates conducive to ground icing will have some kind of ground deicing systems in place. Ultimately it is the pilot-in-command's responsibility to ensure that all necessary deicing processes are carried out before departure.

Planes are often equipped with ice protection systems or icephobic surface coatings to control in-flight atmospheric icing; however, those are not considered substitutes for adequate ground based deicing.

== Purpose ==
Aircraft flight characteristics are extremely sensitive to the slightest amount of surface irregularity, in particular that are caused by frost, ice, or snow. These may interrupt smooth airflow over surfaces; add weight to the airframe; interfere with control surfaces; or come loose in flight and cause impact damage to the airframe or engines. A layer as thin as 0.4 millimetres (1/64 in) can have a significant effect on lift, drag, and control.

Ground icing can occur even when the ambient temperature is above freezing, via a process known as "cold soaking." In this situation, ice is formed because the fuel in the wing tanks is below freezing, causing condensation on the wings which subsequently freezes.

Many aircraft accidents have been attributed by post-accident investigations to aircraft operators' failure to remove surface frost, ice, and/or snow prior to takeoff. Such accidents include:

- 1946 Railway Air Services Dakota crash
- Air Florida Flight 90
- Air Ontario Flight 1363
- Arrow Air Flight 1285R
- Continental Airlines Flight 1713
- Scandinavian Airlines System Flight 751
- West Wind Aviation Flight 282
- Palair Macedonian Airlines Flight 301

== Process ==
A ground crew manually de-icing a de Havilland Dragon Rapide

Before every flight the pilot-in-command of an aircraft is responsible for inspecting the airframe for frost, ice, and snow. This can be done visually or by means of specially designed Ground Ice Detection Systems.

If frost, ice, or snow contamination is observed or suspected, the aircraft must undergo a deicing procedure before takeoff, using one or more of the methods listed below.

A complicating factor is that ambient atmospheric conditions may be such that contamination starts to build up again immediately after deicing is complete. For example, it might be snowing. The deicing process must take this into account to ensure that the aircraft remains free of contamination until it takes off. Typically this involves adding a viscous "anti-icing" fluid which will remain on the wings and immediately melt falling snow.

The time between deicing/anti-icing treatments and take-off is called the "holdover time". Various aviation authorities (e.g., the United States' Federal Aviation Administration (FAA), Transport Canada) publish detailed tables giving the hold over time for various combinations of deicing fluids and atmospheric conditions.

Holdover times can be short, sometimes just a few minutes, so deicing of commercial passenger aircraft is usually done after the passengers are aboard and the aircraft is otherwise ready for departure. That way the aircraft can depart immediately after deicing is complete.

If an aircraft exceeds its holdover time, it must be deiced again. If an anti-icing fluid was used, that fluid will now be considered "failed" and must be removed before re-application. Anti-icing fluids must not be applied over a previous failed layer.

Because aircraft icing is such an important safety issue, most aviation authorities and commercial aircraft operators require detailed management plans and record keeping to ensure that the process is done in a safe, organized, timely, and repeatable fashion.

== Methods ==
=== Fluid-based ===
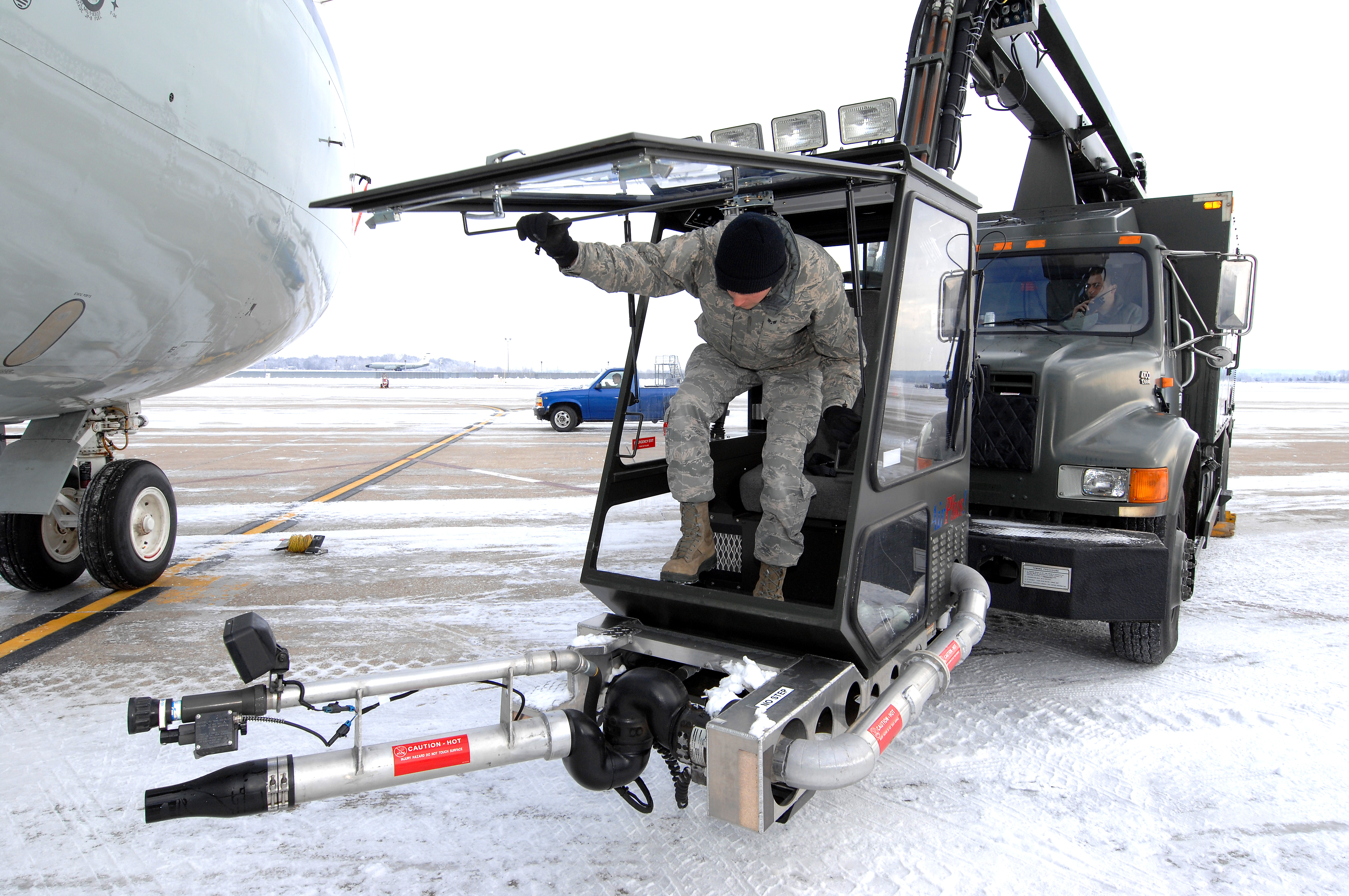
Fluid based aircraft de-icing vehicle

In most cases ground-based deicing is accomplished by spraying the aircraft with an aircraft deicing fluid just prior to departure. For commercial aircraft this fluid is usually applied to contaminated surfaces using a specially designed machine. For smaller aircraft a handheld spray applicator may suffice.

Deicing fluids are typically based on propylene glycol or ethylene glycol, which freeze at a lower temperature than water. There are several different types of fluid, falling into two basic categories:

1. Deicing fluids remove existing frozen contaminants. These are generally non-viscous, and may be heated.
2. Anti-icing fluids provide short term protection against recontamination. These are generally thickened fluids that remain on control surfaces until the aircraft is accelerating down the runway. They are generally applied cold.

In some cases both types of fluid are applied to aircraft, a process known as two-step deicing.

Glycol-based deicing fluids are toxic, and environmental concerns in the use of such fluids include increased salinity of groundwater, when de-icing fluids are discharged into soil, and toxicity to humans and other mammals. Thus, research into non-toxic alternative deicing fluids is ongoing.

=== Hot water ===
It may be possible to deice an aircraft using hot (60 °C or 140 °F) water if the ambient weather conditions are appropriate. Depending on circumstances this may be followed by an application of type I deicing fluid to prevent re-freezing.

=== Forced air ===
Forced air can be used to blow off accumulated snow provided precautions are taken to avoid damaging aircraft components.

If the outside air temperature is higher than freezing then unheated forced air can also be used for removing frost and ice, perhaps in conjunction with a subsequent application of deicing fluid.

Heated forced air is not generally used because it may result in the melted contamination refreezing on aircraft surfaces and/or damage to aircraft components.

The use of forced air for deicing is a maturing technology. Hybrid systems using heated air along with deicing fluids are currently being developed in an attempt to reduce the amount of fluids required.

=== Infrared heating ===
Direct infrared heating has also been developed as an aircraft deicing technique. This heat transfer mechanism is substantially faster than conventional heat transfer modes used by deicing fluids (convection and conduction) due to the cooling effect of the air on the deicing fluid spray.

One infrared deicing system requires that the heating process take place inside a specially constructed hangar. This system has had limited interest among airport operators, due to the space and related logistical requirements for the hangar. In the United States, this type of infrared deicing system has been used, on a limited basis, at two large hub airports and one small commercial airport.

Another infrared system uses mobile, truck-mounted heating units that do not require the use of hangars. The manufacturer claims that the system can be used for both fixed wing aircraft and helicopters, although it has not cited any instances of its use on commercial aircraft.

=== Mechanical ===
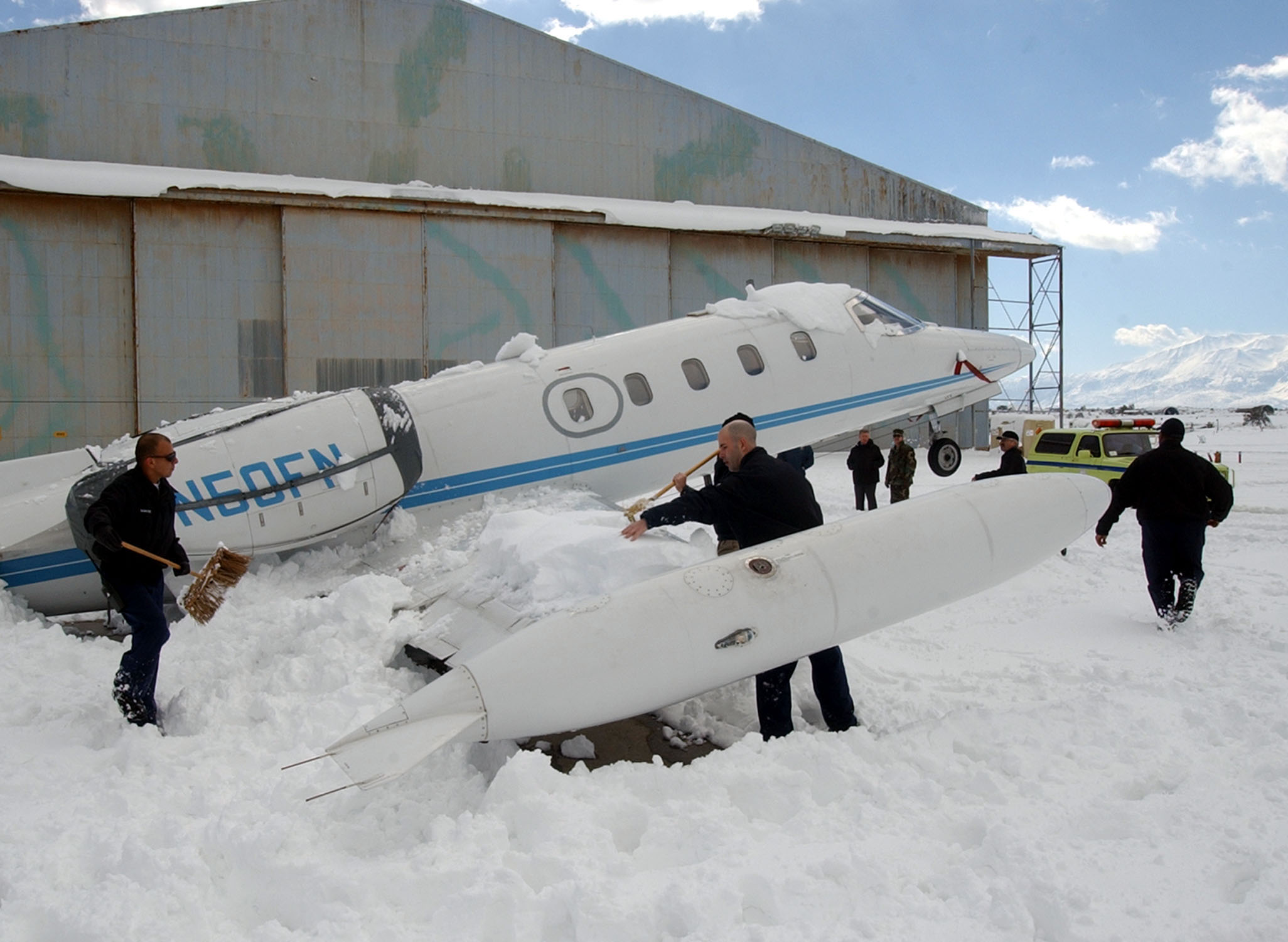
Mechanical removal of snow from a Learjet 35. The weight of snow on the tailplane has raised the nose into the air.

Mechanical deicing using tools such as brooms, scrapers, ropes, and mops can be used to minimize the amount of fluid or heat-based deicing required. However care must be taken to avoid damaging surfaces, antennas, pitot tubes, etc. Even a thin layer of frost can severely impact flight performance so mechanical methods do not usually suffice on their own. In extremely cold conditions however spray deicing may be impractical leaving mechanical deicing as the only possibility.

=== Hangar ===
Frozen contaminants on aircraft surfaces will eventually melt if the aircraft is placed in a warm hangar, but depending on the circumstances, frost or ice could form on surfaces once the aircraft is removed from the hangar and necessitate other types of deicing. In particular the difference in temperature of the fuel in wing tanks and the ambient air can cause frost to form.

=== Ice shedding ===
Typically fan-jet engines cannot be deiced with glycol based fluids, as doing so could cause damage to the engine itself or to its associated bleed air systems. Instead most aircraft manufacturers define an engine "ice shedding" procedure to be performed before takeoff, which involves spinning up the engine to a certain RPM for a specified period of time.

== Equipment ==
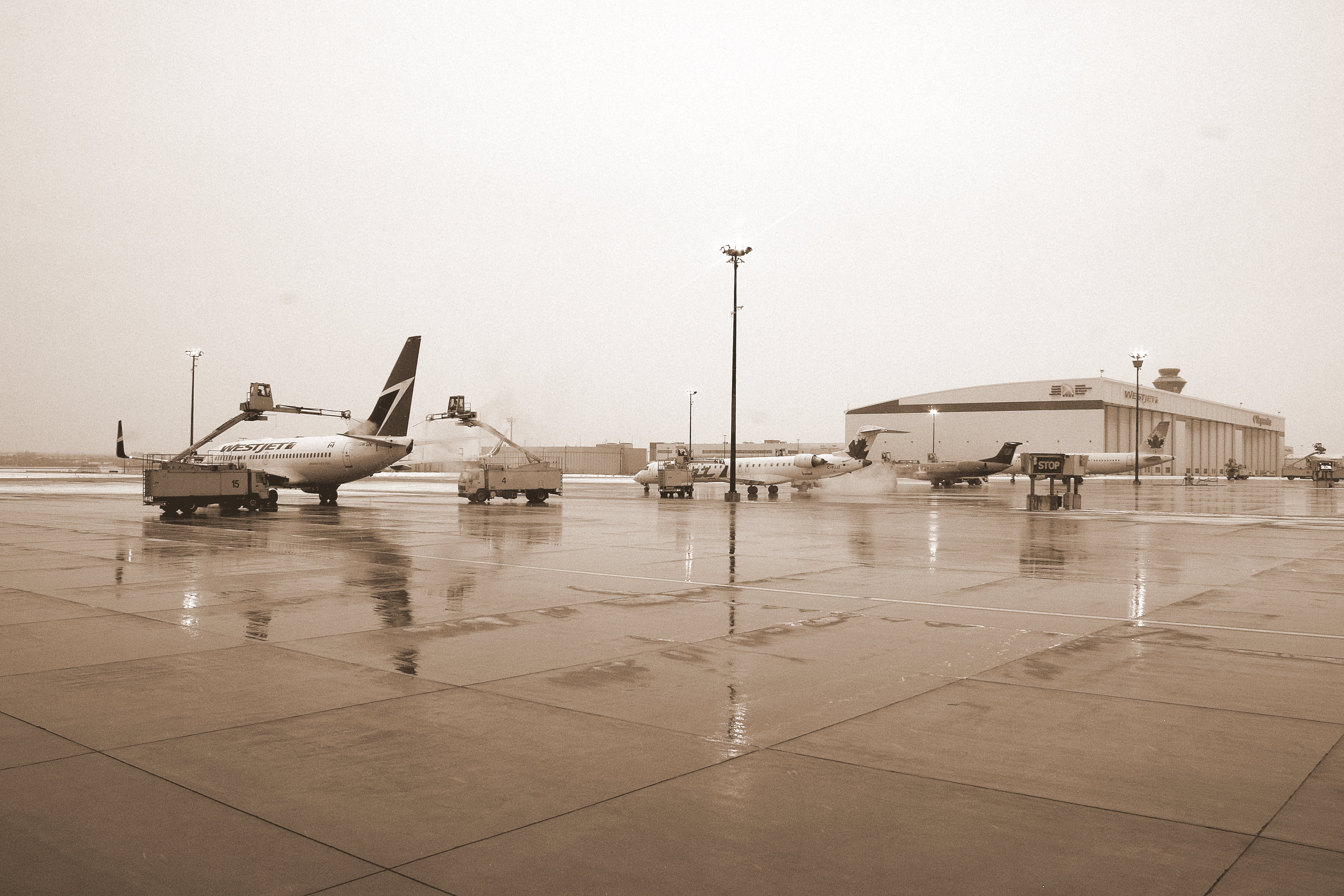
Deicing apron at Toronto Pearson International Airport in Canada

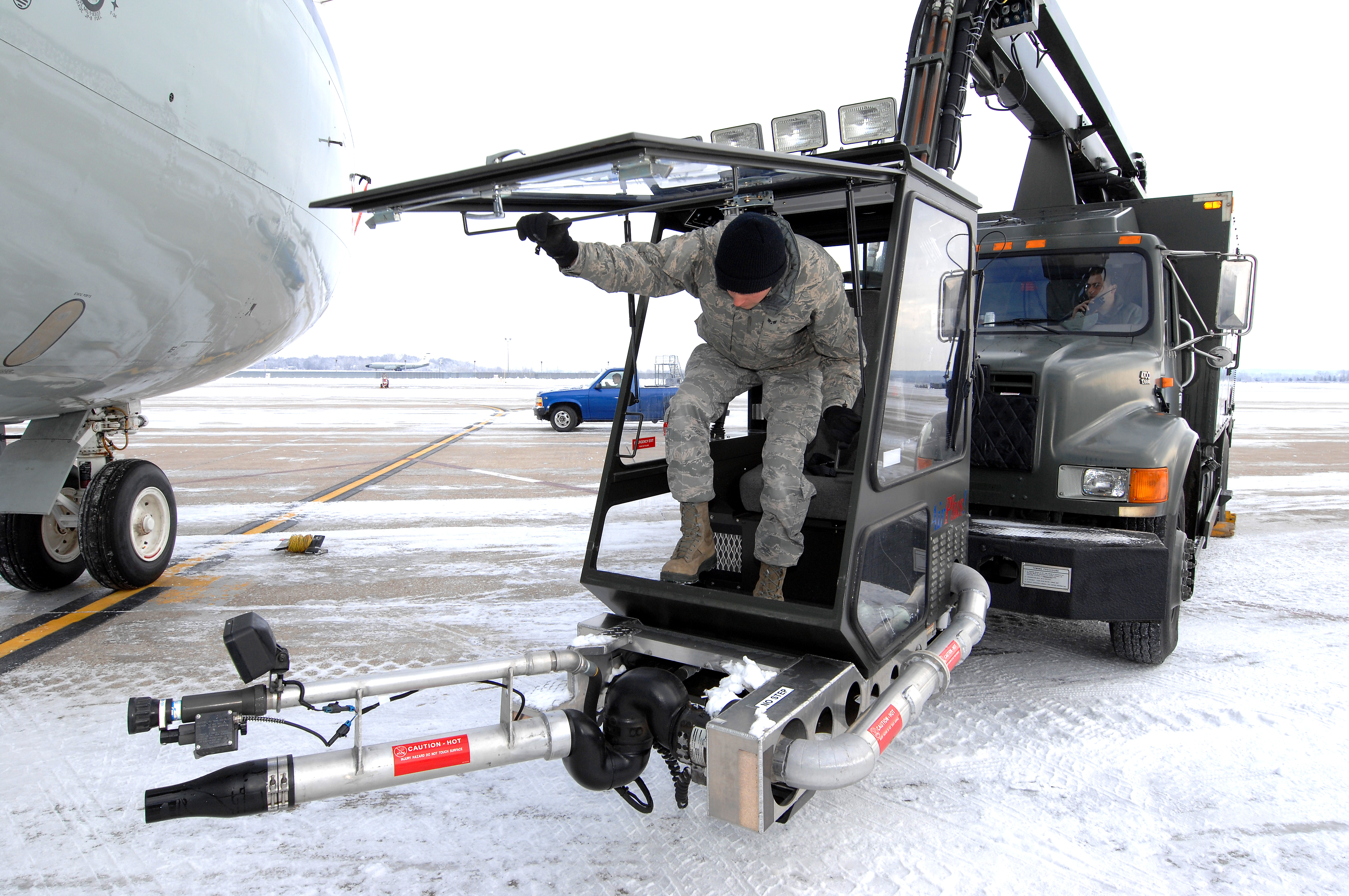
Deicer Truck at Offutt Air Force Base in Nebraska, United States

Commercial airports located in climates conducive to ground icing often have very elaborate deicing processes and equipment.

Typically deicing fluids are applied using a specialized vehicle similar to a "cherry picker" aerial work platform. These vehicles include tanks for fluids, a means to heat those fluids, and a system to deliver those heated fluids at high-pressure.

SAE International publishes standards and requirements for deicing vehicles, including: SAE ARP1971 (Aircraft Deicing Vehicle – Self-Propelled) and SAE ARP4806 (Deicing/Anti-Icing Self-Propelled Vehicle Functional Requirements).

Aircraft may be deiced in a hangar, at the arrival/departure gate, or on an airport apron dedicated to deicing. The advantage to the latter is that it facilitates collection of deicing fluid runoff for recycling.

Deicing can use a large quantity of fluids. Airports must have the appropriate storage and transportation facilities for these fluids.

== Environmental impacts and mitigation ==
=== Water pollution impacts ===
Ethylene glycol and propylene glycol exert high levels of biochemical oxygen demand during degradation in surface waters. This process can adversely affect aquatic life by consuming oxygen needed by aquatic organisms for survival. Large quantities of dissolved oxygen in the water column are consumed when microbial populations decompose propylene glycol.

Sufficient dissolved oxygen levels in surface waters are critical for the survival of fish, macroinvertebrates, and other aquatic organisms. If oxygen concentrations drop below a minimum level, organisms emigrate, if able and possible, to areas with higher oxygen levels, or eventually die. This effect can drastically reduce the amount of usable aquatic habitat. Reductions in dissolved oxygen levels can reduce or eliminate bottom feeder populations, create conditions that favor a change in a community's species profile, or alter critical food-web interactions.

=== Mitigation ===
Aircraft deicing can use a considerable amount of deicing fluids, generally hundreds of gallons per aircraft. Some airports recycle used deicing fluid, separating water and solid contaminants, enabling reuse of the fluid in other applications. Other airports have an on-site wastewater treatment facility, or send collected fluid to a municipal sewage treatment plant or a commercial wastewater treatment facility.

== See also ==
- Airliner accidents and incidents caused by ice
