= Alkylphenol =

Family of organic compounds

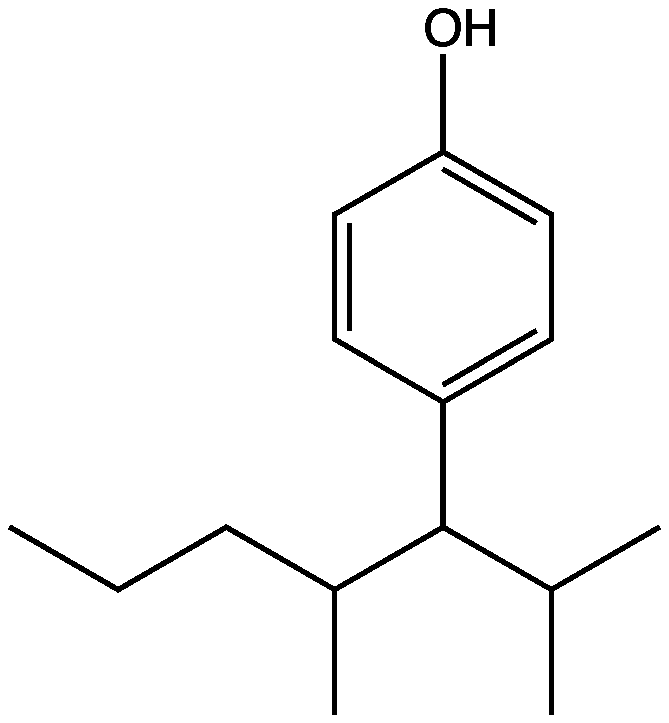
Chemical structure of the alkylphenol nonylphenol

Alkylphenols are a family of organic compounds obtained by the alkylation of phenols. The term is usually reserved for commercially important propylphenol, butylphenol, amylphenol, heptylphenol, octylphenol, nonylphenol, dodecylphenol and related "long chain alkylphenols" (LCAPs). Methylphenols and ethylphenols are also alkylphenols, but they are more commonly referred to by their specific names, cresols and xylenols. Some members of this group of compounds have proven controversial.

== Production and use ==
The long-chain alkylphenols are prepared by alkylation of phenol with alkenes:

C_{6}H_{5}OH + RR'C=CH2 → RR'CH−CH_{2}−C_{6}H_{4}OH

In this way, about 500M kg/y are produced. Alkylphenols ethoxylates are common surfactants. Long-chain alkylphenols are used extensively as precursors to detergents. By condensation with formaldehyde, some alkylphenols are components in phenolic resins. These compounds are also used as building-block chemicals in making fragrances, thermoplastic elastomers, antioxidants, oil field chemicals, and fire retardant materials. As plastizers and antioxidants, alkylphenols are also found in tires, adhesives, coatings, carbonless copy paper and high performance rubber products.

== Environmental controversy over nonylphenols ==
Alkylphenols are xenoestrogens. Long chain Alkylphenols have the most potent estrogenic activity. The European Union has implemented sales and use restrictions on certain applications in which nonylphenols are used because of their "toxicity, persistence, and the liability to bioaccumulate" but the United States EPA has taken a slower approach. In order to restrict chemicals in the United States, the Environmental Protection Agency (EPA)needs to prove that those chemicals are unreasonably harmful. This has yet to be the case with Alkylphenols, upon which there is still research being done to prove their harmful effects.
