= Nonene =

Alkene

Nonene is an alkene with the molecular formula C_{9}H_{18}. Many structural isomers are possible, depending on the location of the C=C double bond and the branching of the other parts of the molecule. Industrially, the most important nonenes are trimers of propene: Tripropylene. This mixture of branched nonenes is used in the alkylation of phenol to produce nonylphenol, a precursor to detergents, which are also controversial pollutants.

== Linear nonenes ==
Linear Nonene
Name	1-Nonene	2-Nonene	3-Nonene	4-Nonene
Systematic name	Non-1-ene	Non-2-ene	Non-3-ene	Non-4-ene
Structure				
CAS Number	124-11-8	2216-38-8; 6434-77-1 (cis); 6434-78-2 (trans)	125146-82-9; 20237-46-1 (cis); 20063-77-8 (trans)	2198-23-4; 10405-84-2 (cis); 10405-85-3 (trans)
CAS Number	27215-95-8 (all isomers)			
PubChem	CID 31285 from PubChem	CID 33744 from PubChem	CID 88350 from PubChem	CID 94226 from PubChem
Chemical formula	C_{9}H_{18}			
Molecular weight	126.24 g·mol^{−1}			
Melting point	−81 °C			
Boiling point	147 °C	144–145 °C		147 °C
Density	0,73 g·cm^{−3} (20 °C)	0,734 g·cm^{−3} (25 °C)	0,734 g·cm^{−3} (25 °C)	0,73 g·cm^{−3}
GHS hazard pictograms	(GHS02: Flammable) (GHS08: Health hazard) (GHS07: Exclamation mark)	(GHS02: Flammable)	(GHS02: Flammable)	(GHS02: Flammable) (GHS08: Health hazard)
GHS hazard statements	H226, H304, H315, H319, H335	H226	H226	H226, H304
GHS hazard statements	P261, P301+P310, P305+P351+P338, P331			P210, P233, P240, P241, P242, P243, P280, P301, P310; P303+P361+P353, P331, P370+P378, P403+P235, P405, P501
