= Tripropylene =

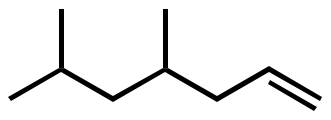

Identifiers
CAS Number	13987-01-4; 4,6-Dimethyl-1-heptene:: 7379-69-3
3D model (JSmol)	4,6-Dimethyl-1-heptene:: Interactive image
ChemSpider	4,6-Dimethyl-1-heptene:: 10618997
PubChem CID	4,6-Dimethyl-1-heptene:: 13437467
UN number	2057
CompTox Dashboard (EPA)	DTXSID50540820
- InChI: 4,6-Dimethyl-1-heptene:: InChI=1S/C9H18/c1-5-6-9(4)7-8(2)3/h5,8-9H,1,6-7H2,2-4H3 Key: FSWNZCWHTXTQBY-UHFFFAOYSA-N
- SMILES: 4,6-Dimethyl-1-heptene:: CC(C)CC(C)CC=C

Properties
Chemical formula	C_{9}H_{18}
Molar mass	126.24 g/mol
Appearance	colourless liquid
Density	1.022 g/mL
Melting point	−93.5 °C (−136.3 °F; 179.7 K)
Boiling point	156 °C (313 °F; 429 K)
Solubility in water	very low

Hazards
Flash point	23 °C (73 °F; 296 K)
- Except where otherwise noted, data are given for materials in their standard state (at 25 °C [77 °F], 100 kPa). verify (what is ?) Infobox references

Tripropylene, also known as propylene trimer, is usually sold as a mixture of structural isomers of nonene. This mixture is obtained by oligomerization of propene:

3 C_{3}H_{6} → C_{9}H_{18}

In this process, two double bonds are lost and one is retained as illustrated by the isomer shown in the figure. The reaction is catalyzed by acids, such as polyphosphoric acid. A variety of catalysts have been explored. The reaction proceeds via the formation of a carbocation ((CH_{3})_{2}CH^{+}), which attacks another propylene unit, generating a new carbocation, etc. This kind of process affords mixtures (C_{3}H_{6})_{n}.

Like other alkenes, propylene trimer is used as an alkylating agent. A number of surfactants and lubricants are produced by alkylation of aromatic substrates.

== See also ==
- 1-Nonene - the linear analogue
