= Β-Santalol =

Chemical compound

β-Santalol

Names
- Preferred IUPAC name (2Z)-2-Methyl-5-[(1S,2R,4R)-2-methyl-3-methylidenebicyclo[2.2.1]heptan-2-yl]pent-2-en-1-ol

Identifiers
CAS Number	77-42-9
3D model (JSmol)	Interactive image
ChEBI	CHEBI:10441
ChEMBL	ChEMBL3586094
ChemSpider	16736012
ECHA InfoCard	100.000.935
EC Number	201-027-2
KEGG	C09720
PubChem CID	6857681
UNII	1JL7K2LW6L
CompTox Dashboard (EPA)	DTXSID70892297 DTXSID1051567, DTXSID70892297
- InChI: InChI=1S/C15H24O/c1-11(10-16)5-4-8-15(3)12(2)13-6-7-14(15)9-13/h5,13-14,16H,2,4,6-10H2,1,3H3/b11-5-/t13-,14+,15+/m1/s1 Key: OJYKYCDSGQGTRJ-GQYWAMEOSA-N
- SMILES: C/C(CO)=C\CCC2(C)C(=C)C1CC2CC1

Properties
Chemical formula	C_{15}H_{24}O
Molar mass	220.356 g·mol^{−1}
Appearance	Liquid
Density	0.9717 g/cm^{3}
Boiling point	177 °C (351 °F; 450 K)
Solubility in water	Practically insoluble
Solubility in ethanol	Soluble
Solubility in diethyl ether	Soluble
Chiral rotation ([α]_{D})	−87.1°
Refractive index (n_{D})	1.5100

Hazards
- GHS labelling
Pictograms	(GHS07: Exclamation mark)
Signal word	Warning
Hazard statements	H317
Precautionary statements	P261, P272, P280, P302+P352, P321, P333+P313, P363, P501

Related compounds
Related terpenes	α-Santalol
- Except where otherwise noted, data are given for materials in their standard state (at 25 °C [77 °F], 100 kPa). Infobox references

β-Santalol is an organic compound that is classified as a sesquiterpene. It comprises about 20% of the oil of sandalwood, the major component being α-santalol. In 2002, about 60 tons of sandalwood oil were produced by steam distillation of the heartwood of Santalum album. It is used in perfumery as a fixative, woody modifier and dominant (central accord).

Because of concerns about the sustainability of sandalwood tree cultivation, scientists have developed routes to α-santalol and β-santalol via fermentation, including using Rhodobacter sphaeroides. BASF launched its version under their Isobionics brand in July 2020.
