= Nonylphenol =

- Representative structure

Names
- IUPAC name 4-(2,4-dimethylheptan-3-yl)phenol
- Other names Phenol, nonyl-

Identifiers
CAS Number	25154-52-3 (general class); 104-40-5 (4-n-Nonyl phenol); 84852-15-3 (branched 4-Nonyl phenols); 11066-49-2 (isononylphenols)
3D model (JSmol)	Interactive image
ChEMBL	ChEMBL153062
ChemSpider	60628
PubChem CID	67296
UNII	79F6A2ILP5 (general class); I03GBV4WEL (4-n-Nonyl phenol); JRW3Q994VG (branched 4-Nonyl phenols)
- InChI: InChI=1S/C15H24O/c1-2-3-4-5-6-7-8-11-14-12-9-10-13-15(14)16/h9-10,12-13,16H,2-8,11H2,1H3 Key: SNQQPOLDUKLAAF-UHFFFAOYSA-N; InChI=1/C15H24O/c1-2-3-4-5-6-7-8-11-14-12-9-10-13-15(14)16/h9-10,12-13,16H,2-8,11H2,1H3 Key: SNQQPOLDUKLAAF-UHFFFAOYAP
- SMILES: Oc1ccccc1CCCCCCCCC

Properties
Chemical formula	C_{15}H_{24}O
Molar mass	220.35 g/mol
Appearance	Light yellow viscous liquid with phenolic smell
Density	0.953
Melting point	−8 to 2 °C (18 to 36 °F; 265 to 275 K)
Boiling point	293 to 297 °C (559 to 567 °F; 566 to 570 K)
Solubility in water	6 mg/L (pH 7)

Hazards
- Occupational safety and health (OHS/OSH)
Main hazards	low level endrocrine disruptor
- Except where otherwise noted, data are given for materials in their standard state (at 25 °C [77 °F], 100 kPa). verify (what is ?) Infobox references

Nonylphenols are a family of closely related organic compounds composed of phenol bearing a 9 carbon-tail. Nonylphenols can come in numerous structures, all of which may be considered alkylphenols. They are used in manufacturing antioxidants, lubricating oil additives, laundry and dish detergents, emulsifiers, and solubilizers. They are used extensively in epoxy formulation in North America but its use has been phased out in Europe. These compounds are also precursors to the commercially important non-ionic surfactants nonylphenol ethoxylates (a subgroup of the alkylphenol ethoxylates), which are used in detergents, paints, pesticides, personal care products, and plastics. Nonylphenol has attracted attention due to its prevalence in the environment and its potential role as an endocrine disruptor and xenoestrogen, due to its ability to act with estrogen-like activity. The estrogenicity and biodegradation heavily depends on the branching of the nonyl sidechain. Nonylphenol has been found to act as an agonist of the GPER (GPR30).

== Structure and basic properties ==
Nonylphenols fall into the general chemical category of alkylphenols. The structure of NPs may vary. The nonyl group can be attached to the phenol ring at various locations, usually the 4- and, to lesser extent, the 2-positions, and can be either branched or linear. A branched nonylphenol, 4-nonylphenol, is the most widely produced and marketed nonylphenol. The mixture of nonylphenol isomers is a pale yellow liquid, although the pure compounds are colorless. The nonylphenols are moderately soluble in water but soluble in alcohol.

Nonylphenol arises from the environmental degradation of nonylphenol ethoxylates, which are the metabolites of commercial detergents called alkylphenol ethoxylates. NPEs are a clear to light orange color liquid. Nonylphenol ethoxylates are nonionic in water, which means that they have no charge. Because of this property they are used as detergents, cleaners, emulsifiers, and a variety of other applications. They are amphipathic, meaning they have both hydrophilic and hydrophobic properties, which allows them to surround non-polar substances like oil and grease, isolating them from water.

== Production ==
Nonylphenol can be produced industrially and by the environmental degradation of alkylphenol ethoxylates. Industrially, nonylphenols are produced by the acid-catalyzed alkylation of phenol with a mixture of nonenes. This synthesis leads to a very complex mixture with diverse nonylphenols. Theoretically there are 211 constitutional isomers and this number rises to 550 isomers if we take the enantiomers into account. To make NPEs, manufacturers treat NP with ethylene oxide under basic conditions. Since its discovery in 1940, nonylphenol production has increased exponentially, and between 100 and 500 million pounds of nonylphenol are produced globally every year, meeting the definition of High Production Volume Chemicals.

Nonylphenols are also produced naturally in the environment. One organism, the velvet worm, produces nonylphenol as a component of its defensive slime. The nonylphenol coats the ejection channel of the slime, stopping it from sticking to the organism when it is secreted. It also prolongs the drying process long enough for the slime to reach its target.

Another surfactant called nonoxynol, which was once used as intravaginal spermicide and condom lubricant, was found to metabolize into free nonylphenol when administered to lab animals.

== Applications ==
Nonylphenol is used in manufacturing antioxidants, lubricating oil additives, laundry and dish detergents, emulsifiers, and solubilizers. It can also be used to produce tris(4-nonyl-phenyl) phosphite (TNPP), which is an antioxidant used to protect polymers, such as rubber, Vinyl polymers, polyolefins, and polystyrenics in addition to being a stabilizer in plastic food packaging. Barium and calcium salts of nonylphenol are also used as heat stabilizers for polyvinyl chloride (PVC). Nonylphenol is also often used an intermediate in the manufacture of the non-ionic surfactants nonylphenol ethoxylates, which are used in detergents, paints, pesticides, personal care products, and plastics. Nonylphenol and nonylphenol ethoxylates are only used as components of household detergents outside of Europe. Nonyl Phenol, is used in many epoxy formulations mainly in North America.

== Prevalence in the environment ==
Nonylphenol persists in aquatic environments and is moderately bioaccumulative. It is not readily biodegradable, and it can take months or longer to degrade in surface waters, soils, and sediments. Nonbiological degradation is negligible. Nonylphenol is partially removed during municipal wastewater treatment due to sorption to suspended solids and biotransformation. Many products that contain nonylphenol have "down-the-drain" applications, such as laundry and dish soap, so the contaminants are frequently introduced into the water supply. In sewage treatment plants, nonylphenol ethoxylate degrades into nonylphenol, which is found in river water and sediments as well as soil and groundwater. Nonylphenol photodegrades in sunlight, but its half-life in sediment is estimated to be more than 60 years. Although the concentration of nonylphenol in the environment is decreasing, it is still found at concentrations of 4.1 μg/L in river waters and 1 mg/kg in sediments.

A major concern is that contaminated sewage sludge is frequently recycled onto agricultural land. The degradation of nonylphenol in soil depends on oxygen availability and other components in the soil. Mobility of nonylphenol in soil is low.

Bioaccumulation is significant in water-dwelling organisms and birds, and nonylphenol has been found in internal organs of certain animals at concentrations of 10 to 1,000 times greater than the surrounding environment. Due to this bioaccumulation and persistence of nonylphenol, it has been suggested that nonylphenol could be transported over long distances and have a global reach that stretches far from the site of contamination.

Nonylphenol is not persistent in air, as it is rapidly degraded by hydroxyl radicals.

=== Environmental hazards ===
Nonylphenol is considered to be an endocrine disruptor due to its ability to mimic estrogen and in turn disrupt the natural balance of hormones in affected organisms. The effect is weak because nonylphenols are not very close structural mimics of estradiol, but the levels of nonylphenol can be sufficiently high to compensate.

Structure of the hormone estradiol and one of the nonylphenols.

The effects of nonylphenol in the environment are most applicable to aquatic species. Nonylphenol can cause endocrine disruption in fish by interacting with estrogen receptors and androgen receptors. Studies report that nonylphenol competitively displaces estrogen from its receptor site in rainbow trout. It has much less affinity for the estrogen receptor than estrogen in trout (5 × 10^{−5} relative binding affinity compared to estradiol) making it 100,000 times less potent than estradiol. Nonylphenol causes the feminization of aquatic organisms, decreases male fertility, and decreases survival in young fish. Studies show that male fish exposed to nonylphenol have lower testicular weight. Nonylphenol can disrupt steroidogenesis in the liver. One function of endogenous estrogen in fish is to stimulate the liver to make vitellogenin, which is a phospholipoprotein. Vitellogenin is released by the maturing female and sequestered by developing oocytes to produce the egg yolk. Males do not normally produce vitellogenin, but when exposed to nonylphenol they produce similar levels of vitellogenin to females. The concentration needed to induce vitellogenin production in fish is 10 ug/L for NP in water. Nonylphenol can also interfere with the level of FSH (follicle-stimulating hormone) being released from the pituitary gland. Concentrations of NP that inhibit reproductive development and function in fish also damages kidneys, decreases body weight, and induces stressed behavior.

== Human health hazards ==
Alkylphenols like nonylphenol and bisphenol A have estrogenic effects in the body. They are known as xenoestrogens. Estrogenic substances and other endocrine disruptors are compounds that have hormone-like effects in both wildlife and humans. Xenoestrogens usually function by binding to estrogen receptors and acting competitively against natural estrogens. Nonylphenol has been shown to mimic the natural hormone 17β-estradiol, and it competes with the endogenous hormone for binding with the estrogen receptors ERα and ERβ. Nonylphenol was discovered to have hormone-like effects by accident because it contaminated other experiments in laboratories that were studying natural estrogens that were using polystyrene tubes.

=== Effects in pregnant women ===
Subcutaneous injections of nonylphenol in late pregnancy causes the expression of certain placental and uterine proteins, namely CaBP-9k, which suggest it can be transferred through the placenta to the fetus. It has also been shown to have a higher potency on the first trimester placenta than the endogenous estrogen 17β-estradiol. In addition, early prenatal exposure to low doses of nonylphenol cause an increase in apoptosis (programmed cell death) in placental cells. These “low doses” ranged from 10^{−13}-10^{−9} M, which is lower than what is generally found in the environment.

Nonylphenol has also been shown to affect cytokine signaling molecule secretions in the human placenta. In vitro cell cultures of human placenta during the first trimester were treated with nonylphenol, which increase the secretion of cytokines including interferon gamma, interleukin 4, and interleukin 10, and reduced the secretion of tumor necrosis factor alpha. This unbalanced cytokine profile at this part of pregnancy has been documented to result in implantation failure, pregnancy loss, and other complications.

=== Effects on metabolism ===
Nonylphenol has been shown to act as an obesity enhancing chemical or obesogen, though it has paradoxically been shown to have anti-obesity properties. Growing embryos and newborns are particularly vulnerable when exposed to nonylphenol because low-doses can disrupt sensitive processes that occur during these important developmental periods. Prenatal and perinatal exposure to nonylphenol has been linked with developmental abnormalities in adipose tissue and therefore in metabolic hormone synthesis and release (Merrill 2011). Specifically, by acting as an estrogen mimic, nonylphenol has generally been shown to interfere with hypothalamic appetite control. The hypothalamus responds to the hormone leptin, which signals the feeling of fullness after eating, and nonylphenol has been shown to both increase and decrease eating behavior by interfering with leptin signaling in the midbrain. Nonylphenol has been shown mimic the action of leptin on neuropeptide Y and anorectic POMC neurons, which has an anti-obesity effect by decreasing eating behavior. This was seen when estrogen or estrogen mimics were injected into the ventromedial hypothalamus. On the other hand, nonylphenol has been shown to increase food intake and have obesity enhancing properties by lowering the expression of these anorexigenic neurons in the brain. Additionally, nonylphenol affects the expression of ghrelin: an enzyme produced by the stomach that stimulates appetite. Ghrelin expression is positively regulated by estrogen signaling in the stomach, and it is also important in guiding the differentiation of stem cells into adipocytes (fat cells). Thus, acting as an estrogen mimic, prenatal and perinatal exposure to nonylphenol has been shown to increase appetite and encourage the body to store fat later in life. Finally, long-term exposure to nonylphenol has been shown to affect insulin signaling in the liver of adult male rats.

=== Cancer ===
Nonylphenol exposure has also been associated with breast cancer. It has been shown to promote the proliferation of breast cancer cells, due to its agonistic activity on ERα (estrogen receptor α) in estrogen-dependent and estrogen-independent breast cancer cells. Some argue that nonylphenol's suggested estrogenic effect coupled with its widespread human exposure could potentially influence hormone-dependent breast cancer disease.

=== Human exposure and breakdown ===
==== Exposure ====
Diet seems the most significant source of exposure of nonylphenol to humans. For example, food samples were found with concentrations ranging from 0.1 to 19.4 μg/kg in a diet survey in Germany and a daily intake for an adult were calculated to be 7.5 μg/day. Another study calculated a daily intake for the more exposed group of infants in the range of 0.23-0.65 μg per kg bodyweight per day. In Taiwan, nonylphenol concentrations in food ranged from 5.8 to 235.8 μg/kg. Seafood in particular was found to have a high concentration of nonylphenol.

One study conducted in Italian women showed that nonylphenol was one of the highest contaminants at a concentration of 32 ng/mL in breast milk when compared to other alkyl phenols, such as octylphenol, nonylphenol monoethoxylate, and two octylphenol ethoxylates. The study also found a positive correlation between fish consumption and the concentration of nonylphenol in breast milk. This is a large problem because breast milk is the main source of nourishment for newborns, who are in early stages of development where hormones are very influential. Elevated levels of endocrine disruptors in breast milk have been associated with negative effects on neurological development, growth, and memory function.

Drinking water does not represent a significant source of exposure in comparison to other sources such as food packing materials, cleaning products, and various skin care products. Concentrations of nonylphenol in treated drinking water varied from 85 ng/L in Spain to 15 ng/L in Germany.

Microgram amounts of nonylphenol have also been found in the saliva of patients with dental sealants.

==== Breakdown ====
When humans orally ingest nonylphenol, it is rapidly absorbed in the gastrointestinal tract. The metabolic pathways involved in its degradation are thought to involve glucuronide and sulfate conjugation, and the metabolites are then concentrated in fat. There is inconsistent data on bioaccumulation in humans, but nonylphenol has been shown to bioaccumulate in water-dwelling animals and birds. Nonylphenol is excreted in feces and in urine.

== Analytics ==
There are standard GC-MS and HPLC protocols for the detection of nonylphenols within environmental sample matrices such as foodstuffs, drinking water and biological tissue. Industrially produced nonylphenol (the source most likely to be found in the environment) contains a mixture of structural isomers, and while these protocols are able to detect this mixture, they are typically unable to resolve the individual nonylphenol isomers within it. However, a methodological study has indicated that better isomeric resolution can be achieved in bulk nonylphenol samples using a GC-MS/MS (tandem mass-analyzer) system, suggesting that this technique could also improve the resolution of nonylphenol isomers in environmental sample analyses; further improvements in the resolution of nonylphenol isomers have been achieved through the use of two-dimensional GC at the separation stage, as part of a GC × GC-TOF-MS system.

In contrast to environmental sample analyses, synthetic studies of nonylphenols have more control over sample state, concentration and preparation, simplifying the use of powerful structural identification techniques like NMR - capable of identifying the individual nonylphenol isomers. In a preliminary investigation of the relationship between nonylphenol sidechain branching patterns and estrogenic potential, the authors identified 211 possible structural isomers of p-nonylphenol alone, which expanded to 550 possible p-nonylphenol compounds when taking chiral C-atoms into consideration. Because stereochemical factors are thought to contribute to the biological activity of nonylphenols, analytical techniques sensitive to chirality, such as enantioselective HPLC and certain NMR protocols, are desirable in order to further study these relationships.

== Regulation ==
The production and use of nonylphenol and nonylphenol ethoxylates is prohibited for certain situations in the European Union due to its effects on health and the environment. In Europe, due to environmental concerns, they also have been replaced by more expensive alcohol ethoxylates, which are less problematic for the environment due to their ability to degrade more quickly than nonylphenols. The European Union has also included NP on the list of priority hazardous substances for surface water in the Water Framework Directive. They are now implementing a drastic reduction policy of NP's in surface waterways. The Environmental quality standard for NP was proposed to be 0.3 ug/L. In 2013 nonylphenols were registered on the REACH candidate list.

In the US, the EPA set criteria which recommends that nonylphenol concentration should not exceed 6.6 ug/L in fresh water and 1.7 ug/L in saltwater. In order to do so, the EPA is supporting and encouraging a voluntary phase-out of nonylphenol in industrial laundry detergents. Similarly, the EPA is documenting proposals for a "significant new use" rule, which would require companies to contact the EPA if they decided to add nonylphenol to any new cleaning and detergent products. They also plan to do more risk assessments to ascertain the effects of nonylphenol on human health and the environment.

In other Asian and South American countries nonylphenol is still widely available in commercial detergents, and there is little regulation.

=== Japan ===
Japan has increased regulation of Nonylphenol. The increase of the regulation of Nonylphenol has caused other countries to regulate the chemical, restricting its public use in consumable products. Japan’s monitoring and classification of Nonylphenol’s water contamination is ahead of other countries, where the use of Nonylphenol is rife and regulation is limited.
