= List of Fokker F28 operators =

The following is a list of past and present operators of the Fokker F28 including Fokker F28-0070 (Fokker 70) and Fokker F28-0100 (Fokker 100).

By 2019, no Fokker F28 aircraft remained in civil service (LADE mentioned below is organizationally part of the Argentine Air Force). Fly-SAX was the last airline operator of the F28 worldwide with the last aircraft in service stored in September 2019 due to lack of flight crew.

In late 2025, the World Air Forces publication by FlightGlobal, which tracks the aircraft inventories of world's air forces and publishes its counts annually, published the World Air Forces 2026 report. According to that report, there were no F28 aircraft in service in any air force (or other military unit) of the world. The World Air Forces 2026 report does not however list the aircraft of the LADE, and indeed Argentina, through LADE, is the last operator of F28 Fellowship aircraft.

The last 2 F28 aircraft in service (as of 2025) are operated by Argentina's LADE, an Argentinian governmental airline that is part of the Argentine Air Force (and thus variously classified as civilian or military or governmental or all of the above).

== Civil operators ==
Many of these air carriers formerly operated Fokker F28 aircraft. Fokker 70 and Fokker 100 former operators when known are included as well.

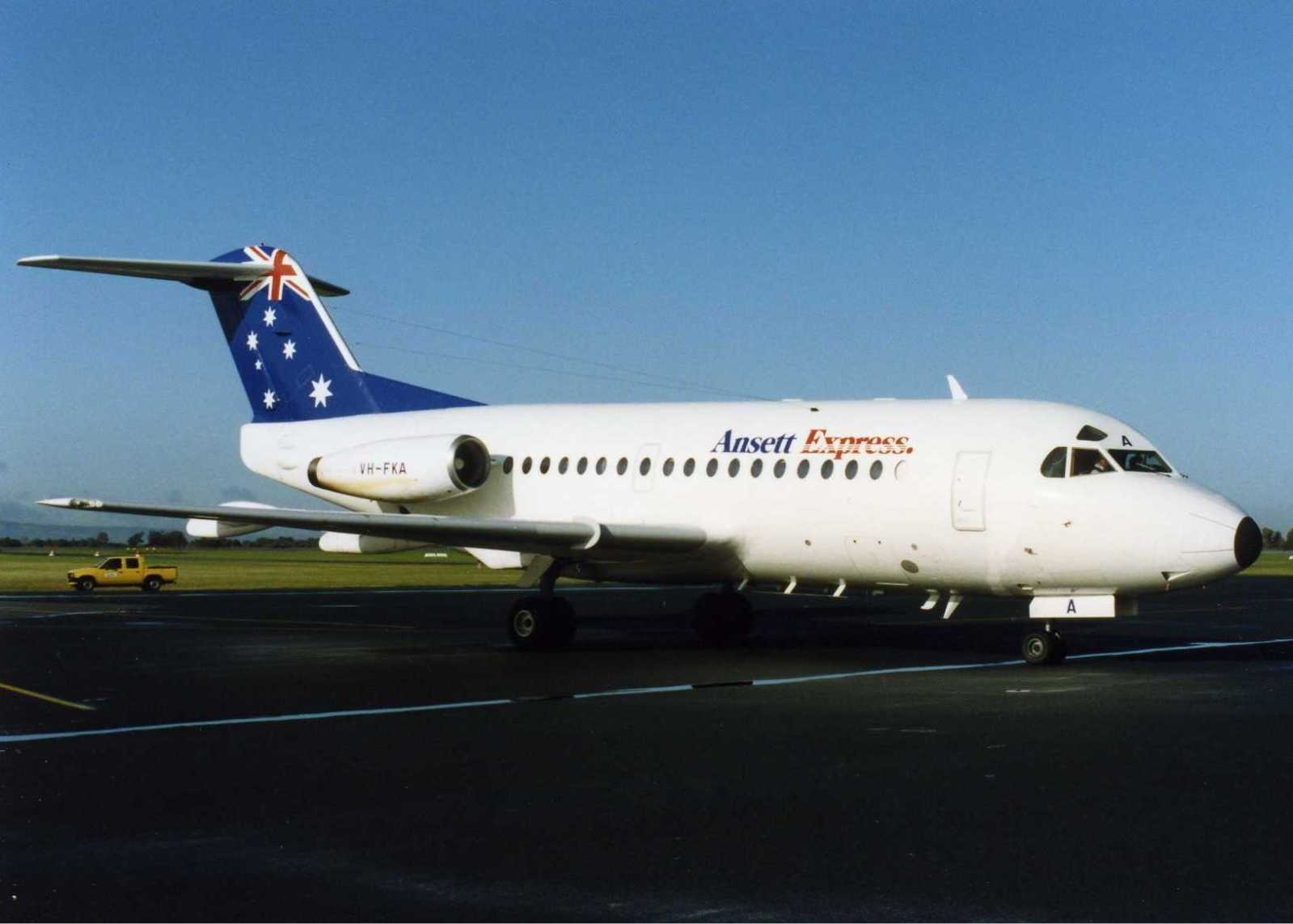
Ansett Express F28 at Perth Airport in the early 1990s

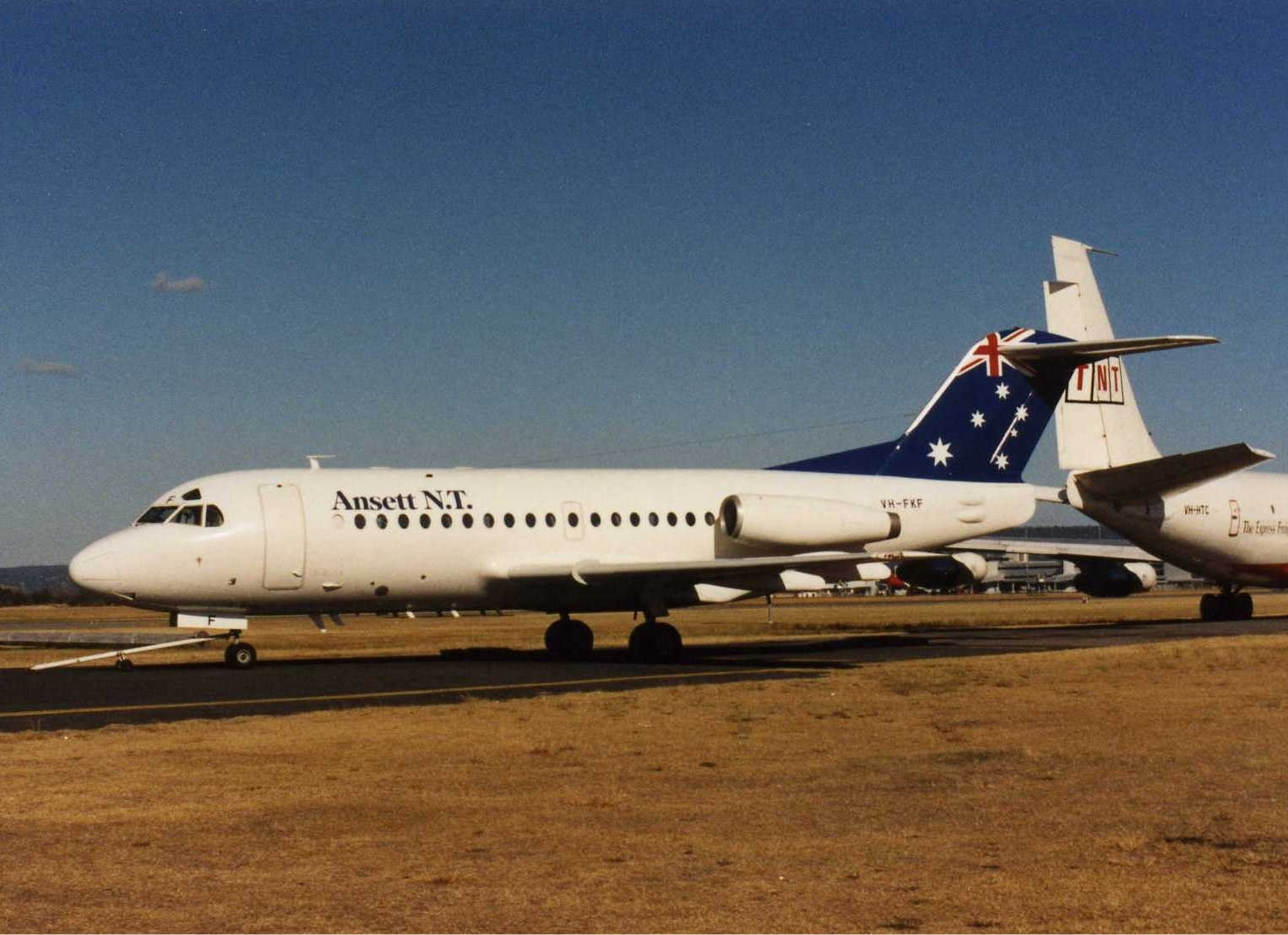
Ansett NT F28 at Perth Airport in the early 1990s.

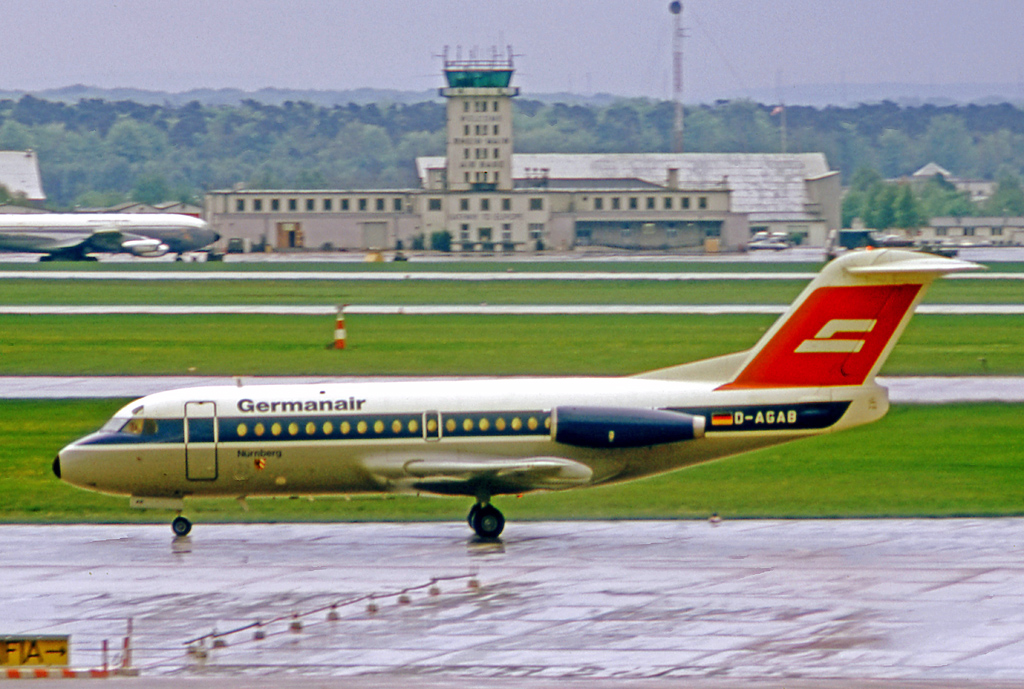
Germanair Fokker F28 at Frankfurt Airport in 1973

Argentina
Aerolíneas Argentinas
American Falcon
Dinar Líneas Aéreas
LAER - Líneas Aéreas de Entre Rios
Australia
Airlines of New South Wales
Ansett
Ansett Express
Ansett NT
Ansett W.A.
East-West Airlines
Flight West
MacRobertson Miller Airlines
Bangladesh
Biman Bangladesh Airlines
Canada
Air Canada (F28 aircraft operated by regional airline code sharing affiliates including Air Ontario flying Air Canada Connector service)
Air Niagara
Air Ontario (operated Air Canada Connector F28 service on behalf of Air Canada)
Atlantic Island Airways
Canadian North (operated Fokker 100 and F28 aircraft)
Canadian Regional Airlines
Husby Forest Products (corporate operator)
Intair (Fokker 100 operator)
Inter-Canadien (operated Fokker 100 and F28 aircraft)
Jetsgo (Fokker 100 operator)
Norcanair
Peregrine Air Charter
Quebecair
Time Air (largest F28 operator in Canada flying Canadian Partner service and later Canadian Regional Airlines service on behalf of Canadian Airlines International)
Transair
Colombia
ACES Colombia
Satena
Denmark
Cimber Air
Scandinavian Airlines
Ecuador
Icaro Air
TAME
Finland
Air Botnia
Blue1 (former operator)
Gabon
Air Gabon
Germany
Aviaction
Bavaria Germanair (Germanair in 1972-1976)
LTU
Ghana
Ghana Airways
Guatemala
Aviateca
Indonesia
Garuda Indonesia (largest user with 62 F28 aircraft in the fleet)
Kal Star Aviation
Merpati Nusantara Airlines
Pelita Air Service
Italy
Itavia
Unifly
Ivory Coast
Air Ivoire
Jordan
Royal Jordanian
Mexico
Aviacsa (Fokker 100 operator)
Click Mexicana (Fokker 100 operator, Mexicana Airlines subsidiary)
Mexicana Airlines (Fokker 100 operator)
Montenegro
Montenegro Airlines
Myanmar
Myanma Airways
Netherlands
KLM Cityhopper (Fokker 70 and Fokker 100 operator, KLM Royal Dutch Airlines subsidiary)
Martinair
NLM CityHopper
Nigeria
Nigeria Airways
North Macedonia
Palair
Norway
Braathens (Braathens S.A.F.E)
Scandinavian Airlines
Nauru
Air Nauru
Papua New Guinea
Air Niugini
Peru
Aeroperú
TANS Perú (crashed as TANS Perú Flight 222 in 2003)
South Africa
Comair (South Africa) (1992–1996)
South Korea
Korean Air
Spain
Iberia
Eswatini
Royal Swazi National Airways
Sweden
Linjeflyg
Scandinavian Airlines
Tanzania
Air Tanzania
Turkey
Inter Airlines
Turkish Airlines
United Kingdom
Air Anglia
Air UK
United States
Air21
Altair Airlines
American Airlines (former Fokker 100 operator)
America West Express (Fokker 70 aircraft operated by Desert Sun Airlines, a subsidiary of Mesa Airlines)
Business Express (acquired a Pilgrim Airlines F28 but did not operate it in scheduled service)
Empire Airlines (merged into Piedmont Airlines (1948-1989))
Horizon Air (wholly owned subsidiary of Alaska Air Group)
Mid Pacific Air
Midway Airlines (Fokker 100 operator)
Novell Inc. (corporate shuttle operator)
Piedmont Airlines (merged into USAir)
Pilgrim Airlines (acquired by Business Express)
Temple Eastex Inc. (corporate operator which became Temple-Inland)
USAir (former Fokker F28 and Fokker 100 operator, renamed US Airways)
Wayne Newton (private operator)

== Military and government operators ==
=== Military operators ===
Algeria
Algerian Air Force
Argentina
Argentine Air Force
Argentine Naval Aviation
Bolivia
Bolivian Air Force
Ivory Coast
Cote d'Ivoire Air Force
Colombia
Colombian Air Force - Aircraft retired by 2026.
Ecuador
Ecuadorian Air Force
Gabon
Gabon Air Force
Ghana
Ghana Air Force
Indonesia
Indonesian Air Force
Malaysia
Royal Malaysian Air Force
Netherlands
Royal Flight
Peru
Peruvian Air Force
Philippines
Philippine Air Force - 1 active in 2024. Retired by 2026.
Togo
Togo Air Force

=== Government operators ===
Argentina
LADE - Líneas Aéreas Del Estado (2 as of August 2024; being replaced in service by Embraer ERJ 140 and retired)
Australia
Department of Transport (1972–82)
Airservices Australia (Civil Aviation Authority)
New Zealand
Airways Corporation of New Zealand (Operated by Civil Aviation Authority, Australia)
Tanzania
Tanzania Government Flight Agency
