= Coondewanna Airport =

Airport in the Pilbara region of Western Australia

- IATA: CJF; ICAO: YCWA

Summary
- Operator: BHP
- Location: Coondewanna, Western Australia
- Elevation AMSL: 709 m / 2,327 ft
- Coordinates: 22°58′00″S 118°48′08″E

Map
- Location in Western Australia

Runways
Direction	Length		Surface
Direction	m	ft	Surface
08L/26R	1,950	6,398	Concrete
- Sources: Australian AIP and aerodrome chart, STV

Coondewanna Airport (IATA: CJF, ICAO: YCWA) is an airport located near Mount Meharry and the Area C mine, in the Pilbara region of Western Australia.

There are around 16 flights per week from Perth to Coondewanna Airport and one from Busselton. The airport is owned and operated by BHP Iron Ore and is 2.4km from Coondewanna mining village camp. The airport has been served by Virgin Australia and Alliance Airlines.

== History ==
Construction of an airstrip took place in 2001, alongside construction of a railway line, to support the opening of the Area C Mine in 2003.

Major refurbishment to the airport was announced in 2017, to support increasing mining activities nearby. The refurbishment included resurfacing the runway and replacing the precision approach path indicator (PAPI).

In the 12 months between November 2021 and October 2022, there were a total of 1800 aircraft movements involving A320s, Fokker 100s and Fokker 70s, and 155,300 passengers.

== See also ==
- List of airports in Western Australia
- Aviation transport in Australia
