= INX =

INX may refer to:

- INX Network, the original name of 9X Media, headquartered in Mumbai, India
  - INX News, now known as NewsX
- INX, the ICAO airline designator for Inter Airlines, a former Turkish airline
- INX or InDesign Interchange, an older file format for Adobe InDesign software
- Prelude INX, a Honda car model introduced for the Japanese domestic market in 1989
- INX, South Korean boy group debuted in 2016 and disbanded in 2017.

== See also ==
- INXS
