= Flight 304 =

Flight 304 may refer to:

- BCPA Flight 304, crashed on 29 October 1953
- Trans-Canada Air Lines Flight 304, propeller loss on 9 July 1956
- Eastern Air Lines Flight 304, crashed on 25 February 1964
- Aeronor Flight 304, crashed on 9 December 1982
- Sempati Air Flight 304, crashed on 17 July 1997
