= Alliance Airlines =

Australian airline

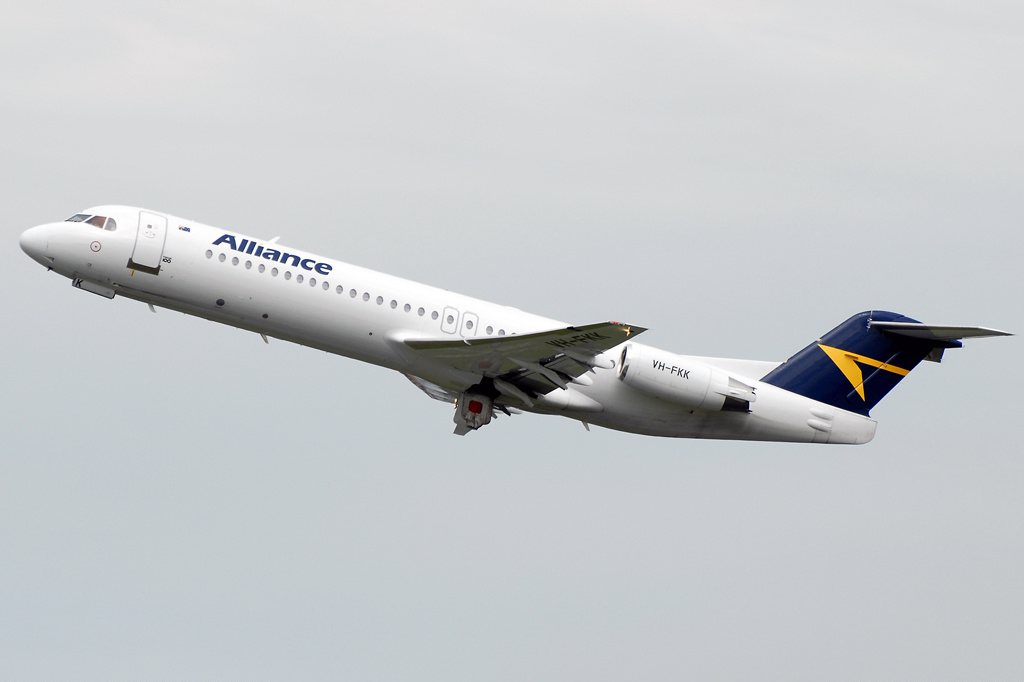
- Alliance Airlines Fokker 100
| IATA | ICAO | Call sign |
|---|---|---|
| QQ | UTY | UNITY |
- Founded: 2002; 24 years ago
- Operating bases: Adelaide; Brisbane; Cairns; Darwin; Perth; Rockhampton; Townsville
- Fleet size: 80 (30 June 2026; see Fleet)
- Parent company: Alliance Aviation Services Limited (ASX: AQZ)
- Headquarters: Brisbane, Queensland, Australia
- Key people: James Jackson (chairman); Steven Greenway (chief executive officer)
- Website: www.allianceairlines.com.au

Alliance Airlines Pty Limited is an Australian airline based at Brisbane Airport in Brisbane, Queensland, with operational bases in Adelaide, Cairns, Perth, Townsville, Darwin, and Rockhampton. Alliance Airlines owns and operates a fleet of Fokker and Embraer jet aircraft: Fokker 70, Fokker 100 and Embraer 190. Alliance runs fly-in fly-out (FIFO) air charter services for the Australian mining and resources industry, as well as private aircraft charters throughout Australia, New Zealand, the Pacific Islands and South East Asia. Alliance also provides aircraft component sales and leasing worldwide. It supplies aircraft and crews to other airlines, including flights operated under the QantasLink brand.

Established in 2002 following the acquisition of Flight West, Alliance is a subsidiary of Alliance Aviation Services Limited, which was listed on the Australian Securities Exchange in 2011. Qantas became a minority shareholder in 2019 and agreed to acquire the remaining shares in 2022. The proposed takeover was abandoned in 2023 after opposition from the Australian Competition and Consumer Commission; the airlines continued their wet-lease relationship.

== History ==
=== Formation and expansion ===
Alliance Airlines was established in 2002 when Queensland Airline Holdings acquired Flight West. Its early scheduled and charter operations included Brisbane–Townsville services and a Brisbane–Norfolk Island–Sydney route. The parent company, Alliance Aviation Services Limited, was listed on the Australian Securities Exchange on 20 December 2011.

Alliance was recognised as the first aircraft operator in Australia to attain Flight Safety Foundation Basic Aviation Risk Standard (BARS) Gold Status in 2013

In November 2015, Alliance announced the purchase of 6 Fokker 70 and 15 Fokker 100 aircraft from Austrian Airlines. The acquisition supported an expansion into aircraft leasing and the supply of engines, spare parts and other components to operators outside Australia, through a subsidiary in Slovakia.

In November 2018, Alliance was awarded CAPA Asia Pacific Regional Airline of the Year.

In August 2020, Alliance agreed to buy 14 Embraer 190 aircraft from Azorra Aviation. In December it agreed to acquire a further 16, formerly operated by American Airlines, taking the two purchases to 30 aircraft. The airline received approval to operate the E190 from the Civil Aviation Safety Authority on 31 March 2021.

On 27 February 2023, Alliance announced an agreement to purchase an additional 30 E190s from AerCap, with deliveries then expected between September 2023 and January 2026. Alliance said that some of the aircraft could be dismantled for engines and other components rather than entering service.

In November 2023, Alliance opened an A$60 million, three-bay maintenance, repair and overhaul facility at Rockhampton Airport. The facility was intended to bring work previously undertaken in Slovakia and the United Kingdom to Australia.

=== Qantas shareholding and proposed takeover ===
In February 2019, Qantas acquired a 19.9% shareholding. The Australian Competition and Consumer Commission (ACCC) investigated the purchase and raised concerns about its effect on Alliance's independence, expansion and ability to attract investment or alternative takeover bids. In April 2022, the ACCC closed that investigation without taking enforcement action, while saying that it would continue to monitor Qantas's conduct in relation to the stake.

On 5 May 2022, Qantas announced an agreement to acquire the remaining shares in Alliance in an all-share transaction involving approximately A$614 million in new Qantas shares. Alliance's board recommended the proposal, which was subject to regulatory, shareholder and court approvals.

On 20 April 2023, the ACCC announced that it opposed the acquisition. It concluded that removing Alliance as an independent competitor was likely to substantially lessen competition for air transport supplied to resources companies in Western Australia and Queensland, with a risk of higher prices and poorer service. The ACCC considered that other operators could not expand quickly enough to replace Alliance's competitive role, citing barriers including access to suitable aircraft, trained personnel and infrastructure. Qantas disputed the assessment, arguing that resources customers had substantial bargaining power and that combining the fleets would improve efficiency. Alliance also disputed the conclusion that the acquisition would substantially lessen competition.

The companies terminated the takeover agreement on 19 October 2023. Alliance said that pursuing clearance through contested court proceedings would require substantial additional resources. Qantas retained its minority shareholding, and the companies continued their aircraft leasing arrangements.

== Corporate affairs ==
Alliance Airlines is a subsidiary of Alliance Aviation Services Limited, which trades on the Australian Securities Exchange under the code AQZ. The group reported 1,350 full-time equivalent employees at 30 June 2026, with an operational presence in Adelaide, Darwin, Brisbane, Townsville, Cairns, Perth and Rockhampton. At that date, Qantas held 19.69% of the parent company's shares.

Founding managing director Scott McMillan stepped down from the board on 7 November 2025, and Stewart Tully became sole managing director. Steven Greenway was appointed chief executive officer effective 1 October 2026, succeeding Tully. James Jackson was chairman at the time of the appointment.

For the year ended 30 June 2026, the group reported a statutory net loss after tax of A$90.9 million, including non-cash impairments and asset write-downs primarily associated with its Fokker fleet. It reported an underlying profit before tax of A$38.2 million. In September 2026, Alliance announced the completion of a capital raising of approximately A$40 million.

== Services ==
=== Scheduled services ===
Alliance has operated scheduled passenger services alongside its contract and charter operations. In July 2020, it announced the introduction of its own Brisbane–Moranbah service from August, initially using Fokker 70 aircraft. In its assessment of the 2022–23 Qantas acquisition proposal, the ACCC identified Brisbane–Moranbah as Alliance's only regular public transport route operated in its own right.

=== Fly-in fly-out ===
Alliance provides fly-in fly-out air transport for mining and resources companies. Contract charter services are arranged around the customer's requirements, including the route, timetable and aircraft capacity, rather than an airline's published passenger schedule. Its customers have included BHP, for which it began operating Western Australian iron ore charter services in 2009; a contract extension announced in 2019 covered flights to Coondewanna and Barimunya.

Alliance and Virgin Australia also coordinated and jointly tendered for corporate charter contracts under an arrangement authorised by the ACCC in 2017. In May 2023, the regulator refused to renew the authorisation, concluding that the public benefits did not outweigh the likely harm from fewer competing bidders. It granted temporary interim authorisation for existing contracts to continue.

=== Aircraft lease ===
Alliance supplies aircraft and crews to other airlines under wet-lease agreements. Its Embraer 190 operations for Qantas are marketed under the QantasLink brand. In February 2021, the companies announced an initial three-year agreement covering three E190s, with options for another eleven. Alliance said it had supplied wet-leased aircraft to Qantas since 2012.

When the takeover agreement ended in October 2023, Qantas exercised options for four additional E190s, increasing the contracted fleet to 26, with options for four more. By June 2026, the allocation had reached 30 aircraft.

In February 2026, Alliance described the Qantas contract as commercially unviable and cash-flow negative, following rising costs and inadequate price adjustments. On 5 August 2026, it announced revised terms, including higher prices effective from 1 July and a revised annual escalation mechanism. The agreement provided for the allocation to Qantas to fall from 30 to 23 aircraft during the 2026–27 financial year, with fewer contracted flying hours. Alliance also announced workforce consultation and changes to its operating structure in response to the reduced flying requirements.

Other airline customers have included Virgin Australia, using Fokker 70 and Fokker 100 aircraft under wet leases. In November 2025, five E190s were on dry lease to Airnorth.

=== Aircraft charters ===
Alliance Airlines provides aircraft charters throughout Australia, New Zealand, the Pacific Islands and South East Asia.

== Fleet ==
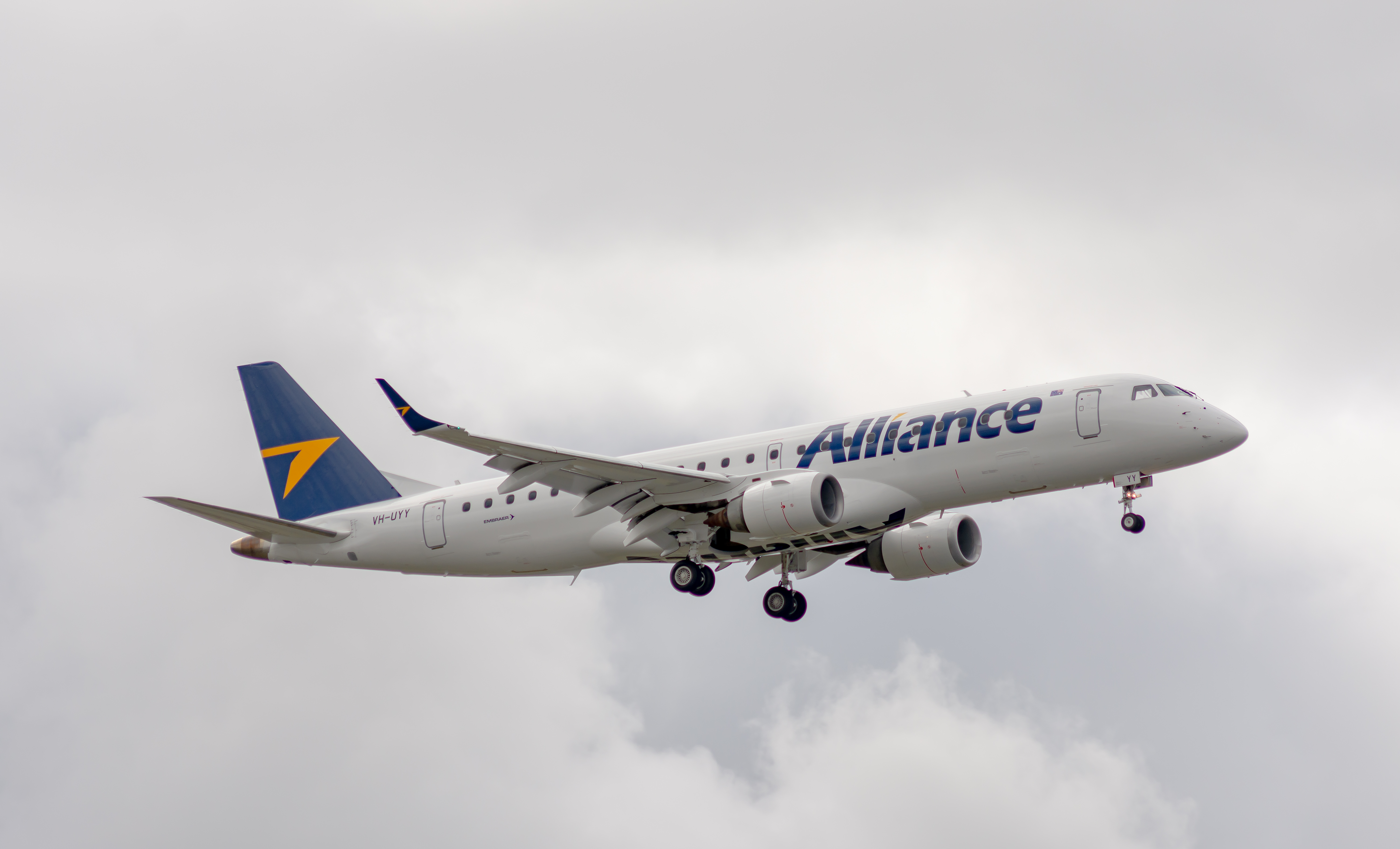
Alliance Airlines Embraer 190

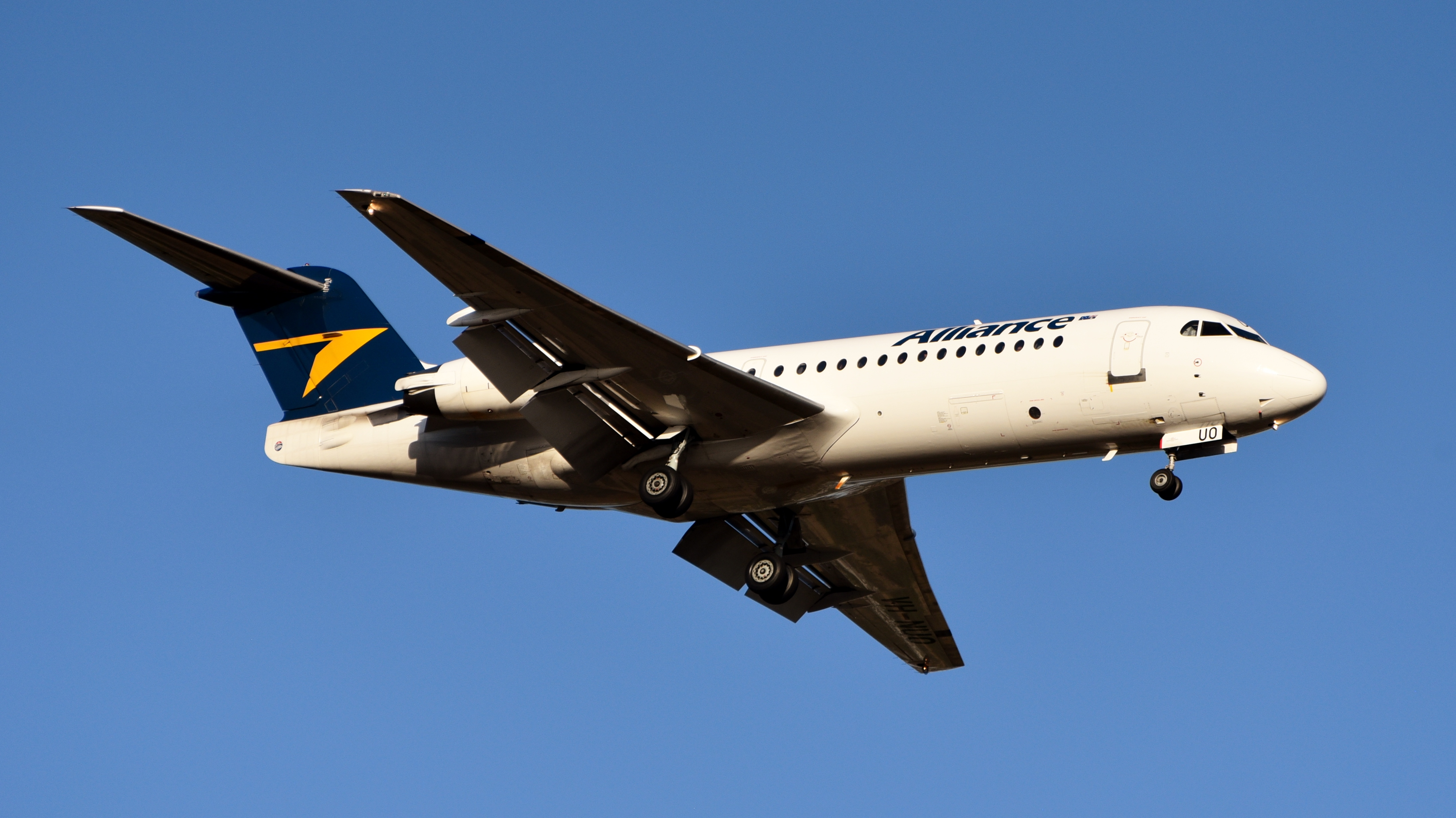
Alliance Airlines Fokker 70

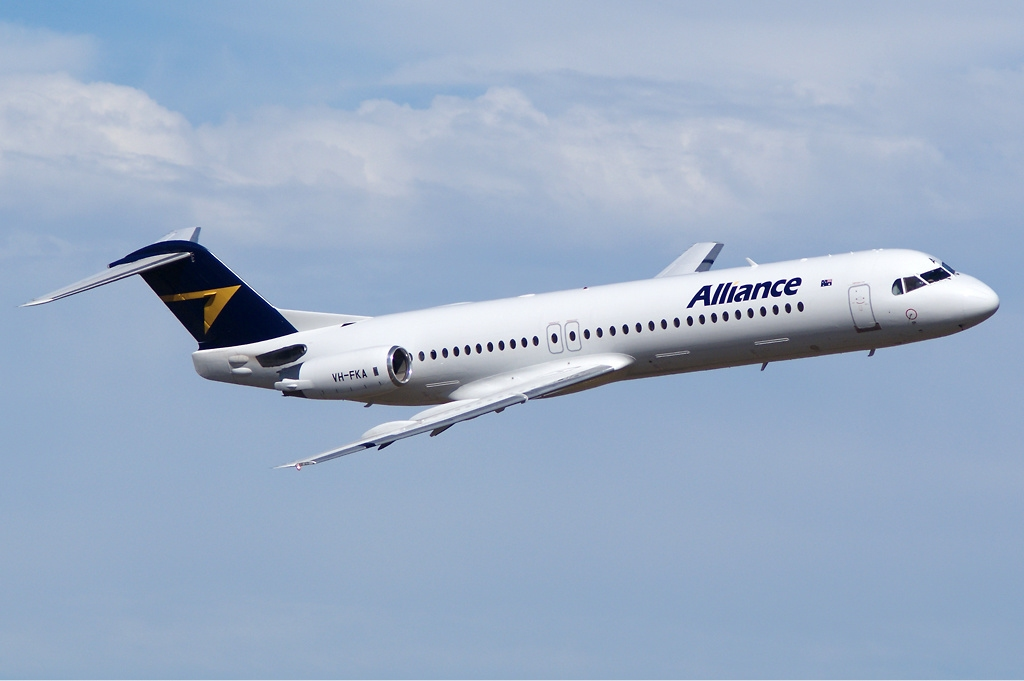
Alliance Airlines Fokker 100

=== Current fleet ===
At 30 June 2026, Alliance reported the following fleet. The total includes five aircraft on dry lease to another operator and five Fokker 100s in storage.

Alliance Airlines fleet at 30 June 2026
| Aircraft | Number | Passengers | Notes |
|---|---|---|---|
| Embraer 190 | 45 | 94–100 | Three cabin configurations |
| Fokker 70 | 12 | 80 | |
| Fokker 100 | 23 | 100 | Includes five in storage |
| Total | 80 | | |

In November 2026, chief executive Steven Greenway said that the airline was concentrating on replacing its Fokker 100s and Fokker 70s with E190s.

=== Former fleet ===
Alliance formerly operated five Fokker 50 turboprops. In August 2022, it announced their retirement and sale as part of a move to an all-jet fleet. The company linked the withdrawal to upgrades at Olympic Dam Airport, which allowed jet aircraft to replace the turboprops on those services.

== See also ==
- List of airlines of Australia
