= Yeongnam Air =

Regional airline in South Korea

Yeongnam Air 영남에어
IATA	ICAO	Call sign
OE	ONA	YEONGNAM AIR
- Founded: 2008
- Commenced operations: 25 July 2008
- Ceased operations: December 2008
- Operating bases: Daegu International Airport; Gimhae International Airport
- Fleet size: 1
- Destinations: 4
- Headquarters: Busan, South Korea
- Key people: Byong Hun, Oh
- Website: www.ynair.co.kr

Yeongnam Air (Korean: 영남에어) was a small regional airline of South Korea launched on 25 July 2008. Its main base was Gimhae International Airport and Daegu International Airport. It flew to Jeju International Airport and Gimpo Airport with a single aircraft. Yeongnam Air ceased all flights in December 2008 and formally closed in 2009.

== Destinations ==
Yeongnam Air served the following destinations prior to closure:

^{[Base]}	Base

City	Country	IATA	ICAO	Airport
Busan	South Korea	PUS	RKPK	Gimhae International Airport ^{[Main base]}
Daegu	South Korea	TAE	RKTN	Daegu International Airport
Jeju	South Korea	CJU	RKPC	Jeju International Airport
Seoul	South Korea	GMP	RKSS	Gimpo International Airport ^{[Base]}

== Fleet ==
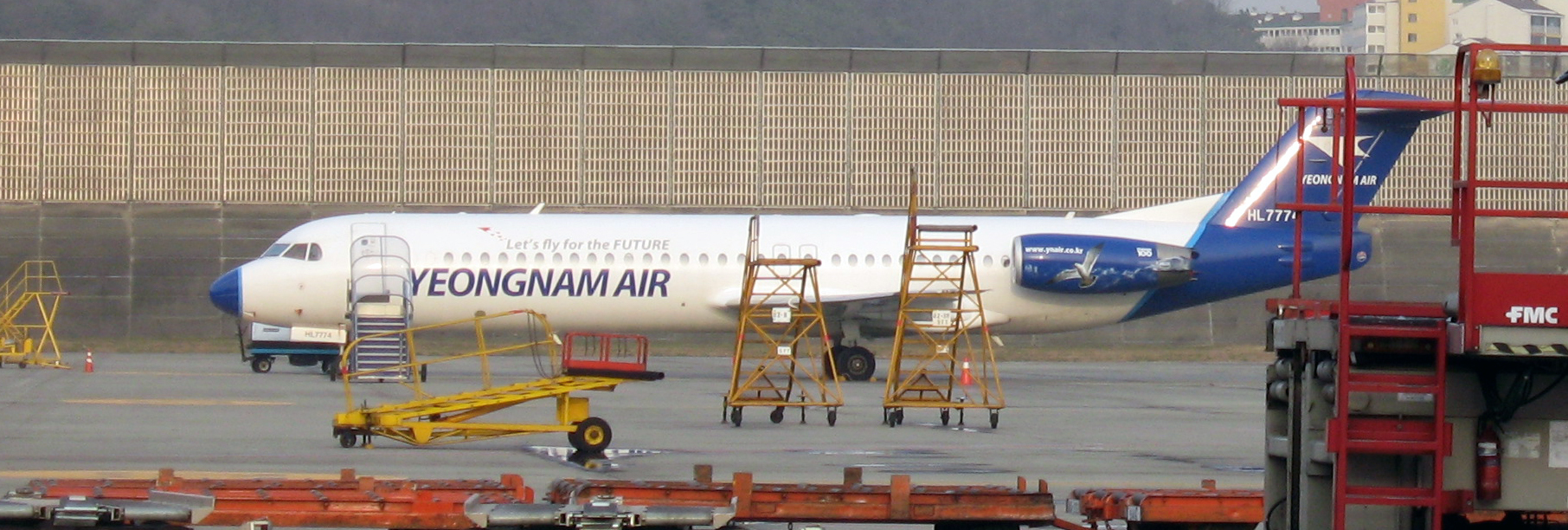
Yeongnam Air's only aircraft, a Fokker 100 at Gimpo International Airport, Seoul, South Korea. (2008)

Yeongnam Air operated only one aircraft throughout its operations, however the airline did plan on adding a second aircraft at a later date although this never materialised.

Yeongnam Air fleet
Aircraft	Total	Passengers	Notes
Fokker 100	1	80	
