= Fokker Next Gen =

Dutch aviation company

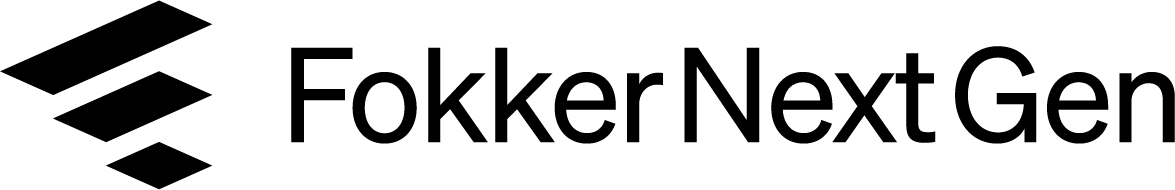
- Formerly: Rekkof Restart, Rekkof Aircraft, Netherlands Aircraft Company
- Type: Public limited company
- Industry: Aircraft manufacturing
- Founded: 1996; 30 years ago
- Founder: Jaap Rosen Jacobson
- Headquarters: Amsterdam, Netherlands
- Key people: Juriaan Kellermann (CEO)
- Number of employees: 20
- Parent: Panta Holdings BV
- Website: fokkernextgen.com

Fokker Next Gen NV (formerly Rekkof Restart - from Fokker spelled backwards, Rekkof Aircraft, and Netherlands Aircraft Company) is a Dutch company dedicated to develop and manufacture a hydrogen-powered regional airliner.

== History ==
Initially known as Rekkof Restart when the company was established in 1996, the company's intention was to restart the production of upgraded versions of the Fokker 70 and Fokker 100 regional jets as production of those stopped when Fokker was declared bankrupt in 1996. The initial plan was to start building unmodified versions of both the Fokker 70 and the Fokker 100. For this all tooling for these airplanes was bought from Fokker during the bankruptcy period. Later on the decision was made to make several improvements to the airframe. This resulted in the Fokker 120NG which was further stretched to the Fokker 130NG due to altered market demands. The Fokker 130NG would be able to carry 130 to 138 passengers. It would get a new interior, improved avionics, a fly-by-wire system, sharklets and two Pratt & Whitney PurePower PW1217G-engines.

Rekkof believed there was a sufficient market for the aircraft and that the design could still compete with similar modern regional airliners from such manufacturers as Embraer and Bombardier Aerospace. The future of the project started to look bright when in 2007 both Premion and VLM Airlines placed an order for 25 Fokker 100NG and investor Mubadala was in negotiations for an investment of about 1 billion US dollars. However, the deal with Mubadala never materialized. In the end of 2014, another unnamed investor showed interest to invest 1 billion US dollars in the project but this never finalized as the investor was never heard of again.

In March 2010, it was announced that the Dutch government granted the company a 20 million euro loan to help develop the aircraft by acquiring the Fokker 100 testbed aircraft PH-MKH from Fokker Technologies. Though Rekkof has stated that it prefers to assemble the aircraft in the Netherlands, with Lelystad Airport and Enschede Airport Twente mentioned as possible assembly locations, Bangalore in India had also been mentioned as a possible location with Indian engineering firm Cades Digitech having stated it was planning to invest 300 million US dollars in an assembly plant. Construction of an aircraft parts plant started in November 2011 in the Brazilian state of Goiás in the city of Anápolis (some 35 mi/55 km from state capital Goiânia). The works were however suspended due to the crisis in Europe. Later on, Rekkof mentioned that assembly of the airplane would have to stay in the Netherlands due to certification procedures.

Between 2010 and 2023, the project did not seem to progress. Since the Dutch government was allowed to supply Rekkof funds to develop the new aircraft, not a lot happened. Rekkof visualised its plane on its website. No public report has been produced detailing spending of government-supplied funds. Parliamentary documents show that Rekkof has, thus far, not been able to co-finance the development.

In 2023, after years of no development nor updates from Netherlands Aircraft Company, the company announced its comeback as Fokker Next Gen. Along with this, they presented their upcoming plans of developing and manufacturing a whole new regional airliner powered by hydrogen. Despite having released previews of the aircraft in form of visualisations, its name has not yet been publicly disclosed. It's planned to launch and be delivered to customers in 2035.

Before launching its all-new airliner, Fokker Next Gen plans to retrofit an existing Fokker 100 with hydrogen engines first. The first flight test for the Fokker 100 on hydrogen is planned to happen in 2028.

On 13 May, 2024, AirBaltic signed a Memorandum of understanding with Fokker Next Gen to strengthen teamwork and collaboration into the incorporation of hydrogen powered aircraft, which are meant to be able to come into service in 2035. The MoU, which notes the collaboration between airBaltic and Fokker Next Gen, will "include the incorporation of end user feedback into the design and development of the Fokker Next Gen liquid hydrogen combustion powered aircraft."

== Ownership ==
Fokker Next Gen is a part of Panta Holdings BV, who also own two leftover companies from Fokker's bankruptcy in 1996; Fokker Services and Fokker Techniek. The company also formerly owned Denim Air and VLM Airlines, both operating Fokker 50 aircraft. Denim Air stopped flying in 2010 and resumed operations after successful restructuring until 2016, while VLM Airlines has been sold to Cityjet.

== Proposed products ==
- NAC Fokker 90NG – 100 passenger regional jet based on Fokker 70. Never materialized.
- NAC Fokker F130 NG – 138 passenger regional jet based on Fokker 100. Never materialized.
- Fokker Next Gen (FNG) – Unnamed hydrogen-powered regional airliner. Currently in development, planning to launch in 2035.
