= Rolls-Royce RB.183 Tay =

Medium-bypass turbofan aircraft engine

Tay
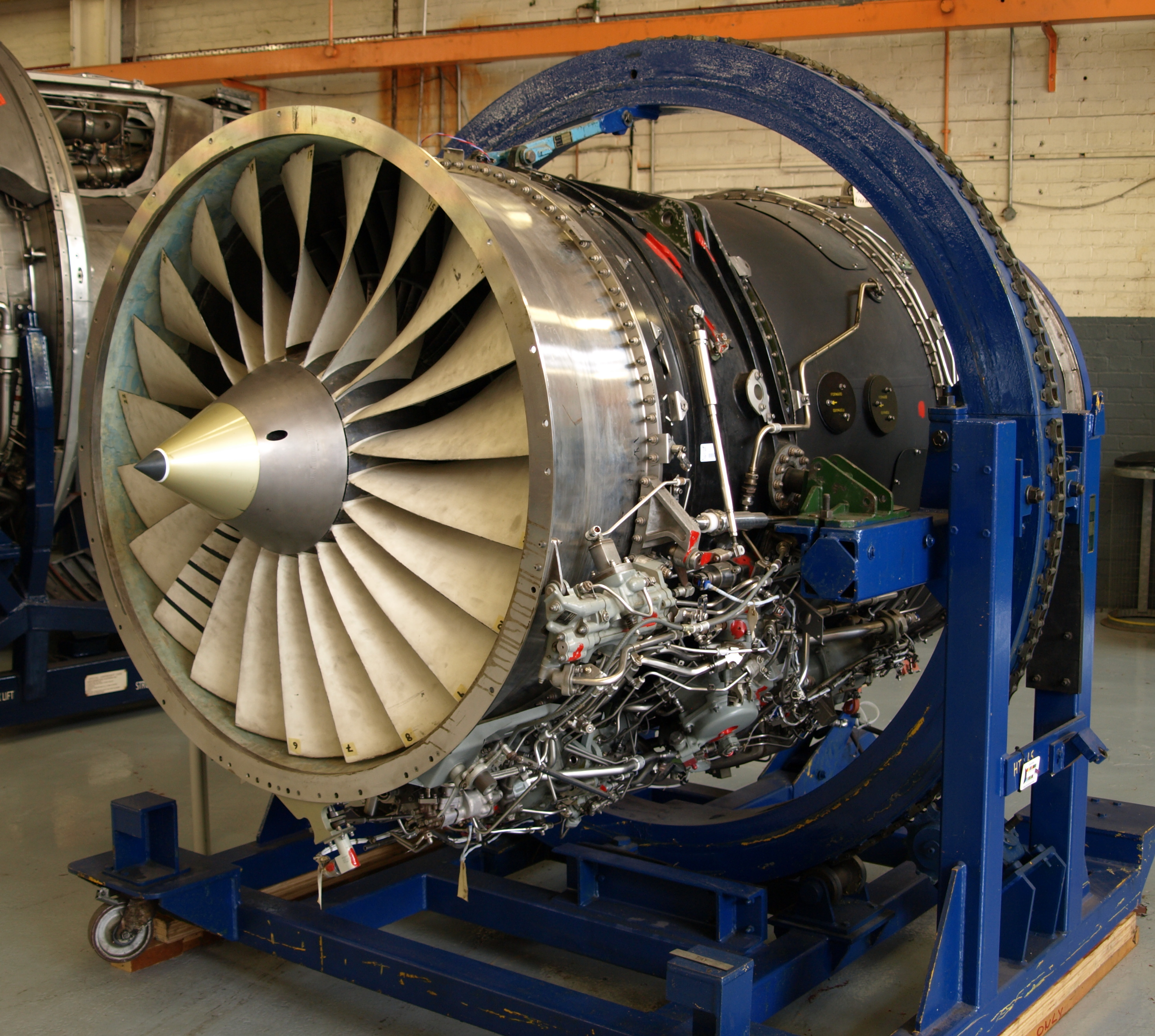
- Rolls-Royce RB.183 Tay turbofan engine on display at the Rolls-Royce Heritage Trust, Derby
- Type: Turbofan
- Manufacturer: Rolls-Royce plc
- First run: 1984
- Major applications: Fokker 70; Fokker 100; Gulfstream IV; Gulfstream G350/G400/G450
- Developed from: Rolls-Royce Spey
- Developed into: Rolls-Royce BR700

The Rolls-Royce RB.183 Tay is a medium-bypass turbofan engine, developed from the RB.183 Mk 555 Spey core and using a fan scaled directly from the Rolls-Royce RB.211-535E4 to produce versions with a bypass ratio of 3.1:1 or greater. The IP compressor and LP turbine were designed using technology from the RB.211 programme. The engine was first run in August 1984. The Tay 650 had a new HP turbine which incorporated new technology which had been proven with the RB.211-535E4. This engine also had a new combustor for improved durability. The Tay family is used on a number of airliners and larger business jets, including the Gulfstream IV family, Fokker 70 and Fokker 100, with a later version being used to re-engine Boeing 727-100s.

== Variants ==
=== Tay 611-8 ===
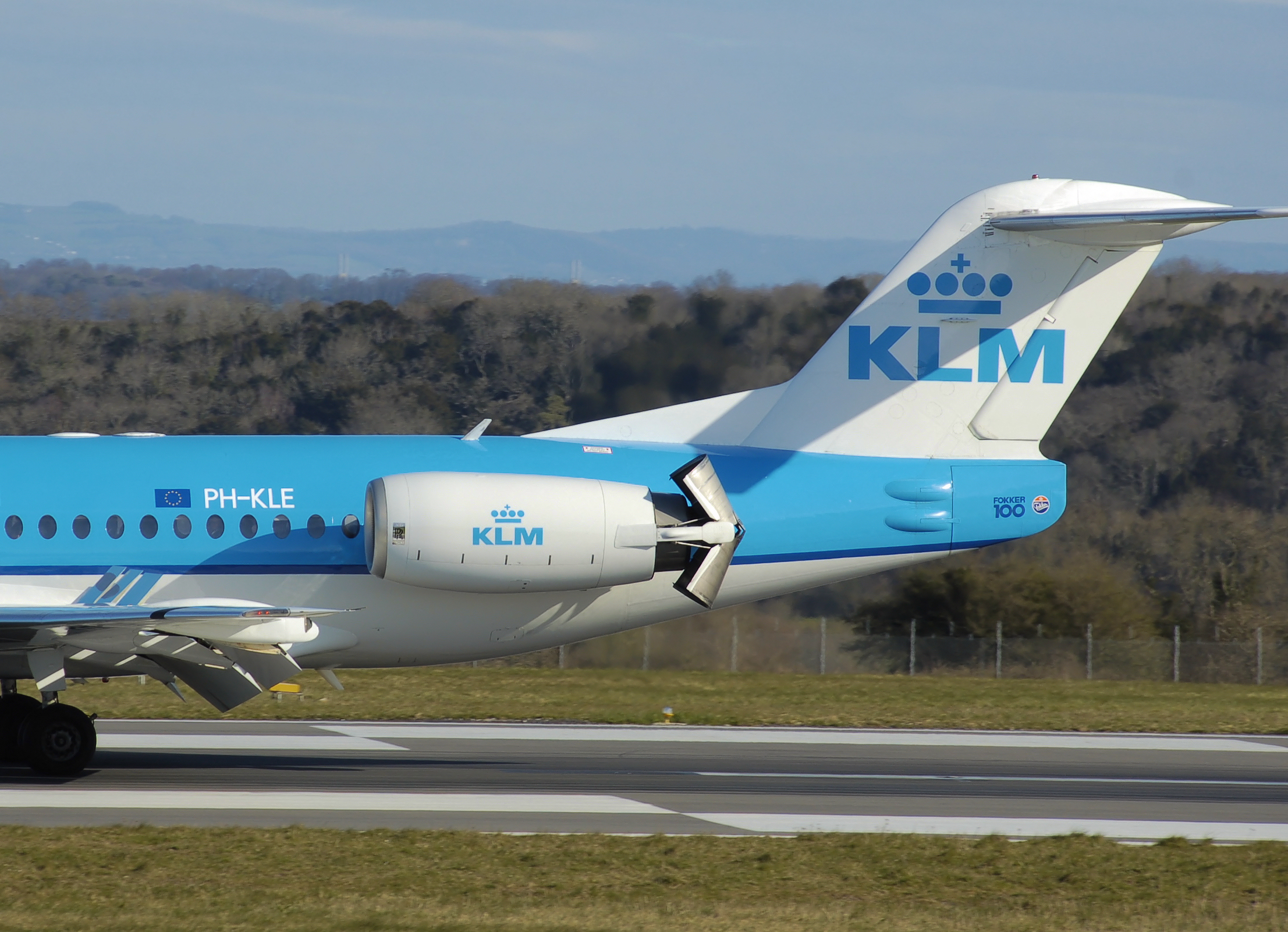
Rolls-Royce Tay on a Fokker 100, with thrust reverser engaged.

Originally designated 610-8, all but one training engine have now been converted to 611-8 standard. The newest variant is the 611-8C, which has cast HP1 turbine blades, larger fan from the 650-15, structural by-pass duct and FADEC.

All Tay engines use a 22-blade titanium fan, a 3-stage intermediate-pressure compressor coupled to the fan shaft, a 12-stage high-pressure compressor, a 2-stage high-pressure turbine and a 3-stage low-pressure turbine.

Thrust: 13,850 lbf (62 kN) Aircraft: Tay 611 entered service in 1987 on the Gulfstream IV/IV-SP, for which it is the exclusive powerplant.

=== Tay 620-15 ===
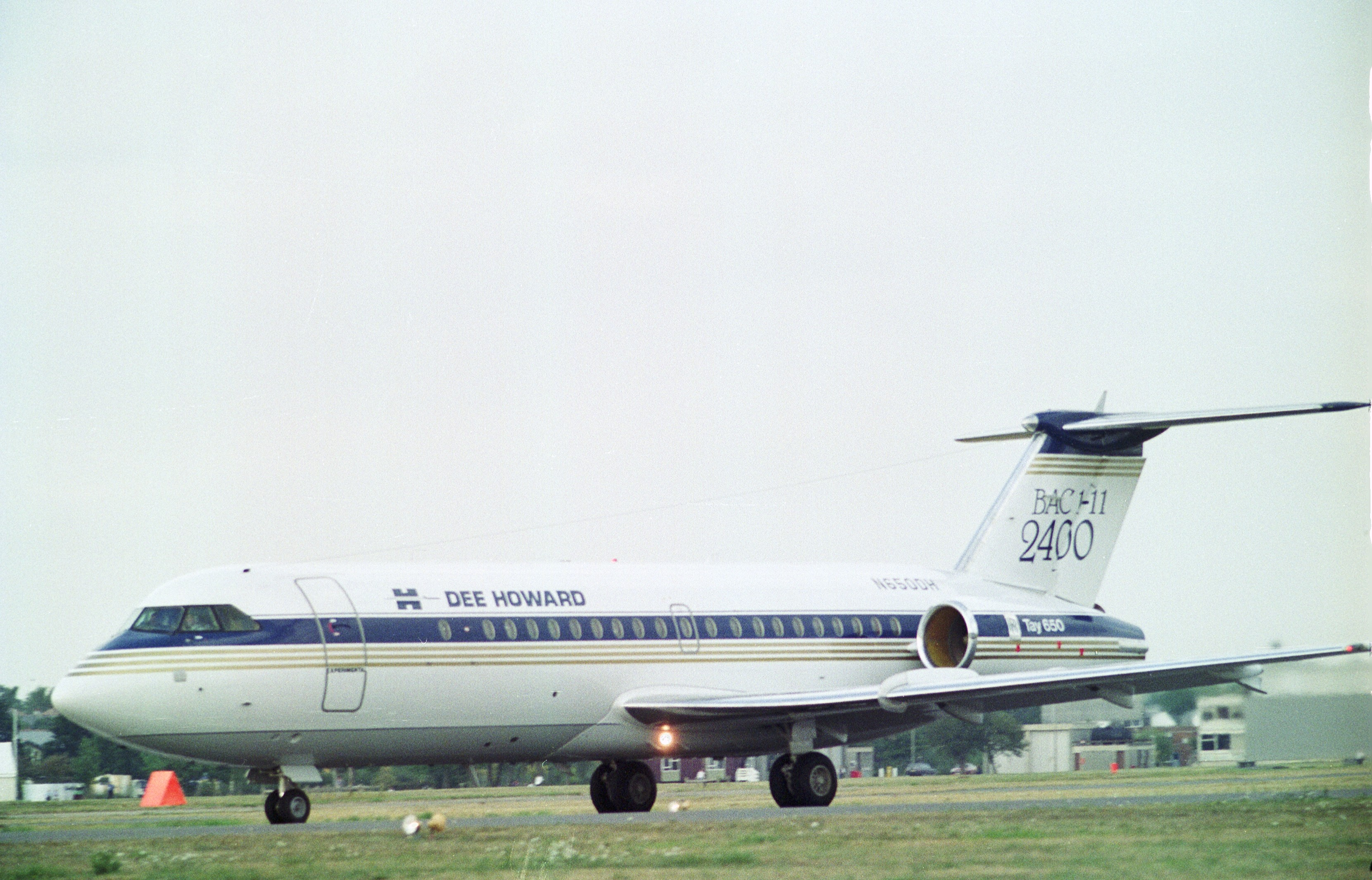
A BAC 1-11 re-engined with the Tay

The 620-15 is internally identical to the 611-8 and externally similar to the 650-15.

Thrust: 13,850 lbf (62 kN) Aircraft: Fokker 70 from 1994, Fokker 100 from 1988

=== Tay 650-15 ===
Thrust: 15,100 lbf (67 kN) Aircraft: Originally designed to re-engine the BAC One-Eleven (650-14, only two made; both have since been converted to 650-15 standard.), the 650-15 entered service on the Fokker 100 in 1989.

=== Tay 651-54 ===
The 651-54 is internally identical to the 650-15. The externals and gearbox suit the Boeing 727.

Thrust: 15,400 lbf (69 kN) Aircraft: Boeing 727-100 from 1992. Conversion from three JT8D-7 to three Tay 651-54 was carried out by the now defunct Dee Howard Aircraft Maintenance Company in San Antonio, Texas, for the United Parcel Service, but all aircraft have since been withdrawn from service. Only one private 727 was converted.

== Applications ==
- BAC 1-11
- Boeing 727-100 QF
- Fokker 70
- Fokker 100
- Gulfstream IV
- Gulfstream G350/G400/G450
- Gulfstream X-54

== Engines on display ==
- A Tay RB.183 620-15 is on public display at the City of Norwich Aviation Museum in Horsham St Faith, Norfolk.

== Specifications (Tay 620-15) ==
Data from Rolls-Royce and FAA TCDS.

==== General characteristics ====
- Type: Twin-spool medium bypass turbofan
- Length: 94.7 in (240.5 cm)
- Diameter: 44 in (111.8 cm) (fan diameter)
- Dry weight: 3,310 lb (1,501 kg)

==== Components ====
- Compressor: Single-stage fan plus a 3-stage IP compressor (Same shaft.) and a 12-stage HP compressor
- Combustors: 10 can-annular combustion chambers
- Turbine: 2 stage HP turbine, 3 stage LP turbine

==== Performance ====
- Maximum thrust: 13,850 lbf (63 kN)
- Bypass ratio: 3.04:1
- Thrust-to-weight ratio: 4.2

== See also ==
Comparable engines

- General Electric CF34
- IAE V2500
- Lycoming ALF 502
- PowerJet SaM146
- Pratt & Whitney PW6000
- Progress D-436
- Rolls-Royce BR700

Related lists

- List of aircraft engines
