= Fokker 70 =

Regional airliner developed from Fokker 100 produced 1992–1997

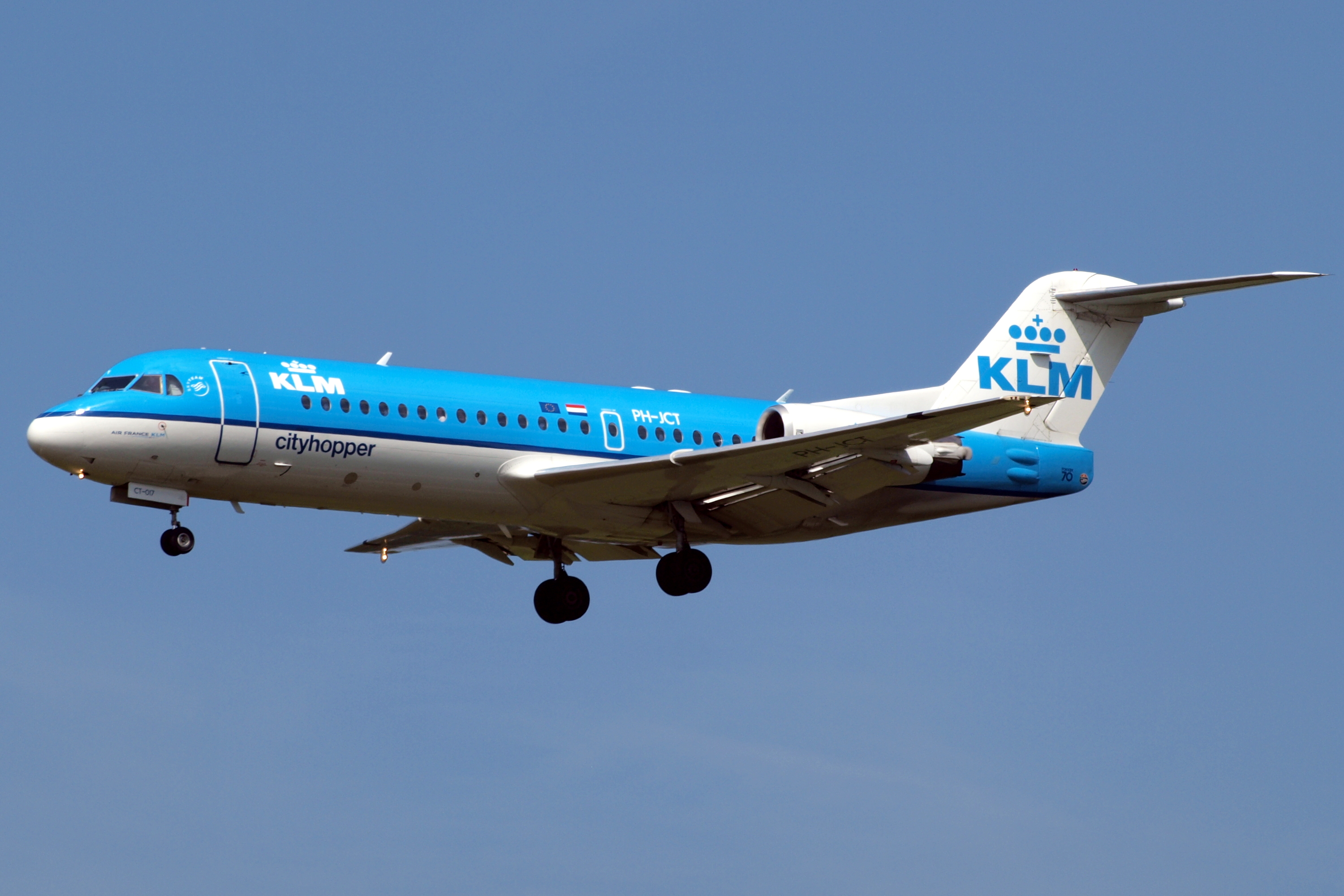
- KLM Cityhopper Fokker 70

General information
- Type: Regional jet
- National origin: Netherlands
- Manufacturer: Fokker
- Status: In service
- Primary users: Alliance Airlines Air Niugini; KLM Cityhopper (Former); Austrian Airlines (Former)
- Number built: 47 (+1 prototype)

History
- Manufactured: 1992-1997
- Introduction date: October 1994 with Ford Motor Company (private); 1995 with Sempati Air (commercial)
- First flight: 4 April 1993
- Developed from: Fokker 100

The Fokker 70 is a narrow-body, twin-engined, medium-range, turbofan regional airliner designed and produced by the now defunct Dutch aircraft manufacturer Fokker.

It was developed during the early 1990s as a smaller version of the newly-developed Fokker 100. Both the Fokker 70 and Fokker 100 were preceded by the first jet airliner manufactured by the company, the Fokker F28 Fellowship. On 4 April 1993, the type performed its maiden flight, while it was introduced to service during the following year. The Fokker 70 was in production for only a relatively short period, between 1992 and 1997, during which 47 aircraft, as well as a single prototype, were completed. Its production had been terminated as a result of the bankruptcy of Fokker in 1996. There had been persistent efforts to restart production of the Fokker 70 by Rekkof. As of June 2022, 34 aircraft of the original production run are reportedly still in active service with various airlines and governments around the world.

== Development ==
During November 1992, the Fokker company of the Netherlands commenced development of a new airliner intended to replace the aging Fokker F28 airliner with a more modern and fuel efficient aircraft. The specification for the Fokker 70 was shaped by requirements outlined by several airlines, which had determined that both the Fokker 50 and ATR 42 were too small, while the Boeing 737 and MD-80 were deemed to be too large. By aiming for this sector of the market, Fokker had opted to compete for the highly competitive top end of the regional airliner market.

To ease its development of such an airliner, Fokker opted to use the newly-developed Fokker 100 as a basis, shrinking it by the elimination of various sections of the fuselage to reduce the plane's total length by 4.62 metres (15.2 ft), while features such as the wings and tail unit were relatively untouched. In line with these specifications, the aircraft had a maximum capacity for 80 passengers; however, this was reduced to a maximum of 70 passenger for airliners sold within the U.S. market in order to comply with "scope clause" requirements rather than any Federal Aviation Administration (FAA) mandates relating to its certification.

On 4 April 1993, the Fokker 70 performed its maiden flight from the company's manufacturing base at Woensdrecht in southern Netherlands, which had a duration of three hours. During the test flight programme, trials were carried out at Granada in Spain in support of steep approach certification. During July 1994, the first production standard aircraft made its first flight. On 14 October 1994, type certification was granted for the Fokker 70 (as Fokker 28 Mk. 0070), while the first delivery to a customer (made to the Ford Motor Company in an "Executive Jet" configuration) occurred later that same month.

As had been announced at the Paris Air Show in June 1993, the launch customer for the Fokker 70 was the now-defunct Indonesian airline, Sempati Air and Pelita Air. During March 1995, Sempati became the first airline to receive a Fokker 70. In November 1993, it was announced that British Midland International (BMI) had agreed terms for the long-term lease of five Fokker 70s, and had thus become the first European airline to order the Fokker 70. The first US customer was Mesa Airlines, which ordered a pair of airliners in December 1993. By August 1995, 10 Fokker 70s had reportedly been delivered, while orders for 42 more were reportedly held by the company.

During April 1997, the final Fokker 70 was delivered, at which point the production line was closed down as a result of Fokker's bankruptcy during the previous year. A total of 47 Fokker 70s were completed during its relatively short production life. Despite the original production run of the Fokker 70 having been brought to an end, efforts to restore the company and its products have been made by Rekkof ("Fokker" spelt backwards). Since 1999, it has made protracted efforts to negotiate the re-opening of both the Fokker 100 and Fokker 70 lines.

== Design ==
The Fokker 70 is a narrow-body, twin-engined, medium-range regional airliner. It is powered by a pair of Rolls-Royce Tay 620 turbofan engines, positioned at either side of the aircraft and mounted on the rear fuselage; each engine is capable of providing up to 61.6 kN (13,849 lb) of thrust. The weight varies from 22,673 kilograms (49,985 lb) when empty to 41,730 kilograms (92,000 lb) at maximum takeoff weight (MTOW). The Fokker 70 is equipped with an airbrake fitted upon its tail section, in a somewhat similar arrangement to that found on the competing British Aerospace 146, which allows it to conform with the 5.5° glide slope to perform steep descents, as required at London City Airport. It is outfitted with a similar avionics suite to that of the Fokker 100.

During the first two decades of operations, there were multiple incidents of ice having formed on the leading edge of the wing; during January 2009, the European Union Aviation Safety Agency (EASA) issued a mandate that all Fokker 70s and Fokker 100s operated in Europe would be required to be outfitted with on-ground heating apparatus to counteract ice formation. Early on, safety-critical issues with the aircraft's thrust reversers were uncovered; in December 1996, Fokker instructed all operators to conduct inspections.

== Operational history ==
The vast majority of Fokker 70s were delivered to various operators in the European market. One early customer for the Fokker 70 was the Dutch flag carrier KLM, who opted to replace its remaining Fokker F28s with the type. The company's regional airline subsidiary KLM Cityhopper operated the Fokker 70 for numerous years; on 28 October 2017, the final flight of a KLM Fokker 70 was conducted. The Italian flag carrier Alitalia at one point had 15 Fokker 70s on order via leasing agreements for its subsidiary Avianova; on 20 December 1995, the first example was put into revenue service. However, its operations of the type would be relatively brief; by February 1997, the company had decided to return its fleet. On 30 October 1995, the French flag carrier Air France introduced its first Fokker 70, typically using it as a replacement for its ATR 42s.

During 1995, a pair of aircraft were delivered to Desert Sun Airlines, a subsidiary of Mesa Airlines, and were operated as America West Express flights as part of a promotional effort in support of the Fokker 70 within the United States; the purchase agreement permitted the operator to return the aircraft within 12 to 18 months. Although the earlier Fokker 100 had been able to achieve moderate sales within the United States, securing orders from American Airlines, and USAir (which subsequently merged with American Airlines), only two aircraft of the Fokker 70 variant were delivered for service in the United States. During March 1996, Fokker entered bankruptcy, which brought an abrupt end to its sales campaign in the U.S. market. Accordingly, the two America West Express aircraft operated by a subsidiary of Mesa Airlines became an expensive subfleet and were returned to Europe in 1997, ending the relatively short tenure of Fokker 70 operation in the United States.

As an individual aircraft's original operator opted to withdraw it, they did not typically mark the end of its useful life. Instead, companies such as Fokker Services would often acquire such aircraft, refurbish them, and secure new secondhand operators for the type. Fokker Services would also provide long term support to operators of the Fokker 70, such as Austrian Airlines, which was operating a fleet of 24 airliners by January 2010.

As early as the late 1990s, some operators opted to replace their often small Fokker 70 fleets with alternative, and often more modern, airliners. During 1998, it was reported that SilkAir was replacing both its Boeing 737s and Fokker 70s with new-build Airbus A320s. In 1999, BMI was evaluating potential replacements for its Fokker 70s and Fokker 100s. During 2015, Austrian Airlines received approval for its purchase of 17 used Embraer 195s to replace its Fokker 70s and Fokker 100s; the complete introduction of this new fleet was achieved over the following two years.

== Current operators ==
As of October 2022, 32 aircraft remain in service with seven airlines and two governments:

- Alliance Airlines (11)
- Air Niugini (4)
- Fly All Ways (3)
- Kenya Air Force (1); still in service as of 2026
- Myanmar Air Force (2)
- Wayraperú (2)
- Jetways Airlines (1)
- SKA (1)
- Skyward Express (1)

=== Former operators ===
- Air France (as Air France Régional)
- Alitalia
- KLM Cityhopper (including an aircraft used by the Dutch royal family occasionally piloted by the king)
- Austrian Airlines
- British Midland Airways
- Insel Air
- Malév
- Mesa Airlines (operated as America West Express)
- Pelita Air Service
- Silk Air
- Tyrolean Airways (with Tyrolean livery until 2015 and operating under Austrian Arrows brand on behalf of Austrian thereafter)
- Vietnam Airlines
- TransNusa

== Accidents and incidents ==
- On 5 January 2004 at 08:17 local time, an Austrian Airlines Fokker 70 (registered OE-LFO) crash-landed in a snow-covered field near Munich Airport. The aircraft had been operating Flight 111 from Vienna to Munich with 28 passengers and four crew on board, when its engines failed during landing descent due to icing. The aircraft was severely damaged, but was repaired and returned to service. Only three passengers suffered minor injuries.

== Aircraft on display ==
Netherlands

- 11528 – Fokker 70 registered PH-JCH, formerly operated by KLM Cityhopper and later used by JetAir Caribbean as PJ-JAB, this airframe is preserved and displayed in its classic KLM Cityhopper livery at the Luchtvaartmuseum Aviodrome in Lelystad, Netherlands.
- 11547 – Fokker 70 registered PH-KBX, the former Dutch Royal Family and government VIP transport, which was famously co-piloted by King Willem-Alexander to maintain his commercial pilot license, was retired and subsequently acquired for preservation as a ground training and historical exhibition asset.

== Specifications ==
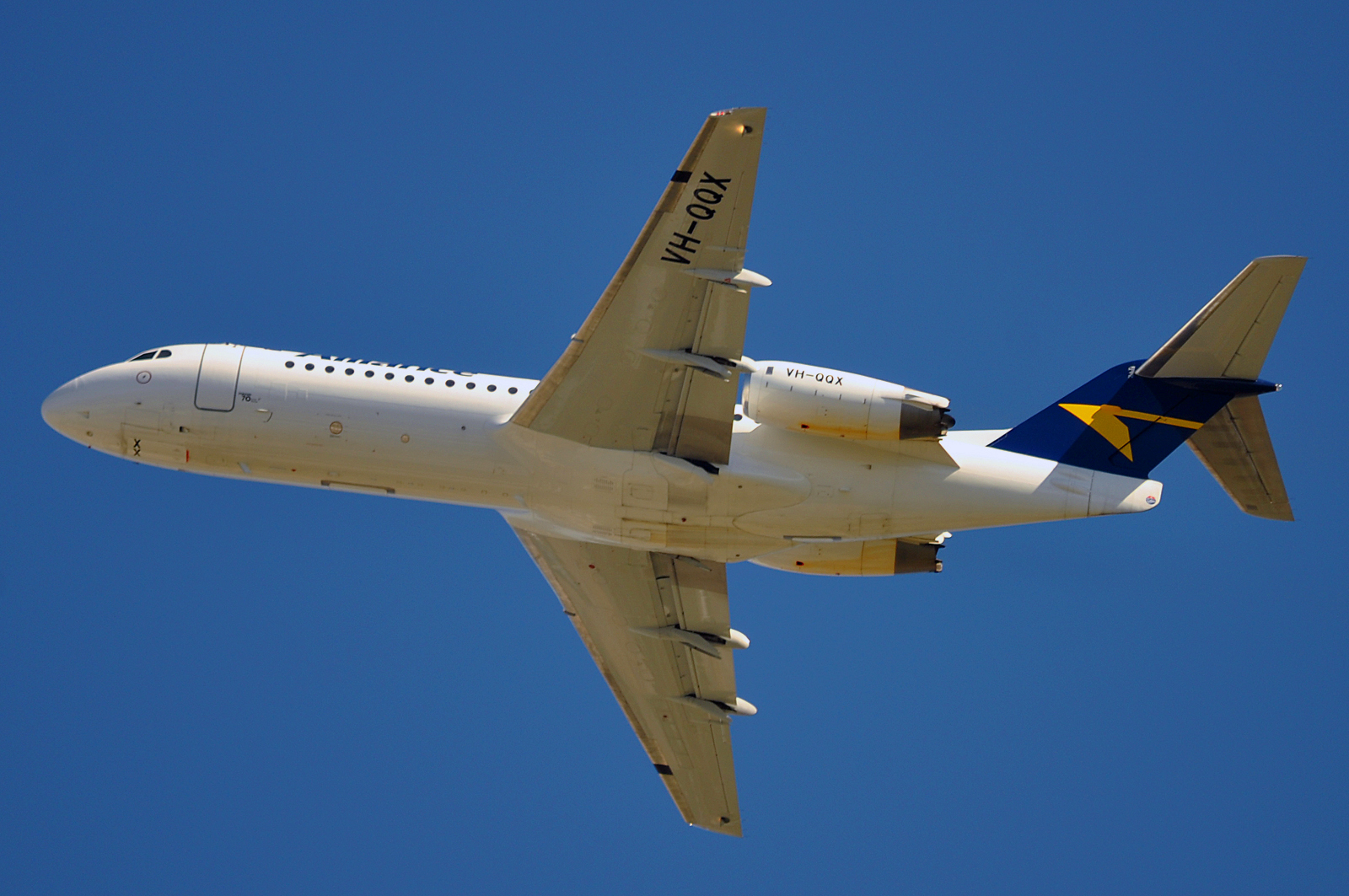
Alliance Airlines F70 from below

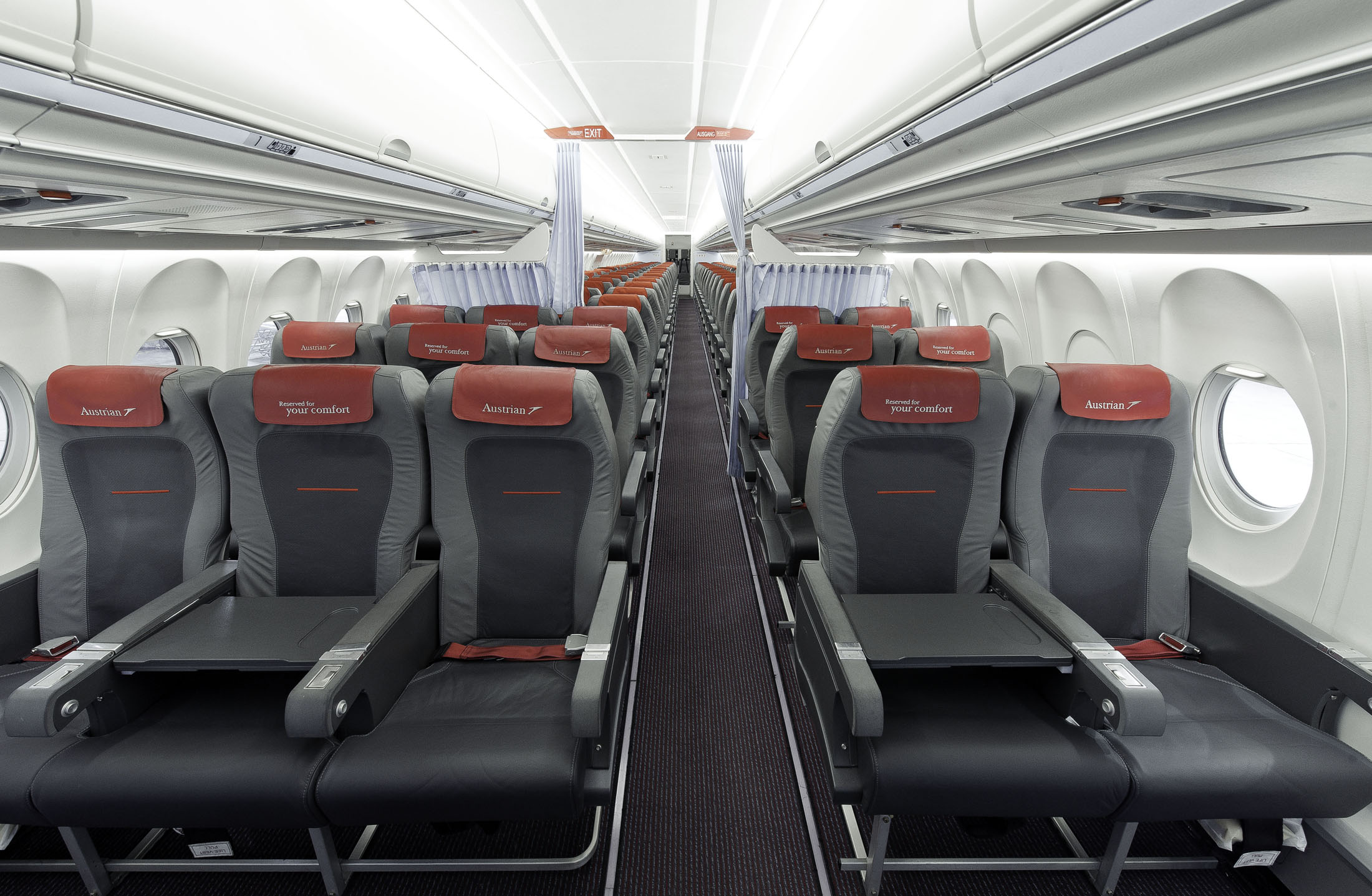
Cabin of a former Austrian Airlines F70

Data from airliners.net, aer.ita.br, flyfokker.com,

General characteristics

- Crew: two
- Capacity:
  85 (1-class, maximum at 76 cm (30 in) seat pitch)
  79 (1-class, typical at 81 cm (32 in) seat pitch)
  72 (2-class, typical at 91 cm (36 in) and 81 cm (32 in) seat pitches)
- Length: 30.91 m (101 ft 5 in)
- Wingspan: 28.08 m (92 ft 2 in)
- Width: 3.30 m (10 ft 10 in)
- Height: 8.5 m (28 ft 10 in)
- Wing area: 93.5 m^{2} (1,006 sq ft)
- Empty weight: 22,673 kg (49,985 lb)
- Max takeoff weight: 39,915 kg (87,998 lb) High weight option
- Powerplant: 2 × Rolls-Royce Tay 620 , 61.6 kN (13,850 lbf) thrust each

Performance

- Cruise speed: 845 km/h (525 mph, 456 kn)
- Range: 3,410 km (2,119 mi, 1,841 nmi)
- Service ceiling: 11,000 m (36,000 ft)

== See also ==
Related development

- Fokker F28 Fellowship
- Fokker 100

Aircraft of comparable role, configuration, and era

- Antonov An-148
- BAe 146
- Bombardier CRJ700/900
- Embraer E-170/175
- Fairchild Dornier 728 family

Related lists

- List of jet airliners
- List of civil aircraft
