= Intair =

Canadian airline (1989–1991)

Intair Intair
IATA	ICAO	Call sign
ND	INT	Intair
- Founded: 1989
- Ceased operations: 1991
- Hubs: Montreal, Quebec City Sept-Iles, Quebec
- Focus cities: Toronto
- Fleet size: 14+
- Destinations: See destination listing
- Parent company: Air Atonabee Ltd.
- Headquarters: Mississauga, Ontario (1989-1991)
- Key people: Michel Leblanc (until 1991 February. Since 1991 march Steven Stansfred)

Intair was a Canada-based airline that operated between 1989 and 1991.

== History ==
Intair operated passenger jet service between Toronto and Montreal with Fokker 100 aircraft as well as scheduled jet and turboprop passenger service to other destinations in eastern Canada and also charter flights between Canada and such vacation destinations as Orlando and Ft.Lauderdale in Florida. According to the Official Airline Guide (OAG), in late 1989 Intair was operating up to twelve nonstop flights a day between Montreal Dorval Airport (YUL) and Toronto Pearson Airport (YYZ) primarily with the Fokker 100 twin jet and was also operating F100 jet service nonstop between Montreal and Quebec City, Rouyn-Noranda, Saguenay and Val-d'Or in Quebec province, and nonstop between Montreal and Moncton in New Brunswick province as well.

The airline began operations after Nordair was purchased by Canadian Pacific Airlines. Intair used Nordair's IATA two letter "ND" airline code. The airline was established in 1989 by City Express as a successor to Skycraft Air Transport. It served many destinations in Quebec province formerly served by Quebecair and also flew to destinations in New Brunswick, Newfoundland and Labrador, and Ontario provinces of Canada.

Intair ceased operations on 26 August 1991.

== Fleet ==
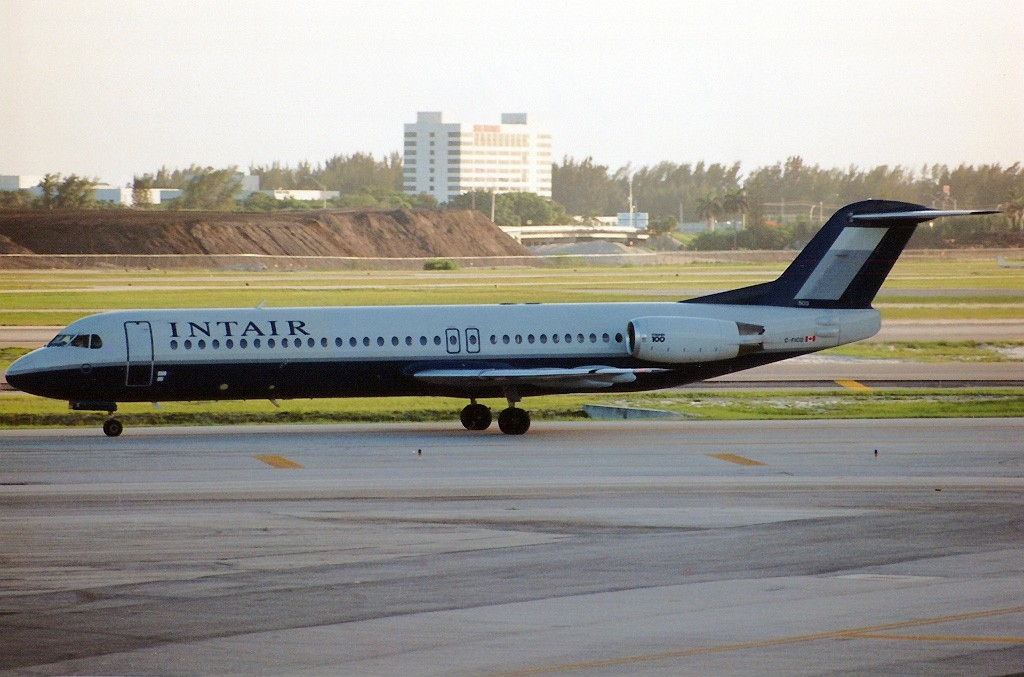
Intair Fokker 100

- Fokker 100 x 6 - only jet aircraft type operated by the airline
- ATR 42 turboprop x 6
- Fairchild Swearingen SA-226 Metro II turboprop (multiple aircraft) one was C-GQAL which was delivered to Propair and crashed as Flight 420 in 1998

== Destinations in 1990 ==
According to a 1990 Intair route map brochure, the airline was serving the following destinations in these Canadian provinces:

New Brunswick

- Charlo
- Chatham
- Moncton

Newfoundland and Labrador

- Wabush/Labrador City

Ontario

- Ottawa
- Toronto - Toronto Pearson International Airport

Quebec

- Alma
- Baie-Comeau
- Baie-Johan-Beetz
- Blanc-Sablon
- Bonaventure
- Chibougamau
- Dolbeau
- Gaspe
- Gatineau/Hull
- Gethsemanie/La Romaine
- Harrington Harbour/Chevery
- Havre-St.-Pierre
- Iles-de-la-Madeleine
- Kegaska
- La Grande
- La Tabatiere
- Montreal - Dorval Airport (now Montreal-Pierre Elliot Trudeau International Airport) - Hub
- Montreal - Mirabel Airport
- Montreal/St.-Hubert
- Natashquan
- Port Menier
- Quebec City - Hub
- Roberval
- Rimouski/Mont-Joli
- Rouyn/Noranda
- Saguenay
- Schefferville/Bagotville
- St.-Augustin
- Sept-Iles - Secondary hub
- Tete-a-La-Baleine
- Val-d'Or

== See also ==
- List of defunct airlines of Canada
