= Sempati Air Flight 304 =

1997 aviation accident

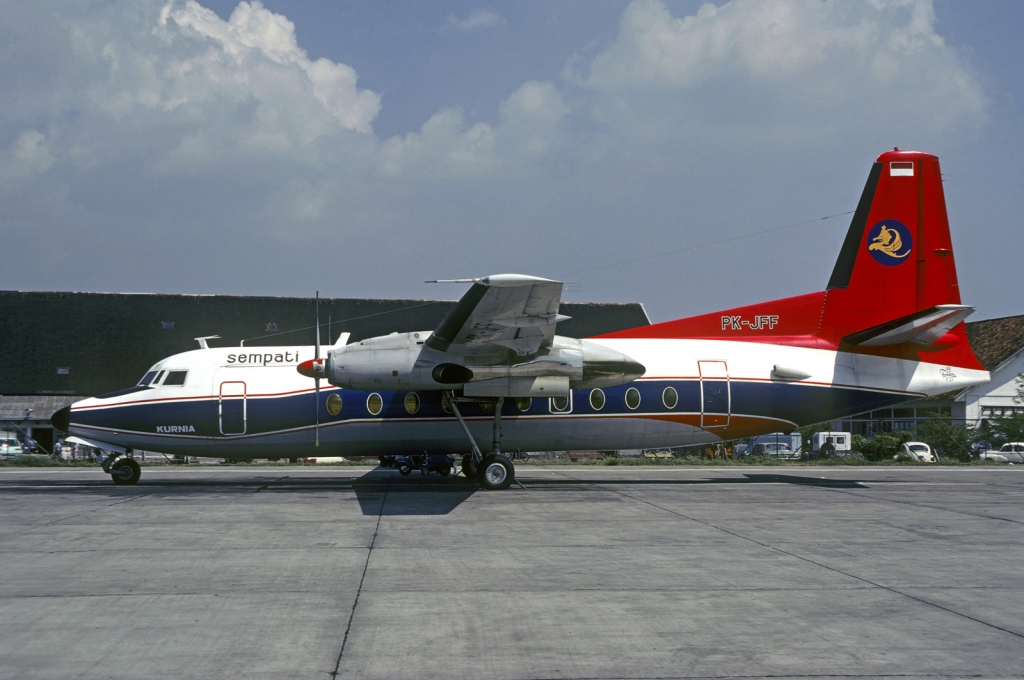
- A Fokker F27 aircraft similar to the accident aircraft

Accident
- Date: 17 July 1997
- Summary: Engine failure on take-off (EFTO), pilot error
- Site: Margahayu, Bandung, West Java, Indonesia

Aircraft
- Aircraft type: Fokker F-27 Friendship 600
- Aircraft name: Jayapura
- Operator: Sempati Air
- Registration: PK-YPM
- Flight origin: Husein Sastranegara International Airport, Bandung, Indonesia
- Destination: Halim Perdanakusuma Airport, Jakarta, Indonesia
- Occupants: 50
- Passengers: 45
- Crew: 5
- Fatalities: 28
- Survivors: 22

Sempati Air Flight 304 (SSR304) was a scheduled domestic passenger flight, flying from Husein Sastranegara International Airport in Bandung, West Java to Halim Perdanakusuma Airport in Jakarta. On 17 July 1997, the aircraft operating the flight, a Fokker F27 Friendship 600 leased from Trigana Air Service, registered PK-YPM, crashed into a densely populated neighbourhood of Margahayu in Bandung after suffering an engine failure shortly after take-off killing 28 of the occupants and injuring several on the ground.

Subsequent investigation by the Indonesian National Transportation Safety Committee found out that the aircraft had suffered an engine failure on its left engine; the pilot failed to execute a proper go-around procedure and crashed into the densely populated residential area of Margahayu.

== Accident ==
The aircraft took off from Husein Sastranegara Airport at 11:46 WIB (04:46 UTC), with Bambang Rudy Santoso as PIC. Approximately 3 minutes after take off, the left engine of the Fokker F27 failed and began spewing thick smoke. The pilot contacted Husein Sastranegara ATC, choosing to land at Sulaiman Airbase runway 13. During the emergency landing procedure, the aircraft clipped houses in Margahayu, Bandung and crashed into a muddy field killing 28 people and severely injuring several people on the ground. Most of the victims were families travelling for school holidays.{cn}

== Aircraft ==
The aircraft involved in the crash was a Fokker F27 Friendship 600 built in 1969 with a serial number of 10415, delivered to Merpati Nusantara Airlines as PK-MHF in 1974. Later, it was sold to Trigana Air Service in 1993 as PK-YPM, Sempati Air in January 1995 and returned to Trigana Air Service in August 1995.

Nationality	Passengers	Crew	Total
Indonesian	42	5	47
Malaysian	1	0	1
Singaporean	2	0	2
Total	45	5	50

1 Malaysian, 2 Singaporean, the rest of the passengers and crew were Indonesian
