= Sempati Air =

Indonesian airline

IATA	ICAO	Call sign
SG (IATA later Transferred to Spicejet)	SSR	SPIROW
- Founded: 16 December 1968
- Commenced operations: March 1969
- Ceased operations: 5 June 1998
- Operating bases: Soekarno-Hatta International Airport; Juanda International Airport
- Hubs: Ngurah Rai International Airport; Sultan Hasanuddin International Airport
- Secondary hubs: Husein Sastranegara International Airport; Achmad Yani Airport; Adisucipto International Airport
- Focus cities: Halim Perdanakusuma International Airport; Polonia International Airport; Singapore Changi Airport
- Frequent-flyer program: Preferred Connection
- Fleet size: 25
- Destinations: 30 (25 Domestic,5 International)
- Headquarters: Jakarta, Indonesia
- Key people: Hasan Soedjono (CEO)

Sempati Air was an airline based in Indonesia. Partially owned by friends and family of President Suharto of Indonesia, the airline ceased operations due to bankruptcy after its owner Suharto's May 1998 presidential resignation. Its IATA code has since been reassigned to SpiceJet.

== History ==
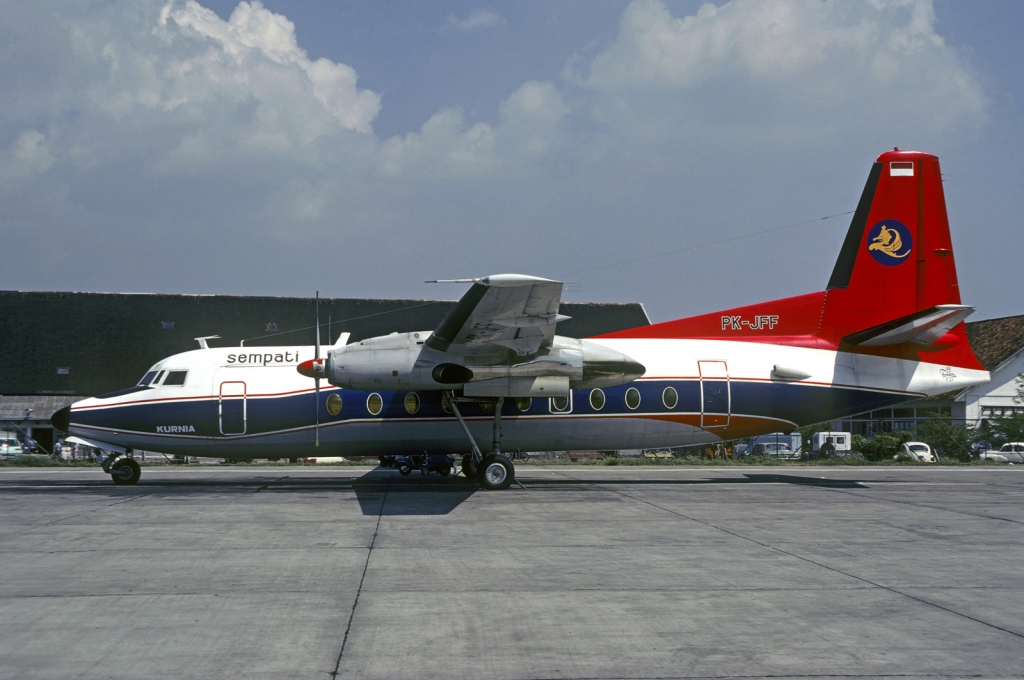
Sempati Air Fokker F-27 at Kemayoran Airport Jakarta in 1978

In 1975, a Boeing 707 was leased from Pelita Air for flights between Denpasar and Tokyo but the route was turned over to Garuda Indonesian Airways (now Garuda Indonesia) by the Indonesian government. After 1977, the DC-3s were phased out in favor of the newer, more modern F27s. After this, the airline was unable to acquire other types of aircraft as the government placed restrictions on private airlines buying new equipment and it was not until the mid-to-late 1980s that the Fokker 100 and the Boeing 737-200 were introduced into the fleet.

In the late 1980s, Tommy Suharto purchased Sempati and distributed it among three investors: Tri Utama Bhakti, Humpuss and Nusantara Ampera Bhakti (Nusamba).

After the buyout, the airline expanded rapidly in the early 1990s. Hasan Soedjono, the CEO of Sempati, planned a five-year leap to achieve the target of becoming one of Southeast Asia's largest airlines after Singapore Airlines, Garuda Indonesia, Malaysia Airlines and Thai Airways International. The airline also had plans to expand into Europe with the introduction of a Jakarta–Abu Dhabi route. In 1993 Sempati Air placed order for a brand new Fokker F-70 and was the launch customer for Fokker F-70 and the plane entry into service within the airline in 1995. Sempati Air Fokker F-70 Aircraft was also equipped with personal televisions in-flight entertainment in all of its cabin seats, making it the first airline in Indonesia to have personal televisions in-flight entertainment in all of its cabin seats and become one of few airlines in the world to introduce personal televisions in-flight entertainment in all of its cabin seats in 1990's.

However, financial difficulties soon plagued the airline. Its expansion plans were ruined as it was unable to buy new aircraft such as the Boeing 767 and some others, while Garuda Indonesia, which originally planned to sell its DC-10s to the airline, is backed out, and instead the airline to eventually purchase Airbus A300 aircraft from Pan Am. With the introduction of the A300, the airline soon began commercial services to new destinations in Asia and Australia.

In 1994, the airline changed its name to Sempati Air. In 1996, just as the airline was planning a share flotation, its debt became known and it was listed in the Red Category, a sign of too much debt. Following continued financial problems, some aircraft were sold or returned to lessors, but it was too late to save the airline and operations ceased in 1998. 7 years later after it ceased operations, the airline filed for bankruptcy in July 2005.

Until 1998, Sempati Air flew to a wide variety of destinations, including Jakarta, Bandung, Semarang, Solo, Yogyakarta, Surabaya, Denpasar, Mataram, Singapore, Kupang, Dili, Medan, Padang, Pekanbaru, Batam, Tanjung Pinang, Palangkaraya, Banjarmasin, Balikpapan, Tarakan, Manado, Palu, Kendari, Makassar, Ambon, Jayapura, Timika, and Perth (Western Australia).

== Incidents and accidents ==
- On 5 June 1991, a Sempati Fokker F27, registered as PK-JFF crashed in Surabaya when used on a training flight. This flight did not carry any passengers.
- On 16 January 1995, a Sempati Air Boeing 737-200, registered as PK-JHF with Nosename "Pink Rose", experienced a skid at Adisucipto International Airport. There were no fatalities in this accident, although the plane was written off and scrapped.
- On 17 July 1997, Sempati Air Flight 304, a Fokker F27 leased from Trigana Air Service crashed into a densely populated neighborhood of Margahayu shortly after takeoff from Bandung's Husein Sastranegara International Airport. A total of 28 people were killed. The pilot lost stability after one of the aircraft's engines failed.
