= Inter Airlines =

Turkish charter airline

IATA	ICAO	Call sign
6K	INX	INTER-EURO
- Founded: 17 December 1999
- Ceased operations: 18 November 2008
- Hubs: Antalya Airport
- Fleet size: 5
- Destinations: 34
- Headquarters: Antalya, Turkey
- Key people: Ömer Torosluoğlu (CEO)
- Website: http://www.interekspres.com

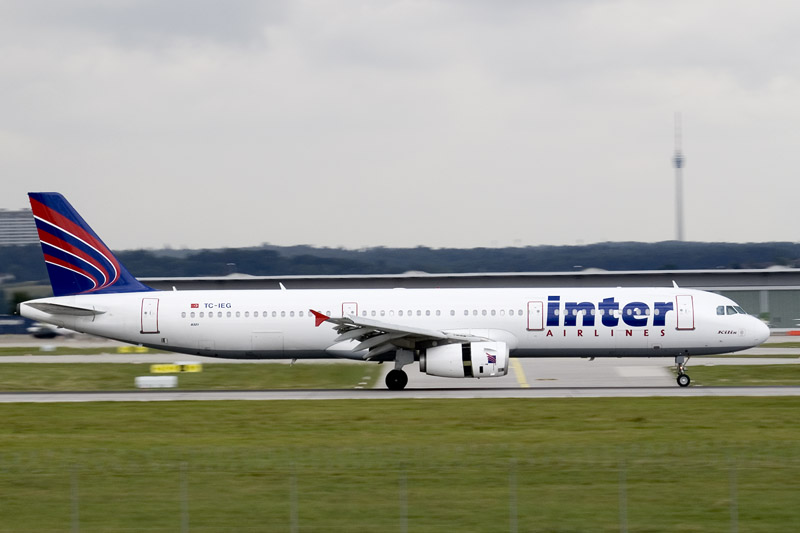
Inter Airlines Airbus A321

Inter Airlines was a charter airline based in Antalya, Turkey. It operated holiday charter flights from Belgium, Germany and the Netherlands to Turkish resorts, as well as wet lease services for other airlines. Its main base was Antalya Airport.

Inter Airlines hold Jar-Ops 1 Air Operator Certificate and Jar-145 Maintenance Certificate issued by Republic Of Turkey Directorate General Of Civil Aviation, a member of the Joint Aviation Authorities (JAA).

== History ==
The airline was established in December 1999 and operations started on 4 April 2002. It was wholly owned by Birce Tours and had 200 employees (at March 2007).

On 13 November 2008, the airline stopped all flights, citing the 2008 financial crisis and increasing fuel prices as the two main reasons. All 3 aircraft were returned to their lessors. The company may possibly resurface as a tour operator.

== Retired fleet ==
The Inter Airlines fleet included the following aircraft (as of 11 September 2008):

- 3 Airbus A321-231

== Before bankruptcy ==
The airline also operated these aircraft before going bankrupt:

- 3 Fokker 100
- 2 Boeing 737-800
