= Fokker 100 =

Twin-engine airliner produced 1986–1997

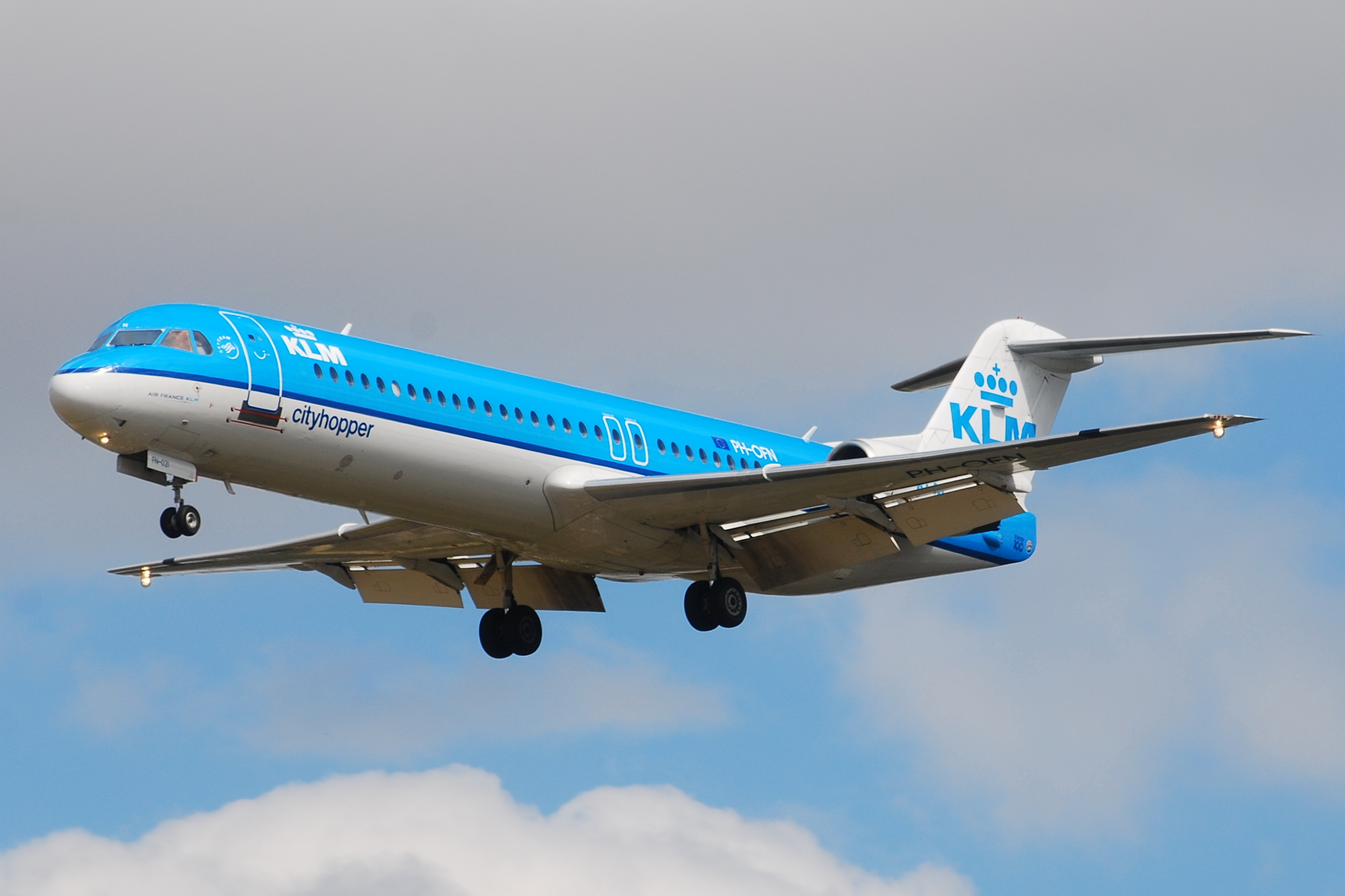
- KLM Cityhopper Fokker 100

General information
- Type: Regional jet
- National origin: Netherlands
- Manufacturer: Fokker
- Status: In service
- Primary users: Alliance Airlines QantasLink (Network Aviation); Iran Aseman Airlines
- Number built: 283 (+2 prototypes)

History
- Manufactured: 1986–1997
- Introduction date: 3 April 1988 with Swissair
- First flight: 30 November 1986
- Developed from: Fokker F28 Fellowship
- Developed into: Fokker 70

The Fokker 100 is a regional jet that was produced by Fokker in the Netherlands. The Fokker 100 was based on the Fokker F28 with a fuselage stretched by 5.7 m (18.8 ft) to seat up to 109 passengers, up from 85. It is powered by two newer Rolls-Royce Tay turbofans, and it has an updated glass cockpit and a wider wing and tail for increased maximum weights. The Fokker 70 is a shortened variant that can seat up to 85 passengers and was developed for shorter routes, which first flew in April of 1993.

The program was announced in 1983, and it made its maiden flight on 30 November 1986. The variant was approved on 20 November 1987, and first deliveries to Swissair started in February 1988. American Airlines ordered 75, TAM Transportes Aéreos Regionais ordered 50, and USAir got 40. However, Fokker had financial troubles and went bankrupt in March 1996, ending production in 1997 after 283 deliveries. Amsterdam-based Rekkof group wants to restart its production and update it with new engines but has not reached its goal.

Since the 2000s, airlines have been retiring the aircraft, but large numbers remain in operation in Australia, with smaller numbers in Iran and various other countries. As of May 11th, 2024, there are 66 aircraft in service around the world.

== Design ==
The F28 Mark 0100, "Fokker 100", is based on the Fokker F28 Mark 4000 re-engined with two Rolls-Royce RB.183 Tay high bypass-ratio turbofans and a fuselage stretched by 5.74 m (18.83 ft). Its wing is wider by 3.0 m (9.8 ft), has new flaps and larger ailerons, and its extended leading and trailing edges improve aerodynamics and increase the wing chord. The landing gear is strengthened and has new wheels and brakes, and the horizontal stabilizer is widened by 1.4 m (4.6 ft). Maximum weights are increased, while fuel capacity, maximum speed, and ceiling remain the same, and passenger capacity went from 85 to 109. The flight deck went digital with a flight management system, an autopilot/flight director including CAT III autoland, thrust management system, electronic flight instrument displays, and full ARINC avionics.

The new wing was claimed to be 30% more efficient in cruise, while retaining the simplicity of a fixed leading edge. The cockpit was updated with a Rockwell Collins DU-1000 electronic flight instrument system. The Fokker 100 retained the twin rear fuselage-mounted engines and T-tail configuration of the Fokker Fellowship, like the Douglas DC-9 family. The F100 lacks the auxiliary overhead windows above the cockpit wind shields of the F28.

== Development ==
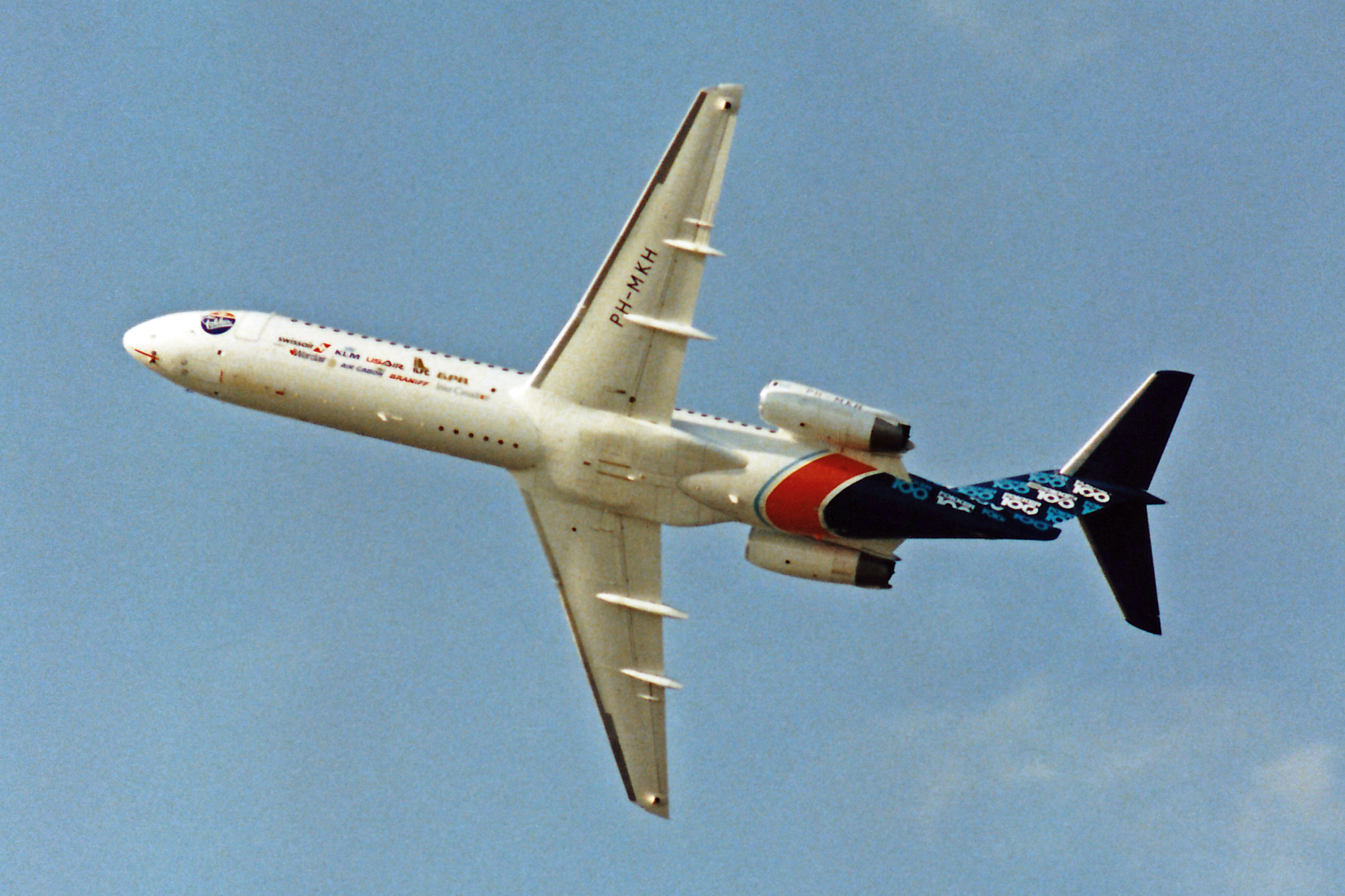
The Fokker 100 prototype, from below

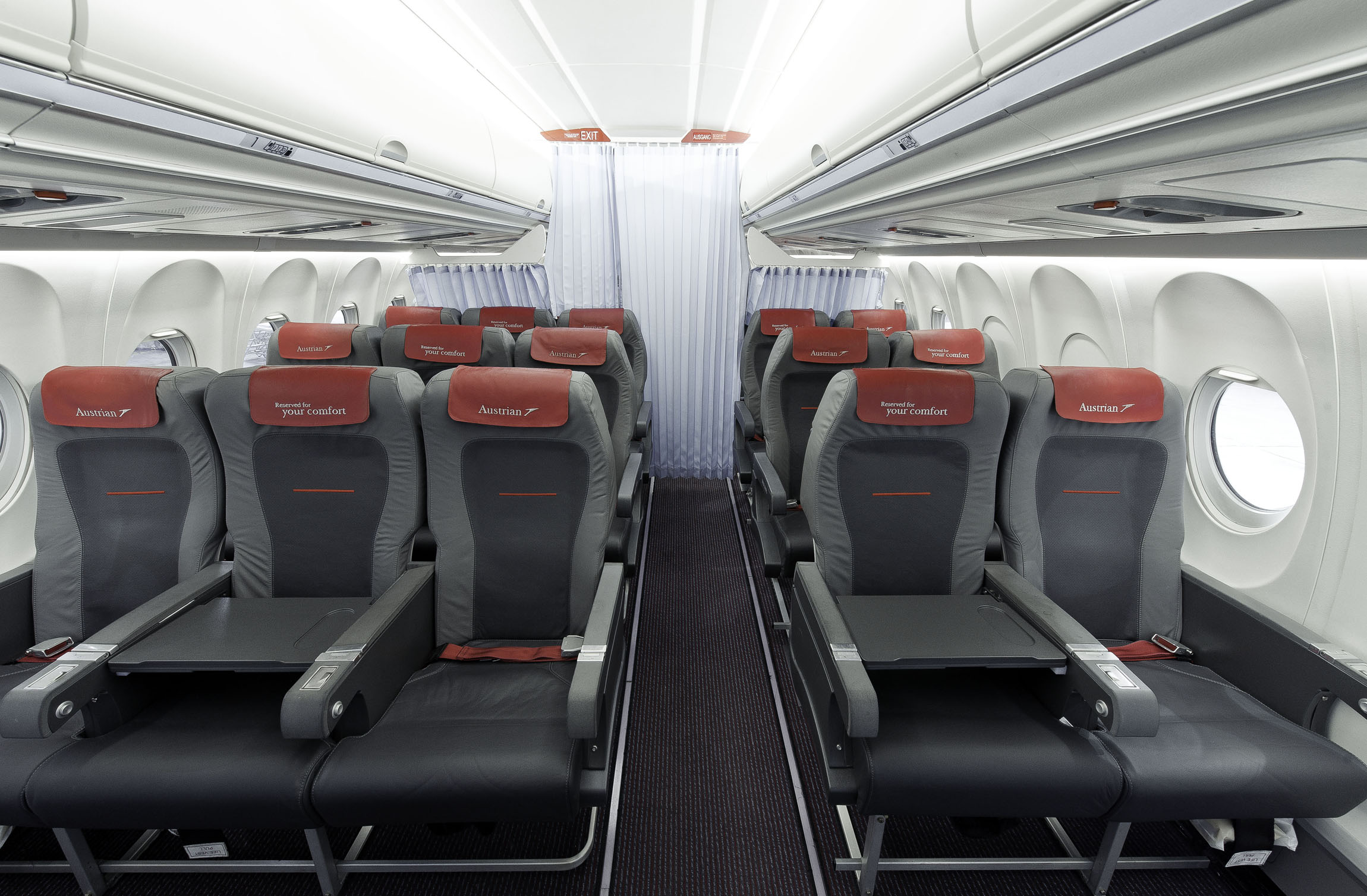
The five-abreast cabin seating, used by Austrian Airlines

A type certificate was applied for on 25 March 1983. The program was announced in 1983 and a pair of prototypes were constructed. On 30 November 1986, the first prototype, PH-MKH, flew for the first time, while the second, PH-MKC, followed on 25 February 1987.

The variant was approved on 20 November 1987. In February 1988, the first deliveries of the Tay 620-15-powered versions started to Swissair. Major customers included American Airlines with 75 ordered, TAM Transportes Aéreos Regionais with 50, and USAir with 40, their aircraft powered by the more powerful Tay 650-15. The March 1989 American Airlines order, valued at an estimated US$3.1 billion (equivalent to $8.05 billion in 2025), was not only the largest single order ever placed at Fokker, but also the largest-ever order for a Dutch company.

During the early 1990s, Fokker and DASA explored a commercial relationship for regional aircraft. DASA purchased 40% of Fokker in 1993. By 1995, though, both Fokker and DASA were suffering financial difficulties, leading to DASA leaving the regional aircraft market. In June 1996, DASA sold the majority of Dornier to Fairchild Aircraft, leading to the creation of Fairchild Dornier, emerging as the third-largest regional aircraft manufacturer.

Although the Fokker 100 was successful, Fokker accumulated losses for several years, contributing to its collapse in 1996. Fokker 100 production stopped in early 1997.

=== Potential revival ===
Discussions regarding the potential for either portions or the entirety of Fokker being purchased by Bombardier Inc. are known to have taken place, but talks ultimately fell through without a deal being reached. Dutch firm Stork B.V. has since acquired the maintenance business for the type and has since been providing services to existing operators, having adopted the name Fokker Aviation. Like any number of regional airliner designs, the Fokker 70/100 was being increasingly squeezed from below by stretched versions of the Bombardier and Embraer regional jets; this intense competitive pressure had also been responsible for killing off plans for the Fairchild Dornier 728 family, along with an unnamed design being considered by ATR. At one point, a proposal was made for a stretched version of the Fokker 100, known as the Fokker 130, however this was never built.

In 1999, an Amsterdam-based group, Rekkof Restart (Rekkof is Fokker spelled backwards), announced it had entered into negotiations with the intention of reopening both the Fokker 70 and 100 lines. During the 2000s, the Netherlands Aircraft Company (otherwise known as NG Aircraft) was formed for the purpose of restarting production, although the ambition has suffered some delays, including some false starts. In March 2010, NG Aircraft stated that it had securing funding from the Ministry of Economic Affairs to adapt an existing Fokker 100 to serve as a prototype for a planned improved new-build series; that same month, the company announced its interest in converting existing aircraft to a proposed new-build equivalent standard, in addition to its primary focus of constructing wholly new Fokker 100s. In March 2011, it was announced that the government of Brazil had formed a partnership for the revival of the Fokker 100.

In July 2014, Maarten Van Eeghen, chief executive of NG Aircraft, revealed more details about the pending revival and the new generation of aircraft that would be produced. Dubbed the F120NG, it would be a new-build aircraft, seating a maximum of 125 to 130 passengers, that would be essentially a stretched model of the base Fokker 100. It would adopt a new powerplant, the Pratt & Whitney PurePower PW1X17G turbofan engine rated at 17,600 lb thrust, which is claimed to result in the new-generation airliner burning 50% less fuel per seat than the original Fokker 100. It was claimed in 2014 that the earliest entry-to-service date for the F120NG would have been 2019, based on a five-year development and testing programme after obtaining official clearance to proceed.

== Operational history ==
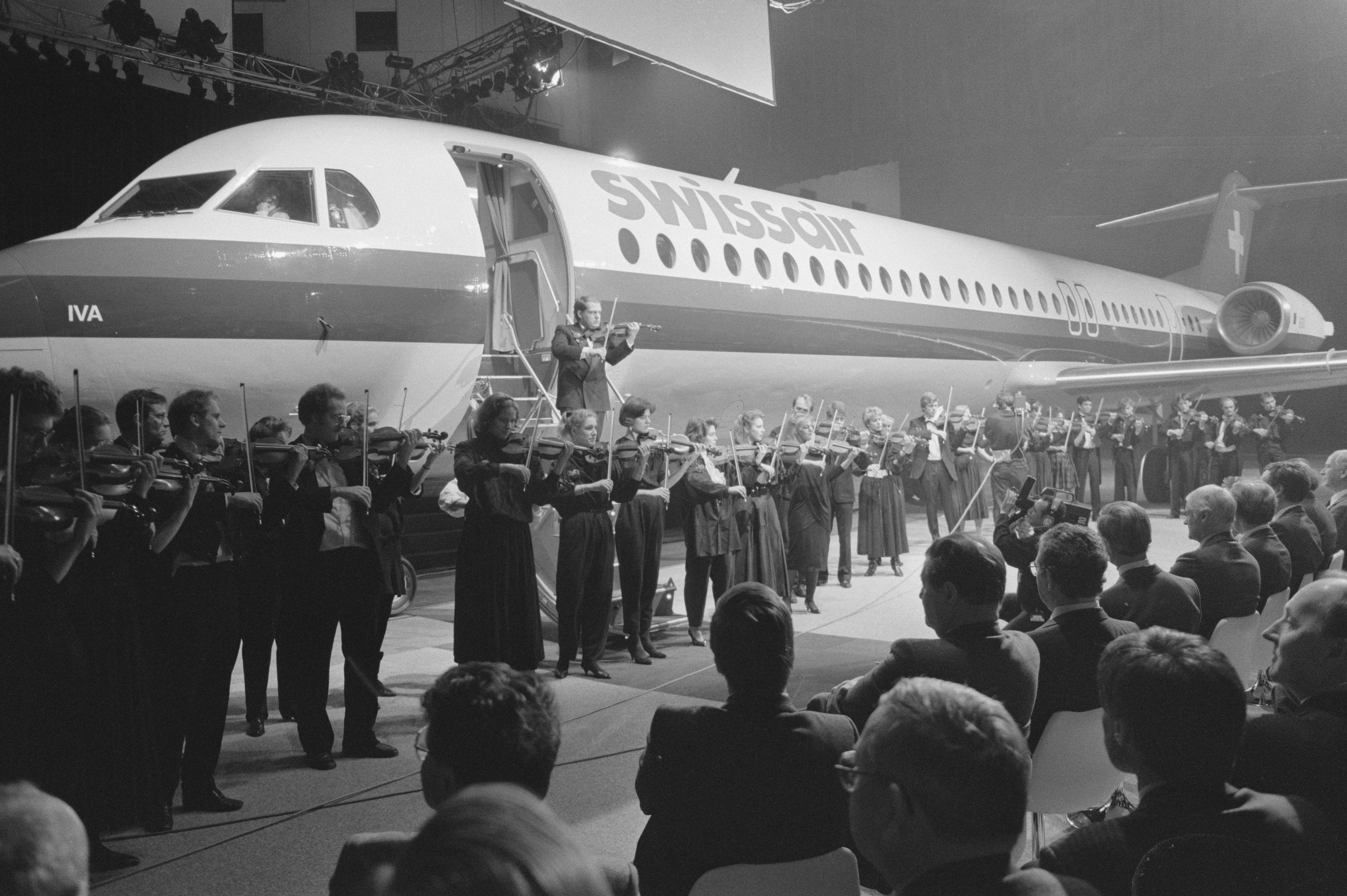
The first delivery, to Swissair, on 29 February 1988

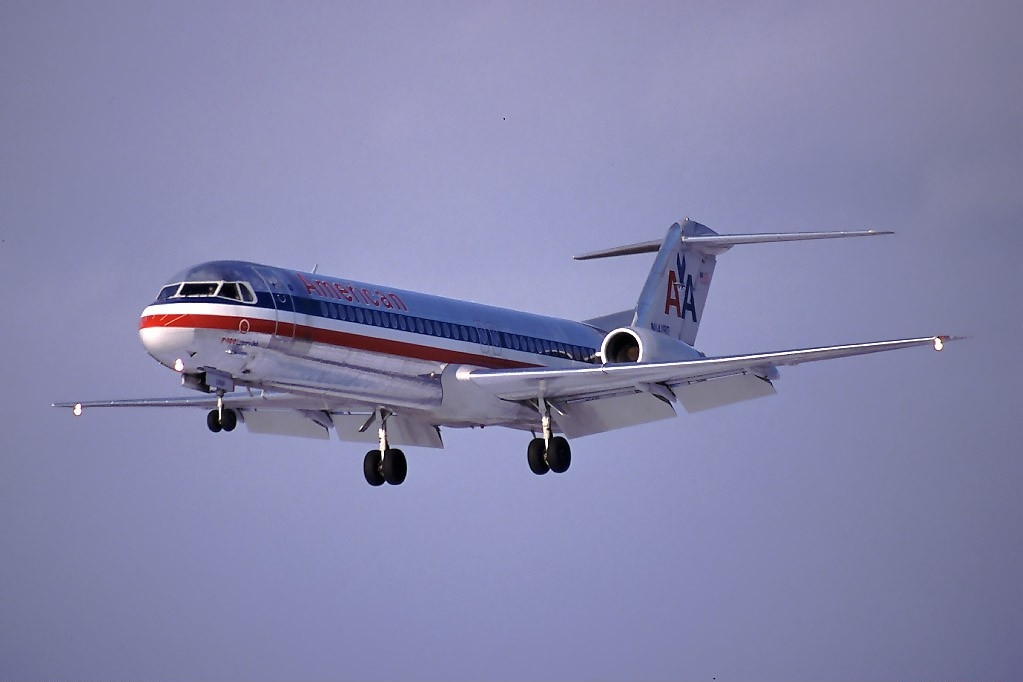
A former Fokker 100 of American Airlines.

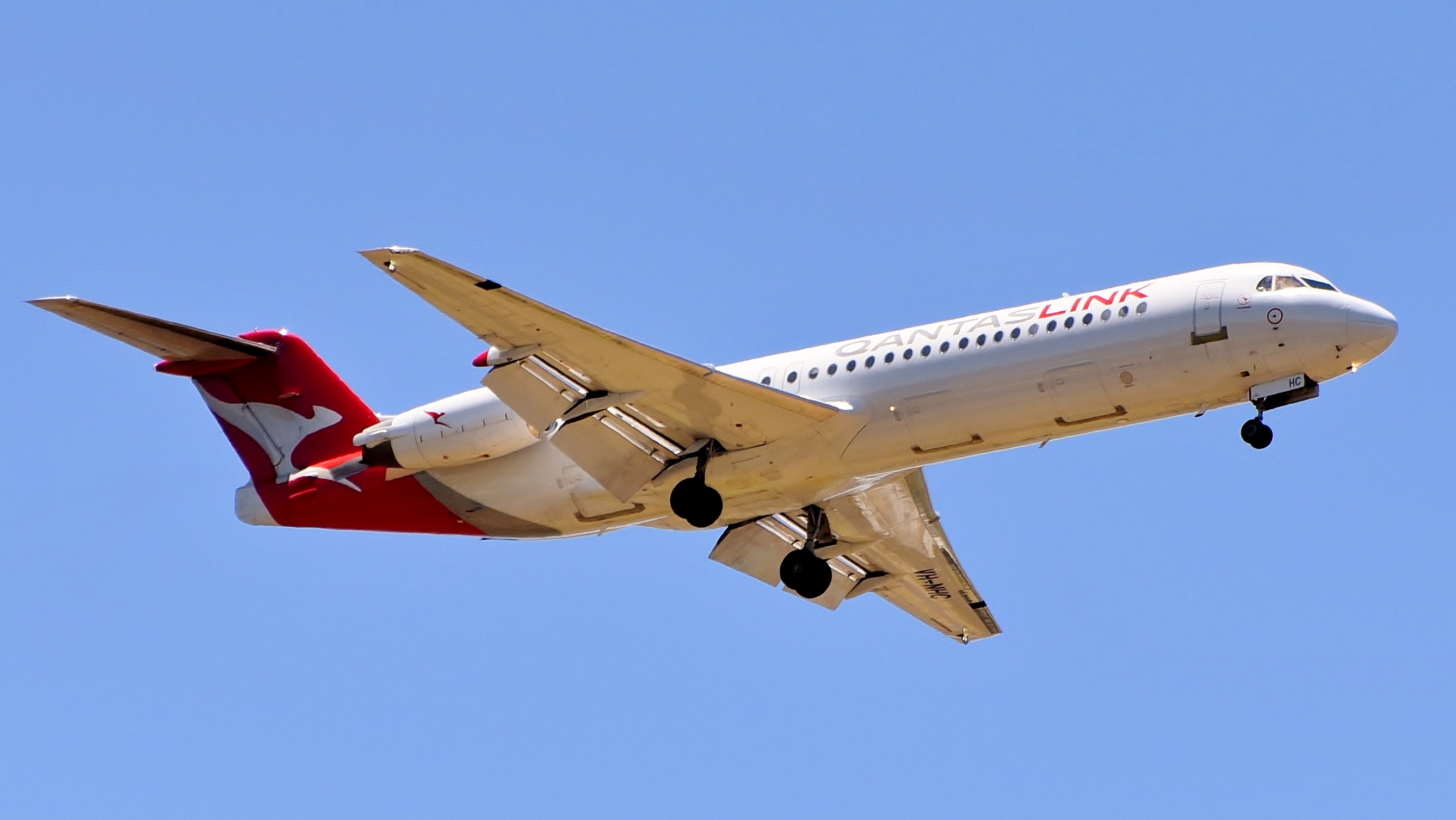
A still operated QantasLink Fokker 100.

By 1991, Fokker had produced 70 units and had orders for more than 230. The aircraft joined the American Airlines fleet in August 1991. In 1993, an extended-range version of the Fokker 100, outfitted with additional fuel tanks in the centre fuselage, was introduced; it was followed by a quick-change passenger/freighter version in 1994, designated as the Fokker 100QC. In 1993, a shortened version of the airliner was introduced, designated as the Fokker 70; this aircraft was intended as a replacement for the earlier Fokker F28 and featured the removal of 4.70 m (15.42 ft) of the fuselage and reduced seating to 80. Third-party aircraft companies, such as Phoenix Aero Solutions, have since offered their conversion programs to produce freighters from former airliner-configuration Fokker 100s. While studies were conducted on a proposed 130-seat Fokker 130, this proposal ultimately did not reach further stages of development.

In 2000, to counter upstart Legend Airlines, American refitted five Fokker 100s in a 56-seat all-business class configuration to circumvent Wright Amendment long-haul flight restrictions from Dallas Love Field. The airline later added a sixth 56-seat Fokker, but after the September 11 attacks, the Love Field service was cancelled and these aircraft were grounded. In late 2002, American Airlines decided to retire its entire 74-aircraft fleet early, citing high operating costs; the jets would be phased out in 2004 and replaced with smaller, but more economical regional jets operated by its American Eagle regional affiliates.

In 2003, a Fokker 100EJ (Executive Jet) variant was introduced; these were remanufactured aircraft produced by Fokker Services as conversions from used Fokker 100 airliners. Priced around $12 million, the Fokker 100EJ seated between 19 and 31 passengers in three different luxury configurations, all of which featured galleys, while two were outfitted with shower-equipped master suites; additional features include an auxiliary fuel system to extend the aircraft's range by roughly 1,600 km (990 mi). By late 2009, a total of six Fokker 100s were in VIP service, while a further two were used in a 50-seat corporate layout.

The Great Recession in the late 2000s prompted airlines to retire the Fokker 100 in large numbers; some later returned to operations, while a considerable portion were broken up, instead. In March 2009, Mexicana announced that the confirmation of an agreement with Boeing to lease 25 Boeing 717s as a replacement for its fleet of 25 Fokker 100s. In September 2009, one of the last Asian operators of the type, Mandarin Airlines, phased out the last of its Fokker 100s. According to maintenance and servicing company Fokker Services, Fokker 100 airliners constructed during the 1990s had been anticipated to be serviceable until 2035, while the type was expected to remain competitive without modification until at least 2020.

In August 2009, Australian airline Skywest Airlines announced that it would be outfitting its fleet of Fokker 100 and Fokker 70 aircraft with a new satellite navigation system; these had the advantage of enabling shorter approaches at night and in bad weather, saving time and fuel, and increasing safety and schedule reliability, as well as increasing the number of airports usable by the type.

From 2015, the French DGA Essais en Vol had used the Fokker 100 as a flying testbed; it is referred to as the ABE-NG, standing for Avion Banc-d'Essais de Nouvelle Génération. It has replaced the DGA's previous testbed of choice, the Dassault Falcon 20 business jet, and has been outfitted with various systems of the Dassault Rafale fighter aircraft for testing purposes, including the Rafale's nose section, Thales RBE2 active electronically scanned array radar and optronics equipment, and Reco NG targeting pod under the fuselage and a complement of MBDA Mica air-to-air missiles. The first aircraft, which was formerly used by Régional, is to be followed by four more used Fokker 100s.

In June 2015, Austrian Airlines, then one of the largest operators of the Fokker 100, announced its approval of a plan to procure used Embraer 195 regional jets to replace its inventory of Fokker 100 and Fokker 70 jets, which had an average age of 21 years across the fleet. In November 2015, Alliance Airlines announced that it would acquire the entire Austrian Airlines Fokker fleet of fifteen Fokker 100 and six Fokker 70 airliners.

Shortly after the crash of Bek Air Flight 2100 on 27 December 2019, the Government of Kazakhstan indefinitely suspended Fokker 100 operations in Kazakh airspace. On 17 April 2020, citing the airline's failure to correct the safety violations discovered during the investigation, the Aviation Administration of Kazakhstan (AAK) recalled the company's air operator's certificate and the airworthiness certificates of its remaining Fokker 100 aircraft.

As of February 13th, 2026, QantasLink (Network Aviation) is in the process of retiring their fleet of Fokker 100s with some already retired, including VH-NHO which was donated to HARS Aviation Museum in Parkes, NSW.

== Operators ==
=== Current operators ===
==== Airlines ====
As of August 2019, 126 aircraft were still in operational use with airlines. Many of them are used in Australia by Alliance Airlines and QantasLink supporting the domestic mining industry, with low use rates for an airline, around 1,200 hours per year.

- Air Niugini (5)
- Alliance Airlines (25)
- Iran Air (3)
- Iran Aseman Airlines (7)
- Jetways Airlines (1)
- Karun Airlines (5)
- Kish Air (2)
- QantasLink (Network Aviation) (16)
- Qeshm Air (4)
- Skippers Aviation (2)

==== Governments ====
- French government (1)
- Slovak government (2)

=== Former operators ===
- Aero Mongolia
- Air Bagan
- Air Berlin (Lease from Germania)
- Air Europe
- Air Express Sweden
- Air France
- Air Gabon
- Air Greece
- Air Inter
- Air Littoral
- Air Panama
- AirQuarius Aviation
- AirUK
- Alpi Eagles
- American Airlines
- Albanian Airlines
- Albatros Airways
- Austrian Airlines
- Avanti Air
- Aviacsa
- Avianca
- Avianca Brasil
- Bangkok Airways
- Bek Air
- Blue Line
- BMI
- Brit Air
- Canadian North
- Carpatair
- China Eastern Airlines
- CCM Airlines
- Contact Air
- Cosmic Air
- Croatia Airlines
- DBA
- Dutch Antilles Express
- EUjet
- Flight West
- Germania
- Girjet
- Greenland Express
- Helvetic Airways
- Intair
- Inter Airlines
- Inter-Canadien
- Jetairfly
- Jetsgo
- KLM Cityhopper
- KLM uk
- Korean Air
- Kostar Airlines
- Mandarin Airlines
- Merpati Nusantara Airlines
- Mexicana
- Midway Airlines
- Moldavian Airlines
- Montenegro Airlines
- OLT Jetair
- Palair
- PGA Portugália Airlines
- Régional
- Royal Brunei Airlines
- Royal Swazi National Airlines
- SAM Colombia
- Sempati Air
- Sky Greenland
- Slovak Airlines
- Sol del Paraguay
- Swissair
- TABA
- TAM Airlines
- TAM Paraguay
- Trade Air
- Transwede
- Transwisata Prima Aviation
- TAT European Airlines
- Tus Airways
- Tyrolean Airways (operating under Austrian Arrows brand on behalf of Austrian)
- Uair
- US Airways
- Virgin Australia Regional Airlines
- Wayraperú
- Yeongnam Air

== Accidents and incidents ==
- 5 March 1993: Palair Macedonian Airlines Flight 301 crashed shortly after takeoff from Skopje Airport on its way to Zurich Airport, killing 83 of 97 passengers and crew on board.
- 31 October 1996: TAM Transportes Aéreos Regionais Flight 402 crashed shortly after takeoff from São Paulo-Congonhas Airport in Brazil, killing 99 people, including everyone on board plus four people on the ground.
- 9 July 1997: TAM Airlines Flight 283, PT-WHK, en route from São José dos Campos to São Paulo-Congonhas was climbing after takeoff from São José dos Campos when a bomb exploded in the rear part of the passenger cabin. The uncontrolled decompression blew one passenger out of the aircraft. The aircraft made a successful emergency landing in São Paulo, despite the 2 m × 1.5 m (6.6 ft × 4.9 ft) hole in the fuselage.
- 23 May 2001: The starboard main landing gear of American Airlines Flight 1107, N1419D, collapsed on landing at Dallas/Fort Worth International Airport. The incident was attributed to a manufacturing flaw; there were no serious injuries to the 88 passengers or 4 crew, but the aircraft was badly damaged and was written off.
- 15 September 2001: TAM Flight 9755, flying from Recife to Campinas-Viracopos on a charter flight, had three cabin windows shattered by an uncontained engine failure and made an emergency landing at Belo Horizonte-Confins. One passenger, who was sucked partway out and held by another passenger until the aircraft landed, did not survive.
- 25 January 2007: Air France Flight 7775 from Pau to Paris crashed shortly after takeoff. All 54 passengers and crew escaped from the aircraft, although one person on the ground was killed. An investigation by the BEA attributed the accident to ice on the wings.
- 29 June 2007: An Ivorian government Fokker 100 carrying Prime Minister Guillaume Soro, members of his delegation, and 20 journalists was taxiing on the runway at Bouaké Airport when it was targeted by rocket and Kalashnikov fire. One rocket struck and exploded in the cabin, another one missed, and a third bounced off the fuselage and did not detonate. Soro was not injured, but four people were killed and ten others wounded. Those who died were Security Chief Drissa Ouattara, the Prime Minister's bodyguard Siaka Diomandé, and Protocole d’État members Sékou Doumbia and Souleymane Sérifou. Arrests were subsequently reported.
- 3 January 2008: An Iran Air domestic flight from Tehran to Shiraz was heavily damaged when it veered off the runway during its takeoff run. The aircraft suffered substantial fire damage after part of its wing burst into flame; there were no injuries as a result.
- 25 December 2012: Air Bagan Flight 11 touched down short of the runway at Heho Airport, impacting trees and power lines, killing one on board and one on the ground, and injuring 11.
- 18 February 2013: In the Brussels Airport diamond heist, a Fokker 100 operated by Helvetic Airways was robbed by eight gunmen who entered the apron in vehicles disguised as police cars and stole approximately US $50 million in diamonds and money that was being loaded into the aircraft from an armoured car. The thieves escaped without any shots being fired.
- 27 December 2019: Bek Air Flight 2100 lost altitude on takeoff from Almaty International Airport and struck a nearby concrete barrier and a building. Of 93 passengers and 5 crew, 53 were hospitalized and 12 were killed, including the captain. The accident was attributed to a stall caused by ice buildup on the wings; contributing factors were the pilots' failure to inspect the aircraft for ice, poor airline safety standards, and the presence of a building only 10 m (33 ft) from the airport perimeter fence.

== Aircraft on display ==
Netherlands

- 11260 – Fokker 100 registered PH-OFE, a former KLM Cityhopper aircraft, is preserved as a highly prominent interactive public exhibit mounted on the roof of the Panorama Terrace at Amsterdam Airport Schiphol, Netherlands. The fuselage interior remains fully open to visitors for walk-through simulator and cockpit tours.

Australia

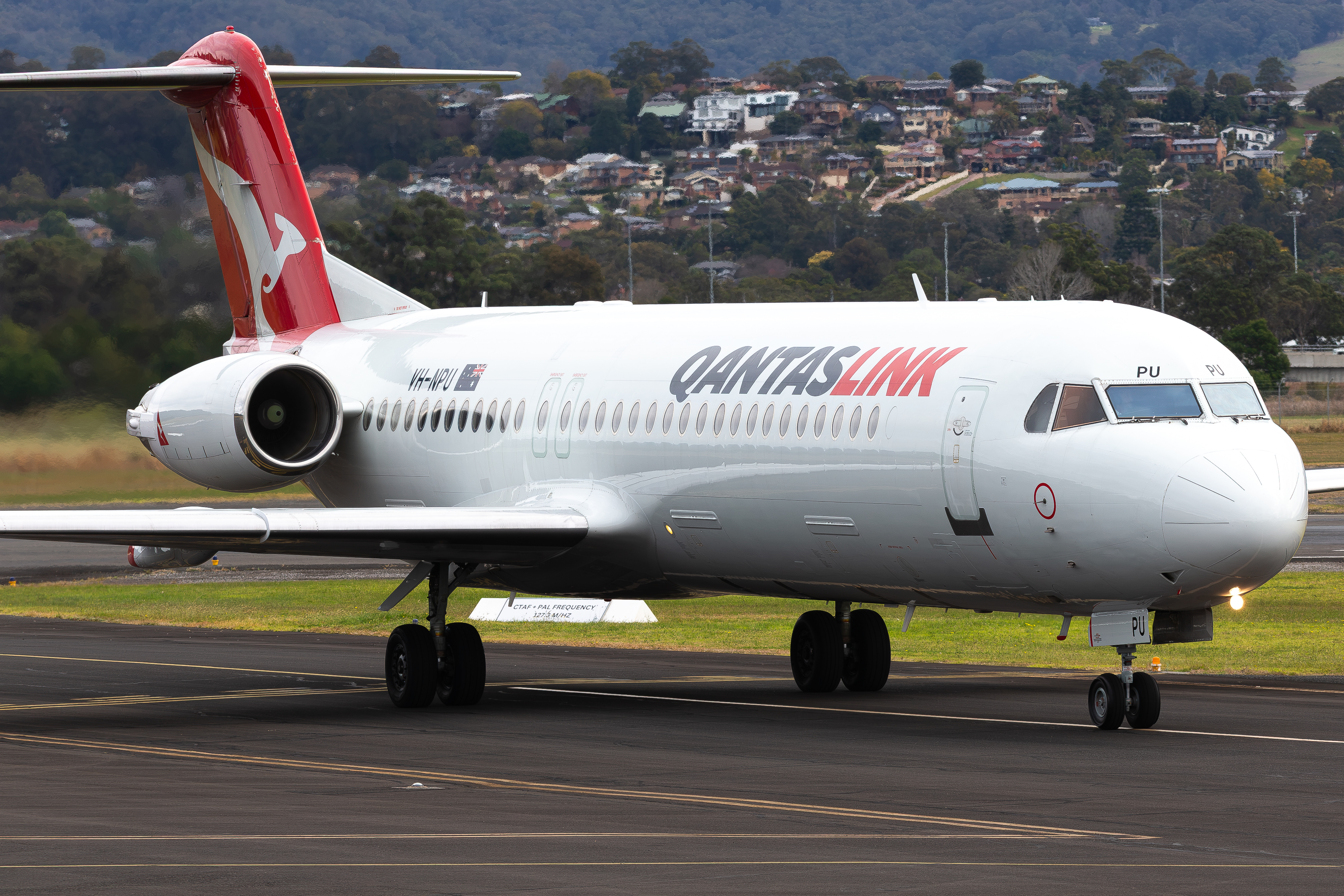
- VH-NPU arriving at the Historical Aircraft Restoration Society for display, 2026.
  11312 – Fokker 100, registered VH-NHO, a former Network Aviation aircraft was donated to the Historical Aircraft Restoration Society by Qantas for display at the organisation's Parkes museum. The aircraft is significant as it was the first Fokker 100 to be delivered to Network Aviation in 2008.
- 11502 – Fokker 100, registered VH-NPU, another former Network Aviation aircraft operated for QantasLink was donated to the Historical Aircraft Restoration Society by Qantas for display at the organisation's Albion Park museum.

China

- 11379 – Fokker 100 registered B-2231, the very first Fokker 100 delivered to China Eastern Airlines in 1992, marking the initial entry of the type into the Chinese civil aviation market, is preserved and displayed as an educational instructional airframe and ground monument.

== Specifications ==
Fokker 100
| Cockpit crew | Two | |
| Seating | 97 in 2-class to 122 max. | |
| Seat pitch | min. 74 cm (29 in) to 1st class 91 cm (36 in) | |
| Length | 35.53 m (116 ft 7 in) | |
| Wing | 28.08 m (92 ft 2 in) span 93.5 m^{2} (1,006 sq ft) area | |
| Height | 8.50 m (27 ft 11 in); 2.01 m (6 ft 7 in) cabin | |
| Width | 3.30 m (10 ft 10 in) fuselage 3.10 m (10 ft 2 in) cabin | |
| Empty weight | 24,375 kg (53,738 lb) | 24,541 kg (54,104 lb) |
| MTOW | 43,090 kg (95,000 lb) | 45,810 kg (100,990 lb) |
| Max. payload | 11,242 kg (24,784 lb) | 11,993 kg (26,440 lb) |
| Fuel capacity | 13,365 L (2,940 imp gal; 3,531 US gal) | |
| Turbofans (2x) | R-R Tay Mk 620-15 | R-R Tay Mk 650-15 |
| Unit thrust | 61.6 kN (13,850 lb_{f}) | 67 kN (15,100 lb_{f}) |
| Max. cruise | 845 km/h (525 mph; 456 kn); Mach 0.77 | |
| Range (max. PL) | 1,323 nmi (1,522 mi; 2,450 km) | 1,710 nmi (1,970 mi; 3,170 km) |
| Take-off (MTOW) | 1,520 m (4,988 ft) | 1,621 m (5,319 ft) |
| Service ceiling | 11,000 m (35,000 ft) | |

== See also ==
Related development

- Fokker 70

Aircraft of comparable role, configuration, and era

- Airbus A318
- British Aerospace 146
- Boeing 717 (MD-95)
- Bombardier CRJ700 series
- Embraer E-190/195
- Fairchild Dornier 728 family
- McDonnell Douglas MD-80
- Sukhoi Superjet 100
- Tupolev Tu-334

Related lists

- List of jet airliners
- List of civil aircraft
