= St. Martin's Cathedral (Gander) =

Cathedral in Gander, Canada

Coordinates: 48.9583°N 54.6157°W

St. Martin's Cathedral is a pro-cathedral of the Diocese of Central Newfoundland, a diocese of the Anglican Church of Canada, in Gander, Newfoundland and Labrador. St. Martin's was established as a parish church in 1959 and was elevated as a pro-cathedral after Gander became the episcopal see of the diocese after it, the Diocese of Western Newfoundland, and the Diocese of Eastern Newfoundland and Labrador were split from the former Diocese of Newfoundland in 1976. The current dean of the cathedral is David Hewitt. The cathedral hosts ordinations and the diocesan synods.

== Description and history ==
A plaque in the cathedral commemorates three crewmen whose bodies were not recovered following a 1943 crash of a Royal Canadian Air Force B-24 Liberator into Gander Lake. In August 1985, Robert Runcie, the then-Archbishop of Canterbury, arrived in Gander unannounced before starting a 18-day tour of Canada. He was greeted by officials from the cathedral. Runcie's sermon at St. Martin's was his first major event of the tour.

The interfaith memorial service for the 256 U.S. Army soldiers killed on Arrow Air Flight 1285R was held in St. Martin's Pro-Cathedral on 15 December 1985, drawing between 600 and 900 people. A 25th anniversary memorial service was held at the cathedral in 2010.

The diocese's first youth synod was held in 2003, including services at the cathedral. Bruce Stavert, the Bishop of Quebec, was elected as the metropolitan bishop of the Ecclesiastical Province of Canada in 2004 at St. Martin's. David Torraville, former rector of the parish in Gander and the cathedral, was elected as Bishop of Central Newfoundland in 2005. When Claude Miller, the Bishop of Central Newfoundland, became the Metropolitan of Canada in 2009, he signed his oath in St. Martin's. In 2016, the cathedral's rector John Watton was elected bishop of the Diocese of Central Newfoundland. The diocese credits Watton's rectorate with making St. Martin's among the fastest-growing Anglican parish communities in Canada.
