= Continental Airlines Flight 1713 =

1987 aviation accident in Colorado

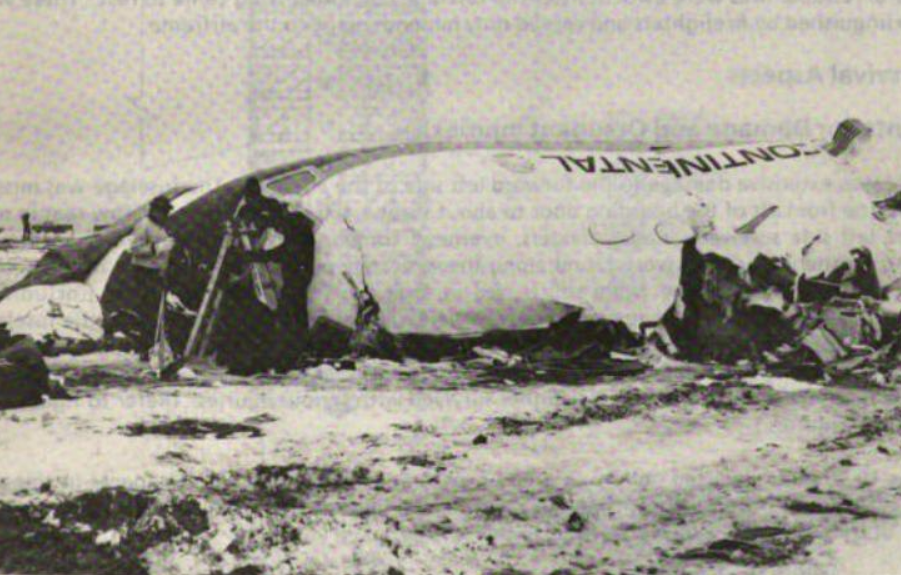
- Wreckage of the aircraft's forward section

Accident
- Date: November 15, 1987
- Summary: Crashed following loss of control on takeoff
- Site: Stapleton International Airport, Denver, Colorado, United States; 39°46′28″N 104°53′45″W

Aircraft
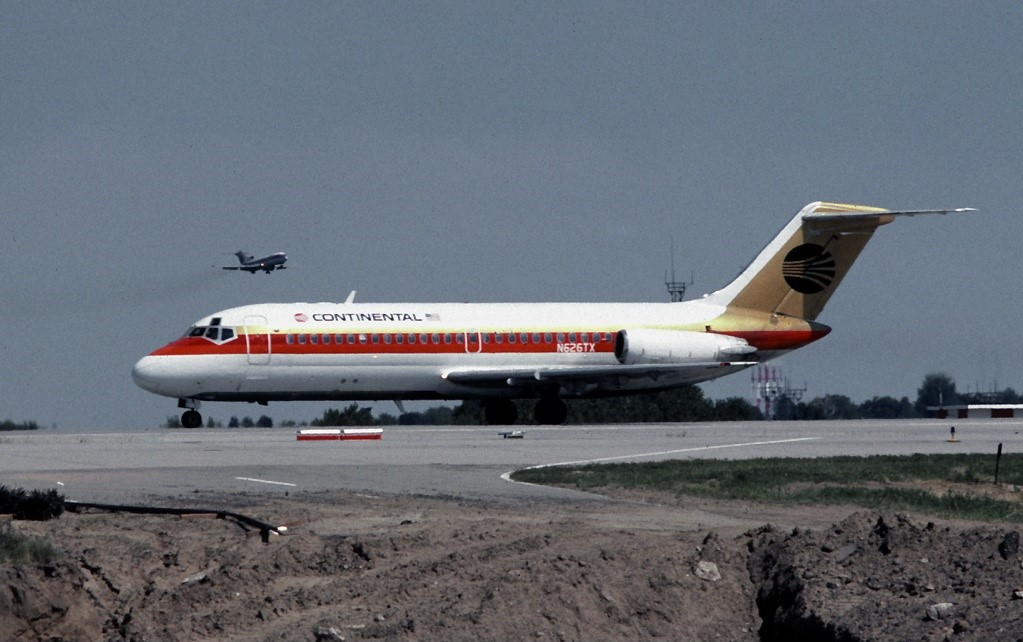
- N626TX, the aircraft involved in the accident, seen in 1985
- Aircraft type: Douglas DC-9-14
- Operator: Continental Airlines
- IATA flight No.: CO1713
- ICAO flight No.: COA1713
- Call sign: CONTINENTAL 1713
- Registration: N626TX
- Flight origin: Stapleton International Airport
- Destination: Boise Airport
- Occupants: 82
- Passengers: 77
- Crew: 5
- Fatalities: 28
- Injuries: 53
- Survivors: 54

Continental Airlines Flight 1713 was a commercial airline flight that crashed while taking off in a snowstorm from Stapleton International Airport in Denver, Colorado, United States, on November 15, 1987. The Douglas DC-9 airliner, operated by Continental Airlines, was making a scheduled flight to Boise, Idaho. Twenty-five passengers and three crew members died in the crash.

The National Transportation Safety Board (NTSB) investigation of the accident determined that the most probable cause of the accident was a combination of multiple factors: the failure on the part of the pilot in command to have the aircraft de-iced a second time before takeoff, over-rotation on takeoff by the first officer, and flight crew inexperience.

== Background information ==
=== Aircraft ===
Flight 1713 was operated using a 21-year-old Douglas DC-9-14, a twin-engined, narrow-body jet airliner with the registration number N626TX. The aircraft was equipped with two Pratt & Whitney JT8D-7B engines. It was originally delivered to Air Canada in May 1966 and sold to Texas International Airlines in 1968, where it served the majority of its service until Texas International was acquired by Continental in 1982. In 21 years of service, it had accumulated over 52,400 flight hours and over 61,800 cycles.

=== Crew ===
The captain was 43-year-old Frank Benjamin Zvonek Jr., who had been with Continental Airlines since 1969. He had 12,125 hours of flight experience, but only 166 hours on the DC-9, or "on type." He had been upgraded to captain less than three weeks earlier. The first officer was 26-year-old Lee Edward Bruecher, hired by Continental four months earlier; he had previously flown for Rio Airways and passed his initial proficiency check in the DC-9 in mid-September. He had 3,186 flight hours, but only 36 hours on the DC-9, which was the extent of his turbojet experience and he had not flown at all for the past 24 days. The cabin crew consisted of three flight attendants.

=== Weather ===
At the time of the accident on Sunday afternoon, the National Weather Service was reporting moderate wet snow at Stapleton International Airport. The heaviest snowfall rate occurred between 13:10 and 14:20 MST, with the peak snowfall rate occurring around 13:50.

== Accident ==
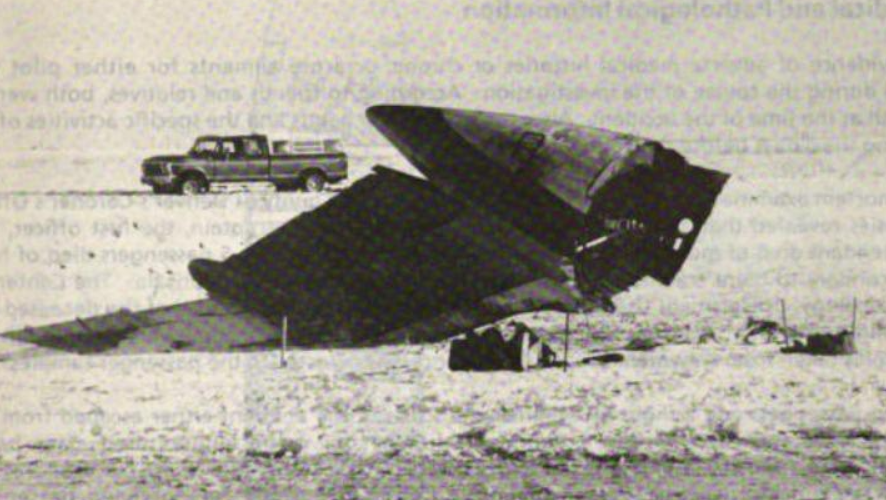
Post-crash photo of the tail of Flight 1713

Continental Airlines Flight 1713 was scheduled to depart Denver at 12:25, but many flights out of Denver that day were delayed by the inclement weather. At 13:03, Flight 1713 taxied from its gate to the deicing pad; unfortunately, air traffic controllers were not aware that Flight 1713 had departed the gate because the flight crew had done so without first requesting taxi clearance. Deicing was completed at 13:46.

At 13:51, Flight 1713 contacted the clearance delivery controller for permission to "taxi from the ice pad." The clearance delivery controller, believing that Flight 1713 was still at the gate and requesting to proceed to deicing, instructed the flight to contact Ground Control, who then cleared Flight 1713 to taxi to the deicing pad. Having already completed deicing, Flight 1713's crew seem to have interpreted this new clearance to mean they could now taxi from the pad and proceed to the runway.

At 14:05, Flight 1713 was lined up on the number-one position at the north end of Runway 35L and the crew was ready for takeoff. Not kept properly informed of Flight 1713’s position, the air traffic controllers tried repeatedly to have different planes take off, leaving Flight 1713 standing in the falling snow for several minutes and opening the airliner to the risk of "wing contamination" by ice. Flight 1713 then notified air traffic controllers that they were holding at the start of the runway and awaiting takeoff instructions.

Flight 1713 was cleared for takeoff at 14:14. As the DC-9 was taking off, the pilot over-rotated; the aircraft descended and the left wing struck the ground, causing the wing to separate. A fuel-fed flash fire ignited in the left wing shortly after it struck the ground, causing a "fireball" inside the cabin. The left side of the fuselage and cockpit struck the ground next and the plane continued rolling until inverted. As the DC-9 skidded, the left side was tilted over and the tail was inverted; this action caused the center section of the fuselage to compress and crush many of the passengers on board.

A total of twenty-five passengers and three crew members died in the crash; the final two fatalities succumbed while hospitalized. The captain, the first officer, one flight attendant, and eleven of the passengers died from blunt trauma. In addition, five passengers died of head injuries secondary to blunt trauma and nine passengers died of asphyxia. The remaining 52 passengers and two flight attendants survived. Of the surviving passengers, 25 received minor injuries and 27 received serious injuries. Fitzsimons Army Medical Center sent its personnel to assist in the triage of passengers and 10 hospitals treated the survivors.

== Investigation ==
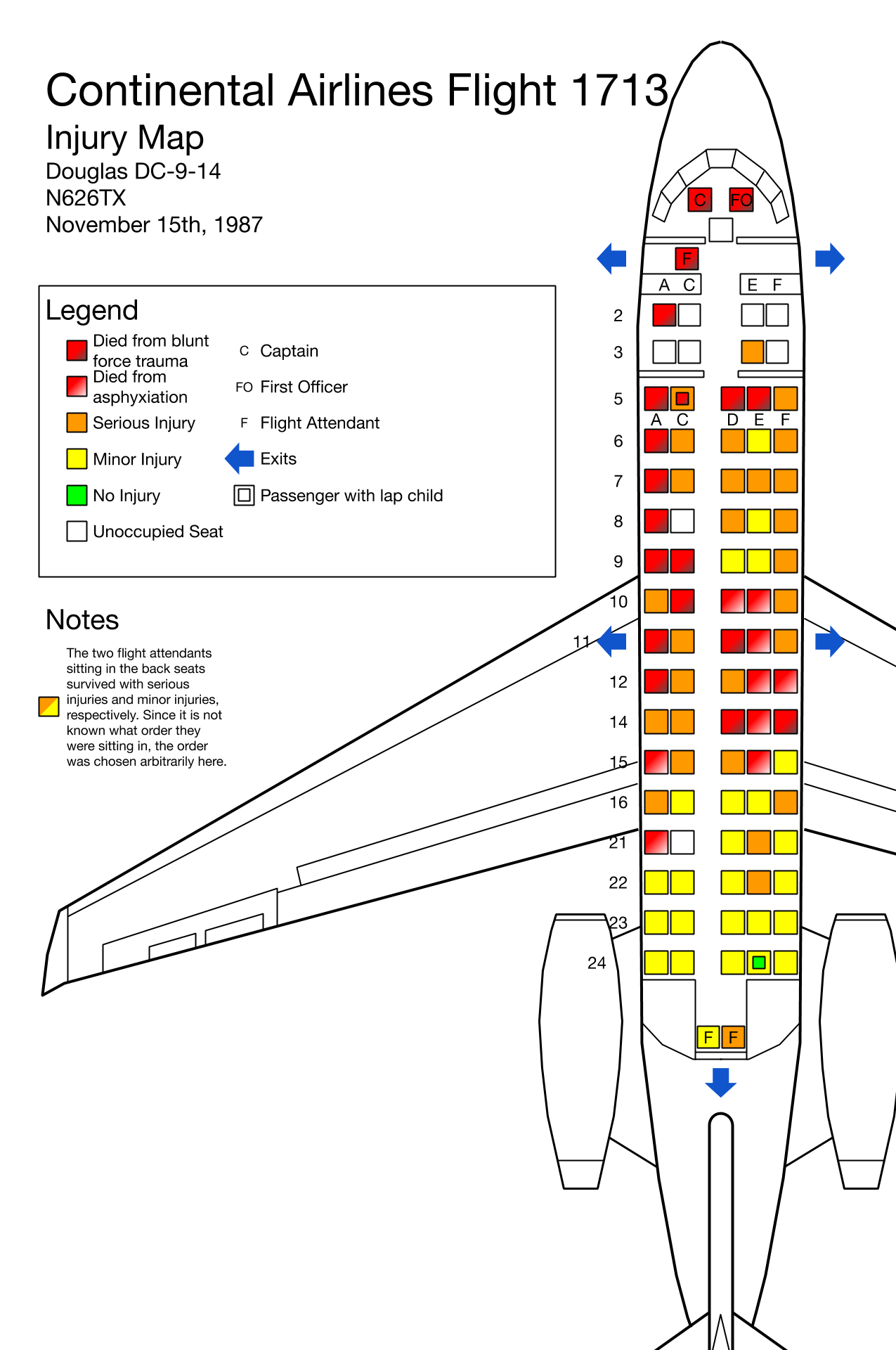
The seating chart of Continental Airlines Flight 1713, based on the official NTSB report: The chart illustrates locations of passengers, lack of injuries, severities of injuries, and causes of deaths, all where applicable.

The NTSB investigated the accident.

In July 1988, Continental Airlines filed a report with the NTSB positing the causes of the crash as wake turbulence, poor snow plowing on the runway, and errors by air traffic controllers. However, the NTSB investigated the wake-turbulence theory and concluded that wake turbulence from the preceding flight would not have affected Flight 1713.

During the investigation, the crew's low levels of experience on the DC-9 were brought up as possible causes. Investigators also discovered that before he began working for Continental, First Officer Bruecher had been dismissed from another airline after failing on three occasions to pass a flight examination. Investigators likewise determined that Bruecher was at the controls at the time of the accident.

Investigators determined that 27 minutes elapsed between the conclusion of deicing and Flight 1713's attempt to take off, 7 minutes longer than should have been allowed to elapse before takeoff. The NTSB concluded that a build-up of ice on the wings of Flight 1713 had contaminated the surfaces of both of the wings prior to departure, based on reports from surviving passengers that they had seen "patches" of ice on the wings after deicing was complete. Investigators also concluded that enough wet snow landed on Flight 1713 after deicing was complete to melt and dilute the deicing fluid, which allowed ice to reform on the wings. According to the aircraft's manufacturer, even a modest amount of ice contamination on the upper wing could impair the lifting performance of the wings and lead to loss of roll and pitch control. Based on this, the NTSB concluded that a small amount of ice on the wings had caused Flight 1713 to have significant controllability problems.

The NTSB also determined that First Officer Bruecher's poor performance during takeoff had likely contributed to his loss of control of the airplane. The first officer rotated the airplane at more than 6°/sec or twice the recommended rate. Combined with the effects of ice on the wing, the high climb rate caused the plane's left wing to stall and the plane to begin rolling over. Flight 1713 was Bruecher's first flight after a 24-day absence from flight duties and the NTSB concluded that this prolonged absence had eroded the newly hired first officer's retention of his recent training, which contributed to his poor takeoff performance.

On September 27, 1988, the NTSB published a final report on its investigation into the crash, attributing the accident to the captain's failure to have the plane deiced a second time, the first officer's poor takeoff performance, and confusion between the pilots and air traffic controllers, which contributed to delays, compounded by a cockpit crew where both pilots were relatively inexperienced on the aircraft type. Specifically, the NTSB concluded:

The National Transportation Safety Board determines that the probable cause of this accident was the captain's failure to have the airplane deiced a second time after a delay before takeoff that led to upper wing surface contamination and a loss of control during rapid takeoff rotation by the first officer. Contributing to the accident were the absence of regulatory or management controls governing operations by newly qualified flight crew members and the confusion that existed between the flight crew members and air traffic controllers that led to the delay in departure.

== Aftermath ==
After the crash, Continental Airlines reiterated its procedures for handling deicing and developed a computerized assignment program that would prevent "green-on-green" crewing or keep pilots with fewer than 100 hours flying time in type from being assigned to the same flight.

Nine months after the crash of Flight 1713, Delta Air Lines Flight 1141 crashed in Dallas. When the NTSB released its report on Flight 1713, it specifically mentioned the fact that "almost 3 minutes of non-pertinent social conversation" had occurred before takeoff. When the NTSB later issued its report on Delta 1141, it found that the Delta crew had also engaged in non-pertinent conversation, including a discussion of the cockpit voice recorder from the crash of Continental 1713; First Officer Carey Kirkland joked with flight attendant Dixie Dunn (the latter a fatality) that they too should discuss their crew's love lives so "then the media would have some kind of juicy tidbit" from their CVR in event of a similar disaster.

== In popular culture ==
Continental Airlines Flight 1713 was mentioned in the 1988 film Rain Man.

The crash was the subject of episode 10, season 18 of Mayday, titled "Dead of Winter".

== See also ==
- Air Ontario Flight 1363
- Ryan International Airlines Flight 590
- USAir Flight 405
- Air Florida Flight 90
- Turkish Airlines Flight 301
