= Eddie Marsh =

Eddie Marsh may refer to:

- Eddie Marsh (footballer) (1927–2010), Scottish footballer
- Eddie Marsh (bishop), Canadian bishop
