= USAir Flight 405 =

1992 aviation accident in New York

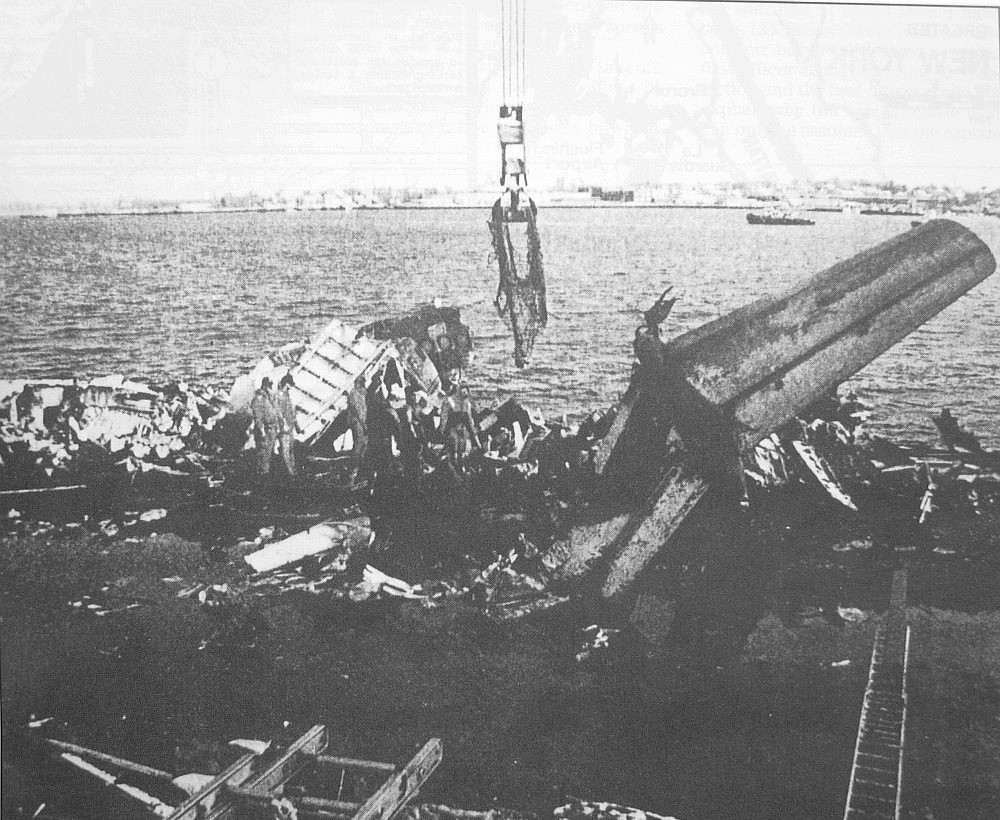
- Wreckage of the aircraft recovered from Flushing Bay

Accident
- Date: March 22, 1992
- Summary: Runway excursion after icing
- Site: Flushing Bay near LaGuardia Airport, New York City, United States; 40°46′18″N 73°51′22″W

Aircraft
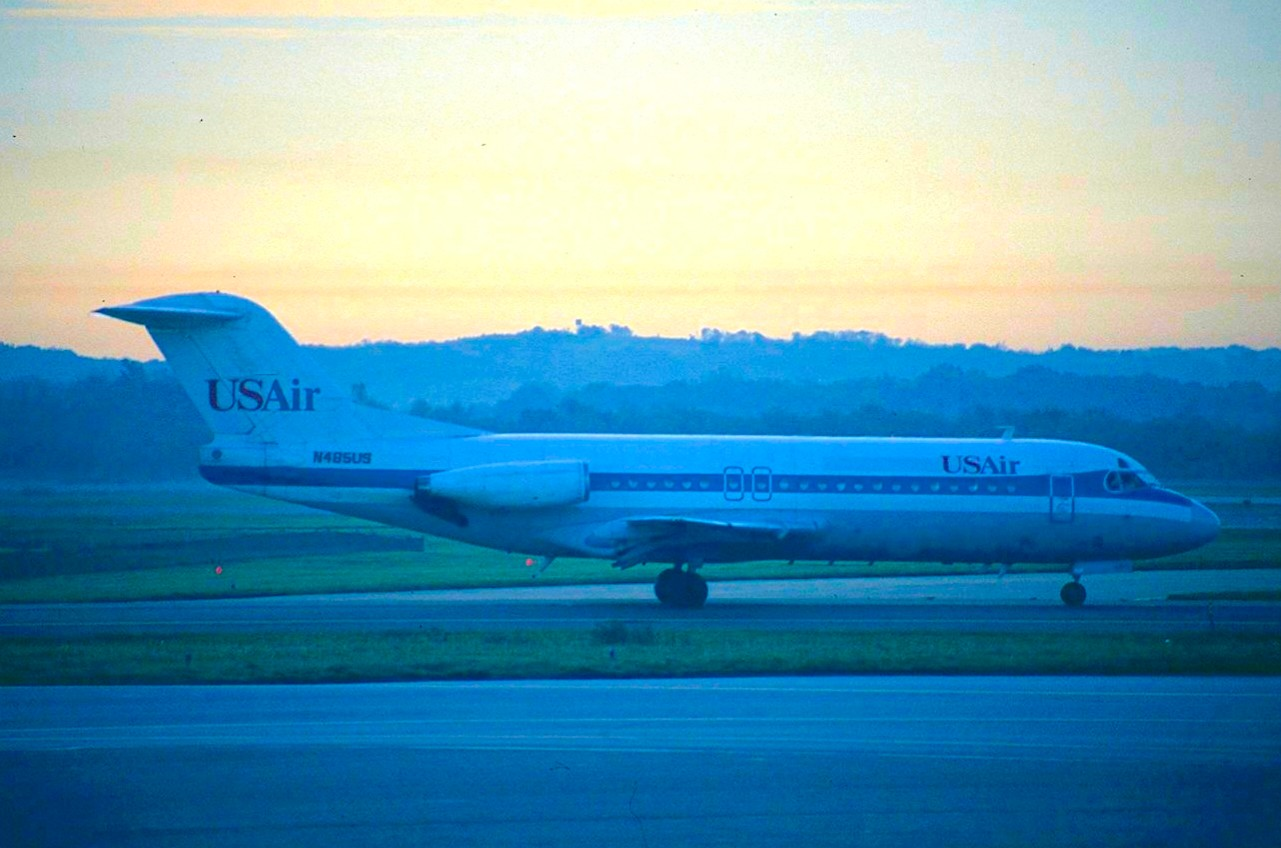
- N485US, the aircraft involved in the accident, pictured in 1990 with a previous livery
- Aircraft type: Fokker 28
- Operator: USAir
- IATA flight No.: US405
- ICAO flight No.: USA405
- Call sign: US AIR 405
- Registration: N485US
- Flight origin: LaGuardia Airport, New York City, United States
- Destination: Cleveland Hopkins International Airport, Cleveland, Ohio, United States
- Occupants: 51
- Passengers: 47
- Crew: 4
- Fatalities: 27
- Injuries: 21
- Survivors: 24

USAir Flight 405 was a regularly scheduled American domestic passenger flight between LaGuardia Airport in New York City and Cleveland, Ohio. On March 22, 1992, the Fokker F28 Fellowship operating the flight crashed in poor weather in a partially inverted position in Flushing Bay, shortly after liftoff from LaGuardia. The undercarriage lifted off from the runway, but the airplane failed to gain lift, flying only several meters above the ground. The aircraft then veered off the runway and hit several obstructions before coming to rest in Flushing Bay, just beyond the end of the runway. Of the 51 people on board, 27 were killed, including the captain and a member of the cabin crew.

A similar accident had happened three years before, when Air Ontario Flight 1363 crashed shortly after takeoff at Dryden Regional Airport after ice had accumulated on the wings and airframe.

The subsequent investigation revealed that due to pilot error, inadequate deicing procedures at LaGuardia, and several lengthy delays, a large amount of ice had accumulated on the wings and airframe. This ice disrupted airflow over the wing, increasing drag and reducing lift, which prevented the jet from lifting off the runway. The National Transportation Safety Board concluded that the flight crew was unaware of the amount of ice that had built up after the jet was delayed by heavy ground traffic taxiing to the runway. The report also listed as a contributing factor the fact that the aircraft had begun its takeoff rotation too early at a lower speed than was standard.

Investigators also found that the deicing procedures at LaGuardia were substandard. While the jet encountered a delay up to 35 minutes, they found that the deicing fluid that was being used at the airport, and by the majority of commercial airlines across the United States, was effective for only 15 minutes. The accident led to a number of studies into the effect of ice on aircraft, and several recommendations into prevention techniques.

== Flight history ==
The aircraft involved in the accident was a Fokker 28 airplane manufactured in the Netherlands. A two-engined, medium-range jet, the Fokker 28-4000 is designed for transporting up to 85 passengers. The jet involved in the accident was registered in the United States as N485US. It was first delivered to Piedmont Airlines in August 1986, and was acquired by USAir (US Airways) three years later in August 1989 when Piedmont and USAir merged. N485US had amassed a total of 12,462 flying hours at the time of the accident.

Captain Wallace J. Majure II, 44, who was fully qualified to pilot the F28 and four other commercial aircraft types, had accumulated about 9,820 total flying hours, of which 2,200 hours were in the F28. Majure was initially hired as an F28 first officer by Piedmont Airlines in 1985. He was later reassigned to serve as a first officer and then a captain on a Boeing 737, but finally returned to an F28 captain because of company cutbacks. He previously served for United States Navy from 1969 until 1985.

First Officer John Rachuba, 30, was hired by Piedmont in 1989. At the time of the accident, company records indicate that he had accumulated around 4,507 flying hours, of which 29 hours were in the F28. Rachuba held a flight engineer certificate with ratings for turbojet-powered aircraft and an expired instructor certificate issued on August 16, 1987. He also held a Federal Aviation Administration license for non federal control towers. Previously, he had served as a flight engineer on Boeing 707s and Boeing 727s.

== Accident ==
=== Poor weather, deicing, taxiing delays ===
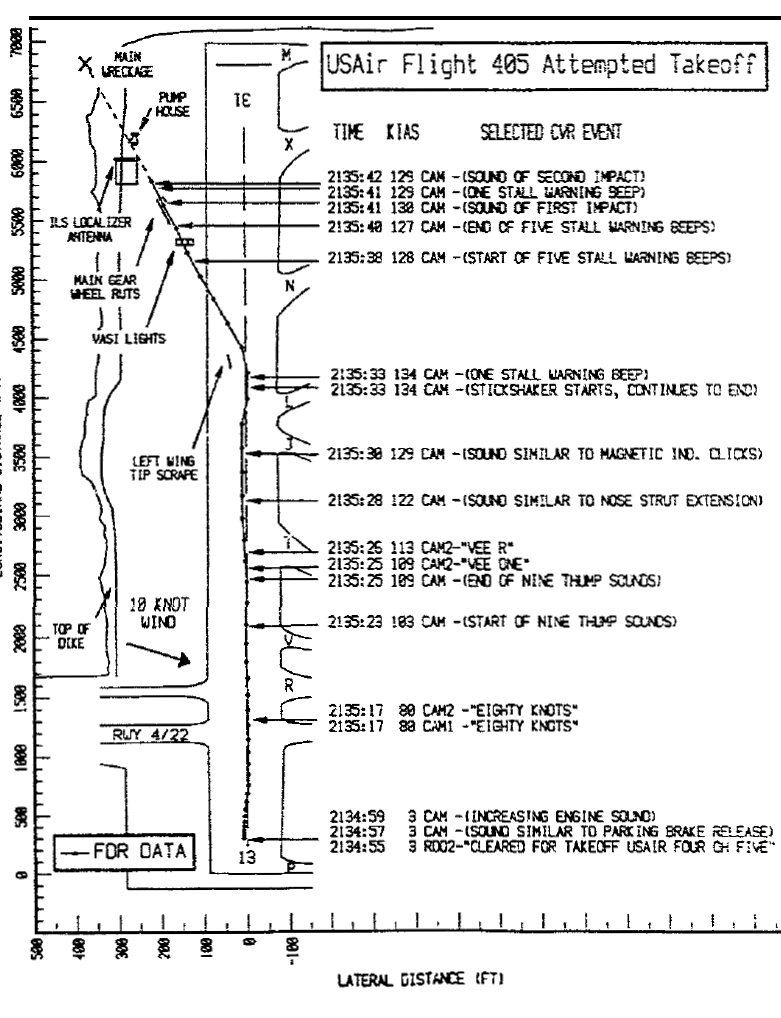
An NTSB diagram of Flight 405's attempted takeoff, showing it veered off the left of the runway and hit a water pump

The aircraft took off from Jacksonville International Airport, Florida, several hours before the accident, although the departure from Jacksonville was delayed by poor weather over New York and the removal of the baggage of a passenger who decided not to board the jet. The instrument approach landing was uneventful and the jet was not significantly delayed while in the air waiting to land, but congestion on the taxiways at LaGuardia delayed the arrival of the aircraft at the gate.

One hour and six minutes behind schedule, the jet arrived at Gate B1, where the captain advised a line mechanic that his airplane was "good to go." The flight crew left the aircraft to go to the terminal, and did not perform an aircraft walk around inspection of the aircraft, nor was he required to by company policy. The poor weather did not improve as the jet was deiced with type I fluid, a heated 50/50 water/glycol mixture. Following the completion of this process, one of the two deicing trucks delayed the pushback of the jet when it experienced mechanical problems. The vehicle was immobilized for 20 minutes in such a position that it prevented the aircraft from taxiing to the runway. After the deicing truck was repaired, the pilot requested a second deicing due to the delay. Following the second deicing, LaGuardia ground control granted Flight 405 permission to taxi to Runway 13. The flight crew completed the before-takeoff checklist during the taxi.

Engine anti-ice protection was turned on for the two engines during taxi. The captain announced to passengers that the flaps would remain up during taxi so the aircraft's wheels would not splash slush onto the wings during the taxi, and they should not be worried seeing them in the retracted position. He placed an empty coffee cup on the flap handle as a reminder of the position of the flaps, a procedure used by many flight crews. The captain told the first officer they would use standard USAir contaminated runway procedures that included the use of 18° flaps, and also decided that they would take off with a reduced V_{1} speed of 110 knots (130 mph; 200 km/h).

At the time of the accident, recorded broadcasts available to pilots contained information that runway 13/31 was coated with a thin layer of wet snow, and that it had been plowed and sanded, and the other runway was closed for snow removal. The previous announcement mentioned that the runways had also been treated with urea.

The first officer described the snowfall as "not heavy, no large flakes." He told accident investigators that snow was sliding off the jet and the nose of the airplane was coated in a watery layer. He used a light positioned on the wing of his jet to check for signs of ice several times before they attempted to take off. Neither the pilot nor he saw any evidence of contamination on the wing or on the black strip, so they decided against a third deicing. He told investigators that he checked the wings "maybe 10 times, but at least three." He said that he did not consider the snowfall heavy, and he did not recall any wind blowing the snow. The first officer stated that as they taxied, they looked back at the wings several times. Near the time of the takeoff, he said, "looks good to me, black strip is clear."

While taxiing, the flight crew discussed deicing procedures that were used at other airports. The first officer suggested to the pilot that they pull close to the aircraft ahead of them in the queue because it "might keep our wings clear for us." The pilot replied, "it can cause us to refreeze, too ... I don't want to be very close to him." Later, the first officer remarked, "look at all that stuff. What is that?" to which the pilot replied, "sand I guess, urea sand."

The pilot of a jet taxiing behind Flight 405, Northwest Airlines Flight 517, a Boeing 757 bound for Minneapolis–Saint Paul International Airport, stated that he had a good view of the top of Flight 405's wing, and that just enough snow was on the fuselage to "fuzzy" the USAir printing, but that the wings appeared to be clear. He believed that the snow had "all but stopped" and was more concerned about the amount of vehicular traffic, such as sweepers and plows, than he was about the snowfall. The second officer of Trump Shuttle Flight 1541, which had landed around the time Flight 405 was taxiing, said their Boeing 727 had "picked up a lot of snow quickly during my post-landing walkaround, but by the finish it seemed to be more rain." He described Flight 405 as a "fairly clean airplane." He said that he could not comment on clear ice, but that the wings and fuselage were clear of snow.

The jet, already several hours behind schedule, then suffered further delays taxiing to the runway. The weather had created heavy ground traffic at LaGuardia, and queues of aircraft were reported to be waiting for permission for takeoff. Investigators estimated that the plane took between 25 and 45 minutes to taxi from the gate to the runway.

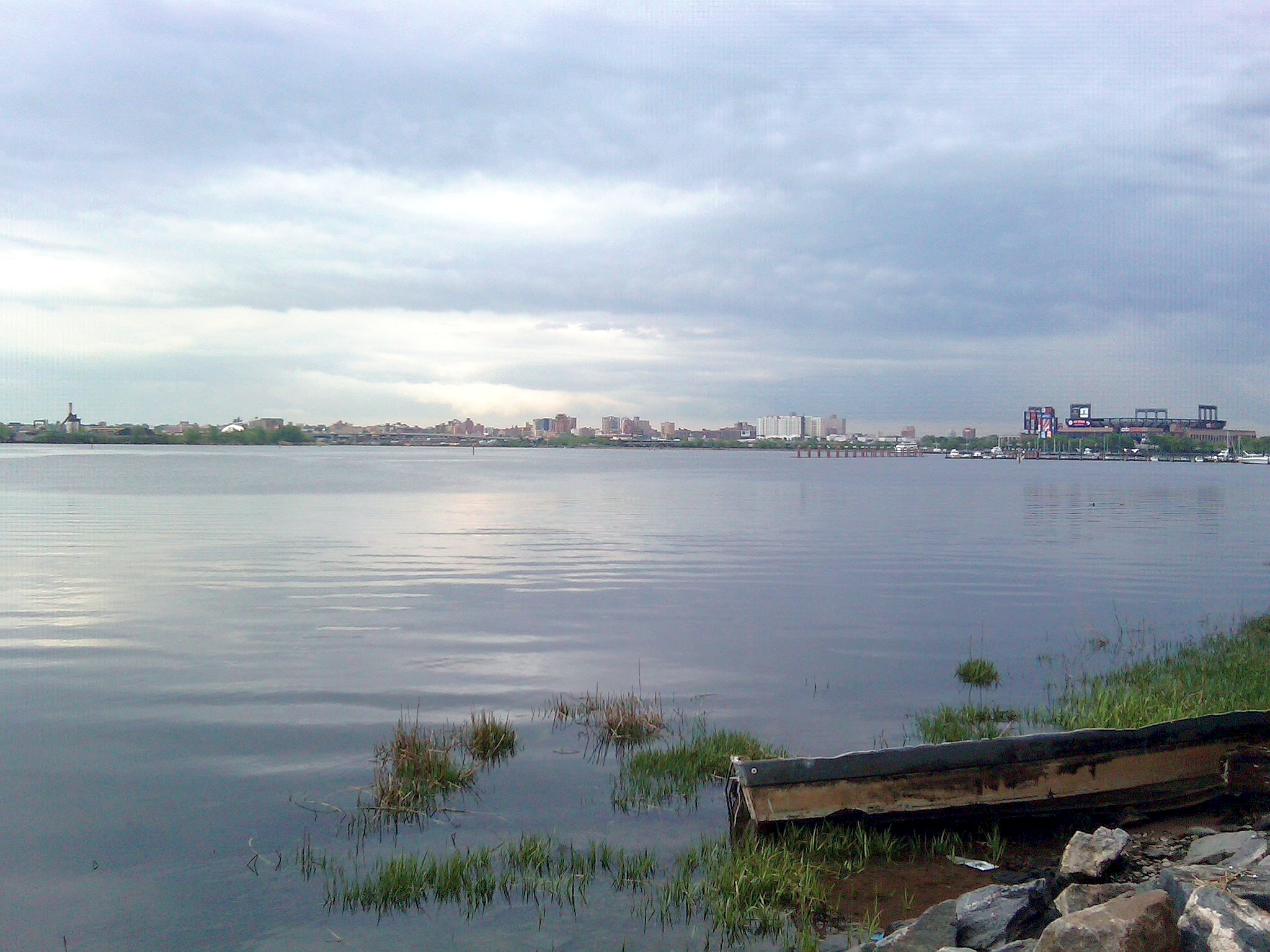
Flushing Bay, New York, where the aircraft came to rest in a partially inverted position

=== Crash ===
Following permission for takeoff from controllers, the flight crew initiated the takeoff procedure and the first officer made a callout of 80 knots (92 mph; 150 km/h), and several seconds later, a V_{1} callout, followed shortly after by a V_{R} callout. Approximately 2.2 seconds after the V_{R} callout, the nose gear left the ground. The final report read, "the first officer described the takeoff as normal through the rotation. He stated that no problem was evident with vibration, rate of acceleration, ambient noise, [or] directional control". However, The New York Times reported that "several passengers sensed that [the airplane] was not going fast enough."

The first officer said it was "just like we lost lift." As the captain attempted to level the wings, the crew used right rudder to maneuver the aircraft back toward the ground and avoid the water below. The accident report found, "the first officer said that they seemed to agree that the airplane was not going to fly and that their control inputs were in unison." Rachuba and Majure continued to try to hold the nose up to impact in a flat attitude, although Rachuba later stated that they made no "heavy control inputs." The final report further noted, "first officer stated that he did not touch the power levers." The first officer later told investigators that the flight crew's primary focus was to find a safe place to land.

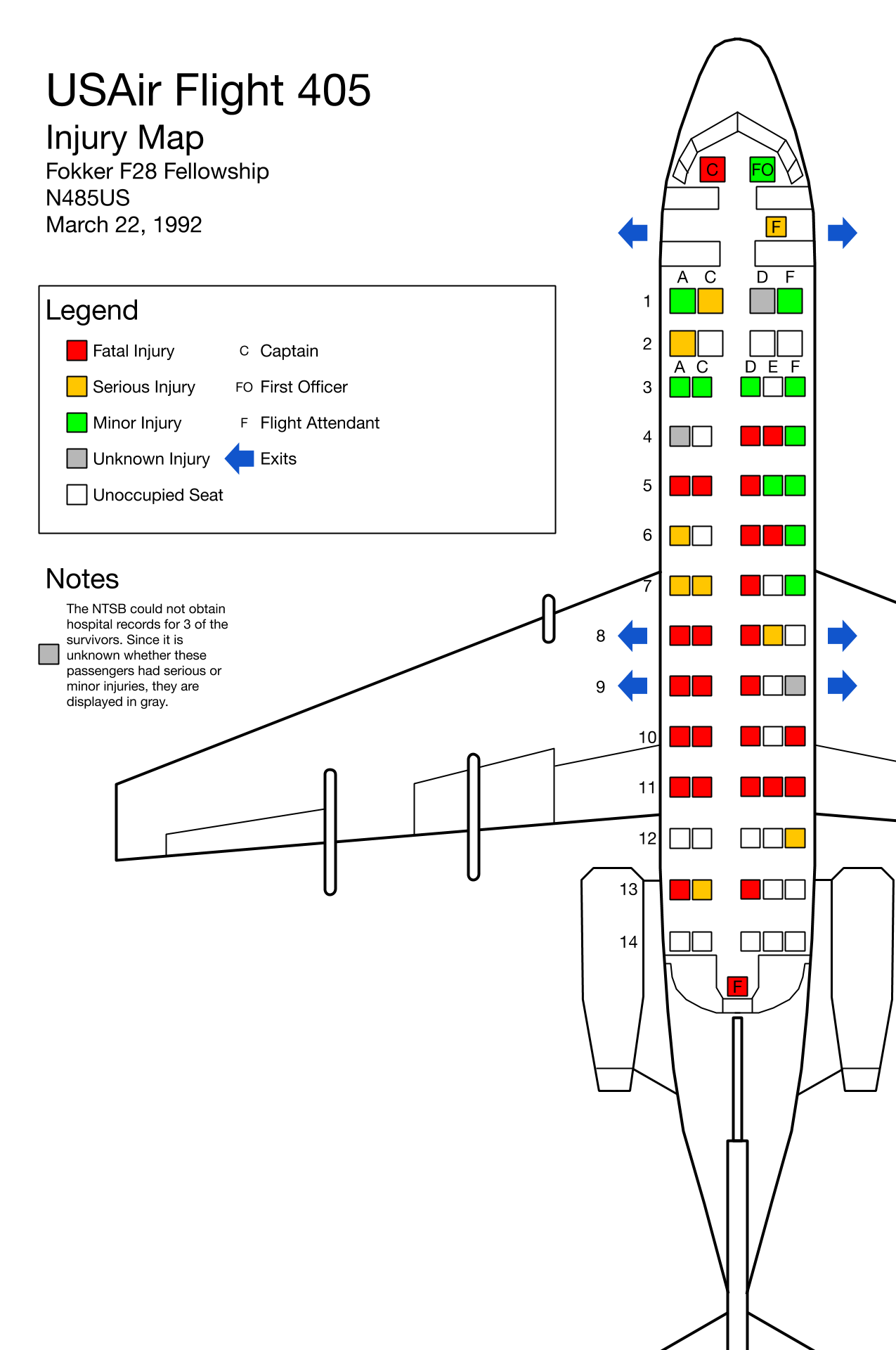
Injury and death map of flight 405

Just under five seconds after the undercarriage left the ground, the plane's left wing scraped against the asphalt for 110 feet (34 m), and the stick shaker activated. The crew received six stall warnings, before the jet began banking to the left, then to the right, and then to the left again, still only several meters above the ground. The aircraft struck two visual approach slope-indicator posts, touched down again for about 100 feet (30 m), before lifting off again and striking an instrument landing system beacon and a water pump house.

The left wing then separated from the body of the airplane, before the fuselage struck the edge of Flushing Bay and came to rest in a partially inverted position. Parts of the fuselage and cockpit were submerged in water. Confusion, disorientation, or entrapment most likely caused the drowning of passengers who otherwise sustained only minor injuries and injuries that were not life-threatening. The final report read:

Prior to impact, passengers did not assume the brace position. When the airplane came to rest, many of the passengers in the forward portion of the cabin were upside down; others, who were upright, were submerged in water over their heads. Some passengers tried to move from their seats while their seatbelts were still buckled, and other passengers had difficulty locating and releasing their seatbelt buckles because of disorientation. Following the accident, passengers reported fires in the forward left and aft portions of the airplane, including many small fires on the water. Passengers stated that they escaped through large holes in the cabin. The lead flight attendant and first officer escaped through a hole in the cabin floor near the flight attendant's position. Several passengers reported assisting others out of the cabin and into the knee-deep water. Many of them walked in the water to the dike, climbed up the wall and over an embankment, and slid down a steep hill to the runway. Others were assisted out of the water by ground personnel.

=== Rescue attempts, medical operation ===
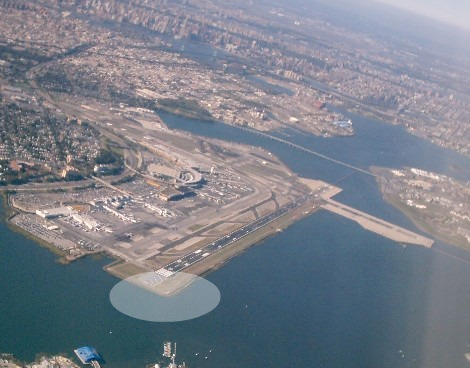
The crash site of USAir Flight 405 is highlighted by the white oval.

The tower cab coordinator on duty at the time of the accident stated that he saw a fireball emanating from the crash site following the accident. Upon seeing the flames, he sounded an alarm, alerting the Port Authority of New York and New Jersey Police, who responded. An investigation revealed that technical issues existed with an emergency telephone at LaGuardia, however it was found that these issues did not hinder the emergency response.

The Port Authority of New York and New Jersey Police Department initially sent four vehicles. Personnel in these vehicles reported that snow and fog hampered their visibility while heading to the crash site, and they could not see the destroyed aircraft. One member of the fire crew, though, observed people standing on top of a dike near the crash site. Police divers also entered the water following the crash, although they found no one alive inside the jet or in the water. The firefighters continued spraying the fire, and the incident commander estimated that they had the fire under control 10 minutes after their arrival at the scene. The New York Times reported that:

The accident sent thick, black smoke billowing above the airport as more than 200 emergency workers ... had to contend not only with blustery snow, but [also] the powerful icy current in Flushing Bay ... the tense drama of the rescue continued into the early hours, with firefighters and police officers in water up to their shoulders and helicopters shining spotlights on the wreckage and an ice-covered mound of earth at the end of the runway so slick, the rescue workers needed metal ladders to walk across it.

The NTSB report on the accident noted, but did not criticize, the medical operation at the scene. It described how paramedics attended to those who were conscious with life-threatening injuries, but did not make any attempts to resuscitate victims who appeared drowned or lacked vital signs because they believed that they could not be revived because they had succumbed to the cold salt water. An estimated (by the authorities who attended the scene of the crash) 15 ambulances responded to the accident site, all of which were used to transport the injured to hospitals, and that 40 additional ambulances were available near the site of the crash, but were not needed.

The report described the emergency response as "effective and contributed to the survivability of the airplane's occupants. However, the response by the emergency medical services personnel was inadequately coordinated, and the ambulance response times to the hospitals were excessive." The final report read:

... a basic principle of triage is to treat victims having the most life-threatening injuries first with available medical resources and to utilize limited medical personnel in a manner that will provide maximum effectiveness. However, the Safety Board is also aware that in recent years a number of victims of cold-water drowning have been successfully resuscitated. They survived after periods under water, including sea water, as long as one hour or more. In view of these facts, the Safety Board believes that all emergency-response organizations should review their emergency plans to include contingencies for applying cardiopulmonary resuscitation (CPR) techniques as soon as a sufficient number of trained personnel arrive to perform CPR, even during mass casualty/triage incidents, regardless of whether vital signs are present, especially if cold-water immersion/near drowning is involved and where traumatic injuries do not indicate death.

== Investigation ==
The NTSB sent a team to the crash site to investigate the accident. They concluded that, unknown to the crew, ice had collected on the wings, which disrupted airflow and reduced lift. The inquiry lasted just under one year.

=== Buildup of ice ===
The investigators suggested multiple reasons why the jet was unable to gain lift, but the accident report states no evidence was found to suggest corrosion on the wings. The airplane's flight control systems were also examined and revealed no failure prior to impact. The report reads, "the evidence did not support improper wing configuration, airframe or system defects, or deployment of the speed brakes as reasons for the loss of aerodynamic efficiency." The investigators also stated that the takeoff roll of the jet was not abnormal. The board came to the conclusion that ice had built up on the wings, and this had contributed largely to the accident.

When attempting to find out why ice was present on the wings of the jet, the board determined that the airplane had been properly cleared of ice and snow during the two deicing procedures at the gate. However, about 35 minutes elapsed between the second time that the aircraft was deiced and the initiation of takeoff during which the airplane was exposed to continuing precipitation in below-freezing temperatures. The NTSB was unable to determine how much ice had built up on the wings following the second deicing, but considered it to be highly likely that "some contamination occurred in the 35 minutes following the second deicing and that this accumulation led to this accident."

"The Safety Board views the evidence as conclusive that the primary factor in this accident was the reduced performance of the wing due to ice contamination. Therefore, the Safety Board evaluated the extent to which the decisions of, and procedures used by, the flight crew could have contributed to the accident," read the final report. Although, when the cockpit was examined, the engine anti-ice switch was found in the 'OFF' position, further investigations found that even slight pressure could move the switch, and the NTSB ruled this out as a contributing factor in the crash. Following the accident, USAir sent out a maintenance directive ordering engine anti-ice switches to be changed on F28s so they would lock into a selected position.

Investigators found that a flaw in the design of the F28's wings made them extremely vulnerable to ice buildup. Because of the angle of the wings, even a very small amount of ice could have devastating effects. When the NTSB, in collaboration with Boeing, investigated the effect ice can have on an aircraft, they found that ice particles as small as 1–2 mm (0.039–0.079 in) of a density of one particle per square centimeter can cause a loss of lift over 20%. A document written by Boeing before the accident detailed the effect of ice on the wing of Boeing 737 warned that an "uncontrollable roll" would begin even with a small amount of ice on the wings.

=== Errors by the flight crew ===
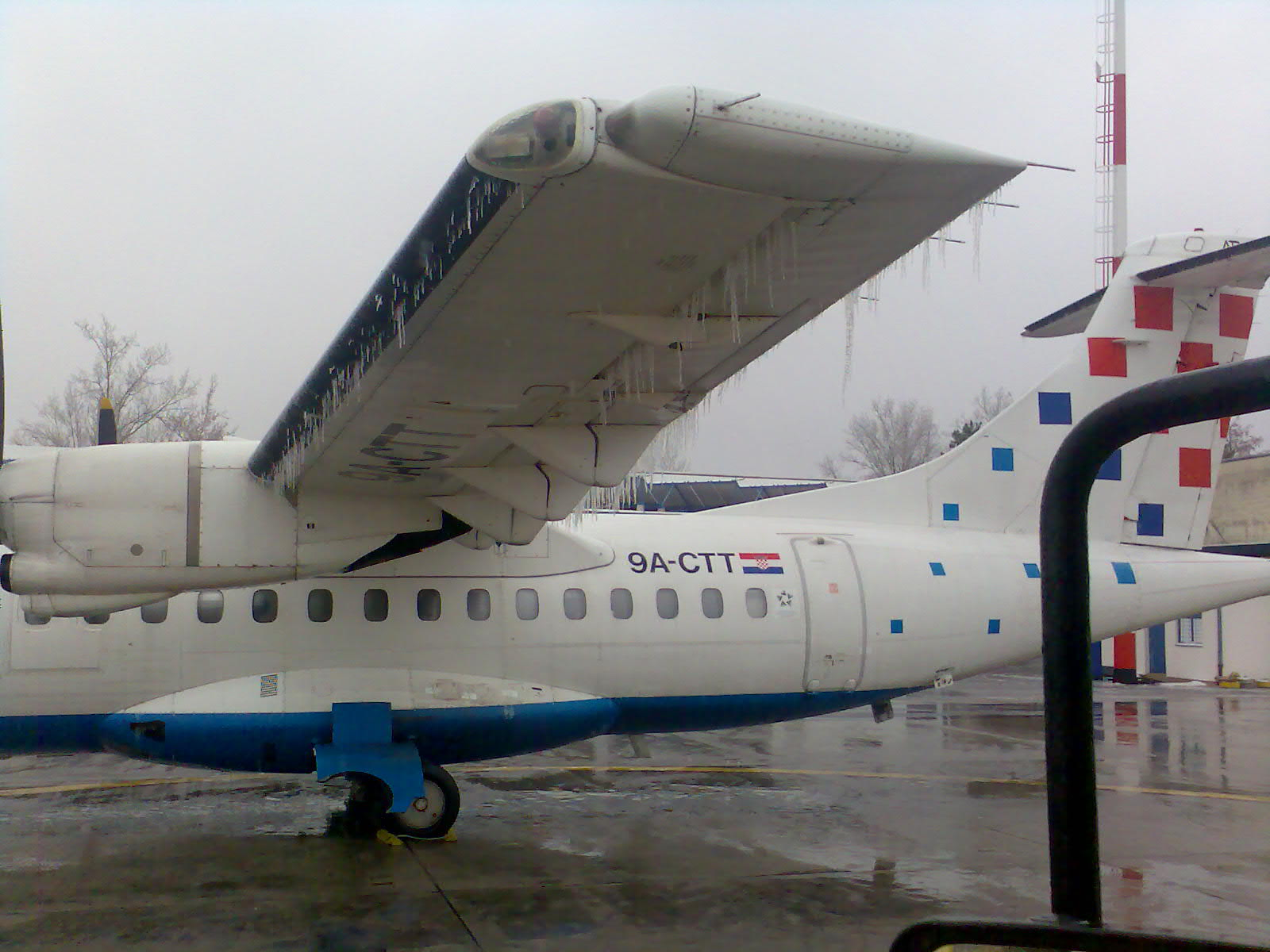

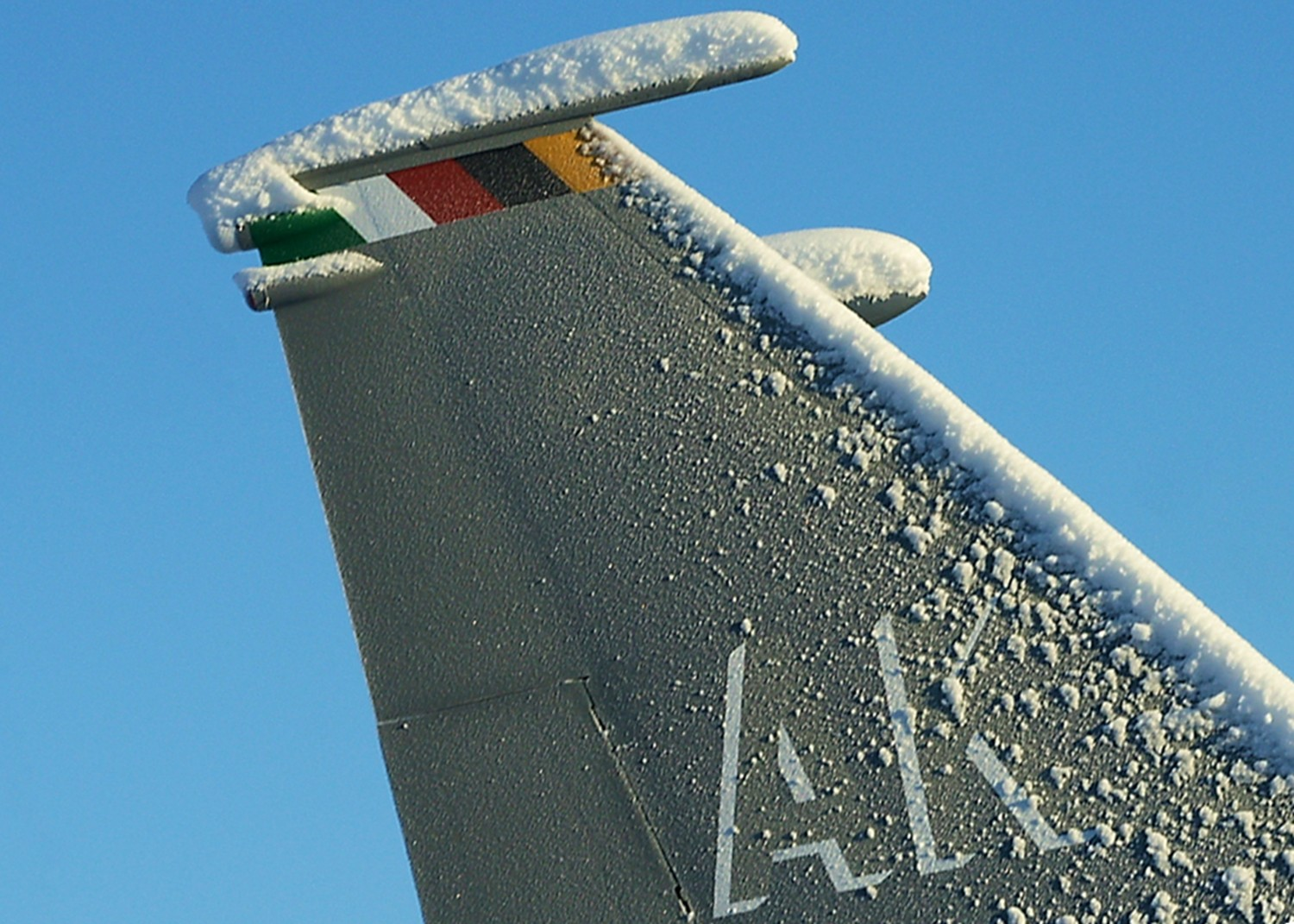
Two images detailing the effect that ice can have on aircraft

The report found that the flight crew was aware that the poor weather was likely to cause ice buildup, but neither of them took any action to check the condition of the wing leading edge and upper surface. The aircraft was evaluated by ground crew and was deiced. After the mechanical failure of the deicing truck, the investigators reported that, as the captain requested another deice, he was:

... concerned about the continuing exposure to precipitation, and the request was prudent and in accordance with USAir guidance. Following the second deicing, the flight crew was most likely satisfied that the airplane was free of adhering contamination. The flight crew was not aware of the exact delay that they would encounter before takeoff and their decision to leave the gate was reasonable. After taxiing, when it became evident that they would be delayed for a prolonged period, conversations between the crew showed that they were aware of and probably concerned about the risk of reaccumulating frozen contamination on the wing.

They also found that USAir guidance and flight-crew training was sufficient and should have alerted the flight crew to the risk of attempting a takeoff while they were unaware of the condition of the wing. USAir guidance to flight crews specifically stated:

... it is the captain's responsibility to exercise caution prior to takeoff. If the elapsed time since deicing exceeds 20 minutes, careful examination of the surfaces should be conducted to detect the extent of accumulation [of ice] and to assure that the takeoff can be made safely and in compliance with existing [regulations].

The final report read:

The Safety Board believes that the flight crew of Flight 405 should have taken more positive steps to assure a contamination-free wing, such as entering the cabin to look at the wing from a closer range. Although the Safety Board acknowledges that the detection of minimal amounts of contamination, sufficient to cause aerodynamic performance problems, is difficult and may not be possible without a tactile inspection, an observation from the cabin would have improved the chance of seeing some contamination and might have prompted the flight crew to return to the gate. The Safety Board believes that the flight crew's failure to take such precautions and the decision to attempt takeoff while unsure of wing cleanliness led to this accident and is a cause of it.

In a television interview, one of the NTSB investigators suggested, "the captain was faced with quite a problem. If he wanted to be deiced a third time, he would have had to get out of the line [of jets waiting to take off] and taxi all the way back to the parking area and meet up with a deicing truck again. That would have put him very, very late, and it may have even caused the cancellation of the flight."

The NTSB carried out tests to discover why the first officer was unable to see the ice buildup on the wing of the jet. When the sliding window of the cockpit was fully open, the first officer would have been able to see the outer 80% of the wing, including the black strip used to contrast the white surface of the wing so the flight crew can search for a build up of ice. When the sliding window was shut, as it was in the accident, making out any details of the wing would be difficult, and the black strip would have been distorted by the glass. They also found that the ice light made little difference in how much the first officer would have been able to see.

The investigators also requested that Boeing conduct a study of the effects of ice contamination and pilot technique on the F28 aircraft. The NTSB evaluated the data from the tests, and found that the pilot initiated the rotation 5 knots (5.8 mph; 9.3 km/h) earlier at 119 knots (137 mph; 220 km/h) instead of the proper rotation speed of 124 knots (143 mph; 230 km/h). The data from Boeing were correlated with the cockpit voice recording and confirmed that the first officer called a rotation speed of 113 knots (130 mph; 209 km/h), but the captain did not rotate until 119 knots. Why the rotation was called and initiated earlier than was standard was never established.

=== Deicing procedures at LaGuardia ===
Investigators also focused on deicing practices at LaGuardia. They found that the airport was using only type I deicing fluid, not type II. Type I fluids are used for the actual deicing of the jet, while type II fluids are used for preventing buildup of ice. At the time of the accident, LaGuardia had prohibited the use of type II deicing fluid because tests suggested that if it fell onto runways, it reduced friction. Investigators noted the change had been made because of LaGuardia's shorter runways and because if an aircraft left the vicinity of the runway, it would come to rest in the cold water surrounding Runway 13. The accident report, however, criticized the fact that the majority of the airplane operators in the United States relied only upon type I fluids for protection, and they do not use type II. The board stated that tests have shown that both fluids do flow off the wings of a treated airplane in significant amounts during the initial takeoff ground run. The NTSB stated:

There are a number of views on the potential uses of type I and II fluids. The use of type I fluid raises concern because its holdover time is shorter than the holdover time for type II fluid under certain conditions. Both fluids are under scrutiny for their environmental impacts, and it is uncertain if type II fluid diminishes the runway coefficient of friction since the fluid rolls off the airplane during the takeoff roll. Also, the use of either type fluid may result in a temporary degradation in the airplane's aerodynamic performance, a reduced stall margin, and an increase in drag.

=== Safety card errors ===
While it was not named as a cause of the accident, investigators also found that the passenger safety briefing cards in the airplane showed two types of galley service doors. However, only one door is installed on a particular Fokker 28 model at any one time. The examination also showed that the safety card did not show how to operate either of the two types of galley service doors in the emergency mode if the normal opening mode failed. However, the final report stated that this "did not contribute to the fatalities in the accident."

=== Conclusion ===
The final report, published by the NTSB, cited the probable cause of the accident to be:

... the failure of the airline industry and the Federal Aviation Administration to provide flight crews with procedures, requirements, and criteria compatible with departure delays in conditions conducive to airframe icing and the decision by the flight crew to take off without positive assurance that the airplane's wings were free of ice accumulation after 35 minutes of exposure to precipitation following deicing. The ice contamination on the wings resulted in an aerodynamic stall and loss of control after lift-off. Contributing to the cause of the accident were the inappropriate procedures used by, and inadequate coordination between, the flight crew that led to a takeoff rotation at a lower than prescribed air speed.

== Aftermath ==
=== NTSB recommendations ===
The NTSB made several recommendations to the FAA, including requiring that "flight crew members and appropriate ground personnel responsible for the inspection of transport-category airplanes for wing contamination receive specific periodic training that will illustrate what contamination looks like and feels like on a wing and the amount of contamination that is detectable under different light conditions". They also recommended "airlines to establish a way to inform flight crews of the type of [deicing] fluid and mixture used, the current moisture accumulation rate, and the available holdover time."

With regard to the obstructions with which the airplane collided during the accident sequence, the NTSB recommended the modification or replacement of "all pump houses adjacent to Runway 13/31 so that they are not obstructions to airplanes". They also recommended a study on the "feasibility of building a frangible ILS antenna array for LaGuardia Airport" Further, they recommended a review of Fokker 28 passenger-safety briefing cards "to ensure that they clearly and accurately depict the operation of the two types of forward cabin doors in both their normal and emergency modes and that they describe clearly and accurately how to remove the over-wing emergency exit and cover."

=== Dryden report allegations ===
The crash was featured on National Geographic Channel in an episode of the television program Mayday (Air Crash Investigation/Air Emergency) entitled Cold Case, where the accident was compared with Air Ontario Flight 1363, which crashed in Dryden, Ontario, after the crew did not deice their jet. The program opened by saying that Canadian investigators were "stunned" to hear of the USAir accident, as it mirrored the Air Ontario flight that had occurred three years earlier.

The report on the crash in Dryden criticized approaches to deicing. It made several points, including recommending the use of type II deicing fluid rather than type I, deicing trucks near the runway rather than at the gate, and that the crew should inspect their wings not only from the cockpit, but also the cabin. The report concluded that competitive pressures caused by commercial deregulation cut into safety standards, and that many of the industry's sloppy practices and questionable procedures were placing pilots in difficult situations.

Virgil P. Moshansky, who investigated the crash in Dryden and wrote the report, appeared in the documentary, alleging that if the recommendations in his report had been followed, the USAir accident could have been prevented. Moshansky told the documentary that his report "probably sat on somebody's [at the FAA] desk." He said, "when I first heard about it, I thought, my God, it's Dryden all over again ... certainly if they had followed the recommendations in my report, the F28 crash at LaGuardia could have been averted."

Another investigator into the Air Ontario accident told the documentary, "after all of this work [investigating the Dryden crash], after all of the efforts, to see it happen again was extremely frustrating." The documentary focused largely on these allegations, while also reconstructing the Air Ontario flight and the USAir flight. The FAA rejected Moshansky's allegations, and they claim that they never received his report.

On 31 March 1992, Gordon Haugh, a spokesman for the Commission of Inquiry into the crash in Dryden who initially claimed that the second interim report was sent to the FAA, admitted that it was not sent to them, only to the Prime Minister's office. However, the government never sent it to the ICAO, as it was supposed to, which would have made the report available to anyone in aviation.

=== International Conference on Airplane Ground Deicing ===
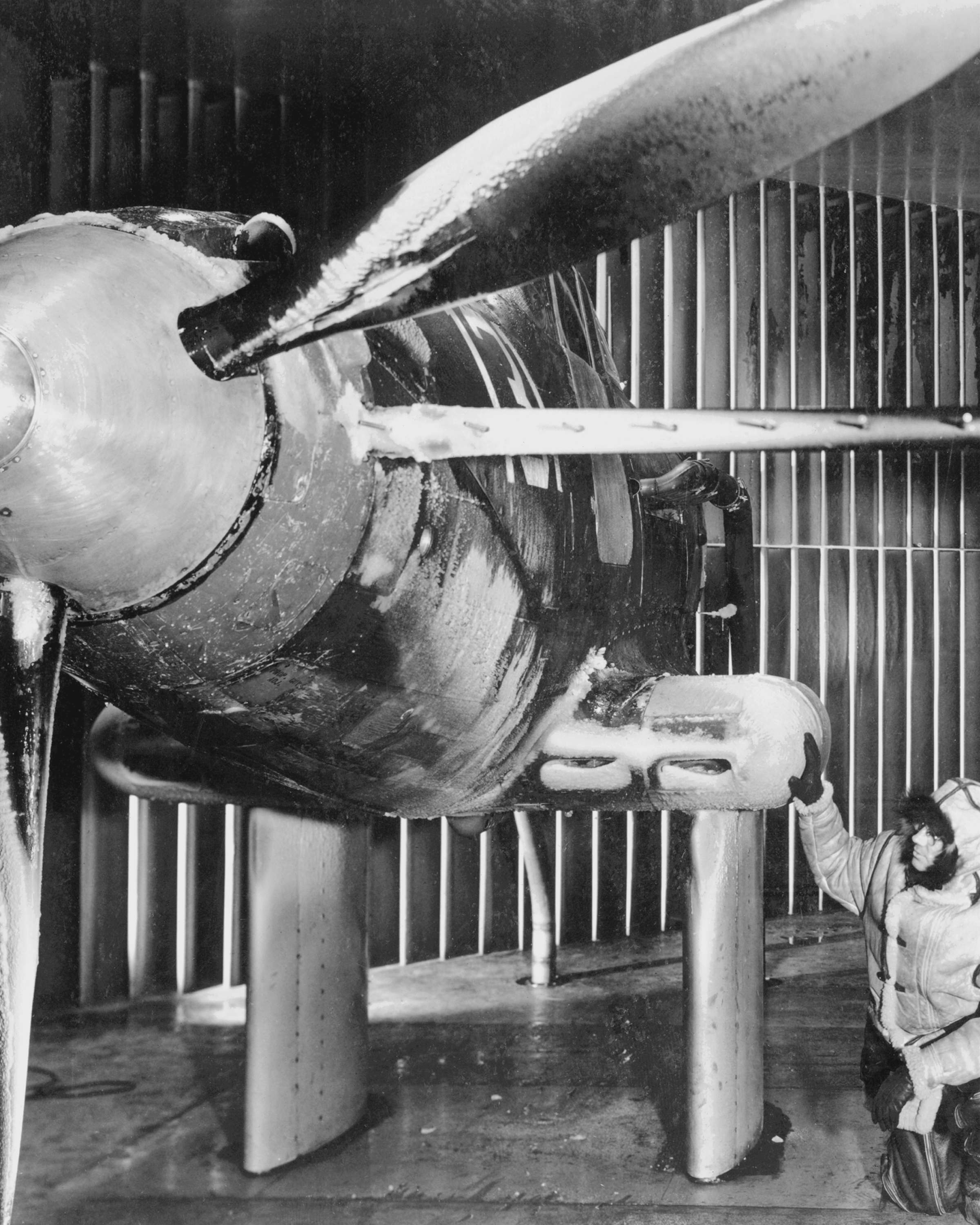
These ice formations on the propeller and fuselage surfaces of a test unit installed in the Icing Research Tunnel at the Aircraft Engine Research Laboratory of the National Advisory Committee for Aeronautics, Cleveland, Ohio, show what may happen to an aircraft in flight under certain atmospheric conditions.

Following the crash of Flight 405 and the Air Ontario accident in Dryden, the FAA began to research methods of improving deicing practices at airports to minimise the number of accidents caused by a buildup of ice.

Described by the FAA as a "sharply focused effort", experts convened on May 28 and 29, 1992, in Reston, Virginia for the International Conference on Ground Deicing. At the conference, industry methods were discussed and agreed upon for actions that should be taken in the long and short terms. A report on the conference by the FAA read:

A better understanding of airplane ground deicing and anti-icing issues is a crucial prerequisite to the implementation of feasible and effective safety improvements. To achieve this goal, the FAA sponsored a conference at which the international aviation community could exchange thoughts and offer recommendation on a variety of issues concerning safe winter operations. [At the conference] more than 750 participants discussed the problems posed by aircraft deicing and examined possible solutions.

Discussions over different types of deicing fluid reportedly were held, along with different deicing equipment and techniques. They also found that the pilot in command was the ultimate authority for takeoff decisions, but that all operators had to provide proper training and criteria for the pilot in command on which to base a proper decision.

The conference concluded with an amendment to FAA regulations under which air carriers operate. The new regulations stated that airlines should put in place FAA-approved ground deicing or anti-icing procedures anytime weather conditions of ice, snow, or frost prevailed. The new rules went into effect on November 1, 1992.

=== Developments in deicing ===
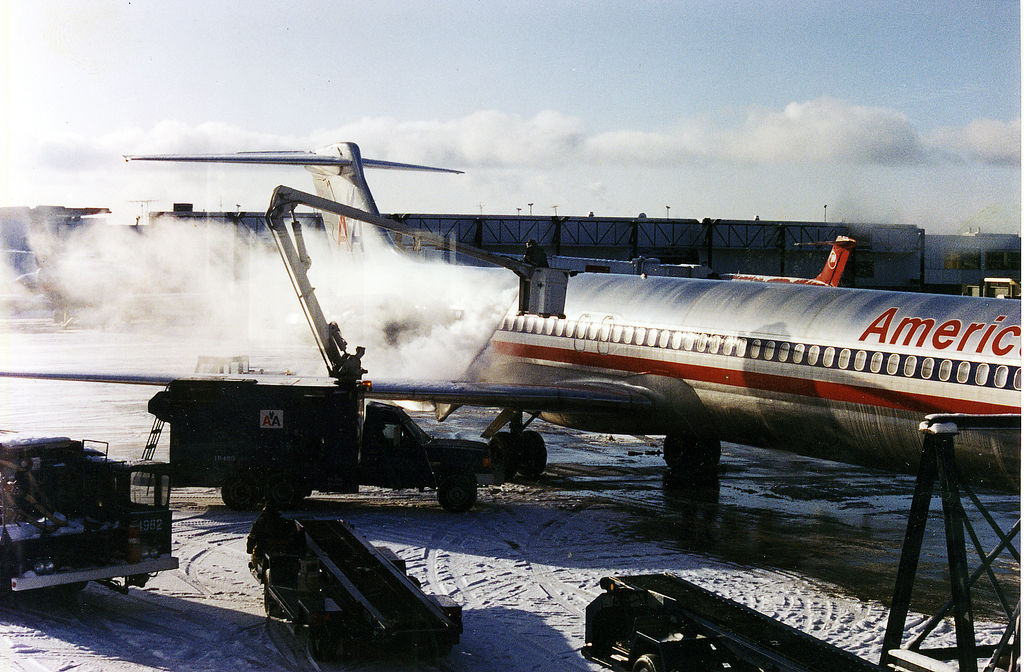
An American Airlines MD-80 aircraft being deiced at Syracuse Hancock International Airport

In the years that followed the accident, airlines started using type IV deicing fluid, which is more effective than both types I and II. Type IV fluids stick to aircraft for up to two hours. Chicago O'Hare International Airport was the first to introduce deicing facilities at the runway, something which has now become commonplace.

Aircraft now have more sophisticated deicing systems that can be used on the ground and in the air. Many modern civil fixed-wing transport aircraft, for example the Boeing 737, use anti-ice systems on the leading edge of wings, engine inlets, and air data probes, using warm air. This is bled from engines and is ducted into a cavity beneath the surface to be anti-iced. The warm air heats the surface up to a few degrees above freezing, preventing ice from forming. The system may operate autonomously, switching on and off as the aircraft enters and leaves icing conditions.

Ground deicing technologies are also developing, and a newer technology is infrared deicing. This is the transmission of energy by means of electromagnetic waves or rays. Infrared is invisible and travels in straight lines from the heat source to surfaces and objects without significantly heating the space (air) through which it passes. When infrared waves strike an object, they release their energy as heat. This heat is either absorbed or reflected by the cooler surface. Infrared energy is continually exchanged between "hot" and "cold" surfaces until all surfaces have reached the same temperature (equilibrium). The colder the surfaces, the more effective the infrared transfer from the emitter. This heat-transfer mechanism is substantially faster than conventional heat-transfer modes used by conventional deicing (convection and conduction) due to the cooling effect of the air on the deicing fluid spray.

Aircraft deicing vehicles have also improved since the accident, usually consisting of a large tanker truck, containing the concentrated deicing fluid, with a water feed to dilute the fluid according to the ambient temperature. The vehicle also normally has a cherry picker crane, allowing the operator to spray the entire aircraft in as little time as possible; an entire Boeing 737 can be treated in under 10 minutes by a single deicing vehicle. Airport runways are also deiced by sprayers fitted with long spraying arms. These arms are wide enough to cross the entire runway, and allow deicing of the entire airstrip to take place in a single pass, reducing the length of time that the runway is unavailable.

== Notable passengers ==
- Richard Lawson – film and television actor (survived accident)

== See also ==
- 1992 in aviation
- Aviation safety
- Icing conditions

=== Similar accidents ===
- Air Florida Flight 90 – crashed on January 13, 1982, after ice built up on the airframe of the jet because of pilot error.
- Ryan International Airlines Flight 590, a flight that crashed due to atmospheric icing, pilot error, and poor FAA oversight.
- Arrow Air Flight 1285 – crashed attempting to take off from Gander International Airport with contaminated wings on December 12, 1985.
- Continental Airlines Flight 1713, a case where a DC-9 failed to gain lift during takeoff due to ice on the wings. The crew made multiple errors that contributed to the crash, namely waiting too long to take off after deicing, taxiing without proper clearance, and pitching the plane's nose up too much on departure.
- Air France Flight 447 – crashed into the Atlantic Ocean due to pilot error when after ice built up on the aircraft's pitot tubes on June 1, 2009.
- Aero Trasporti Italiani Flight 460 – crashed after taking off from Lasnigo, Italy due to ice and snow accumulation on the wings on October 15, 1987
- Air Ontario Flight 1363 – crashed after taking off from Dryden Regional Airport due to ice and snow accumulation on the wings on March 10, 1989.
- American Eagle Flight 4184 – crashed after flying into unforeseen icing conditions on October 31, 1994.
- China Eastern Airlines Flight 5210 – crashed shortly after takeoff on November 21, 2004, after the jet collected a layer of frost overnight and was not deiced.
- Turkish Airlines Flight 301, another F28 that crashed due to icing and pilot errors.
- West Wind Aviation Flight 282, an ATR-42 crashed at Fond-du-Lac Airport, Saskatchewan due to ice on the wings on December 13, 2017, 600 m past the end of the runway.
