= Mark Genge =

Canadian Anglican bishop (1927–2018)

Mark Genge (18 March 1927 – 17 January 2018) was an Anglican bishop who was the Bishop of Central Newfoundland from 1976 until 1990.

Genge was educated at the Memorial University of Newfoundland and Durham University, where he gained an MA in Divinity. He was ordained in 1952. After a curacy at Stephenville he was Principal of Queen's College, Newfoundland. He was the Examining Chaplain to the Bishop of Newfoundland from 1957 to 1969. He held incumbencies at Foxtrap, Battle Harbour, Burgeo and Port de Grave. From 1973 until his elevation to the episcopate he was secretary of the Canadian Bible Society. He died in January 2018 at the age of 90.
