= Turkish Airlines Flight 301 =

Aviation accident in Turkey in 1974

Coordinates: 38°17′21″N 27°09′18″E

- The broken tail of the aircraft after the accident

Accident
- Date: 26 January 1974
- Summary: Stalled and crashed during takeoff
- Site: Izmir Cumaovası Airport, Cumaovası, Turkey

Aircraft
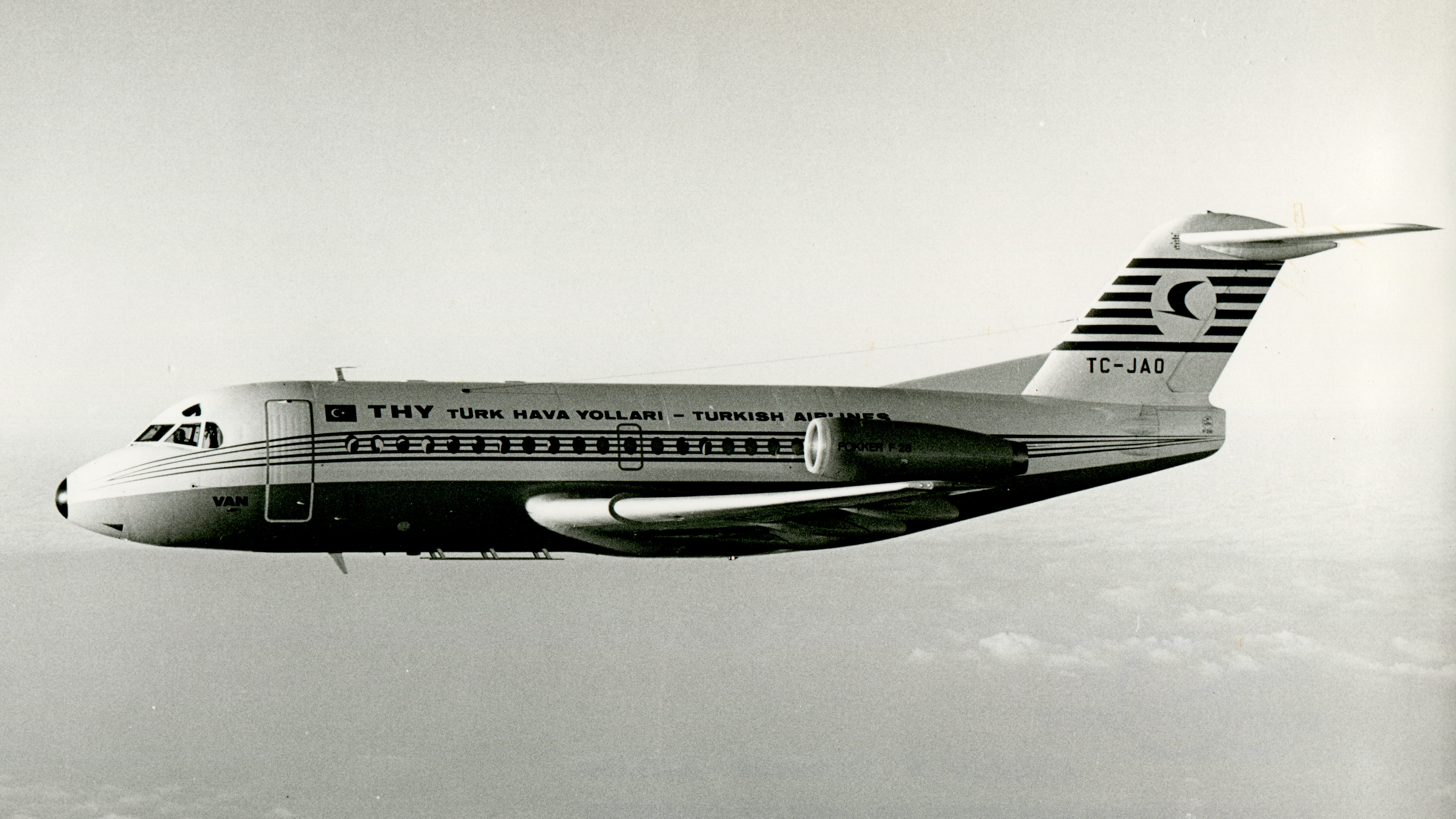
- TC-JAO, the aircraft involved in the accident, photographed in 1973
- Aircraft type: Fokker F28-1000 Fellowship
- Aircraft name: Van
- Operator: Turkish Airlines
- IATA flight No.: TK301
- ICAO flight No.: TKY301
- Call sign: TURKISH 301
- Registration: TC-JAO
- Flight origin: İzmir Cumaovası Airport, Turkey
- Destination: Istanbul Yeşilköy Airport, Turkey
- Occupants: 73
- Passengers: 68
- Crew: 5
- Fatalities: 67
- Injuries: 6
- Survivors: 6

Turkish Airlines Flight 301 was a passenger flight operated by a Fokker F28-1000 Fellowship of Turkish Airlines that crashed during takeoff at İzmir Cumaovası Airport on 26 January 1974 while en route to Istanbul Yeşilköy Airport, killing 67 of its 73 passengers and crew.

The aircraft spent the night prior to the accident outside in freezing temperatures, causing frost accumulation on the wings, which was unnoticed by the crew before departure. During takeoff, the pilots over-rotated the plane, causing it to stall, which together with the frost caused the aircraft to climb to just 8–10 metres (26–33 ft) before pitching down and veering left, crashing into the ground and subsequently catching fire.

In 1990, it was claimed that the accident was caused by two of the pilots being drunk. Autopsy results confirmed alcohol was found in the blood of the captain and flight engineer, but that it was not the cause of the accident.

== Aircraft and crew ==
The aircraft was a Fokker F28-1000 Fellowship registered as TC-JAO. It made its first flight on 5 September 1972, joined Turkish Airlines on 9 January 1973, and had flown for 2,269 hours over 3,133 flights prior to the accident. The Fokker F28 was named Van for the city Van; its airworthiness certificate was valid until 13 December 1974.

The captain and pilot in command of the flight was İlhan Günaydın (37). He was a former Turkish Air Force pilot who graduated from the air force academy in 1958. He flew 2,600 hours in military aircraft until he resigned and joined Turkish Airlines in 1970. He became a Fokker F28 captain in 1972 and had accumulated 577 flight hours on the type. The co-pilot was Kaya Günelgin (36). Günelgin was also a former air force pilot with 2,794 hours in military aircraft. He resigned from the air force in 1973 and joined Turkish Airlines. He had 395 flight hours with the Fokker F28. Flight engineer Erdal Parlakbilek was also present in the cockpit. There were two cabin crew members: Aynur Sürücü and Serap Özgenç.

A day before the accident, the same crew and aircraft had made the Izmir–Athens–Izmir flight without reporting any issues, and stayed at Izmir for the night. The captain's wife however, claimed that he had called her the night before and said: "the plane is defective, let's see what we will do." The same aircraft was "recently" forced to return to Van Ferit Melen Airport after take-off after one of its doors opened mid-flight. According to an unnamed Turkish Airlines official, a group of Dutch technicians came to Istanbul and performed maintenance on the aircraft to fix its issues "some time ago".

== Accident ==
The pilot in command, İlhan Günaydın, completed the pre-flight walk-around and the plane was ready for departure at 07:07 local time (05:07 GMT) to fly to Istanbul. The aircraft taxied to runway 35 and started its roll after receiving clearance from the tower to do so. The aircraft started lifting off after using 3,200 feet (980 m) of the runway and climbed to a maximum altitude of 8–10 metres (26–33 ft), after which it started banking to the left and pitching down. The left wing made contact with the ground first, followed by the left fuselage belly which struck the 50-centimetre (20 in) bank of a drainage ditch located 28 metres (92 ft) left of the runway. The impact ruptured the fuel tank located inside the left wing, causing the plane to catch fire. The plane started to break up as the tail section was separated first. The tail section overtook the fuselage and impacted it between the cockpit and the passenger cabin, causing them to disintegrate as well and turning the latter upside down. The nose section travelled further until it hit a stack of empty drums 2–3 metres (6.6–9.8 ft) tall and 150 metres (490 ft) away from the runway.

== Wreckage and recovery ==
External video
- Wreckage and Bodies in Turkish Plane Crash; The scene of the accident two days after the crash

Witnesses of the crash ran to the accident site to assist with the evacuation. The emergency services at the airport were already on stand-by when the aircraft started its engines and were quickly at the accident scene. Ten minutes later, a team of firefighters from Gaziemir Air Base and the city itself arrived to assist with the flames. The fire was extinguished within 30 minutes. The flight recorder was found in good condition.

The whole aircraft apart from the cockpit and tail sections was destroyed by the fire, which made it impossible to save all the occupants with facilities available at the airport. Minister of Transport Ferda Güley, who started his duty only a day prior to the accident, requested a brain surgeon for a critically injured crew member. Removal of the wreckage started on 28 January, the runway was cleared and the airport was opened on the same day.

== Victims ==
Most passengers on board the flight were Turkish immigrants living in Germany, who had been on leave from their work. Initial reports mentioned that 62 people perished; 51 died on-site, while 11 others, including all three pilots, died in hospital after being taken out of the wreckage in a critical condition. An additional passenger was reported dead on 1 February. Identification of the bodies was difficult as most were completely burnt and several bodies were melted into each other.

According to the final report, of the 68 passengers, 62 died; while six, including an infant, survived. Only one of the five crew members, Aynur Sürücü, survived the initial crash, but died later on 12 December 1975 due to her injuries. (Note: Sürücü was not listed as a fatality in the final report.) She had been in a vegetative state since the crash and was being treated in a hospital in Geneva, Switzerland until her death. Her family blamed the airline for "not caring for her".

Families of the victims received 50,000 Turkish lira as compensation from an insurance company. It was the worst accident involving a Fokker F28 and second-deadliest aviation accident in Turkey at that time. As of October 2023, it is the second-deadliest crash involving the type and the fifth-deadliest in the nation.

== Investigation ==
Newly elected Prime Minister Bülent Ecevit's first order in office was for the Minister of Transport to visit the accident scene and start an investigation to determine the cause. The day after the crash, a flight instructor on board as a passenger claimed that the plane rotated too early and stalled as a result. Five different commissions met with Güley on 27 January at Izmir. Güley announced after the meeting that both flight recorders were recovered and sent to Istanbul. The cockpit voice recorder in the aircraft was found to be defective as the device had not recorded anything; investigators were unable to listen to the tape, which only produced a whizzing sound.

On 12 March 1975, Gündüz Sevilgen, a member of the 15th Parliament of Turkey from the National Salvation Party, wrote several questions to the Grand National Assembly of Turkey related to Turkish Airlines, including the causes of accidents. He received a response from the Minister of Transport, Sabahattin Özbek, on 18 March. The response included a short list of causes of all Turkish Airlines crashes to date. The cause for Flight 301 was: "[t]ake off made with an out-of-limit take off angle and icing on the wing causing the plane to crash with a lack of speed."

=== Final report ===
The final report was translated to English and released by the International Civil Aviation Organization in 1977. After the crash, some aircraft components were sent to Rolls-Royce and Fokker for examination, which showed no failures with the respective parts. (Note: Parts sent to Rolls-Royce were: the fuel pumps, air flow controller, regulator, top temperature control actuator and low pressure governor. Parts sent to Fokker were: the lift dumper manifold, elevator booster unit, tension regulator, elevator gust lock unit, auto pilot elevator servo unit, stabilizer control unit, rudder control unit, L.H. aileron control unit and voice recorder tape.) According to the weather reports, it was 0 °C (32 °F) with 95% humidity during the night with the plane outside. Investigators determined that these conditions were enough for frost accretion on the wings and elevators, as had happened to another Fokker F28 the following day during similar conditions. This accretion was not noticed by the captain during his walk-around.

The probable cause mentioned in the final report was that "[t]he aircraft stalled on take-off due to over-rotation and frost accretion on the wings." Calculations based on temperature and load showed that the plane would have reached its takeoff speed after 2,800 feet (850 m) of runway. The flight data recorder showed that the plane rotated after a roll of 3,200 feet (980 m) at a speed of 124 knots (230 km/h). The speed increased up to 133 knots (246 km/h), but then dropped back to 124 knots while veering to the left. The investigators attributed this loss of speed to a "more than normal" angle of attack, meaning that the pilots over-rotated the aircraft, causing it to stall. The low altitude of the aircraft made it impossible for the pilots to recover. Had there been no frost accretion, the plane would have taken off safely despite the other factors.

=== 1990 claims ===
On 18 May 1990, Milliyet newspaper, based on the admissions made by Güley in his book Kendini Yaşamak: Anılar, reported that the cause of the accident was due to the pilots being drunk. Güley wrote that the autopsy revealed that both the captain and the flight engineer had alcohol in their blood. He stated that he kept the secret with Ecevit to not "lose the trust of the people", as an accident like this "would've left a black mark that Turkish Airlines wouldn't have been able to clear for years." Güley additionally stated that the emergency services at the airport were insufficient, which led to more deaths. The confession caused the topic of the crash to be taken to the Grand National Assembly of Turkey, where Minister of Transport Cengiz Tuncer revealed the state archives related to the crash. The documents confirmed that captain Günaydın had 242 mg/kg of alcohol in his blood while flight engineer Parlakbilek had 26 mg/kg. According to the documents, alcohol consumption by the pilots was not associated with the cause of the crash.

== See also ==
- USAir Flight 405
- Air Florida Flight 90
- Air Ontario Flight 1363
