= Don Young (bishop) =

Bishop

Donald Arthur Young was the third bishop of Central Newfoundland: he held the See from 2001 until 2004.

Young was born in 1944 and educated at the Atlantic School of Theology and ordained in 1977. His first post was a curacy at Buchans.
