= John Watton =

Canadian Anglican bishop

John Watton is a Canadian Anglican bishop.

Watton is from Glenwood, Newfoundland and Labrador. He was educated at Queen's College, Newfoundland. Watton was a mechanic before his call to ordination. His first post was at Fortune, Newfoundland and Labrador-Lamaline. He has also served at Gander.

Church of England titles
Preceded by David Torraville	Bishop of Central Newfoundland; 2016-	Succeeded by Incumbent
