= Diocese of Central Newfoundland =

Diocese of the Anglican Church in Canada

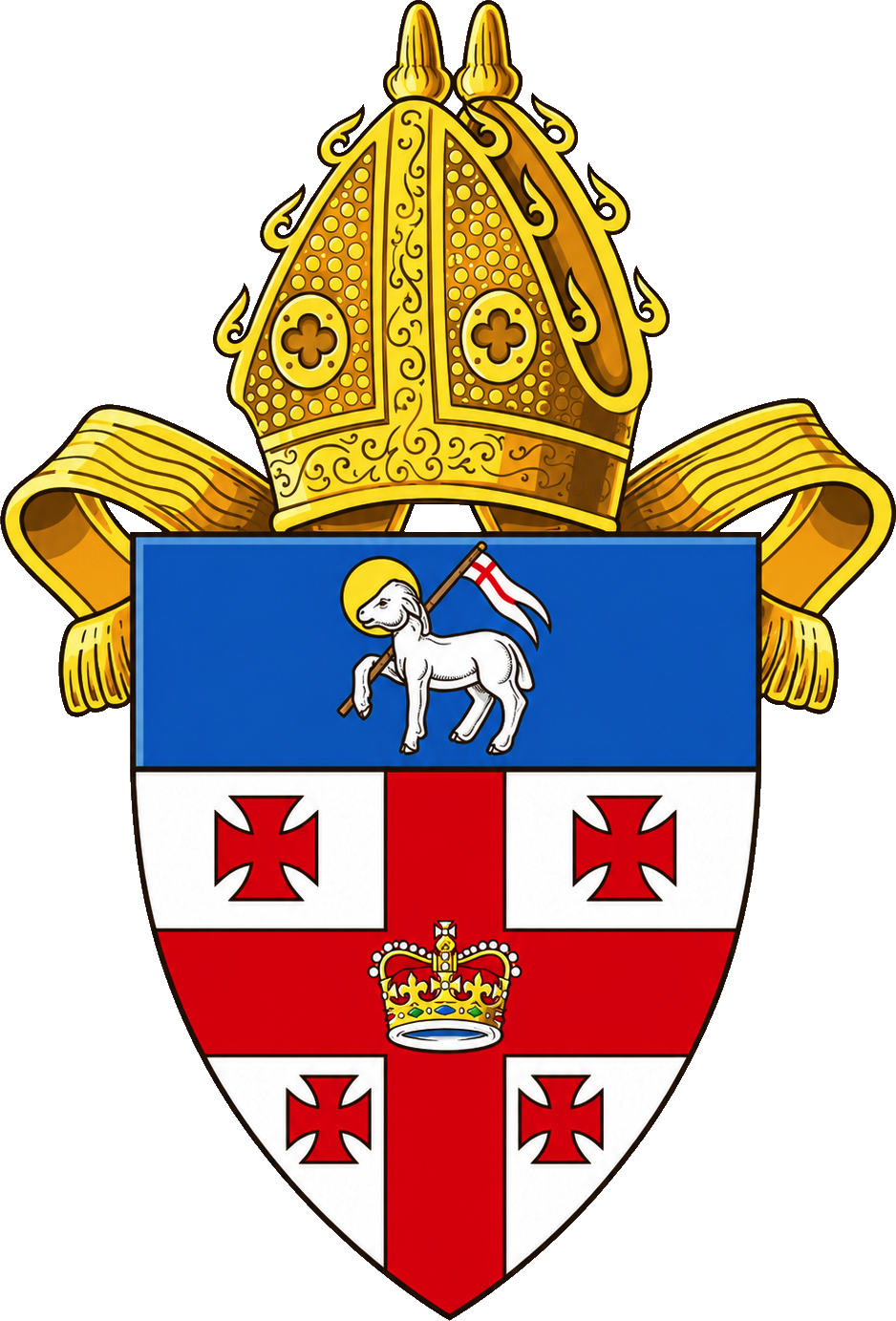

Location
- Ecclesiastical province: Canada

Statistics
- Parishes: 27 (2022)
- Members: 9,375 (2022)

Information
- Rite: Anglican
- Cathedral: St. Martin's Cathedral, Gander

Current leadership
- Bishop: The Rt. Rev. John Edwin Watton

Map
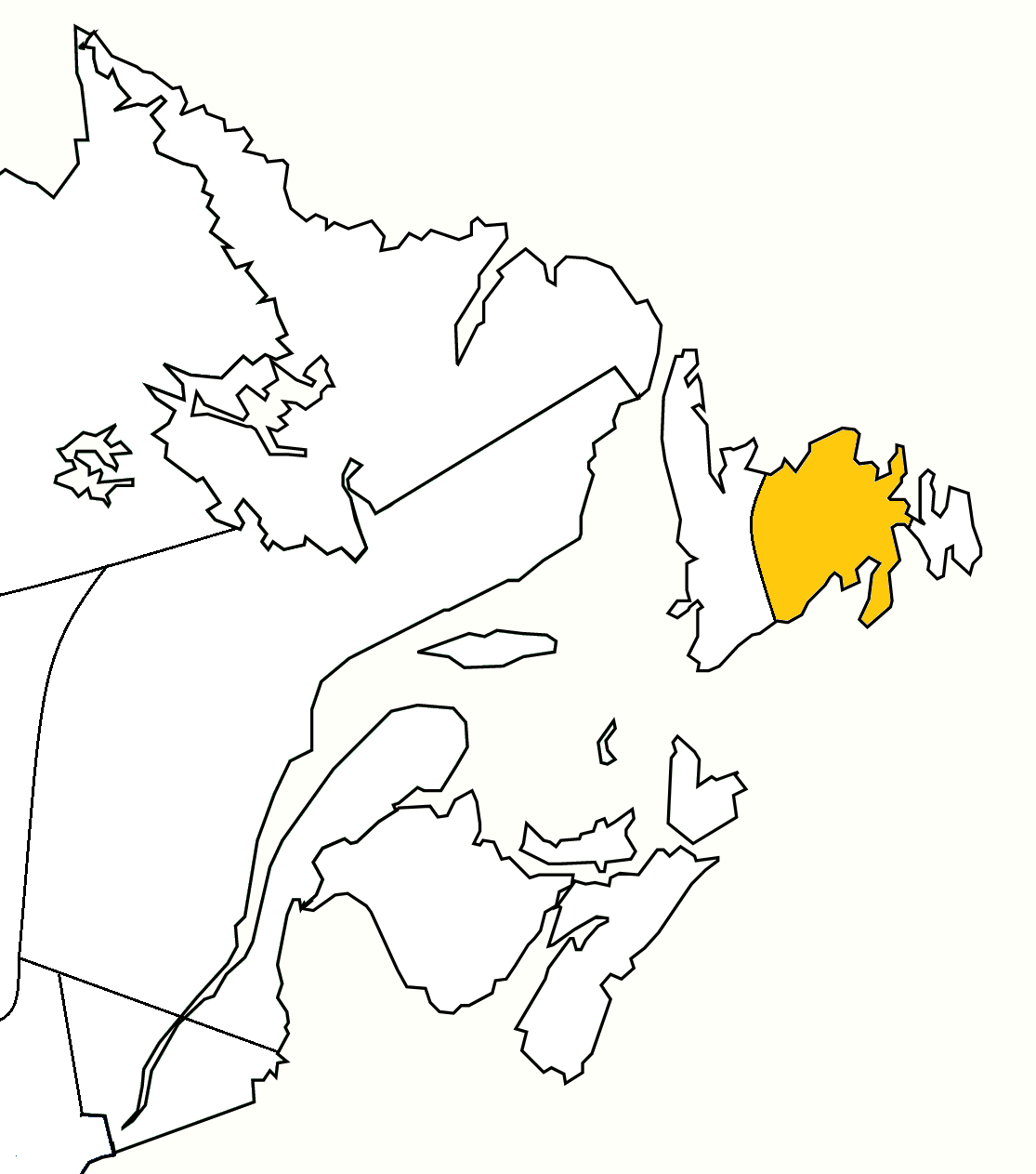
- Boundaries of the diocese within the Ecclesiastical Province of Canada

Website
- centraldiocese.ca

The Diocese of Central Newfoundland is part of the Anglican Church of Canada and was brought about by The Restructuring of the Diocese of Newfoundland Act, 1975. The Diocese of Eastern Newfoundland and Labrador and the Diocese of Western Newfoundland were also part of the restructuring of the previous Diocese of Newfoundland into three dioceses. Based on the last available information from 2022, the diocese has an Anglican population of 9,375 souls on the rolls of 27 parishes, with 18 paid priests in parish ministry, one unpaid priest, two paid deacons, and six unpaid deacons.

As of 2019, this Diocese allows clergy to officiate same-sex marriages.

== Bishops ==
- Mark Genge, 1976–1990
- Edward Frank "Eddie" Marsh, 1990–2000
- Donald A. "Don" Young, 2001–2004
- (Frederick) David Torraville (2005–2016)
- John Edwin Watton (2016–present)
