= David Torraville =

David Torraville served as the Bishop of Central Newfoundland from 2005 until 2016.

Torraville was educated at Memorial University. He was a teacher for five years before being ordained in 1986. He was a Curate at Twillingate and then the incumbent at St. Martin's Cathedral, Gander.
