= Arrow Air Flight 1285R =

1985 aviation accident in Canada

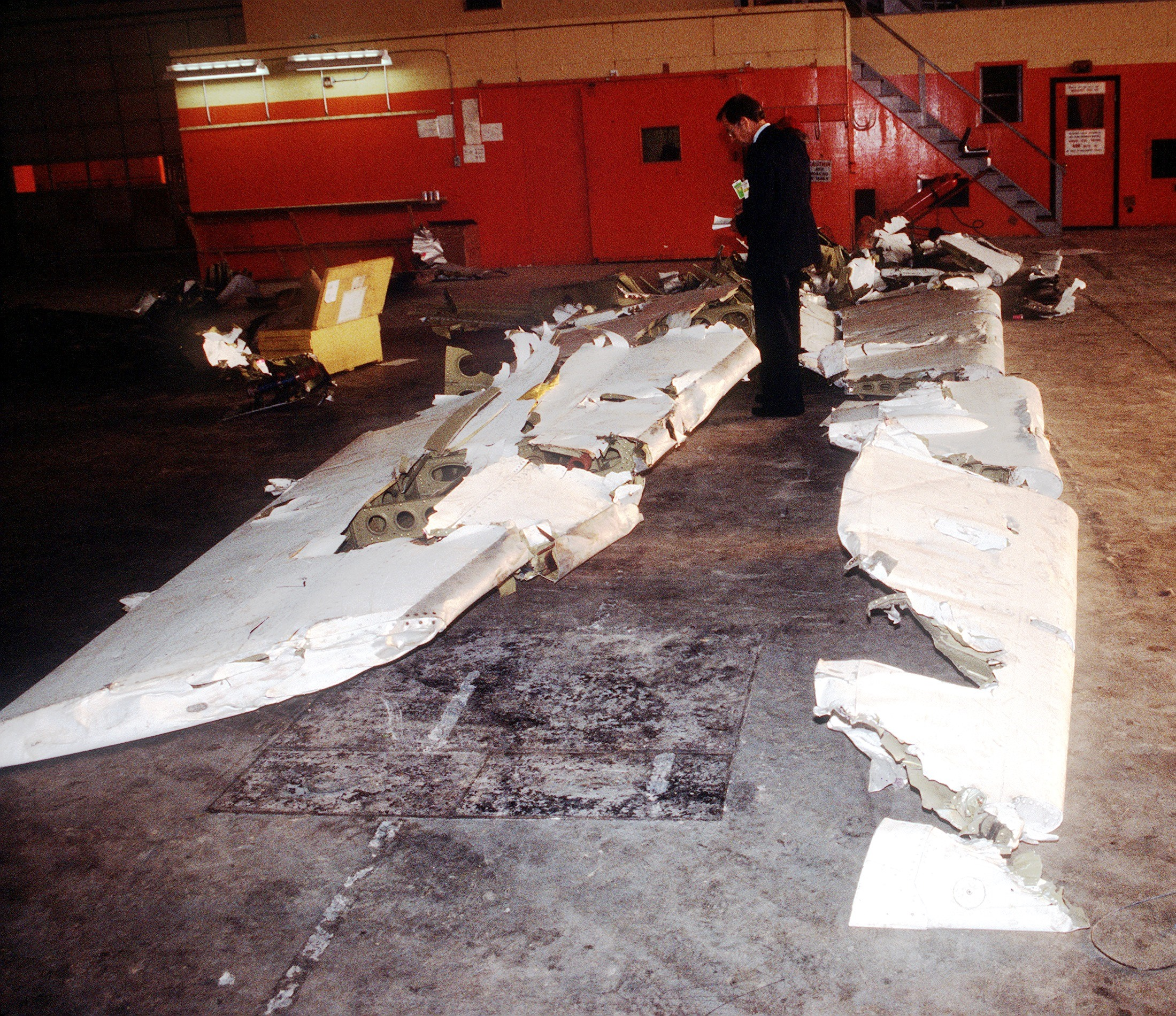
- Wreckage from the aircraft in storage at Gander International Airport

Accident
- Date: 12 December 1985
- Summary: Atmospheric icing and overloading leading to stall; cause disputed
- Site: Gander International Airport, Newfoundland, Canada; 48°54′43″N 54°34′27″W

Aircraft
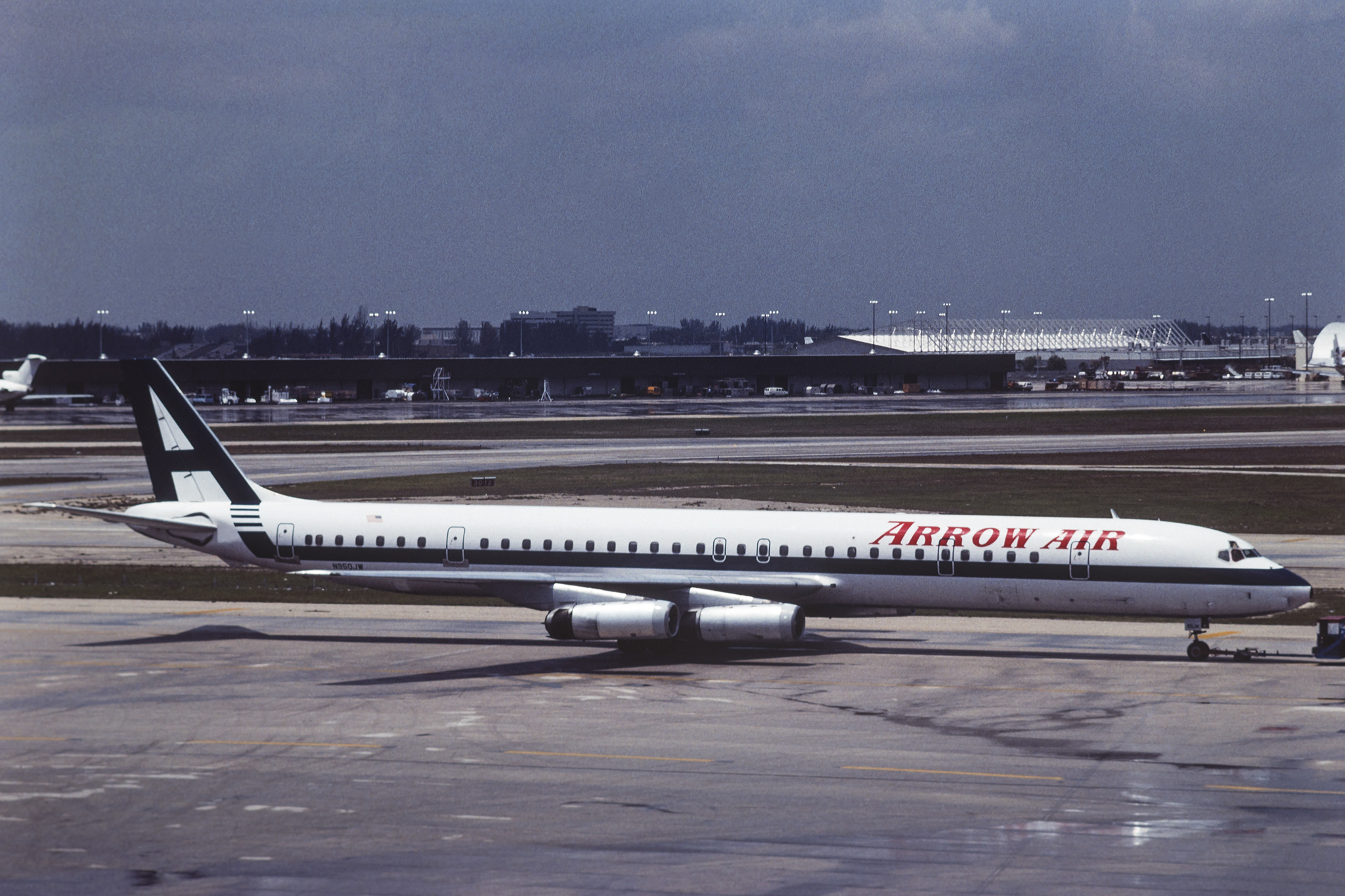
- N950JW, the aircraft involved in the accident, seen in May 1985
- Aircraft type: McDonnell Douglas DC-8-63CF
- Operator: Arrow Air
- IATA flight No.: MF1285R
- ICAO flight No.: APW950
- Call sign: BIG-A 950
- Registration: N950JW
- Flight origin: Cairo International Airport, Egypt
- 1st stopover: Cologne Bonn Airport, North Rhine-Westphalia, West Germany
- Last stopover: Gander International Airport, Newfoundland, Canada
- Destination: Campbell Army Airfield, Kentucky, United States
- Occupants: 256
- Passengers: 248
- Crew: 8
- Fatalities: 256
- Survivors: 0

Arrow Air Flight 1285R was an international charter flight carrying U.S. Army personnel from Cairo, Egypt, to their home base in Fort Campbell, Kentucky, US, via Cologne, West Germany, and Gander, Newfoundland. On the morning of Thursday, 12 December 1985, shortly after takeoff from Canada's Gander International Airport en route to Fort Campbell, the Douglas DC-8 serving the flight stalled, crashed, and burned about half a mile from the runway, killing all 248 passengers and 8 crew members on board. As of 2026, it is the deadliest aviation accident to occur on Canadian soil. At the time of the crash, it was the deadliest aviation accident involving a DC-8; its death toll was surpassed by the crash of Nigeria Airways Flight 2120 nearly six years later.

The accident was investigated by the Canadian Aviation Safety Board (CASB), which determined that the probable cause of the crash was the aircraft's unexpectedly high drag and reduced lift condition, most likely due to ice contamination on the wings' leading edges and upper surfaces, as well as underestimated onboard weight. A minority report stated that the accident could have been caused by an onboard explosion of unknown origin before impact, with one of these dissenting investigators later telling a United States congressional committee that a thin layer of ice could not bring down the aircraft. The dissenting report led to delays in changes to de-icing procedures, and a thin layer of ice caused the deadly crashes of Air Ontario Flight 1363 in Canada in 1989 and USAir Flight 405 in 1992.

In response to lack of confidence in accident investigations by the CASB, the Government of Canada shut the board down in 1990, replacing it with an independent, multi-modal investigative agency – the Transportation Safety Board of Canada.

== Accident ==
The aircraft, a McDonnell Douglas DC-8-63CF, was chartered to carry U.S. Army personnel, all but 12 of them members of the 101st Airborne Division, back to their base in Fort Campbell, Kentucky. They had completed a six-month deployment in the Sinai, in the Multinational Force and Observers peacekeeping mission. The DC-8 involved in the accident (registration N950JW) was manufactured in 1969, and was first delivered to Eastern Air Lines and then leased to other airlines before being leased to Arrow Air under its owner/parent company, International Air Leases.

The flight was made up of three legs, with refuelling stops in Cologne and Gander. The aircraft departed Cairo at 20:35 UTC on Wednesday 11 December 1985, and arrived at Cologne on Thursday 12 December 1985, at 01:21 UTC.

A new flight crew, consisting of Captain John Griffin and First Officer Joseph Connelly (both 45), and Flight Engineer Michael Fowler (48), boarded the aircraft before it departed for Gander at 02:50 UTC. The aircraft arrived at Gander International Airport at 09:04, where passengers departed the aircraft while the aircraft was refuelled. Witnesses reported that the flight engineer conducted an external inspection of the aircraft, after which the passengers re-boarded the aircraft.

The DC-8 began its takeoff roll on runway 22 from the intersection of runway 13 at 10:15 UTC (06:45 NST). It rotated near taxiway A, 51 seconds after brake release, at an airspeed of about 167 knots (309 km/h; 192 mph) IAS. Witnesses reported the aircraft showed difficulty gaining altitude after rotation. Once airborne, the airspeed reached 172 knots (319 km/h; 198 mph) IAS before decreasing again, causing the DC-8 to descend. After crossing the Trans-Canada Highway, located about 900 feet (270 m) from the departure end of runway 22, at a very low altitude, the aircraft's pitch increased, and it continued to descend.

Witnesses driving on the highway stated that they saw a bright glow emanating from the aircraft before it struck terrain just short of Gander Lake and crashed approximately 3,500 feet (1,100 m) beyond the departure end of the runway. Flight 1285R broke up, struck an unoccupied shed and exploded; this started an intense fire fed by the large amount of fuel carried on board for the final leg of the flight. All 248 passengers and 8 crew aboard died in the crash. Autopsy reports show that most on board did not actually die on impact, but rather minutes later in the fire.

== Investigation ==
The Canadian Aviation Safety Board (CASB) investigated the crash and, in a report signed by five of its nine board members, found that during its approach toward Gander, precipitation conditions were favourable for the formation of ice on the aircraft's wings. After landing, it continued to be exposed to "freezing and frozen precipitation capable of producing roughening on the wing upper surface" in addition to the freezing temperature. They also found that prior to takeoff the aircraft had not been de-iced. The board issued the following probable cause statement in its final report:

The Canadian Aviation Safety Board was unable to determine the exact sequence of events that led to this accident. The Board believes, however, that the weight of evidence supports the conclusion that, shortly after lift-off, the aircraft experienced an increase in drag and reduction in lift that resulted in a stall at low altitude from which recovery was not possible. The most probable cause of the stall was determined to be ice contamination on the leading edge and upper surface of the wing. Other possible factors such as a loss of thrust from the number four engine and inappropriate takeoff reference speeds may have compounded the effects of the contamination.

Four (of nine) members of the CASB dissented, issuing a minority opinion asserting that there was no evidence presented proving that ice had been present on leading edges such as the wings, and the minority report speculated that "An in-flight fire that may have resulted from detonations of undetermined origin brought about catastrophic system failures."

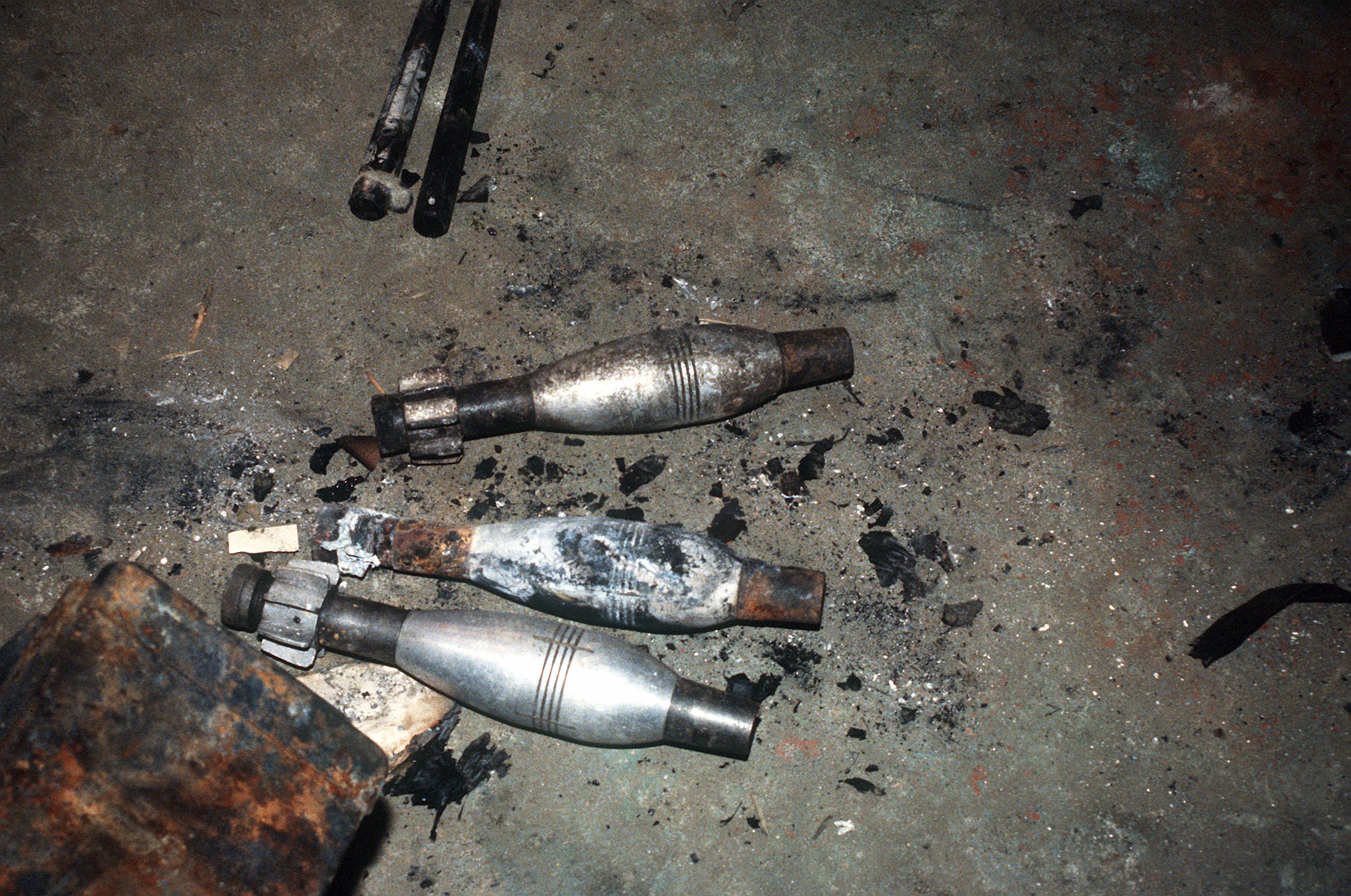
Mortar shells were recovered from the wreckage, which the dissenting members of the CASB later used as a possible explanation for the crash

The report also noted the inadequacy of the data from the antiquated foil-tape flight data recorder, which recorded only airspeed, altitude, heading, and vertical acceleration forces. The plane also took off with a non-functioning cockpit area microphone. There were no steps on any of the standard checklists to test the microphone's functionality, despite the existence of a button in the cockpit for that sole purpose. The defect went undetected for an indeterminate number of flights leading up to the accident flight, and thus the cockpit voice recorder (CVR) did not record any useful data.

Willard Estey, a former Supreme Court of Canada judge, submitted a review of the CASB report in 1989, ruling that the available evidence did not support either conclusion. Estey reviewed the report with a standard of reasonable doubt as used in courts of law, rather than a preponderance of available evidence as used by investigators to make their conclusions. As a result, the Canadian public's confidence in the CASB was undermined. The federal government responded by creating the Transportation Safety Board of Canada.

== Aftermath ==
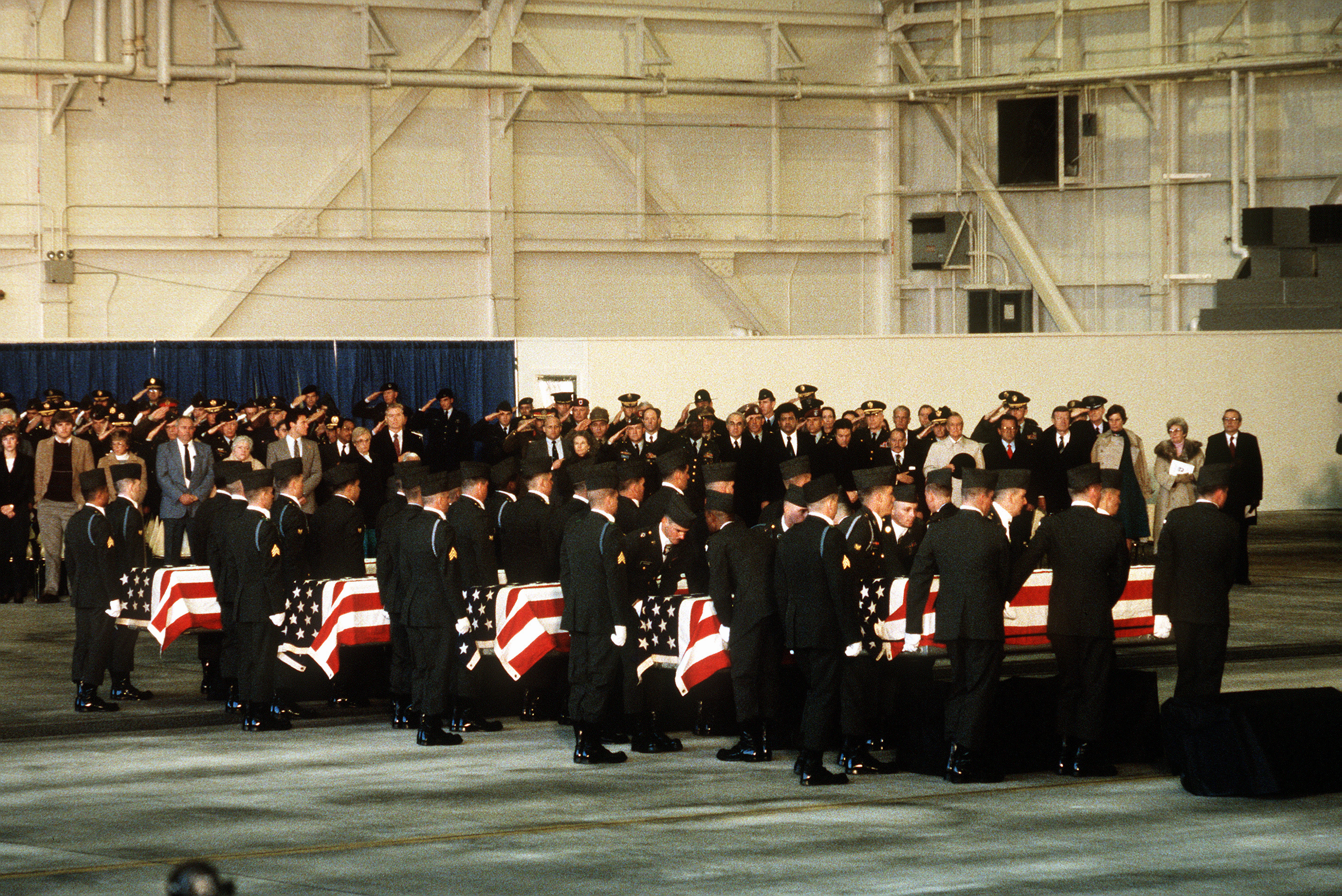
Caskets being carried in for a memorial service at Dover AFB on 16 December 1985

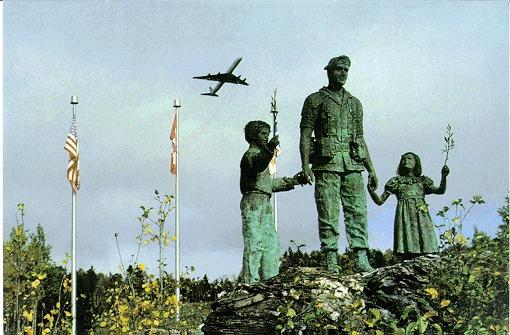
The "Silent Witness" by Kentucky artist Steve Shields. Arrow Air Flight 1285R memorial at Gander Lake, with a DC-8 taking off in the background

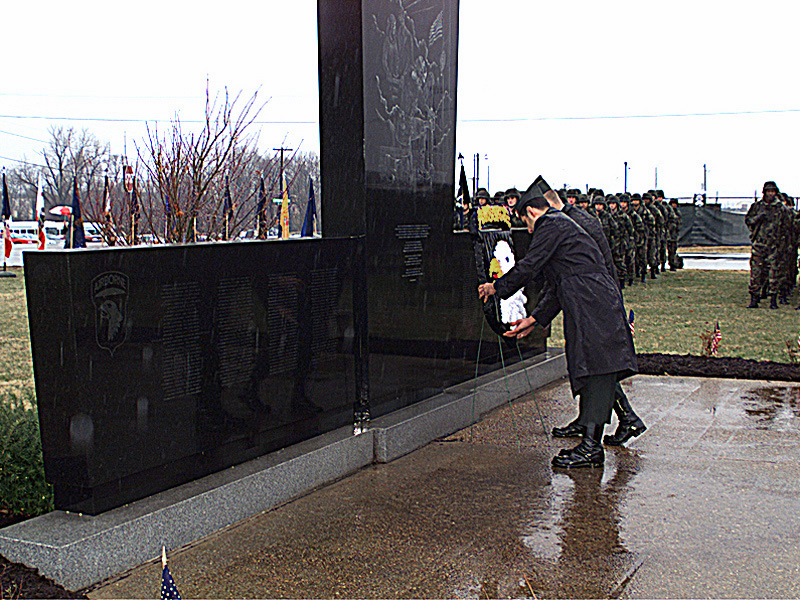
Arrow Air Flight 1285R memorial in Fort Campbell, Kentucky

On the day of the crash, responsibility was claimed by the Islamic Jihad Organization (de-facto part of Hezbollah). Islamic Jihad had already claimed responsibility for the 1983 Beirut barracks bombings that killed more than 200 American Marines. The claim was dismissed by the Canadian and U.S. governments soon after. According to United Press International, "Hours after the crash the Islamic Jihad – a Shiite Muslim extremist group – claimed it destroyed the plane to prove [its] ability to strike at the Americans anywhere." Pentagon and Canadian government officials rejected the claim, made by an anonymous caller to a French news agency in Beirut.

The death toll of all 256 people on board – 248 U.S. servicemen and 8 crew members, still constitutes the deadliest plane crash in Canada, and the U.S. Army's single deadliest air crash in peacetime.

Of the 248 servicemen, all but twelve were members of 101st Airborne Division (Air Assault), most of whom were from the 3rd Battalion, 502nd Infantry; eleven were from other Forces Command units; and one was an agent from the Criminal Investigations Command (CID).

On 16 December 1985, President Ronald Reagan, accompanied by the First Lady Nancy Reagan, attended a memorial service at Fort Campbell, Kentucky, where he said:

"Some people think of members of the military as only warriors, fierce in their martial expertise. But the men and women we mourn today were peacemakers. They were there to protect life and preserve a peace, to act as a force for stability and hope and trust. Their commitment was as strong as their purpose was pure. And they were proud. They had a rendezvous with destiny and a potential they never failed to meet. Their work was a perfect expression of the best of the Judeo-Christian tradition. They were the ones of whom Christ spoke when He said, 'Blessed are the peacemakers: for they shall be called the children of God'."

A memorial to the 256 victims at the crash site overlooks Gander Lake, and another memorial was erected at Fort Campbell. There is also a Memorial Park in Hopkinsville, Kentucky, just north of Fort Campbell. As of 2018, the scar from the crash is still visible from the ground and by satellite.

The dissenting report led to delays in changes to de-icing procedures, later made after a thin layer of ice caused the deadly crash of Air Ontario Flight 1363 in Canada in 1989. In response to lack of confidence in accident investigations by the CASB, the government of Canada shut down the board in 1990, replacing it with an independent, multi-modal investigative agency – the Transportation Safety Board of Canada.

== In popular culture ==
The mystery crime series Unsolved Mysteries explores speculation about the crash in season 5 episode 30 (aired on 5 May 1993)

The television documentary series Mayday featured the Flight 1285R crash and investigation in season 11 episode 3 titled "Split Decision" (aired on 26 August 2011) which included interviews with accident investigators and a dramatic recreation of the accident.

== See also ==
- Ukrainian-Mediterranean Airlines Flight 4230
