= Virgil P. Moshansky =

Justice of the Court of Queen's Bench of Alberta

Virgil P. Moshansky CM, KC
- Born: September 14, 1928 (age 97); Lamont, Alberta, Canada
- Occupations: Justice of the Court of King's Bench of Alberta; Mayor of Vegreville, Alberta; Lawyer
- Known for: Judicial inquiry into Air Ontario Flight 1363
- Awards: Order of Canada (2004); Transport Canada Aviation Safety Award (1995)

Virgil P. Moshansky, CM, KC, LL.B. (born September 14, 1928) is a Canadian judge. Born in Lamont, Alberta, he is a former Justice of the Court of Queen's Bench of Alberta and a former mayor of Vegreville, Alberta.

== Air Ontario Flight 1363 ==
On March 10, 1989, Air Ontario Flight 1363 crashed near Dryden, Ontario. Moshansky presided over the judicial inquiry. His report showed that competitive pressures caused by commercial deregulation cut into safety standards and that many of the industry's sloppy practices and questionable procedures placed the pilot in a very difficult situation, and the aircraft should not have been scheduled to refuel at an airport which did not have proper equipment and that neither training nor manuals had sufficiently warned the pilot of the dangers of ice on the wings of the Fokker F-28.

== Transport Canada 1995 Aviation Safety Award ==
For his role in the investigation, Moshansky was awarded the 1995 Transport Canada Aviation Safety Award during the 7th Annual Aviation Safety Seminar, held in Vancouver, British Columbia on April 25–26, 1995.

== Order of Canada ==
On October 29, 2004, he was named a member of the Order of Canada. He was invested as a member of the Order of Canada on June 10, 2005.

== Litco Law ==
On January 13, 2017, Virgil P. Moshansky joined Litco Law, Barristers and Solicitors, as counsel. Litco Law is based in Calgary, Alberta.
