= Eddie Marsh (bishop) =

Canadian bishop

Edward Frank (Eddie) Marsh was the second bishop of Central Newfoundland: he held the see from 1990 until 2000.

Marsh was educated at Dalhousie University and ordained in 1960. He was a curate at Corner Brook and then held incumbencies at Harbour Breton, Wickford, Indian Bay, St John's and Cartwright.

Bishop Edward Marsh died 28 Jun 2023.
