= Air Ontario Flight 1363 =

1989 aviation accident in Canada

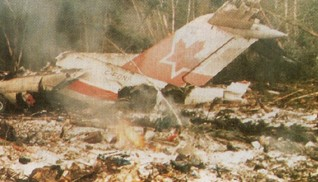
- Wreckage of the tail section

Accident
- Date: 10 March 1989
- Summary: Crashed on take-off in icing conditions
- Site: Dryden Regional Airport, Dryden, Ontario, Canada; 49°50′20″N 92°46′01″W

Aircraft
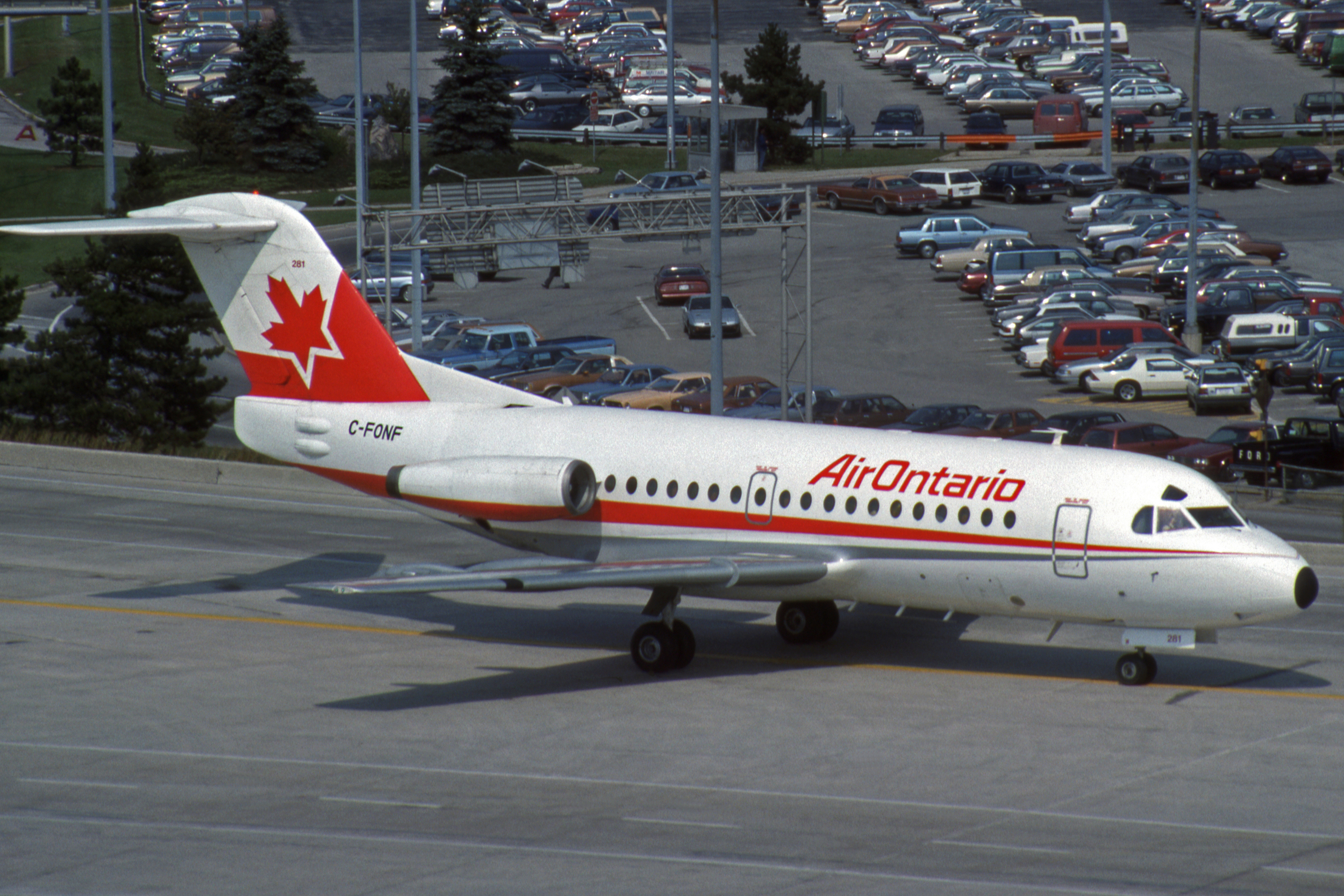
- C-FONF, the aircraft involved in the accident, photographed in 1988
- Aircraft type: Fokker F28-1000 Fellowship
- Operator: Air Ontario
- IATA flight No.: AE1363
- ICAO flight No.: MDA1363
- Call sign: ONTARIO 1363
- Registration: C-FONF
- Flight origin: Thunder Bay Int'l Airport
- Stopover: Dryden Regional Airport
- Destination: Winnipeg James Armstrong Richardson Int'l Airport
- Occupants: 69
- Passengers: 65
- Crew: 4
- Fatalities: 24
- Injuries: 42
- Survivors: 45

Air Ontario Flight 1363 was a scheduled Air Ontario passenger flight which crashed near Dryden, Ontario, Canada, on 10 March 1989 shortly after takeoff from Dryden Regional Airport. The aircraft was a Fokker F28-1000 Fellowship twin jet. It crashed after only 49 seconds because it was not able to attain sufficient altitude to clear the trees beyond the end of the runway, due to a buildup of ice and snow on the wings.

== Aircraft and crew ==
The aircraft, a Fokker F28-1000, had been manufactured in 1972 and had been in service for Turkish Airlines from 1973 to 1987. The aircraft had been delivered to Air Ontario in November 1987. It was one of two F28-1000s operated by the airline.

The flight was under the command of veteran pilot Captain George Morwood (52). He was an experienced airman who had been flying for approximately 34 years with Air Ontario. He had roughly 24,100 flying hours. His first officer was Keith Mills (35), also a highly experienced pilot with Air Ontario for 10 years, having accrued more than 10,000 hours of flying time. However, both pilots were new to the F28-1000, having flown fewer than 150 hours between them on the aircraft type.

== Accident ==
The flight had departed from Thunder Bay bound for Winnipeg with an intermediate stop in Dryden, where the aircraft struck trees shortly after takeoff and then disintegrated on impact. The accident caused the deaths of 21 of the 65 passengers and three of the four crew members on board, including both pilots.

== Investigation ==
The fierce post-crash fire resulted in severe damage to both the cockpit voice recorder and the flight data recorder; neither of these units could be read as a result. Because of this, the investigative effort relied almost entirely on witness statements regarding the crash and the events leading up to it.

The investigation revealed that an unserviceable auxiliary power unit (APU), and no available external power unit at Dryden Regional Airport, led to questionable decision-making, which was a critical factor leading to the crash of Flight 1363. If the engines had been turned off, they could not have been restarted again due to the unserviceability of the APU and lack of external power, thus grounding the aircraft until an external power cart could be flown in from Winnipeg the next day. Therefore, the port engine was left running during the stopover in Dryden.

Snow was falling gently that afternoon and a layer of 0.6 to 1.3 cm (0.24 to 0.51 in) of snow had accumulated on the wings. The wings needed to be deiced before takeoff, but the Fokker F28 aircraft is never supposed to be deiced while the engines are running because of a risk of toxic fumes entering the cabin of the aircraft. The pilot, therefore, did not request to have the wings deiced; at the time, airline instructions were unclear on this point, but the subsequent report was very critical of this decision.

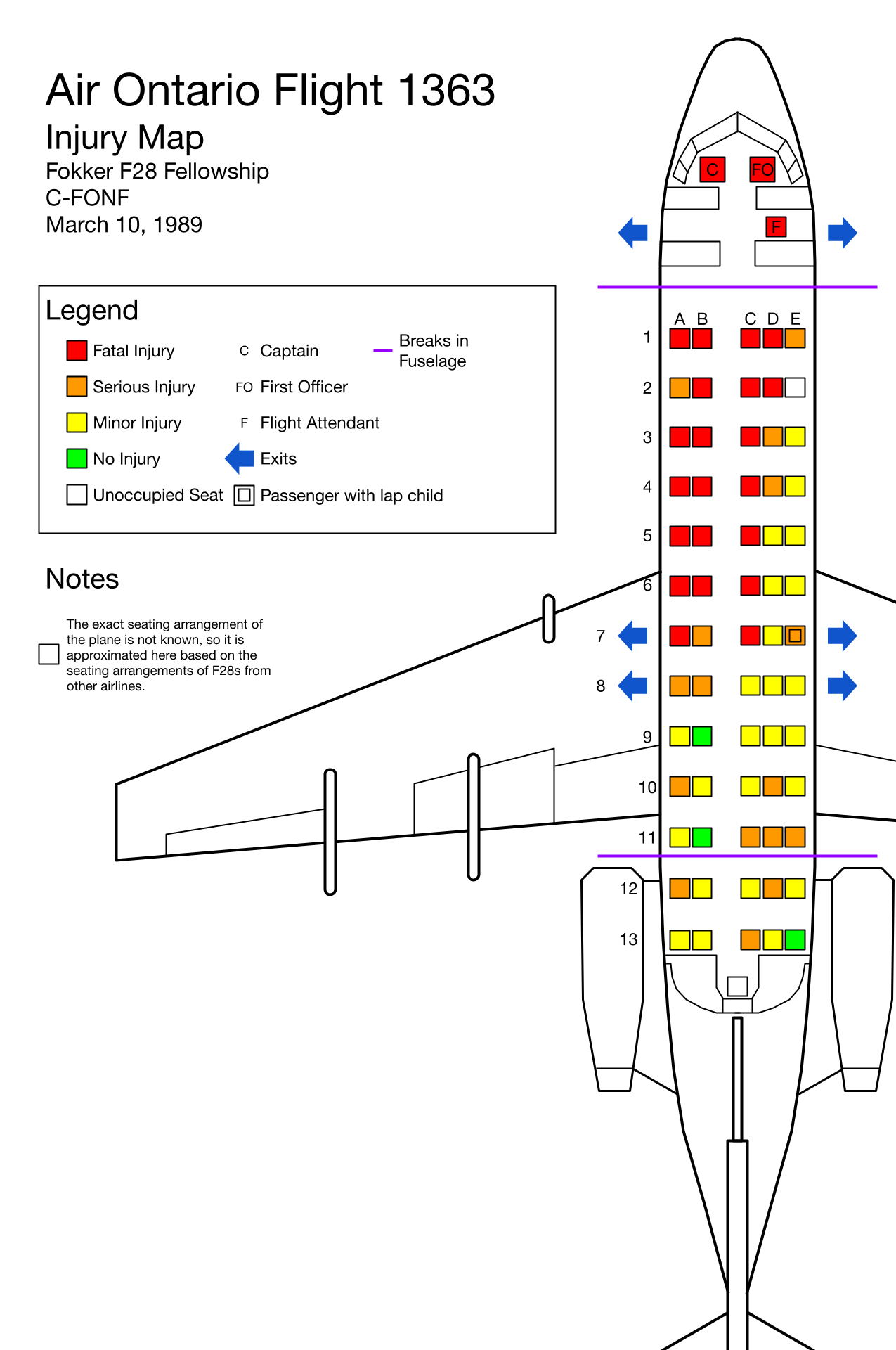
Injury map of Air Ontario Flight 1363

Fuel needed to be loaded and was done with the engine running while passengers were on board (known as a hot refuel). Off-loading and reloading passengers would have taken considerable time, and the longer the aircraft stayed on the ground, the greater was the need for the wings to be sprayed with deicing fluid. To prevent further delay and a greater possibility of a buildup on the wings, Captain Morwood decided to have the aircraft fueled while the engine was running and with passengers on board. This procedure was not then, and is not now, prohibited by Transport Canada. Airline instructions were also inconsistent.

== Result ==
The accident investigation was subsumed into a judicial inquiry under a judge, Virgil P. Moshansky. His report showed that competitive pressures caused by commercial deregulation cut into safety standards, with the management team of Air Ontario adopting many of the industry's sloppy practices and questionable procedures, placing the pilot in a very difficult situation. The report also stated that Air Ontario should not have scheduled the aircraft to refuel at an airport that did not have proper equipment, and that neither of Air Ontario's training nor manuals had sufficiently warned the pilot of the dangers of ice on the wings. Moshansky also blamed Transport Canada for letting Air Ontario expand into the operation of bigger, more complicated aircraft without detecting the deficiencies of their existing aircraft.

After the crash of Air Ontario Flight 1363, many significant changes were made to the Canadian Aviation Regulations. These included new procedures regarding refueling and deicing, as well as many new regulations intended to improve the general safety of all future flights in Canada. Specifically, these referred to the effectiveness of certain deicing fluids over time and the increased use of Type II fluid. This mixture includes polymerising agents, which make the deicing effect last longer.

Another cause of the crash of Flight 1363 was delays in changes to deicing procedures put forth in the Canadian Aviation Safety Board's (CASB) majority report on the 1985 crash of Arrow Air Flight 1285R, which may have also involved accumulation of ice on the wings, but the controversy surrounding a separate minority report – with its conclusions later repeated in testimony to a US Congressional committee – which stated that a thin layer of ice could not possibly have brought down that flight, preferring a discounted theory of an explosive material being the cause. Both crashes undermined confidence in the CASB's investigations and led to the Canadian government shutting down the CASB one year after the Flight 1363 accident. The CASB was replaced by the Transportation Safety Board of Canada (TSB), a more independent and multimodal investigative agency.

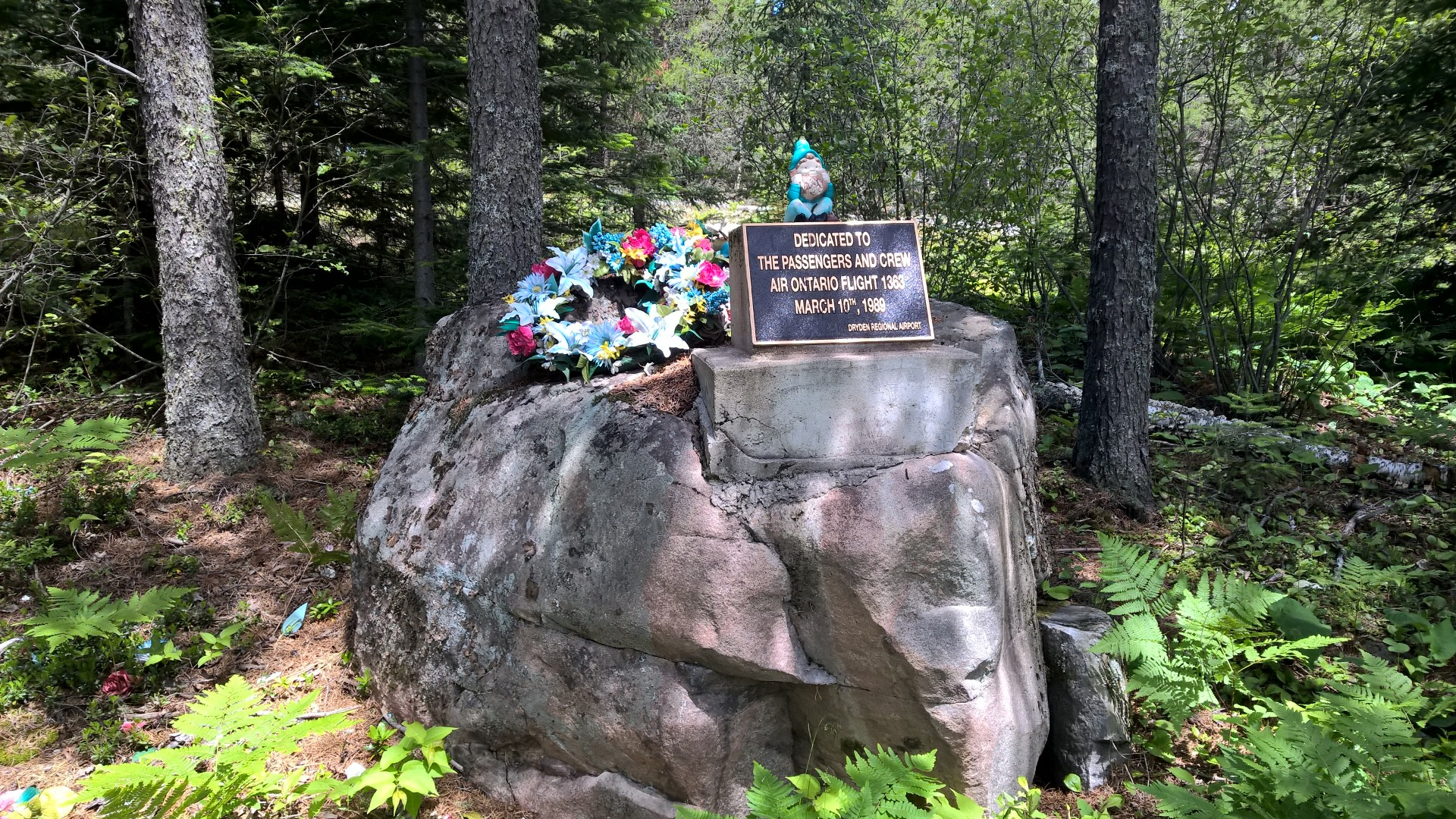
Air Ontario 1363 Memorial Site

== Memorial ==
A memorial is located on McArthur Road near Dryden, just west of the airport.

== In popular culture ==
The Discovery Channel Canada / National Geographic TV series Mayday featured the incident in a season-9 episode titled "Cold Case". TLC also aired a segment on the crash in the 1990s special called Terror in the Sky. It featured interviews with passengers and footage from the investigation hearing.

== See also ==
- USAir Flight 405, a 1992 flight, also in an F28, which crashed on takeoff after ice had accumulated on the wings during taxi
- Atmospheric icing
- Ice protection system
