= Stévenin =

Stévenin is a surname. Notable people with the surname include:

- Hervé Stevenin (born 1962), French aquanaut
- Jean-François Stévenin (1944–2021), French actor and filmmaker
- Robinson Stévenin (born 1981), French actor
- Sagamore Stévenin (born 1974), French actor
- Salomé Stévenin (born 1985), French actress
