= École nationale supérieure de mécanique et d'aérotechnique =

French engineering school in Poitiers

Coordinates: 46°39′41″N 0°21′38″E

École Nationale Supérieure de Mécanique et d’Aérotechnique (ISAE-ENSMA)
- Type: Grande Ecole
- Established: 1948
- President: Jean-Pierre Métivier (Airbus France)
- Director: Roland Fortunier
- Location: Chasseneuil-du-Poitou, near Poitiers, Poitou-Charentes, France
- Website: www.isae-ensma.fr

The École Nationale Supérieure de Mécanique et d'Aérotechnique (French pronunciation: [ekɔl nɑsjɔnal sypeʁjœʁ də mekanik e daeʁɔtɛknik]; ISAE-ENSMA) is a grande école founded in 1948 and located near Poitiers, France.

Graduates generally work as R&D engineers for corporations in the aerospace (60%), transportation, capital goods, and energy industry. The school is part of GEA, CESAER, PEGASUS and the ISAE group with the Institut supérieur de l'aéronautique et de l'espace (ISAE-SUPAERO). It is a member of Leonardo da Vinci consolidated University, an association of educational institutions in the former Centre, Poitou-Charentes and Limousin regions.

== History ==
In 1945, the Institut de Mécanique et d’Aérotechnique de Poitiers (IMAP) was founded as a collaboration between the French Air Ministry, the University of Paris and the University of Poitiers. In 1947, the government of France began establishing a new set of national engineering schools. As part of these reforms, the IMAP was turned into the École nationale supérieure de mécanique et d'aérotechnique (ENSMA) on March 27, 1948.

In 1986, the ENSMA was awarded the status of établissement public à caractère administrative (a designation given to various institutions considered to contribute to the public interest), affiliated to the University of Poitiers.

In 1993 ENSMA moved from Poitiers Center to Futuroscope in view of having a larger campus for larger research capacities.

In 2011, the ENSMA co-founded a network of engineering schools called the Groupe ISAE in collaboration with the Institut Supérieur de l'Aéronautique et de l'Espace (ISAE). With the creation of this grouping, the school began using its current acronym, ISAE-ENSMA.

In 2017, it was designated an établissement public à caractère scientifique, culturel et professionnel, a collection of scientific, cultural and professional education institutes with legal, administrative and financial autonomy in the French education system. This established ISAE-ENSMA as a fully autonomous institution.

== Admission ==
For French students, admission to ISAE-ENSMA is decided after a nationwide competitive entrance exam at the end of preparatory classes. Preparatory classes is a two to three-year undergraduate science program with a focus on subjects such as Mathematics, Physics, Chemistry, Engineering Sciences, and Industrial Sciences. It corresponds to freshman and sophomore years at US universities. Once admitted students undergo a three year program. Thus the undergraduate studies plus the ISAE-ENSMA program accounts for more than 300 ECTS credit in the European education system.

In order to enroll in a master's program students must have a Bachelor’s degree preferentially in mechanical, aerospace or mechatronics engineering.

== Academics ==
ISAE-ENSMA offers the following programs:

The ISAE-ENSMA Diplome d'Ingenieur (French engineering qualification equivalent to a MSc in Mechanical Engineering and Aerotechnics)

The Ensma diplome d'ingenieur is a three year program. During the first two years students have a take mandatory classes in science (mathematics, physics); in engineering (continuum mechanics, fluid mechanics, structural mechanics, materials science, thermodynamics, heat transfer, propulsion, signal processing, automation, computer science,...) and in social sciences (management, humanities, foreign languages)

Third year students choose one of the following courses:

- Aerodynamics, Energetics & Thermal Science

- Materials & Structural Engineering

- Computer Science

2 Masters of Science

- MSc in Aeronautical Mechanics & Energetics (AME)

- International MSc in Turbulence (in partnership with Centrale Lille and ENSI Poitiers).

3 Masters with Poitiers University

- Space and Aerospace (Aeronautical and Terrestrial transportation - Aeronautical Mechanics & Energetic - Turbulence)

- High Performance Materials

- Computer Science

Partnerships

ISAE-ENSMA has established several international partnerships (double degrees, exchanges, research collaboration) with universities around the world.

== Research at ISAE-ENSMA ==
Two research labs are attached to the ENSMA / University of Poitiers / ENSIP:

- Institut Pprime for energetics and materials with the French CNRS
- LIAS for electronics, computer science and automatics.

Institut Pprime is the second-largest laboratory from engineering science in France with 572 people working for it in 2014

The laboratory is divided in three departments:

- Physics and Mechanics of Materials
- Fluids, Thermal and Combustion Sciences
- Mechanics, Structures and Complex Systems

The LIAS is composed of three teams:

- data and models engineering
- embedded real-time systems
- automatic control & systems

The leading topics researched at ISAE-ENSMA are the following:

- turbulence, unsteady and compressible aerodynamics, flow control
- turbulent combustion and detonation science
- mechanical behavior and durability of materials and structures
- data engineering and embedded systems
- coupled heat transfer and transfer control

== Notable alumni ==
- Lionel Guérin, founding President of Airlinair.
- Sébastien Guingo, executive officer LLPM Ariane 6 design office
- Hervé Stevenin, European aquanaut leading ESA Neutral Buoyancy Facility Operations
- Jacques Santrot, Mayor and Deputy
