= Xplorair =

Compact VTOL aircraft project

Xplorair PX200 (1/2 scale model) at Paris Air Show 2013.

The Xplorair is a project of compact VTOL aircraft without rotating airfoil from aerospace engineer Michel Aguilar, funded by the French Armed Forces procurement agency DGA and supported by various European aeronautics firms such as Dassault Systèmes, EADS Innovation Works, MBDA, Altran Technologies, Sogeti, Turbomeca, COMAT Aerospace and the Institut Pprime. Announced in 2007, the project aimed to develop a UAV prototype scheduled for flight in 2017, followed by a single-seater personal air vehicle (PAV) whose commercialization could occur the decade after.

The Xplorair is intended to be flown in the future above cities by anyone with a ground vehicle driver's license (thanks to a fully automated, SATS-like flight mode), but it has no wheels and does not function as a roadable aircraft.

== Xplorair PX200 ==
The PX200 (Personal Xplorair 200 km/h) is the single-seater Xplorair model currently in development. A 1/2 scale model of the Xplorair PX200 was exhibited at Paris Air Show 2013. A radio-controlled flying full-scale model, including a seat but still unmanned, was scheduled for take-off at Paris Air Show 2017. The first manned prototype should be ready before 2020, then certified and brought to market before 2030 at a public price between $60,000 and $120,000. Two-seater and four-seater models are also planned.

Main characteristics of the Xplorair PX200:

- Dimensions: 3.7 m × 2.7 m × 1.3 m (145 in × 106 in × 51 in)
- Dry weight: 300 kg (660 lb)
- Cruise speed: 200 km/h (125 mph)
- Maximum speed: 640 km/h (400 mph)
- Cruise altitude: 9,000 ft (2,700 m)
- Range: 480 km (300 mi)
- Fuel economy: 15 L/100 km (16 mpg_{‑US})
- Use of biofuel from algaculture. Other fuels could be used, like kerosene, methane, hydrogen.
- Use of eco-friendly materials, in particular natural fiber (bamboo, linen...)

== Early developments ==
In 2002, French aerospace engineer Michel Aguilar, then 52 years old, retired from DGA to work as a full-time independent contractor on his Xplorair project, a VTOL aircraft where the common rotating airfoils (like propellers, rotors or ducted fans) are replaced by a new type of small jet engine directly fitted within wing's body, the thermoreactor. The aircraft would rely a lot on the Coandă effect for vertical take-off, increased lift and reduced drag.

A four-seater scale model was presented at Paris Air Show 2007. The year after, Aguilar founded the nonprofit organization Xplorair in order to gain expertise from specialized engineering consulting firms.

== Thermoreactor jet engine ==
In 2011, Michel Aguilar's thermoreactor project received $2 million over three years in a subsidy from the Government of France through the Defense procurement agency DGA and the DGCIS of the Ministry of the Industry, under their RAPID award scheme supporting innovative technological projects of small and medium enterprises.

A consortium gathering Turbomeca, COMAT Aerospace and the Institut Pprime has been formed to evaluate the thermoreactor jet engine and develop the technology.

The thermoreactor is a small jet engine, ramjet-pulsejet hybrid. It uses a combustion at constant volume (isochoric) under the Humphrey cycle, whose thermal efficiency is greater (about 20%) than combustion at constant pressure (isobaric) of the Brayton cycle classically used in turbomachinery.

The combustion chamber is fed through a control valve and an inlet pipe by compressed air from a rotary vane pump aside in the fuselage, which extracts ambient air and moderately compresses it into a storage tank.

The thermoreactor has a square cross section and very compact dimensions (25 cm × 10 cm × 10 cm [10 in × 4 in × 4 in]). Thermoreactors are small enough to be fitted within wing's body as an array next to each other. Each thermoreactor develops a thrust of 170 newtons. The Xplorair PX200 includes 20 thermoreactors: 7 in each front wing, and 6 in aircraft tail. During take-off and landing, the 20 thermoreactors work together, providing 3,400 newtons of thrust. The cruise altitude of 9,000 ft (2,700 m) is reached in 4 minutes for 15 kg (33 lb) of fuel burnt. Only one thermoreactor at each front wing's tip would then be needed to maintain a cruise speed of 200 km/h (125 mph). The simultaneous activation of all thermoreactors during flight is still possible and would bring the speed to 640 km/h (400 mph), at the cost of a poorer fuel efficiency.

== Coandă effect and further developments ==
In 2008 the project is first supported by Dassault Systèmes with the Passion for Innovation Program, EADS Innovation Works (the R&D department of Airbus) and MBDA. The project evolves in a single-seater aircraft with inverted V-tail nicknamed the Colibri because it would perform a vertical angled take-off like a hummingbird.

The exhaust gas temperature (EGT) of the thermoreactor using the Humphrey cycle being lower than in the conventional Brayton cycle by hundreds of degrees, the exhaust airflow out of the propelling nozzles at the trailing edge of the front wings can be directed onto the upper surface of the rear wings. The speedier airflow and the resulting Coandă effect around the curvature allow a higher lift coefficient and a smaller wingspan. This technique is quite similar to the blown wing used notably on the Breguet 941, Boeing YC-14 and Antonov An-72.

Xplorair is also supported since 2013 by Altran Technologies and Sogeti who develop the aerostructure and the avionics of the aircraft, now called the Xplorair PX200 (Personal Xplorair 200 km/h). Since the previous studies, aerodynamics evolved again with an upward V-tail and the use of the Coandă effect onto the upper surface of rear biplane tiltwings. During take-off or landing, these rear tiltwings rotate 90° and the leading edge of the lower rear wing connects to the trailing edge of the front wing, directly onto jet nozzles. The exhaust gas follows the curved surface due to the Coandă effect, and the slipstream is diverted downcast, providing powered lift for VTOL operation.

To avoid noise pollution, Sogeti also develops acoustic reflection techniques by shear rate modulation on jet. Reduction of about 15 dB, i.e. 30 times less sound power, is expected.

The Coandă effect is also used on the Xplorair to reduce form drag. While cruising, compressed air is injected as a radial jet at nose and leading edges, orthogonally to the ambient airflow, then covers the whole wetted area. This reduces the form drag, and could even make it negative with enough jet speed. This technique has been tested for the first time in 1918 by French physicist Constantin Chilowsky on shells, then various authors took over the idea to improve projectiles, including Henri Coandă for his own research on aerodynamics. This is why Aguilar refers to the "Chilowsky effect" rather than "Coandă effect" for this drag reduction scheme. This technique applied in air is similar to the submarine supercavitation technique used in some torpedoes like the VA-111 Shkval.

The PX200 aerostructure also allows for wing-in-ground-effect (WIG). The Xplorair could cruise at low altitude above seawater or special highways that would be built for such personal air vehicles, in order to reduce the lift-induced drag and thus improve the fuel efficiency.

In June 2014, Aguilar founds the private limited liability corporate entity ACG Aviation to develop the concept further.

== Patents ==
As of 2014, Michel Aguilar filed 10 patents on the Xplorair and the thermoreactor:

- FR application 2906222, Aguilar, Michel, "Vehicle e.g. helicopter, for transporting passengers, has turbine generating air stream on front wing upper surface, and rear wing with upper surface on which flue gas stream is applied to produce air lift force to allow takeoff and landing", published 2008-03-28, assigned to Aguilar, Michel
- FR application 2910056, Aguilar, Michel, "Rotary wing-less vertical take-off and landing vehicle for transporting passengers by air, has rear wing whose variable incidence is set to generate lift force in take-off mode, and added to forces developed on front wings in cruise mode", published 2008-06-20, assigned to Aguilar, Michel
- EP patent 2066564, Aguilar, Michel, "Vertical take-off and landing vehicle which does not have a rotary wing", issued 2010-09-15, assigned to Aguilar, Michel
- FR application 2941496, Aguilar, Michel, "Turbomachine i.e. thermoreactor, has air-fuel injector for injecting pressurized air-fuel mixture into combustion chamber, where injected air-fuel mixture realizes constant volume combustion and combustion gas release", published 2010-07-30, assigned to Aguilar, Michel
- WO application 2012113523, Aguilar, Michel, "Jet engine, in particular a jet engine for an aircraft", published 2012-08-30, assigned to Aguilar, Michel
- FR application 2960259, Aguilar, Michel, "Turbocharger for use in e.g. turbojet engine of aircraft, has combustion chamber supplied with compressed air by opening that allows introduction of air in chamber, and compressor whose air outlets are opened in inner volume of reservoir", published 2011-11-25, assigned to EADS EUROP AERONAUTIC DEFENCE
- FR application 2983906, Aguilar, Michel, "Method for thermal ignition of a pulsed combustion engine, and thermoreactor with thermal ignition", published 2013-06-14, assigned to Aguilar, Michel
- WO application 2012113523, Aguilar, Michel, "Jet engine, in particular for an aircraft", published 2012-08-30, assigned to Aguilar, Michel
- FR application 2971553, Aguilar, Michel, "Method for reducing noise of propulsion jet reactor of aircraft, involves ejecting shear flows at trailing edge of nacelles of reactor with ejection velocity in range between velocities of flows at inner and outer sides of nacelles", published 2012-08-17, assigned to EADS EUROP AERONAUTIC DEFENCE
- FR application 2991721, Aguilar, Michel, "Method and thermal reactor for single-valve propulsion with multiple injections and combustions per rotation cycle", published 2013-12-13, assigned to Aguilar, Michel

== See also ==
- Vertical take-off and landing (VTOL)
- Flying car (disambiguation)
- Personal air vehicle

=== External links ===
- Xplorair website
- ACG Aviation website
- Xplorair PX200 flying car (vertical take-off) on YouTube
- Xplorair: an Altran Project on YouTube (French), Altran, 19 June 2013
