= Jie =

Jie or JIE may refer to:

- Jie of Xia, last ruler of the Xia dynasty of China
- Jie Zhitui or Zitui (7th century BC), a famed minister of Zhou dynasty
- Jie people, tribe in the Xiongnu Confederation in the 4th and 5th centuries
- Jie (Uganda), an ethnic group of Ugandan pastoralists
- Jiye/Jie, an ethnic group in Eastern Equatoria state, South Sudan
- Jiedao, subdistrict, an administrative division in China
- Yu Jie, Chinese author
- Journal of Interdisciplinary Economics (JIE)
- Journées Information Eaux (JIE), a French congress about water
- Mispronunciation of Xie (surname 解)
