= Air Liberté =

Airline of France (1987–2003)

Air Liberté S.A. Air Lib S.A.

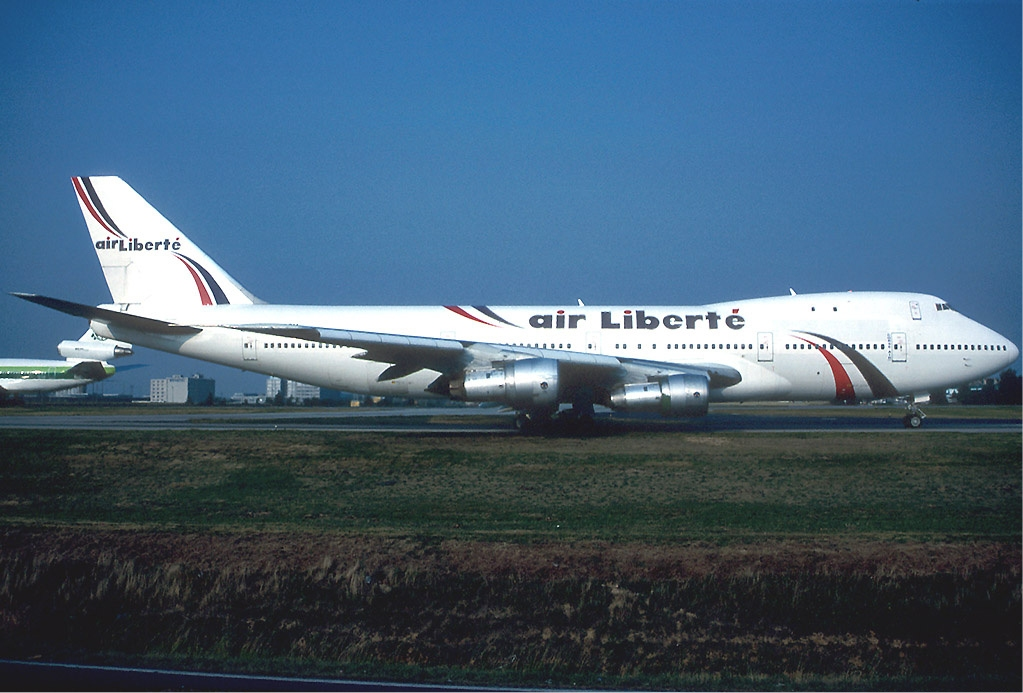
- Boeing 747-100 in its first livery.
IATA	ICAO	Call sign
IJ (1987–2001); IW (2001–2003)	LIB (1987–2003)	LIBERTE (1987–2001); AIR LIB (2001–2003)
- Founded: July 1987 (as Air Liberté)
- Commenced operations: 22 September 2001 (as Air Lib)
- Ceased operations: 22 September 2001 (as Air Liberté); 6 February 2003 (as Air Lib)
- Hubs: Orly Airport
- Frequent-flyer program: Executive Club (1997–2000); Qualiflyer (2000–2001)
- Alliance: Oneworld (affiliate; 1999–2000)
- Subsidiaries: Air Liberté Tunisie (1989–1996)
- Parent company: British Airways (1997–2000)
- Headquarters: Air Liberté: Rungis, France; Air Lib: Building 363, Orly Airport, Paray-Vieille-Poste
- Key people: Eric Schulz (CEO); Jean-Charles Corbet (former CEO of Air Lib)

Air Liberté, later renamed Air Lib, was a French airline founded in July 1987. It was headquartered in Rungis. Air Lib was headquartered in Orly Airport Building 363 in Paray-Vieille-Poste.

== History ==
Air Liberté began charter operations in April 1988 with a leased McDonnell Douglas MD-80. It mainly operated to holiday destinations in Europe and Mediterranean basins, but it had also some intercontinental routes. In 1991, Air Liberté published a joint timetable with French air carrier Minerve which was operating flights to San Francisco and Papeete, Tahiti as well as to Pointe-à-Pitre and Fort-de-France in the Caribbeans. A route to Montreal was inaugurated in 1992, and to Réunion and the Caribbeans later on. Unsuccessful routes included one from Toulouse to Dakar and London, which were scrapped in a conflict over slot allocations at Orly Airport. 1996 saw the inauguration of a route to Nice, and in May the Euralair network was taken on. In mid-1990s, the airline had a fleet of five Boeing 737-200s, eight McDonnell Douglas MD-83s and five McDonnell Douglas DC-10s.

1996 also brought financial distress. The airline lost 1 billion francs that year, and in early 1997 British Airways acquired a 67% shareholding. British Airways unified Air Liberté together with TAT (a subsidiary from August 1996) under one management between the end of 1997 and the first months of the following year. On 5 May 2000, the British airline sold Air Liberté to a partnership between Taitbout Antibes and Swiss flag carrier Swissair.

On 25 March 2001 AOM French Airlines merged with Air Liberté, and this name was kept until 22 September, when the airline was renamed Air Lib. In October, Swissair went bankrupt, unable to make all scheduled payments. The French Government then granted a loan of €30.5 million to the battered company.

Despite government aid, the airline accumulated debts of €120 million and was forced to declare bankruptcy in August 2002. The government then ordered the implementation of a new restructuring plan before the end of the year. Several projects were considered but all without result. The air carrier halted all operations on 6 February 2003 was liquidated on 17 February.

== Destinations ==
=== France ===
- Agen – Agen La Garenne Airport
- Annecy – Annecy – Haute-Savoie – Mont Blanc Airport
- Aurillac – Aurillac – Tronquières Airport
- Bergerac – Bergerac Dordogne Périgord Airport
- Bordeaux – Bordeaux–Mérignac Airport
- Brive-la-Gaillarde – Brive–La Roche Airport
- Carcassonne – Carcassonne Airport
- Cherbourg-Octeville – Cherbourg – Maupertus Airport
- Épinal – Épinal – Mirecourt Airport
- Figari – Figari–Sud Corse Airport
- Lannion – Lannion – Côte de Granit Airport
- La Rochelle – La Rochelle – Île de Ré Airport
- Metz/Nancy – Metz–Nancy–Lorraine Airport
- Montpellier – Montpellier–Méditerranée Airport
- Nice – Nice Côte d'Azur Airport
- Paris – Orly Airport (hub)
- Perpignan – Perpignan–Rivesaltes Airport
- Roanne – Roanne-Renaison Airport
- Rodez – Rodez–Aveyron Airport
- Strasbourg – Strasbourg Airport
- Toulon – Toulon–Hyères Airport
- Toulouse – Toulouse–Blagnac Airport

=== French overseas departments and territories ===
- Guadeloupe
  - Pointe-à-Pitre – Pointe-à-Pitre International Airport
- Martinique
  - Fort-de-France – Martinique Aimé Césaire International Airport
- Réunion
  - Saint-Denis – Roland Garros Airport

=== International routes ===
- Canada
  - Montreal
    - Montréal–Dorval International Airport
    - Montréal–Mirabel International Airport
  - Toronto – Toronto Pearson International Airport
- Italy
  - Rome – Leonardo da Vinci–Fiumicino Airport
- Malta
  - Valletta – Malta International Airport
- Morocco
  - Casablanca – Mohammed V International Airport
- Pakistan
  - Karachi – Jinnah International Airport
- Portugal
  - Faro – Faro Airport
  - Lisbon – Humberto Delgado Airport
  - Porto – Francisco Sá Carneiro Airport
- Saint Lucia
  - Castries – Hewanorra International Airport
- Sint Maarten
  - Princess Juliana International Airport
- Spain
  - Alicante – Alicante–Elche Miguel Hernández Airport
  - Málaga – Málaga Airport
- Sri Lanka
  - Colombo – Bandaranaike International Airport
- Thailand
  - Bangkok – Don Mueang International Airport
- Tunisia
  - Djerba – Djerba–Zarzis International Airport
  - Tunis – Tunis–Carthage International Airport
- United Kingdom
  - London – Heathrow Airport

== Fleet ==
Air Liberté operated the following aircraft types:

Image	Aircraft	Total	Notes
	Airbus A300-600R	2	
	Airbus A310-200	2	
	Airbus A310-300	1	Owned by ILFC; later crashed operating Yemenia Flight 626
	ATR 42-300	7	
	ATR 72-202	3	
	Boeing 737-200	3	
	Boeing 747-100	1	
	Embraer EMB-120	5	
	Fokker 100	12	
	McDonnell Douglas DC-10-30	5	
	McDonnell Douglas MD-82	5	
	McDonnell Douglas MD-83	13	
Total		53	

=== Aircraft in Air Lib colours ===
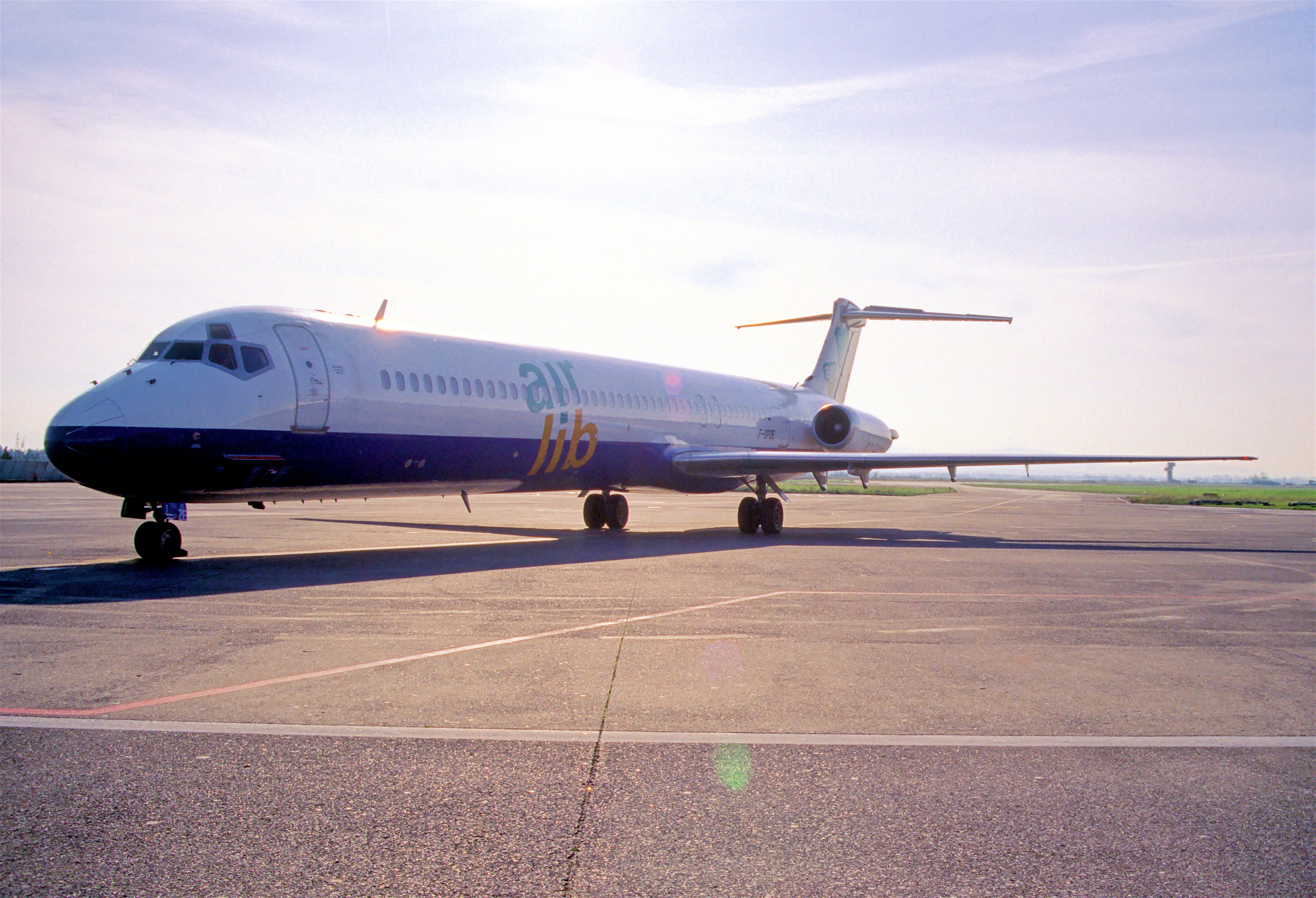
McDonnell Douglas MD-82

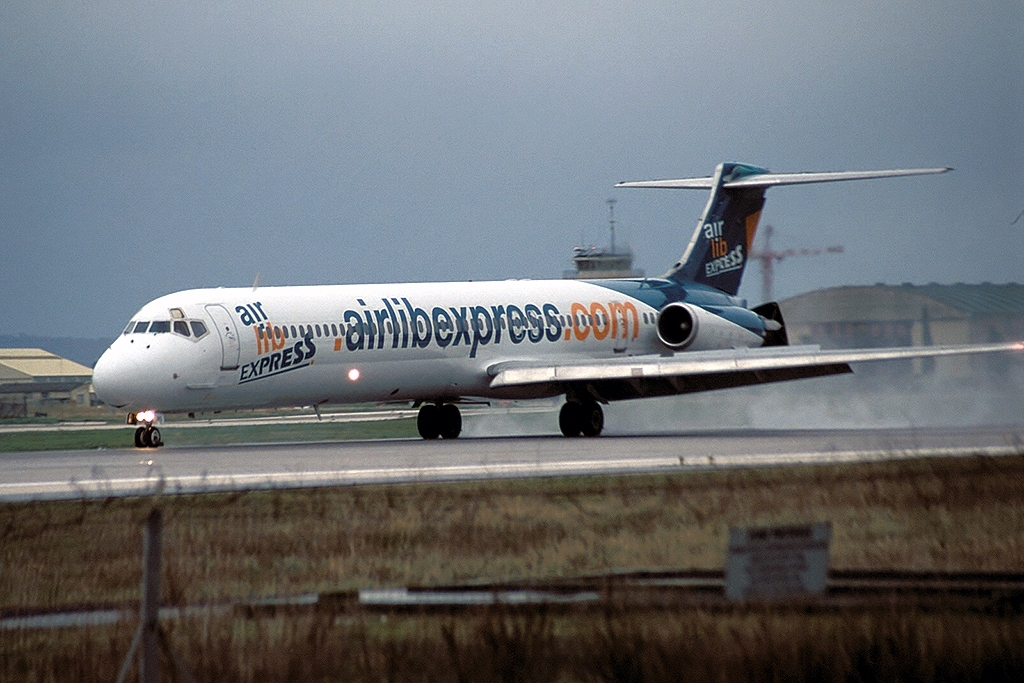
McDonnell Douglas MD-83

== Accidents & Incidents ==
- 25 May 2000: Air Liberté Flight 8807, a McDonnell Douglas MD-83 (F-GHED) collided on the runway with a Short 330 freighter aircraft operated by Streamline Aviation. The Short had been cleared to line up at an intermediate taxiway on the runway that the MD-83 was departing from. The wing of the MD-83 struck the cockpit of the Short, killing its first officer and injuring the captain. The MD-83 aborted takeoff with no casualties on board, and was repaired and returned to service.
