= Jean-Charles Corbet =

French chief executive officer and aviator

- Born: Corbet
- Education: Airline Transport Pilot Licence
- Alma mater: École nationale de l'aviation civile
- Occupation: Former head of Air Lib
- Children: 3

Jean-Charles Corbet is a French chief executive officer and aviator.

== Background ==
Corbet graduated from École nationale de l'aviation civile (ÉNAC) of Toulouse, was promoted airline pilot in 1974), and began his career as an air transport pilot in Gabon, while waiting to be hired by Air France.

After being hired by Air France, he was first officer on a Boeing 737 and 747, and then captain of an Airbus A320 before being qualified for the Airbus A340.

== Head of French pilots' union ==
As head of the Air France section of the Syndicat National des Pilotes de Ligne, he organized a ten-day strike at Air France, just before the 1998 FIFA World Cup. In 2001, he became president of Air Lib, airline created with the merger of AOM French Airlines and Air Liberté.

== Recovery of AOM ==
In July 2001, Jean-Charles Corbet, through Holdco society, proposed to resume the group's assets AOM / Air Liberté, while on probation for one euro. Although not having any credit standing or experience as a business leader, his offer (which was considered the best of the seventeen competing takeover bids) was accepted by the court of Creteil.

The recovery plan was complemented by a commitment of Swissair, a previous AOM shareholder, to pay US$1.250 billion to Holdco, only some of which will be paid (about $1 billion).

The change of government in 2002, and the appointment of Dominique Bussereau as Secretary of State for Transport, lead to the non-renewal of a loan granted status in December 2001, to Air Lib, by former Communist minister of transports (Jean-Claude Gayssot) and, on the advice of the new transport minister, the non-renewal of the operating license of the airline. The bankruptcy of Air Lib in 2003, resulted in the layoff of 3,200 employees of the company.

Following the layoff, a parliamentary committee interviewed Corbet on the use of money paid by Swissair and the heritage of the company (particularly its aircraft). The chairman of the parliamentary commission accused the then-leader of Air Lib to have misappropriated funds and transmitted its report to Justice.

During the trial that followed, the prosecutor qualify the management company as an "methodically organized looting". On Tuesday, September 25, 2007, the Paris court sentenced him to eighteen months in prison and 3 million in damages. He was convicted for not having devoted to Air Lib, all 150 million paid by Swissair while other transfers were made to other group companies, Holdco. On February 27, 2009, the Paris Court of Appeals upheld the conviction. Corbet expressed through his lawyers, his intention to appeal.

June 30, 2010, the Court of Cassation dismissed his appeal, arguing that it was not for him to challenge the decisions of lower courts and thus rendered final his sentence to 18 months in prison for not allocated funds that had contractually and permanently been given to Swissair, according to the protocol signed between the Swiss company and him on 31 July and 1 August 2001.
