= Airlinair =

Regional airline of France (1998–2013)

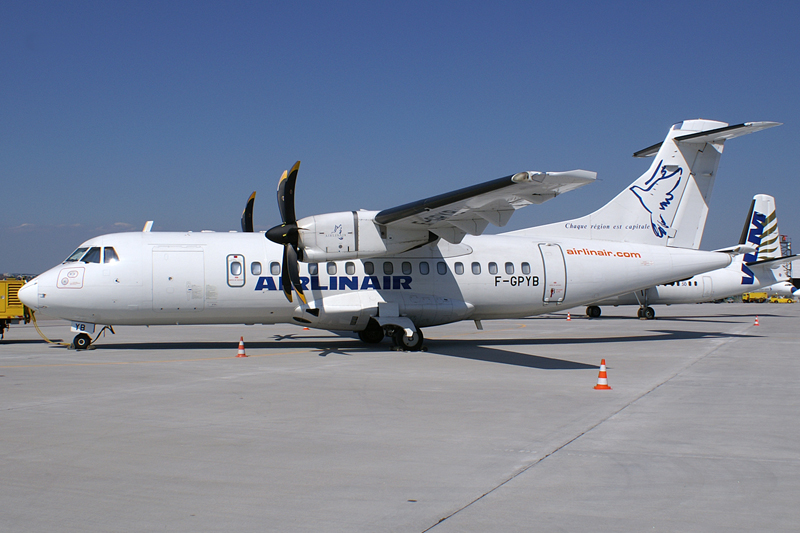
- ATR 42-500
IATA	ICAO	Call sign
AN	RLA	AIRLINAIR
- Founded: December 1998
- Commenced operations: 30 April 1999
- Ceased operations: 31 March 2013 (merged with Brit Air and Régional into Air France Hop)
- Operating bases: Lyon; Paris–Charles de Gaulle; Paris–Orly
- Frequent-flyer program: Flying Blue
- Headquarters: Rungis, France
- Key people: Lionel Guérin (CEO)
- Website: www.hop.com

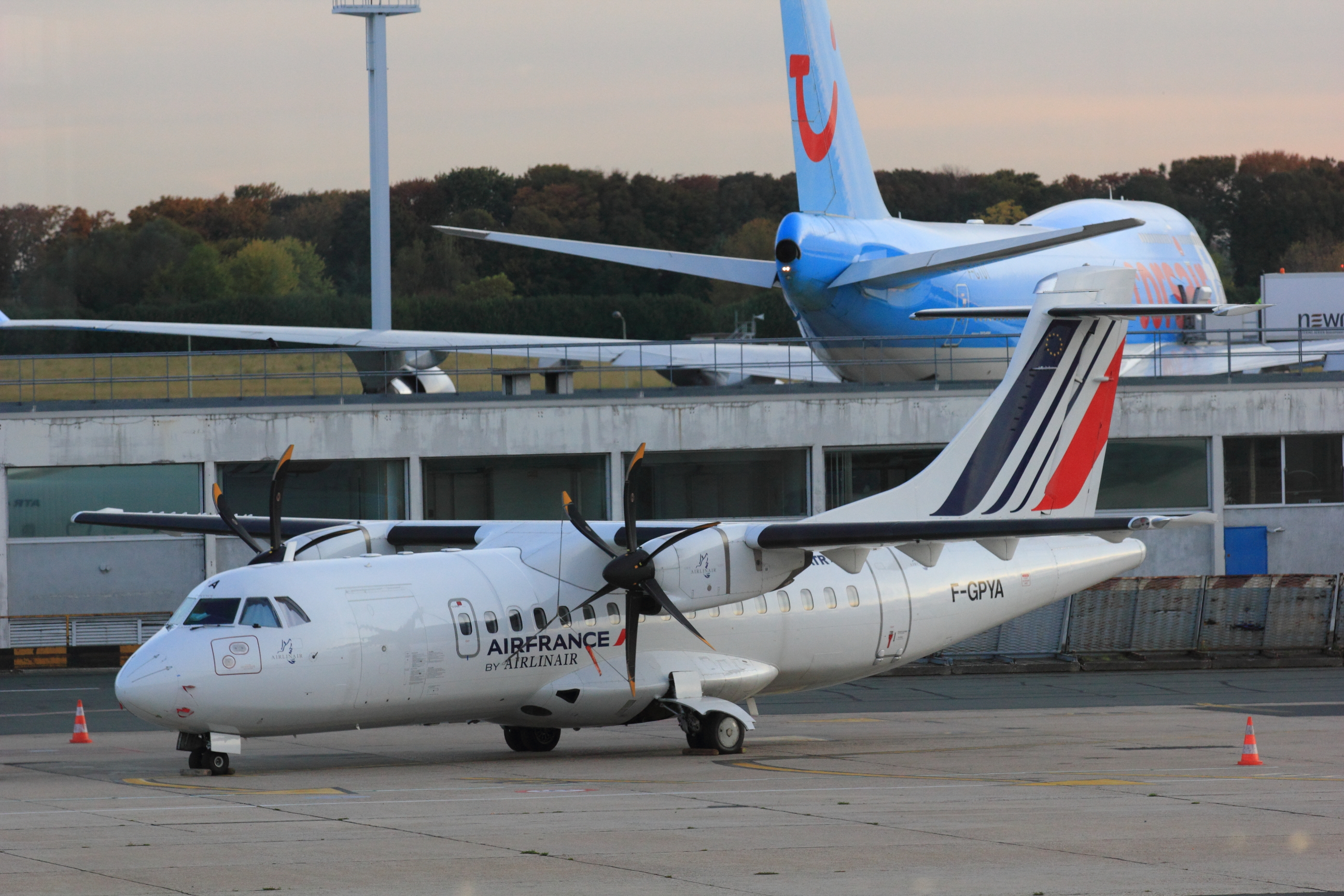
ATR 42-500 in Air France livery at Paris Orly (2011).

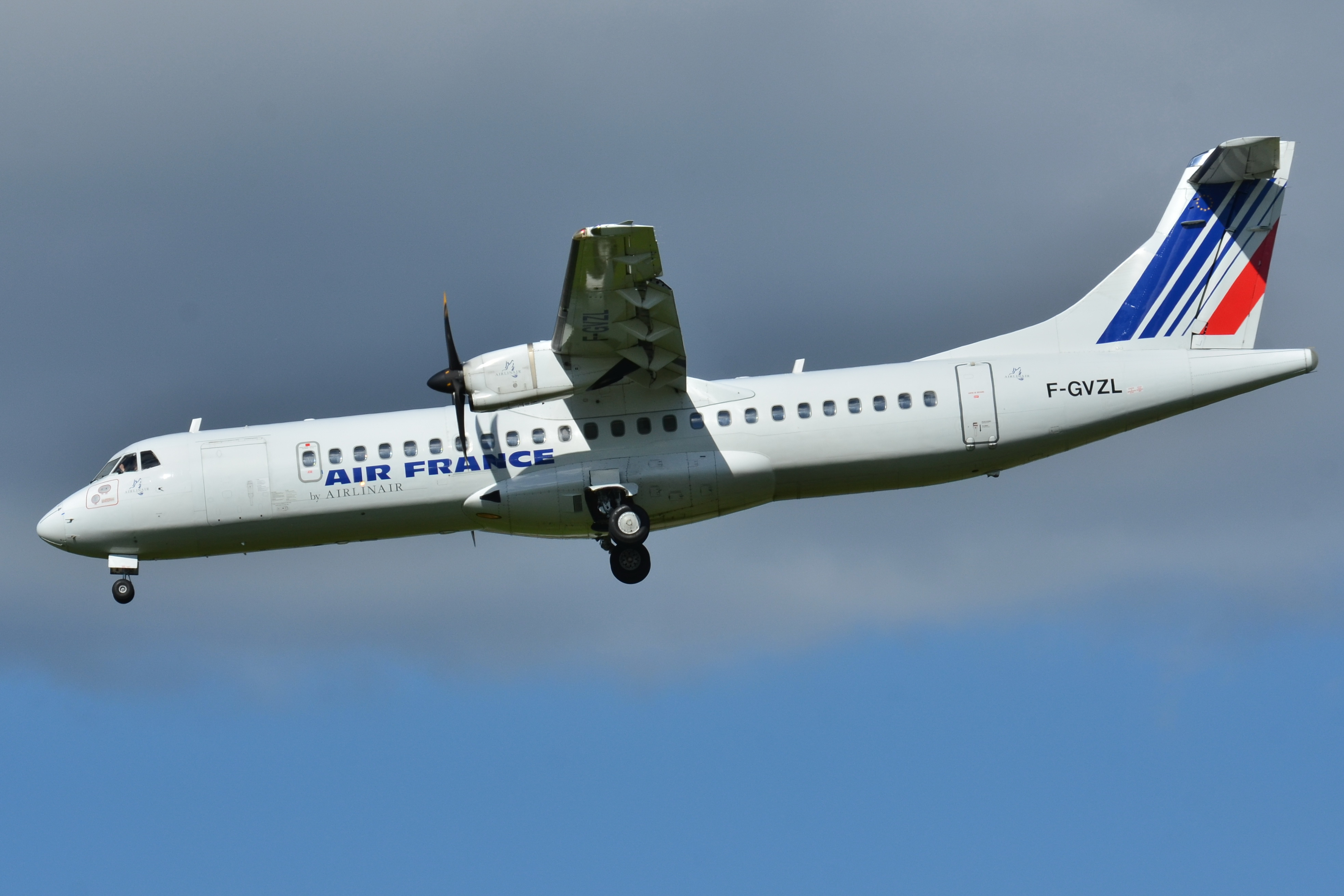
ATR 72-500 in Air France livery

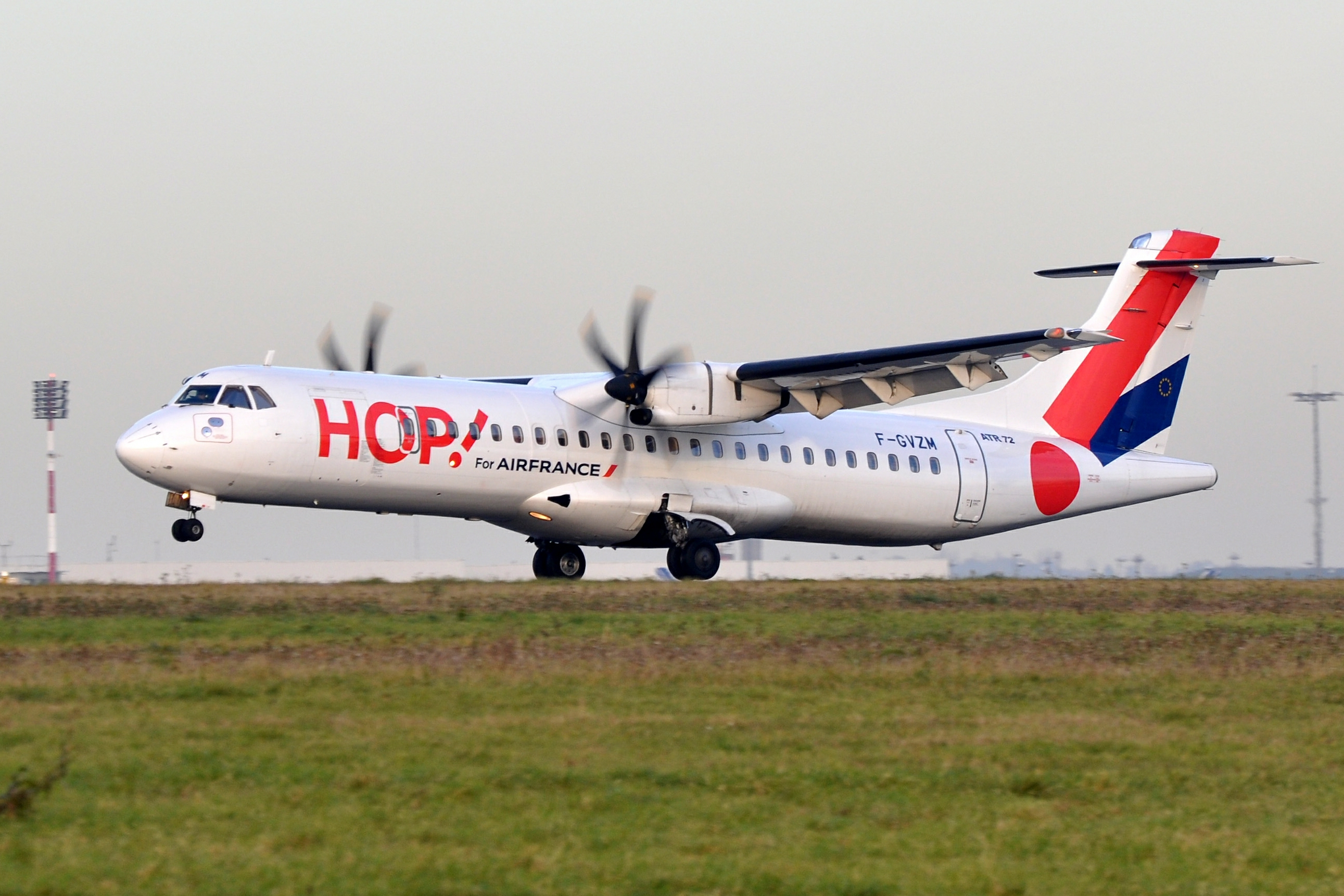
ATR 72-500 in full HOP! colours

Airlinair was a French regional airline based in Rungis, France, operating scheduled flights (some of them on behalf of Air France), and aircraft lease services. The airline had bases at Paris-Orly Airport and Lyon-Saint Exupéry Airport.

== History ==
The airline was established in December 1998. It was founded by four principal shareholders including Lionel Guérin and was owned by private investors (80.5%). It started operations from paris Charles de Gaulle Airport on behalf of Air Lib on 30 April of the following year. In 2002 own operations were launched with routes out of Paris towards Brive, Epinal, Périgueux, Aurillac, Bergerac, Béziers et Castres, and from Lyon-Saint Exupéry Airport to Tours. In that same year it started flying on Air France behalf from Nice to Saint Tropez, very trendy location for VIPs. More flight were performed on Air France behalf from Paris-Charles de Gaulle Airport after the collapse of Air Lib and Air Littoral. In parallel, some ATR freighters flew on behalf of Europe Airpost.

In 2005, Brit Air became a 20% shareholder and its stake rose to 39.85% four years later. In these years, charter activity also grew with flights to many locations in France and the Mediterranean basin. In 2008, 13 ATRs were operated on behalf of Air France. With these premises, at the end of 2012 Air France acquired 60.14% of the ownership. It was only the first step towards closer integration. On 31 March 2013, along with Régional and Brit Air and after a year of negotiations, Airlinair merged operations into HOP!, Air France's regional brand. Airlinair ceased all flight operations in March 2017 after the completion of its merger with HOP!.

== Destinations ==
As of 30 March 2013, Airlinair operates scheduled flights to the following domestic destinations:

City	Airport	Notes
Agen	Agen La Garenne Airport	
Ajaccio	Ajaccio Napoleon Bonaparte Airport	
Aurillac	Aurillac – Tronquières Airport	
Brive-la-Gaillard	Brive–Souillac Airport	
Caen	Caen - Carpiquet Airport	Operated by Chalair
Castres	Castres–Mazamet Airport	
Lannion	Lannion – Côte de Granit Airport	
La Rochelle	La Rochelle – Île de Ré Airport	
Limoges	Limoges – Bellegarde Airport	
Lyon	Lyon–Saint-Exupéry Airport	Base
Paris	Orly Airport	Base
Poitiers	Poitiers–Biard Airport	
Toulouse	Toulouse–Blagnac Airport	

Additionally, the following destinations are served on behalf of Air France:

Country	City	Airport	Notes
France	Clermont-Ferrand	Clermont-Ferrand Auvergne Airport	
France	Limoges	Limoges – Bellegarde Airport	
France	Lyon	Lyon–Saint-Exupéry Airport	Base
France	Marseille	Marseille Provence Airport	
France	Montpellier	Montpellier–Méditerranée Airport	
France	Paris	Orly Airport	
France	Paris	Charles de Gaulle Airport	Base
France	Pau	Pau Pyrénées Airport	
France	Rennes	Rennes–Saint-Jacques Airport	
France	Toulouse	Toulouse–Blagnac Airport	
Germany	Cologne	Cologne Bonn Airport	
Germany	Stuttgart	Stuttgart Airport	
Italy	Florence	Florence Airport	
Italy	Milan	Milan Malpensa Airport	
United Kingdom	Bristol	Bristol Airport	

== Fleet ==
As of March 2017, the Airlinair fleet consists of the following aircraft:

Airlinair fleet
Aircraft	In service	Passengers	Notes
ATR 42-500	11	46	
ATR 72-500	2	70	
ATR 72-600	6	72	
Total	19		

== Subsidiaries ==
Airlinair set up two subsidiary airlines:

- Aérolinair In 2002, ALTIME subsidiary was renamed Aérolinair. The headquarters were moved to Périgueux-Bassilac Airport. Its business activity was also changed to "public or private air transport operations" (ICAO code: ERN and call sign: Faucon Bleu). It was structured to operate Airlinair's Beechcraft 1900D fleet. Using these regional airliners it operated routes from Périgueux to Lyon and to Tours. The company was liquidated in 2015.
- Airlinair Portugal It was established in Portugal in 2008 with the aim of expanding the operations also in Africa. The fleet was made up by a single ATR 42-300, used for mining industries needs, particularly in West Africa. At the end of 2012, the company was acquired by the holding company Adige, owner of the French airline Chalair Aviation. The name was replaced by Lease Fly Aviation Services.
