= AOM French Airlines =

Airline of France (1991–2001)

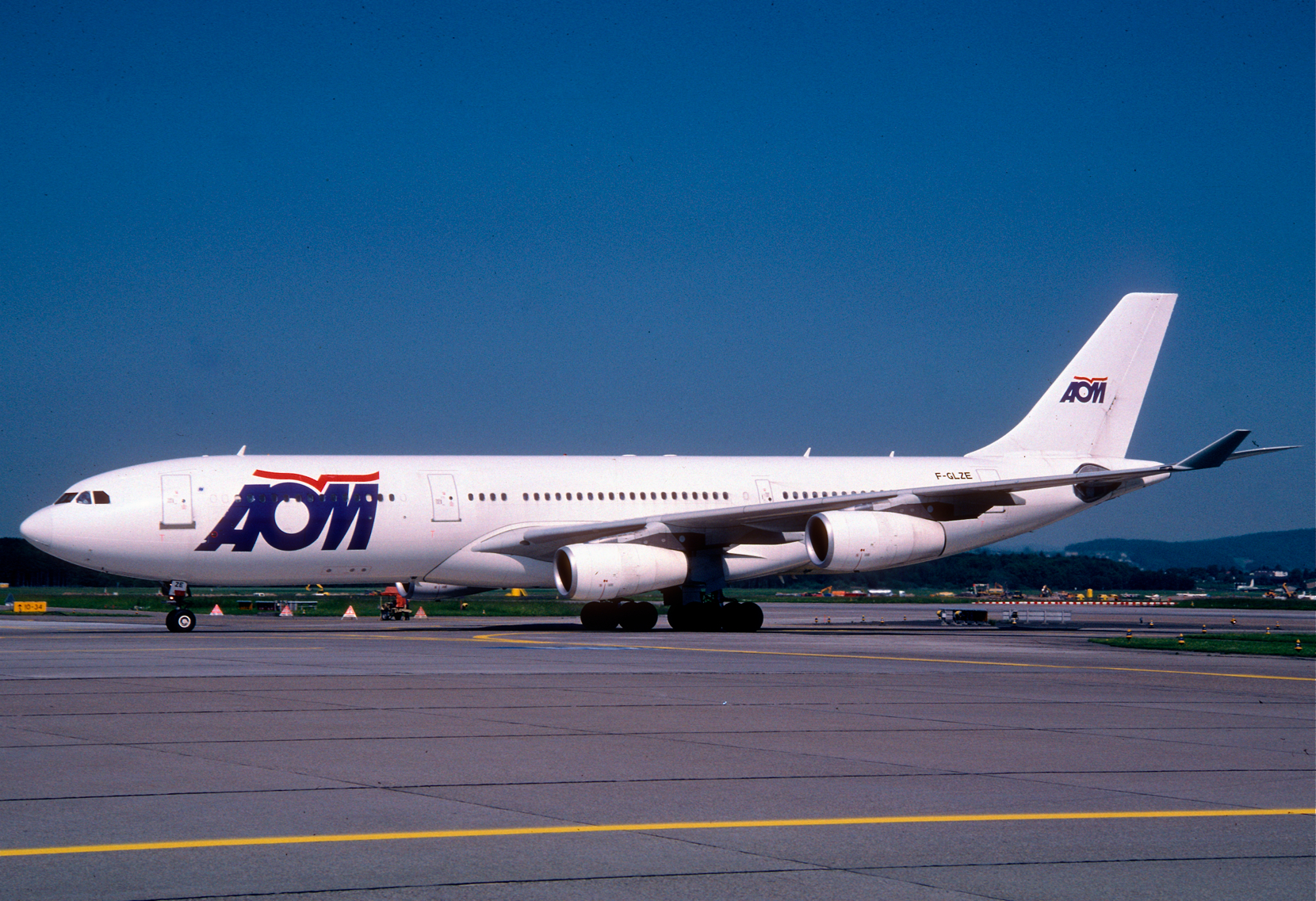
- Airbus A340-200
IATA	ICAO	Call sign
IW	AOM	FRENCH LINES
- Founded: 1 January 1992
- Commenced operations: 1 January 1992
- Ceased operations: 25 March 2001 (merged into Air Liberté)
- Hubs: Orly Airport
- Frequent-flyer program: Qualiflyer
- Headquarters: Paray-Vieille-Poste, France
- Key people: Marc Rochet

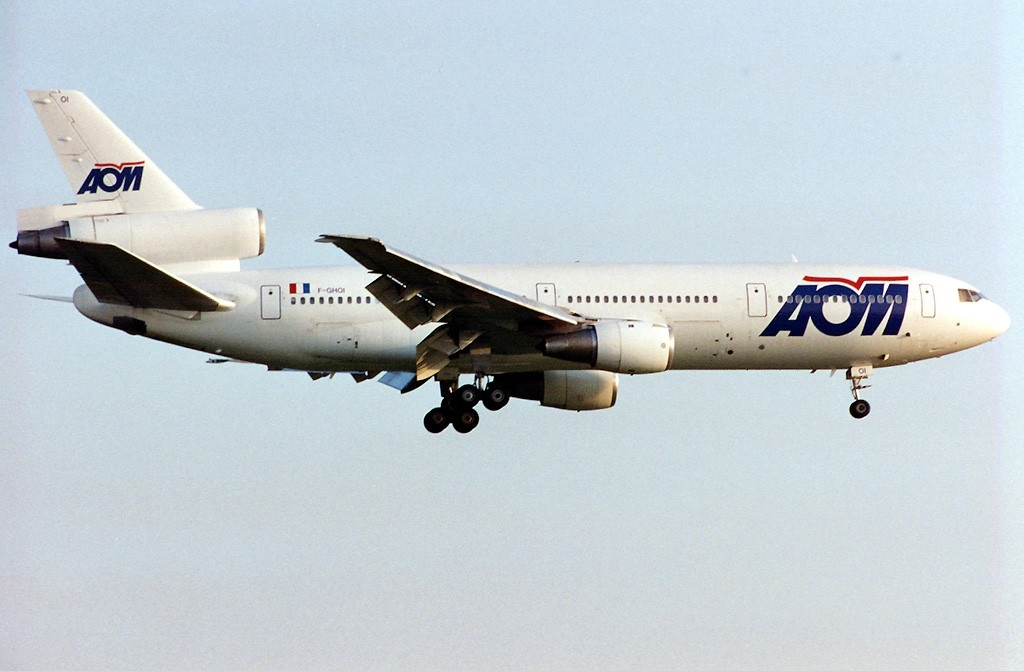
McDonnell Douglas DC-10-30

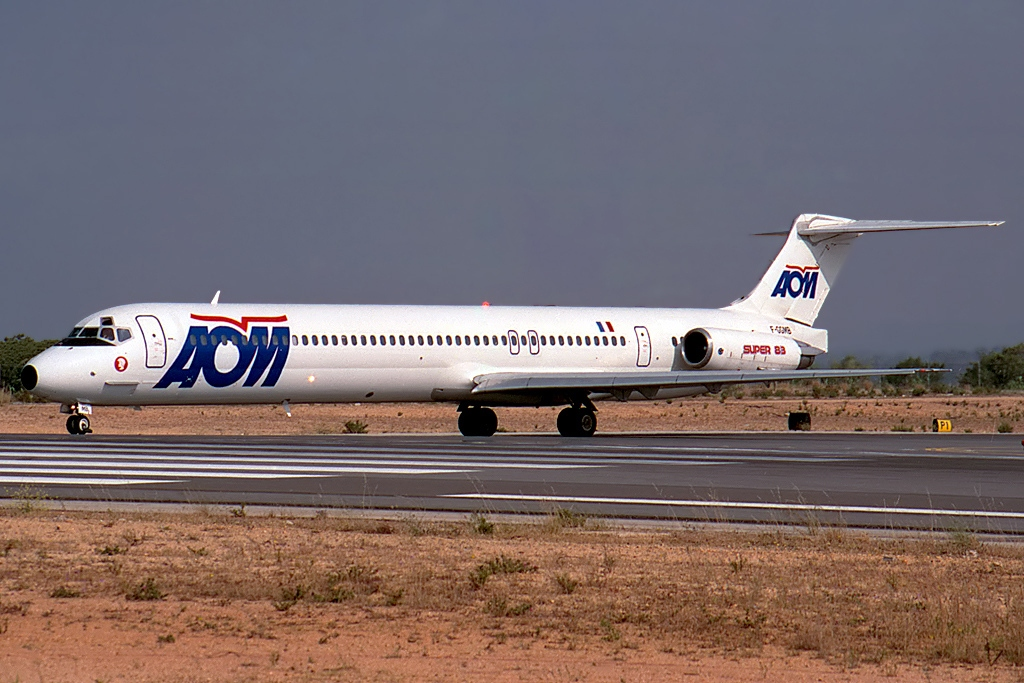
McDonnell Douglas MD-83

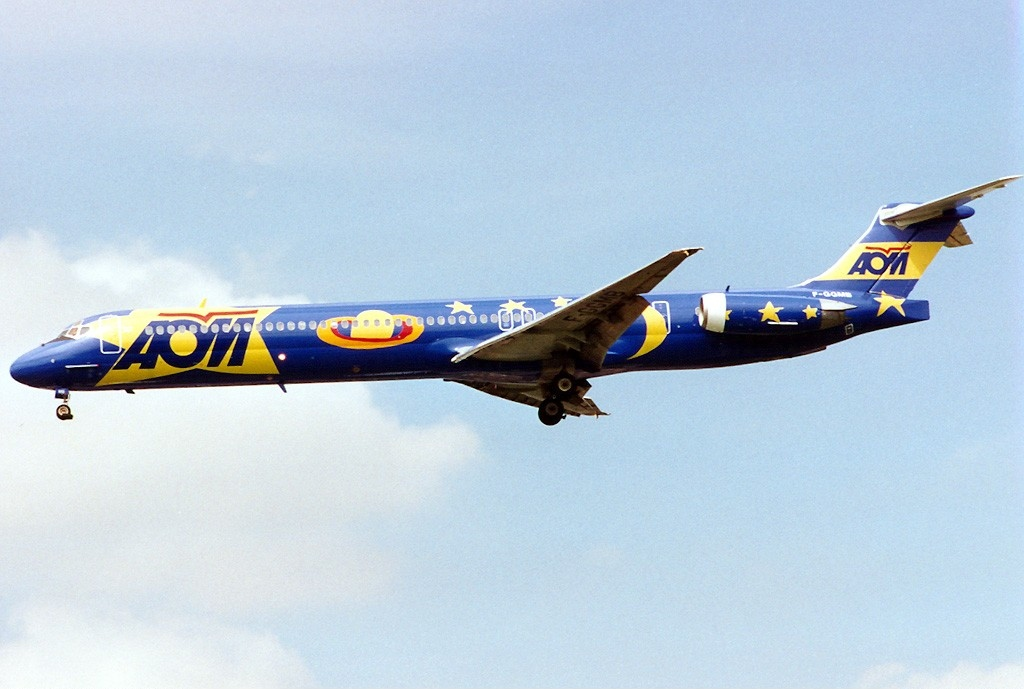
McDonnell Douglas MD-83 in the special colours designed by Alizée singer

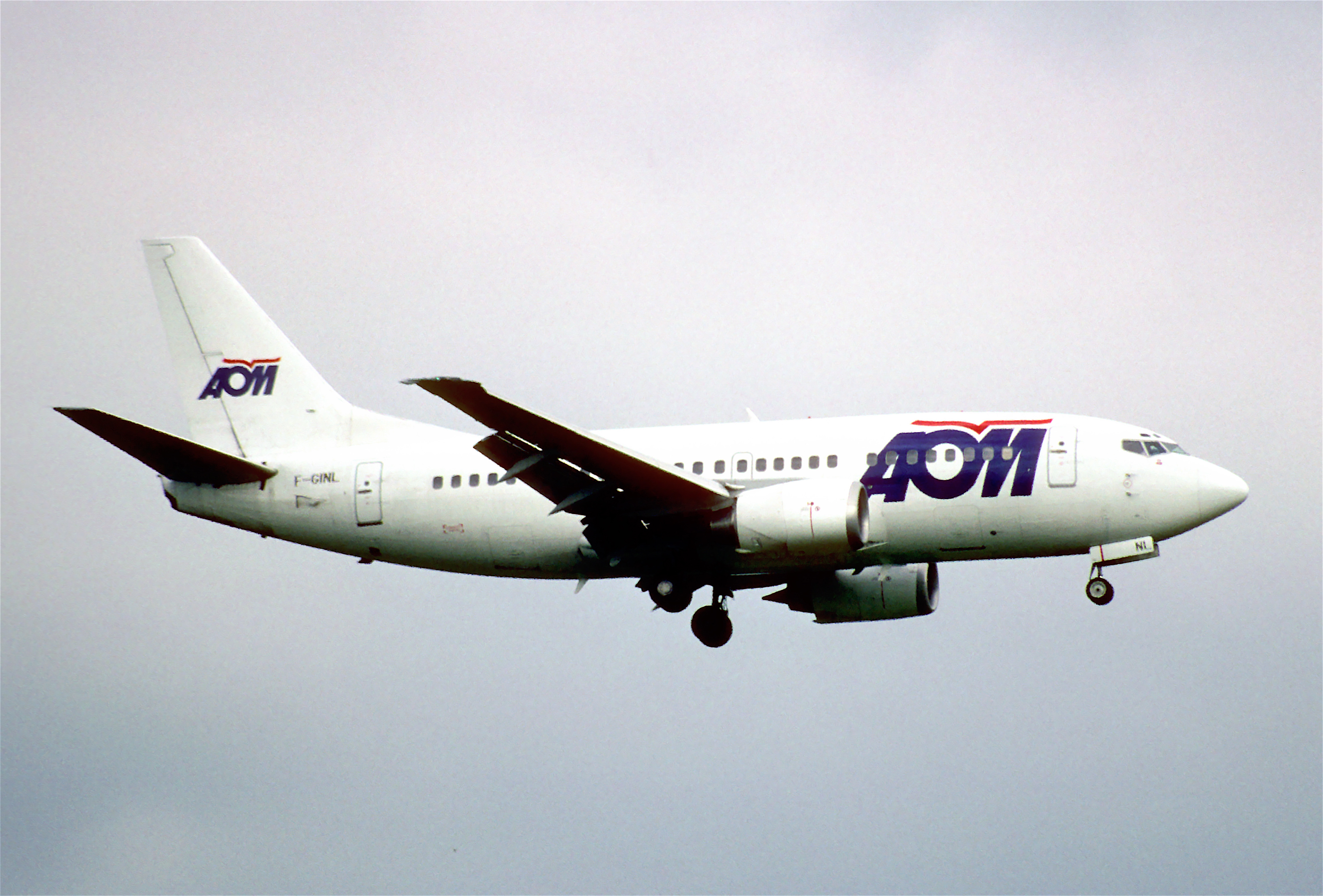
Boeing 737-500

AOM French Airlines was the second-largest airline in France that operated from 1991 until 2001. Its head office was in Building 363 at Orly Airport, Paray-Vieille-Poste.

== History ==
=== Foundation through merger ===
Air Outre Mer S.A., or AOM for short, was founded in July 1987 in the French overseas département of Réunion island and began services on 28 May 1990, locally with a Dornier 228 and a overseas with a McDonnell Douglas DC-10-30. In October 1991, Air Outre Mer agreed to merge with Minerve, a French airline which was based at Orly Airport and had operated since 1975. Minerve had been the first airline to compete directly with Air Inter on the French domestic airline market by opening a Paris (Orly) - Nice route in May 1991. However, Minerve's history had been marked by clashes and restrictions imposed by the State to protect "its company Air France" (refused aircraft changes, refusal to take off in France and therefore obligation to transfer the passengers by train to Brussels, etc.).

The two companies began operating under the name AOM French Airlines, although the administrative name was "AOM-Minerve S.A.", on 1 January 1992. Throughout its existence, AOM suffered from a lack of resources, as it was owned by the CDR-Consortium de Réalisation, a financial entity tasked with selling off the former "rotten" assets of Crédit Lyonnais bank. The CDR, whose sole mission was to sell the company, made no investments in it. AOM thus remained a struggling airline, primarily due to fierce competition. Under pressure from Air France and Aéroports de Paris, it was forced to relocate the flights from Orly-Ouest (a terminal recently renovated for Air France) to the more outdated Orly-Sud terminal. AOM resisted in vain by all means (including painting "I want to stay at Orly West!" on some aircraft) for the simple reason that domestic traffic departed from Orly-Ouest, not Orly-Sud. This would have been tantamount to condemning the airline. For most of the decade, the airline fiercely competed with Air France on both the French domestic market and on the routes to the French overseas territories.

In February 1999, Swissair acquired a 49% stake in the airline as a part of its "hunter strategy". So, in 2000, it joined Swissair Group and consequentially the struggling Qualifier Group alliance. The management of Alexandre Couvelaire, head of Euralair (and friend of French president Jacques Chirac), did not prevent the company from continuing its irresistible decline.

=== Another merger ===
Due to inappropriate fleet management and overcapacity, the airline quickly accumulated huge debts and consequently ceased operations (possibly as a result of the bursting of the dot-com bubble and the early 2000s recession which followed). In late March 2001, at the initiative of Swissair Group, AOM merged the operations with Air Liberté and Air Littoral, equally ill-fated acquisitions by the declining Swiss group. In April the new company adopted the name AOM/Air Liberté However, it survived only thanks to funding from Swissair, and in May a restructuring plan involving the elimination of a third of jobs was announced. Indeed, Swissair Group, was facing financial difficulties as well. On 15 June, the company filed for bankruptcy and was placed under court supervision for three months. At the end of this period, two potential buyers came forward: Marc Rochet and Jean-Charles Corbet, an employee of the national airline. Following a standoff between management and unions, and under pressure from the then Minister of Transport, the airline was taken over in July (two months before the September 11 attacks) for a symbolic 1 €uro by Jean-Charles Corbet, an Air France pilot. In this deal, Swissair committed to paying 1.3 billion French francs starting in August to finance a restructuring that would result in the elimination of 1,405 jobs. On 22 September the airline was renamed Air Lib.

== Destinations ==
AOM French Airlines served the following destinations:

=== France ===
- Marseille – Marseille Provence Airport
- Nice – Nice Côte d'Azur Airport
- Paris – Orly Airport
- Perpignan – Llabanère Airport
- Toulon – Toulon-Hyères Airport

=== French overseas departments and territories ===
- French Guiana
  - Cayenne – Cayenne-Rochambeau Airport
- Guadeloupe
  - Pointe-à-Pitre – Pointe-à-Pitre International Airport
  - Saint Martin – Princess Juliana International Airport
- Martinique
  - Fort-de-France – Le Lamentin Airport
- New Caledonia
  - Nouméa – La Tontouta International Airport
- Réunion
  - Saint-Denis – Roland Garros Airport
- Tahiti
  - Papeete – Faa'a International Airport

=== International routes ===
Australia

- Sydney – Sydney Airport (Paris-Colombo-Sydney-Nouméa from November 1995, ceased 2001.)

Bahamas

- Nassau – Lynden Pindling International Airport

Cuba

- Havana – José Martí International Airport
- Varadero – Juan Gualberto Gómez Airport

Dominican Republic

- Punta Cana – Punta Cana International Airport

Ecuador

- Quito – Old Mariscal Sucre International Airport

Japan

- Tokyo – Narita International Airport

Libya

- Tripoli – Tripoli International Airport

Maldives

- Malé – Velana International Airport

Sri Lanka

- Colombo – Bandaranaike International Airport (Paris-Colombo-Sydney-Nouméa from November 1995, ceased 2001.)

Switzerland

- Zürich – Zürich Airport

Thailand

- Bangkok – Don Mueang International Airport (Paris-Bangkok-Nouméa, until November 1995.)

United States

- Los Angeles – Los Angeles International Airport

Vietnam

- Ho Chi Minh City – Tan Son Nhat International Airport

== Fleet ==
AOM French Airlines has operated the following aircraft throughout its existence:

AOM French Airlines fleet
Aircraft	Total	Introduced	Retired	Notes
Airbus A300B4	1	1999	2000	Leased from TransAer International Airlines.
Airbus A340-200	3	1999	2001	
Airbus A340-300	2	2000	2001	
Boeing 737-200	1	1996	1996	Leased from Air Toulouse.
Boeing 737-500	3	1998	2000	Leased from LOT Polish Airlines.
Boeing 747-200B	1	1992	1993	
Douglas DC-8-62CF	1	1992	1992	
Douglas DC-8-73	1	1992	1992	Leased to Air Sweden.
Fokker 100	1	1996	1996	Leased from Transwede Airways.
McDonnell Douglas DC-10-30	15	1990	2001	One crashed as Cubana Flight 1216.
McDonnell Douglas MD-82	1	1994	1994	Leased from Meridiana.
McDonnell Douglas MD-83	14	1992	2001	
McDonnell Douglas MD-87	1	1995	1996	Leased from Transwede Airways.
