= Journées Information Eaux =

Water science conference in France

Coordinates: 46°34′06″N 0°23′02″E

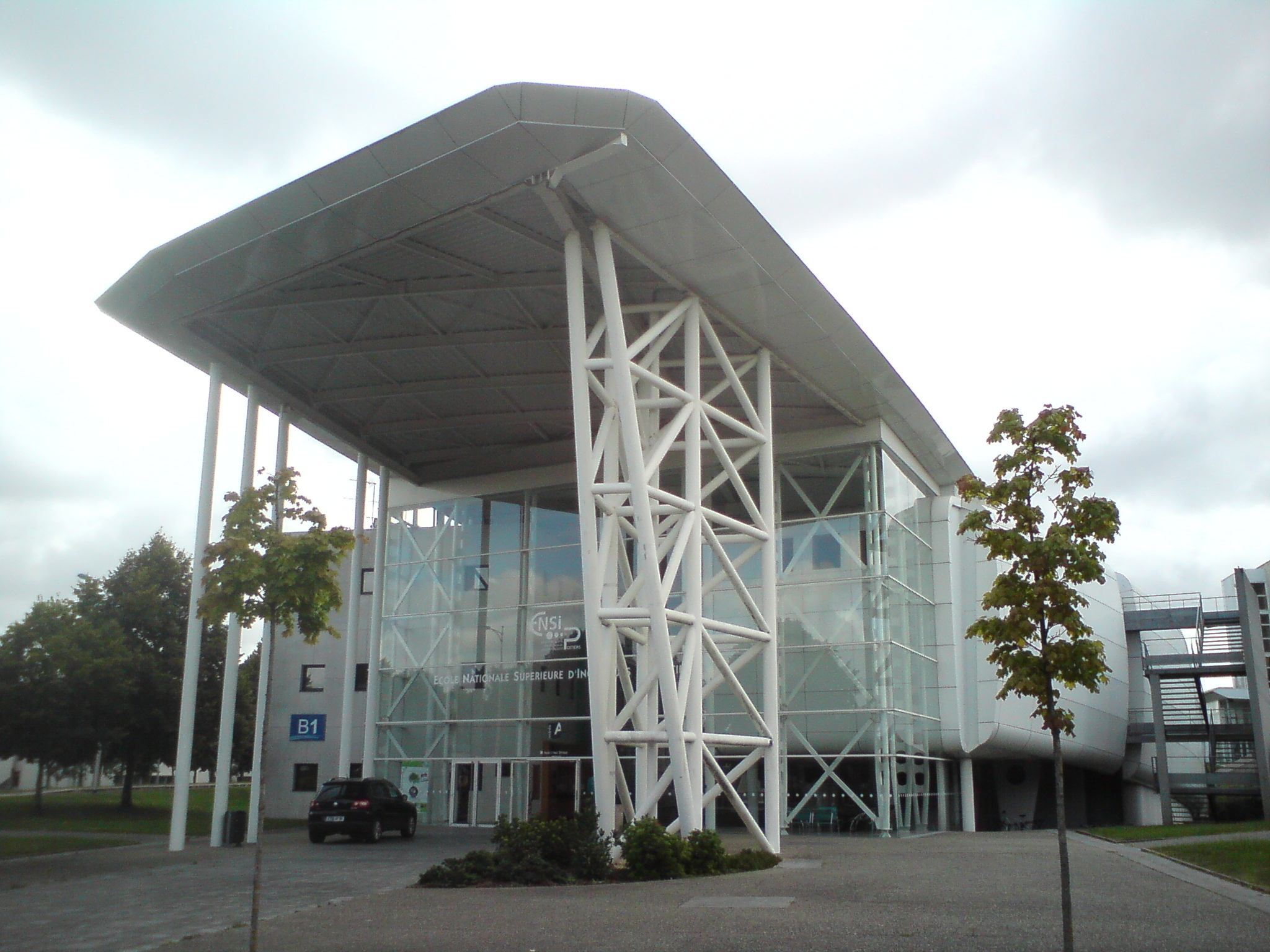
The ENSIP, where this seminar takes place

The Journées Information Eaux (JIE) (in English: Waters Information Days) are a series of conferences about water from famous scientists. It is located at the ENSIP in Poitiers (France) and organized by the Apten and LCME (IC2MP).

== Description ==
The first JIE started in 1974, and are now a biannual event There are almost 400 participants and eighty conferences which are presented in three rooms.

The JIE 2012 was the 20th edition and took place from 25 to 27 September.

It was originally created by the University of Poitiers, the before the foundation of the ENSi Poitiers. The organisers are the Apten (Professional association of water treatment and pollution, in French), an alumnus of the graduates of the school from the TEN section, and the LCME (Laboratory of Chemistry and Microbiology of Water, in French), a laboratory which is part of IC2MP, a CNRS-University of Poitiers laboratory.

Three French ministers came at the JIE in 1992 and 1996: Hubert Curien, Ségolène Royal, Jean-Pierre Raffarin.
