= IC2MP =

Multidisciplinary research institute

Coordinates: 46.5680°N 0.3834°E

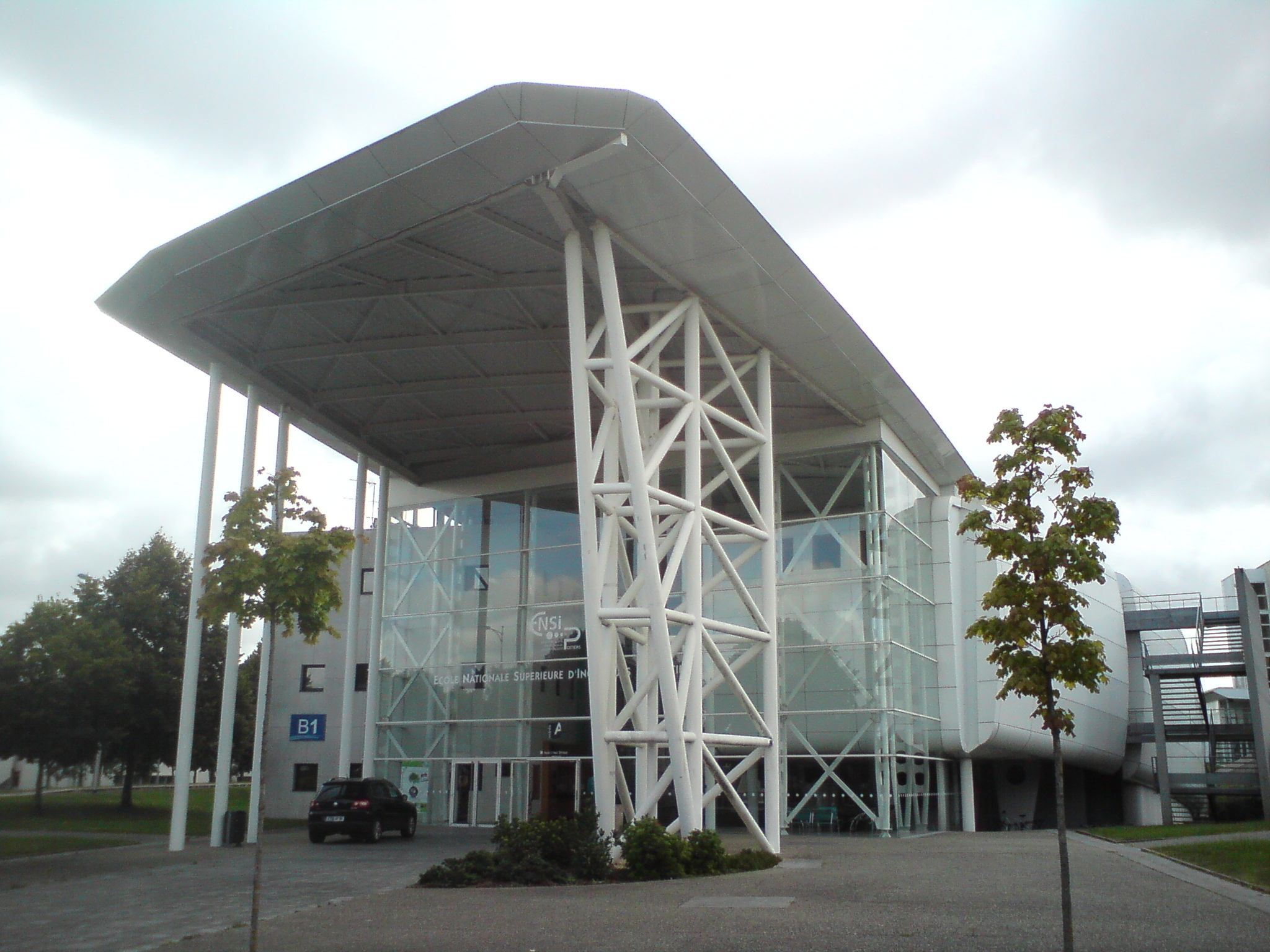
ENSIP where a part of the laboratory is

The IC2MP (Institute of Chemistry of Poitiers : Materials and Natural Resources) is a multidisciplinary French joint research unit of the University of Poitiers (France) and the CNRS.

== Laboratory ==
The IC2MP is a research laboratory mainly in chemistry and geology. It was created on January 1, 2012, which fields of expertise include the study of materials (clay, catalysts,..), natural environments (waters, soils,..) and the reactions (natural or caused). The major application fields relate to catalysis, synthesis, decontamination, use of natural resources.

The IC2MP was born from the merger of four laboratories of Poitiers University (SFA and ENSI Poitiers) and CNRS located on the university campus of Poitiers.

- HydrASA : Hydrogeology, Clays, Soils, Alteration, situated in the South of the campus;
- LACCO: Laboratory Catalysis in Organic Chemistry.
- LCME: Laboratory Chemistry and Microbiology of Water. Created in 1974 under the name of Laboratory of Chemistry of Water and Nuisances, then changed in 1996 to become the Laboratory of Water and Environment Chemistry; it has then become LCME in 2008.
- SRSN : Synthesis and Reactivity of Natural Substances.

The institute IC2MP includes five research teams:

- Water, organic geochemistry, health;
- HydrASA - Hydrogeology, clay soils and alterations;
- SAMCat - From the active site to the catalysis material;
- Calalysis and unconventional media;
- Organic synthesis.

The scientific team « Water, organic geochemistry, health », with the ENSIP and the APTEN, are the initiators of the ‘Water Information Day’ (the Journées Information Eaux), a bi-annual event which occurs around the opening of the academic year.

== Research ==
- In 2008, the discovery of more than 250 well-preserved fossils in Gabon brought, for the first time, the proof of the existence of pluricellular organisms which lived 2.1 billion years ago, a crucial advance in the understanding of the origin of life. So far, the first forms of complex life (with multiple cells) previously found were dated back 600 million years. These works were published in 2010 in the magazine Nature. This major and unexpected discovery, conducted by the team of Professor Abderrazak El Albani gave birth to a cross-disciplinary research project within the IC2MP Institute aiming at studying organic and primitive materials and Paleo-environments.
- Cancer: a new therapeutic molecule which attacks only the tumourous cells. In 2012, a study led by the researchers of the IC2MP, supported by the Cancéropôle Grand Ouest, resulted in the finalization of the therapeutic targeting system, which is programmed to transport a powerful anti-cancer agent through the tumorous cells, without affecting the healthy tissue usually damaged by classical therapies. The validity of this concept was demonstrated on mouses, in the context of the treatment of a solid tumor. This study, which represents a new hope in the fight against cancer, has been published in the international edition of Angewandte Chemie as a “Very Important Paper” (VIP). This study was directed by Sébastien Papot, lecturer at University of Poitiers and leader of the Research Group “Programmed Molecular Systems”, part of the research team Organic Synthesis.

== See also ==
- Institut Pprime, a laboratory of physics in Poitiers
