= Minerve (airline) =

Airline of France (1975–1992)

IATA	ICAO	Call sign
IW	MIN	Minerve
- Founded: 1975; 51 years ago
- Ceased operations: 1992; 34 years ago (merged with Air Outre Mer to form AOM French Airlines)
- Headquarters: Paris, France

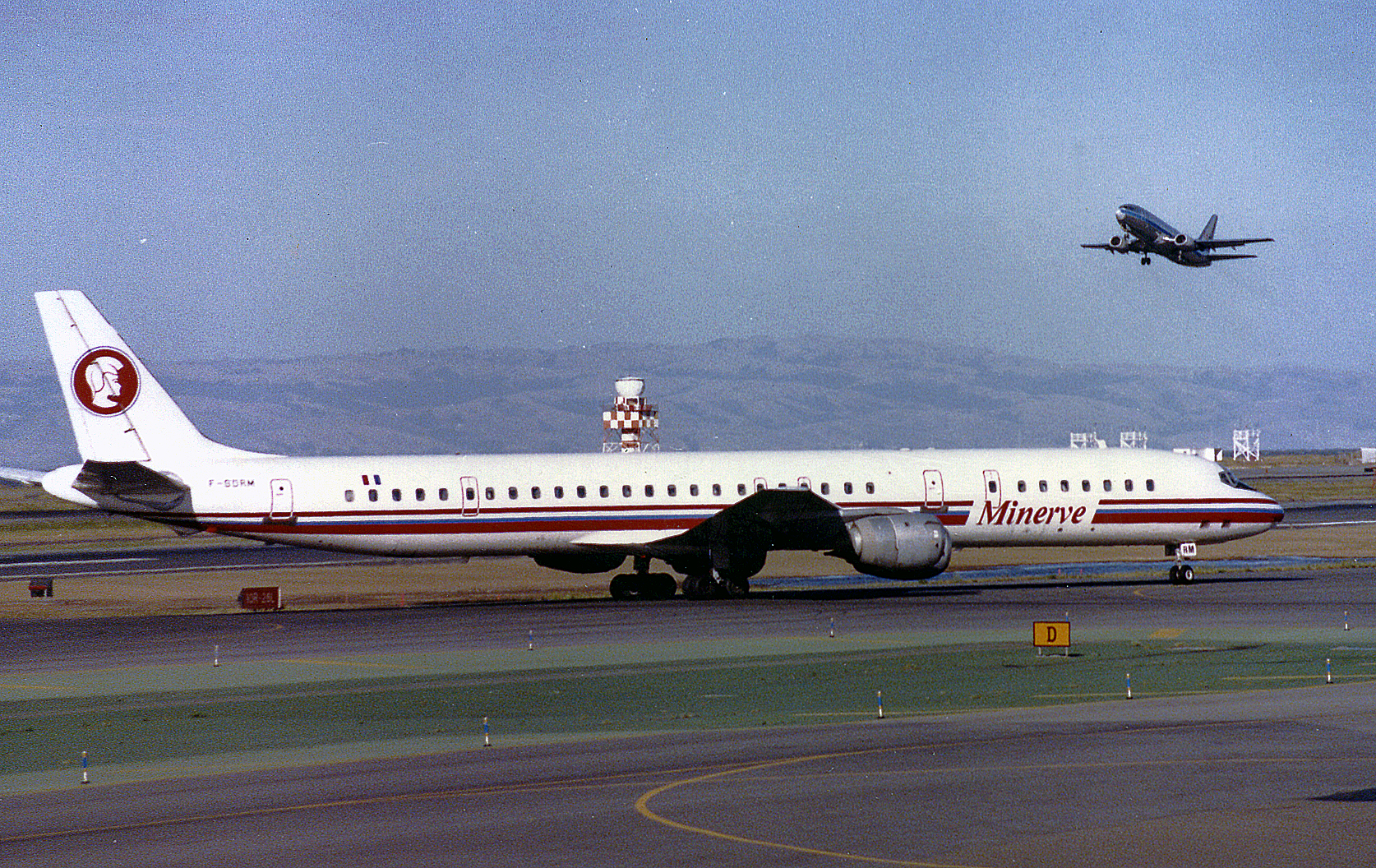
A Douglas DC-8-73 of Minerve at San Francisco International Airport (1990)

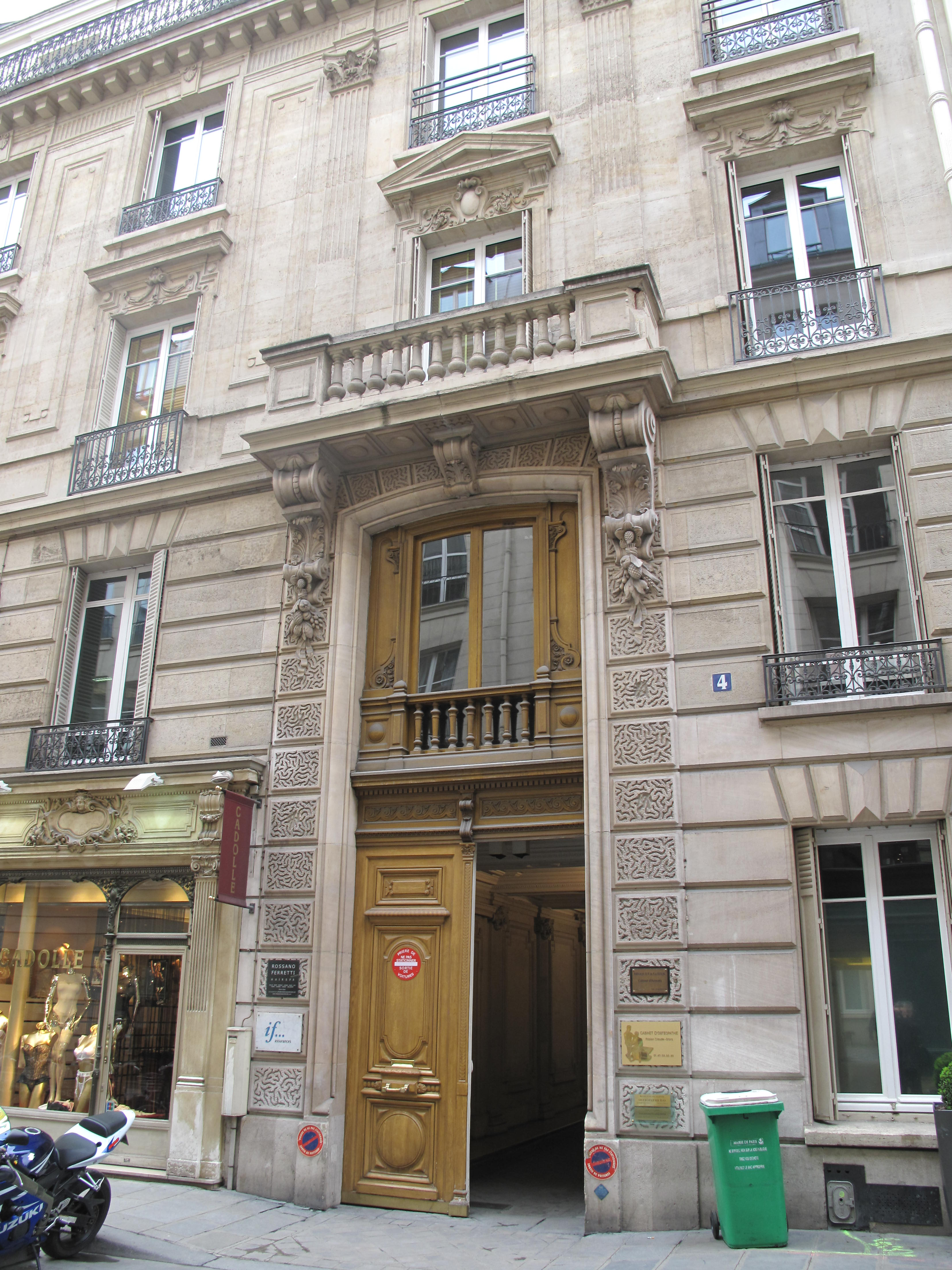
Former head office

Minerve (IATA: IW, ICAO: MIN, call sign: Minerve) was a French airline, headquartered in the 1st arrondissement of Paris, that operated from 1975 until it merged with AOM to form AOM French Airlines in 1992.

== History ==
Minerve began operations in 1975 using Sud Aviation Caravelle aircraft on charter flights from Paris-Le Bourget airport. Permission was granted for charter flights to the United States in 1983 and those were operated first with Douglas DC-8 jets and later on with a Boeing 747-200 wide body jetliner.

For charter flights to the Mediterranean and North Africa the Caravelles were used until replaced in 1987 by McDonnell Douglas MD-83. Minerve wanted to expand into North America and created a subsidiary in Canada called Minerve Canada, but that venture did not last long and it had a negative effect on the parent company. Other investments in Jet Alsace and Jet Fret created more financial burdens which led to the sale of 50% of the stock to the tour operator Club Méditerranée. To expand operations, three McDonnell Douglas DC-10-30 wide body jetliners were acquired for long-range services.

In 1991 Minerve was operating scheduled passenger services between Paris and Bangkok, Guadeloupe, Martinique, Nice, San Francisco and Tahiti with DC-10-30 jets being primarily operated on the international routes. The same year, the airline published a joint timetable with French air carrier Air Liberté.

In 1992 Minerve merged with Air Outre Mer to form AOM French Airlines.

== Fleet details ==
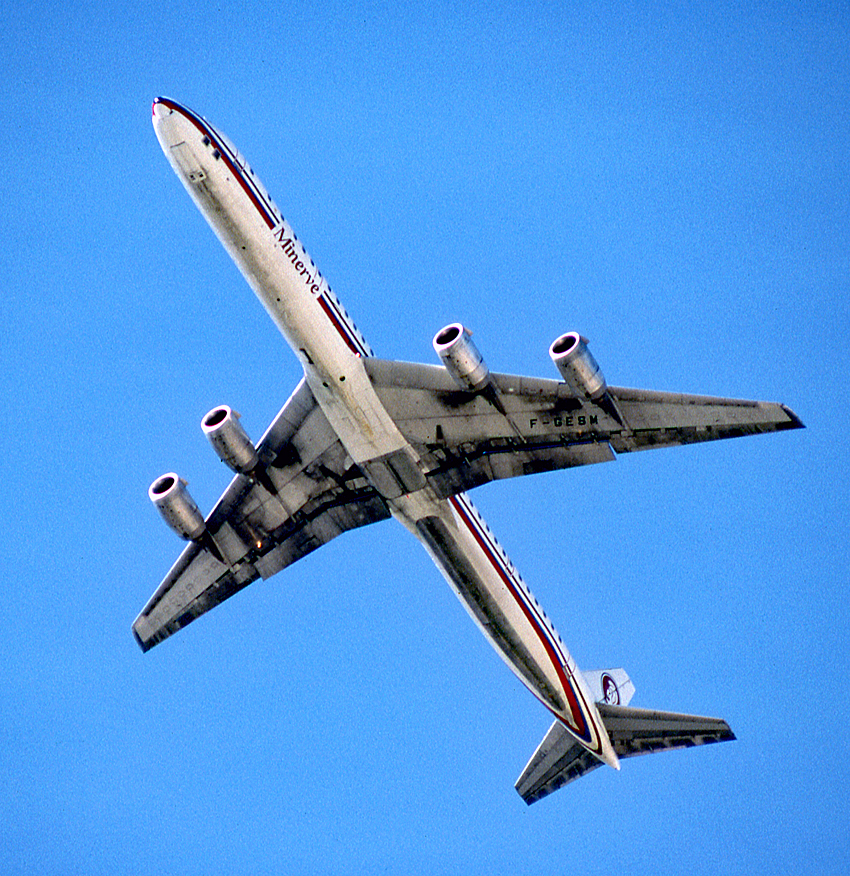
Minerve DC-8-73CF F-GESM departing Gatwick Airport in 1990

The Minerve fleet totalled six aircraft in 1982 (four Caravelles, and two DC-8-53). The corresponding number in 1989 was 13, which included all of the types below excepting the Caravelle.

- 1982; 4 – Sud Aviation SE-210 Caravelle
- 1982; 2/1 – Douglas DC-8-53 (only one of this type in 1989)
- 1989; 1 – Douglas DC-8-61
- 1989; 1 – Douglas DC-8-62
- 1989; 2 – Douglas DC-8-73
- 1989; 1 – Boeing 747-200
- 1989; 6 – McDonnell Douglas MD-83
- 1989; 1 – McDonnell Douglas DC-10-30
