= Lionel Guérin =

French politician

- Born: Guérin
- Education: École nationale supérieure de mécanique et d'aérotechnique École nationale de l'aviation civile
- Occupations: Founding President of Airlinair and President of Transavia France, President of Fédération nationale de l'aviation marchande
- Employer(s): Airlinair; Transavia France
- Known for: Founding President of Airlinair and President of Transavia France
- Children: 2
- Website: http://www.travelgreen.fr

Lionel Guérin (French pronunciation: [ljɔnɛl ɡeʁɛ̃]) is a French chief executive officer and politician.

== Biography ==
=== Training ===
Lionel Guérin is an aerospace engineer graduate from École nationale supérieure de mécanique et d'aérotechnique and airline pilot graduate from École nationale de l'aviation civile.

=== Career in business ===
Graduate engineer, he is hired as technical Director at Europe Aéro Service responsible for fleet maintenance. After his training at ÉNAC, he became an airline pilot at Uni Air, Air Inter and Air France airlines. On the French national airline, he became Captain Airbus A320, flight instructor and responsible for operational standards, before creating the regional airline Airlinair. Since February 2007, he is also President of Transavia France.

In September 2011, he is tipped to become chairman of Air France and successor of Pierre-Henri Gourgeon. Supported by Jean-Cyril Spinetta, he is ultimately not retained for the benefit of Alexandre de Juniac.

=== Political activities ===
Since 2003, Lionel Guérin is President of the Fédération nationale de l'aviation marchande and the Chambre syndicale du transport aérien. He is also member of the board of directors of the Conseil supérieur de l'aviation marchande. From 2006 to 2011, he is adviser at the Banque de France of Creteil.

Lionel Guerin is also an environmental activist, fond of parrots and supporting sustainable aviation.

=== Personal life ===
Lionel Guérin is married and has two children.

== Award ==
- Knight of the Légion d'honneur.
- Officer of the French National Order of Merit

== Bibliography ==
- Info-Pilote number 612, Paris, Info-Pilote, March 2007
