= École nationale supérieure d'ingénieurs de Poitiers =

Engineering school for environmental protection

Coordinates: 46.3412°N 0.2248°W

ENSI Poitiers
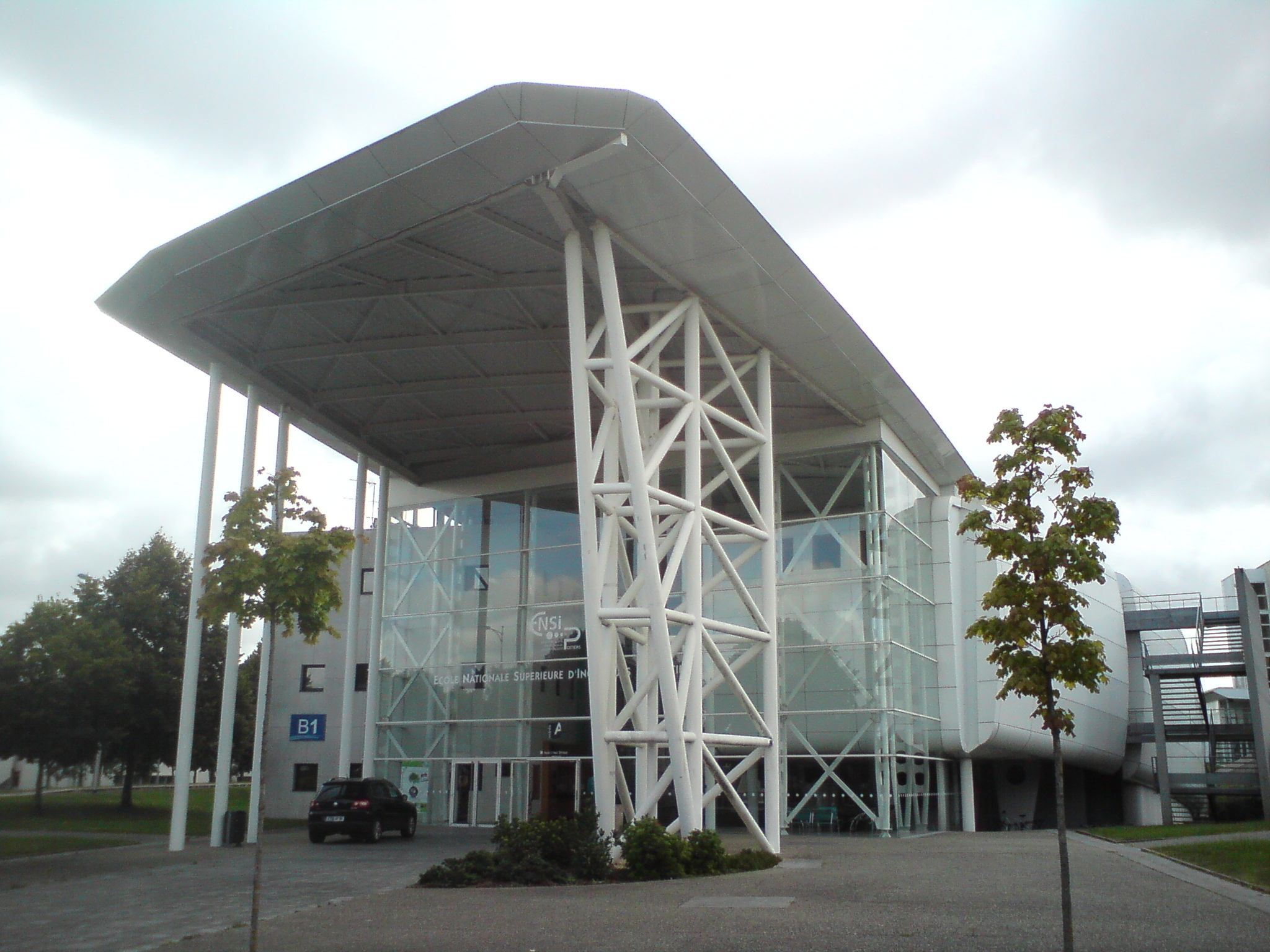
- Motto: Ingénierie pour la protection de l'environnement
- Type: Grande école
- Established: 1984
- Affiliations: Université de Poitiers, CDEFI
- President: Jean-Yves Chenebault
- Students: 480
- Location: Poitiers, France
- Campus: Suburban
- Website: ensip.univ-poitiers.fr

ENSI Poitiers (École Nationale Supérieure d’Ingénieurs de Poitiers), also known as ENSIP, is an engineering grande école in Poitiers, France. Established in 1984, it is affiliated with the University of Poitiers and focuses on training engineers in environmental protection. It offers diplomas in energy and environment (EE) and in water and civil engineering (GEGC).

== History ==
Its roots come from Institut de sciences et techniques de Poitiers, a department of the University of Poitiers created in 1972. The Graduate Engineering School took over from it and was established in 1984. Then its buildings have been moved in 1996, in the campus, and it is located with the number B1.

At the beginning, the French grande école was called École supérieure d'ingénieurs de Poitiers (ESIP). In 2010 it changed its name.

The presidents of ENSIP were chronologically Michel Blanchard, Marcel Doré, Jean-Hugues Thomassin, Bernard Legube and Jean-Yves Chenebault.

== Admission ==
The admission is decided after concourse at the end of preparatory classes, a highly selective system. It is also possible to be admitted after a Diplôme universitaire de technologie for the best of their promotions.

== Diploma ==
Students can receive two diplomas: Energy and Water and civil engineering which lead to :

- The Energetic, systems and electrical Engineering department
  - Energetics
  - Lighting, Acoustics and Thermal studies
  - Electrical Energy Optimization and Control
  - Environment and Transportation
- The Environmental and Civil Engineering department
  - Water and waste treatment
  - Construction and Geotechnics

In partnership with Centrale Lille and ISAE-ENSMA, ENSIP is a part of the prestigious International Master's Program in Turbulence. At the end of this highly selective two-year program, students are awarded a master's degree in Fluid Dynamics and Turbulence.

ENSIP students can also develop a double-competence with IAE Poitiers and their master's in business administration.

Three laboratories support the school:

- LIAS: a computer laboratory after the merge of LAII (Laboratoire Automatique et Informatique Industrielle) and on other laboratory.
- IC2MP: a chemical laboratory which gathers HYDRASA (HYDRogéologie, Argiles, Sols, Altération), LACCO (LAboratoire Catalyse en Chimie Organique) and LCME (Laboratoire Chimie et Microbiologie de l'Eau) from ENSIP and another one.
- Institut Pprime: a physical laboratory which regroups LEA (Laboratoire Etudes Aerodynamiques) and LET (Laboratoire Etudes Thermiques) from the ENSIP added by four more laboratories
