= Brive–Laroche Airport =

Closed French airport in the Dordogne

Brive–La Roche Airport Aérodrome de Brive – La Roche
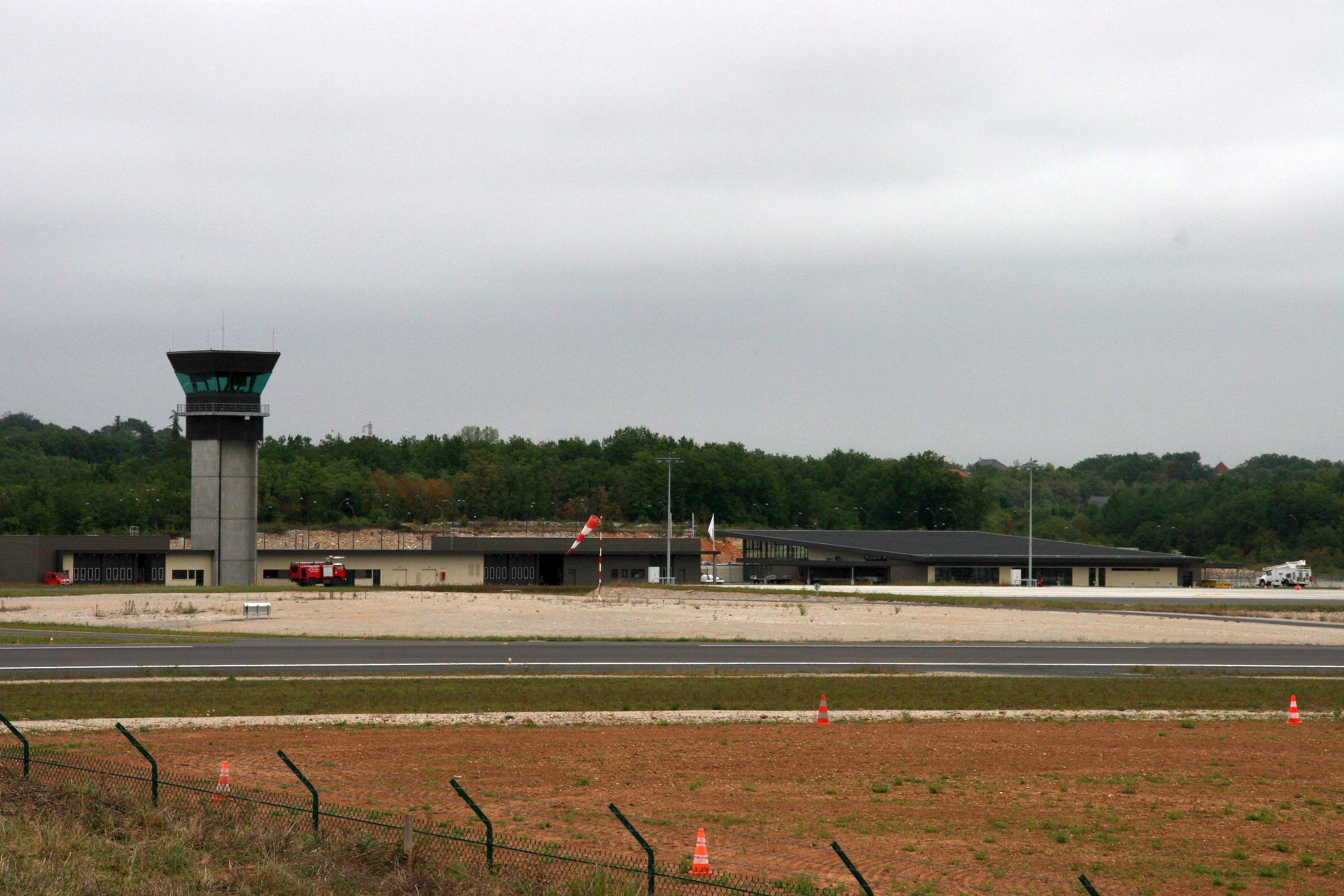
- IATA: ~~BVE~~; ICAO: LFBV

Summary
- Airport type: Public
- Operator: Communauté d'Agglomération de Brive
- Serves: Brive-la-Gaillarde, France
- Elevation AMSL: 379 ft / 116 m
- Coordinates: 45°08′59″N 001°28′28″E

Map
- Location of airport in France

Runways
Direction	Length		Surface
Direction	m	ft	Surface
14/32	1,400	4,593	Asphalt
- Source: French AIP

Brive–La Roche Airport or Aérodrome de Brive – La Roche (IATA: ~~BVE~~, ICAO: LFBV) was an airport located 3.5 kilometres (1.9 NM) west of Brive-la-Gaillarde, a commune of the Corrèze department in the Nouvelle-Aquitaine region of France.

== History ==
As of February 2011, the aerodrome is due for closure, and only accepts locally based planes. A new airport known as Brive–Souillac Airport or Brive–Dordogne Valley Airport (French: Aéroport Brive – Vallée de la Dordogne, 45°02′23″N 001°29′08″E) opened on June 15, 2010. The Airlinair (now HOP!) flights to and from Paris–Orly airport have been transferred to this new airport as have all other passenger services.
