= Hervé Stevenin =

European aquanaut at the European Astronaut Centre (born 1962)

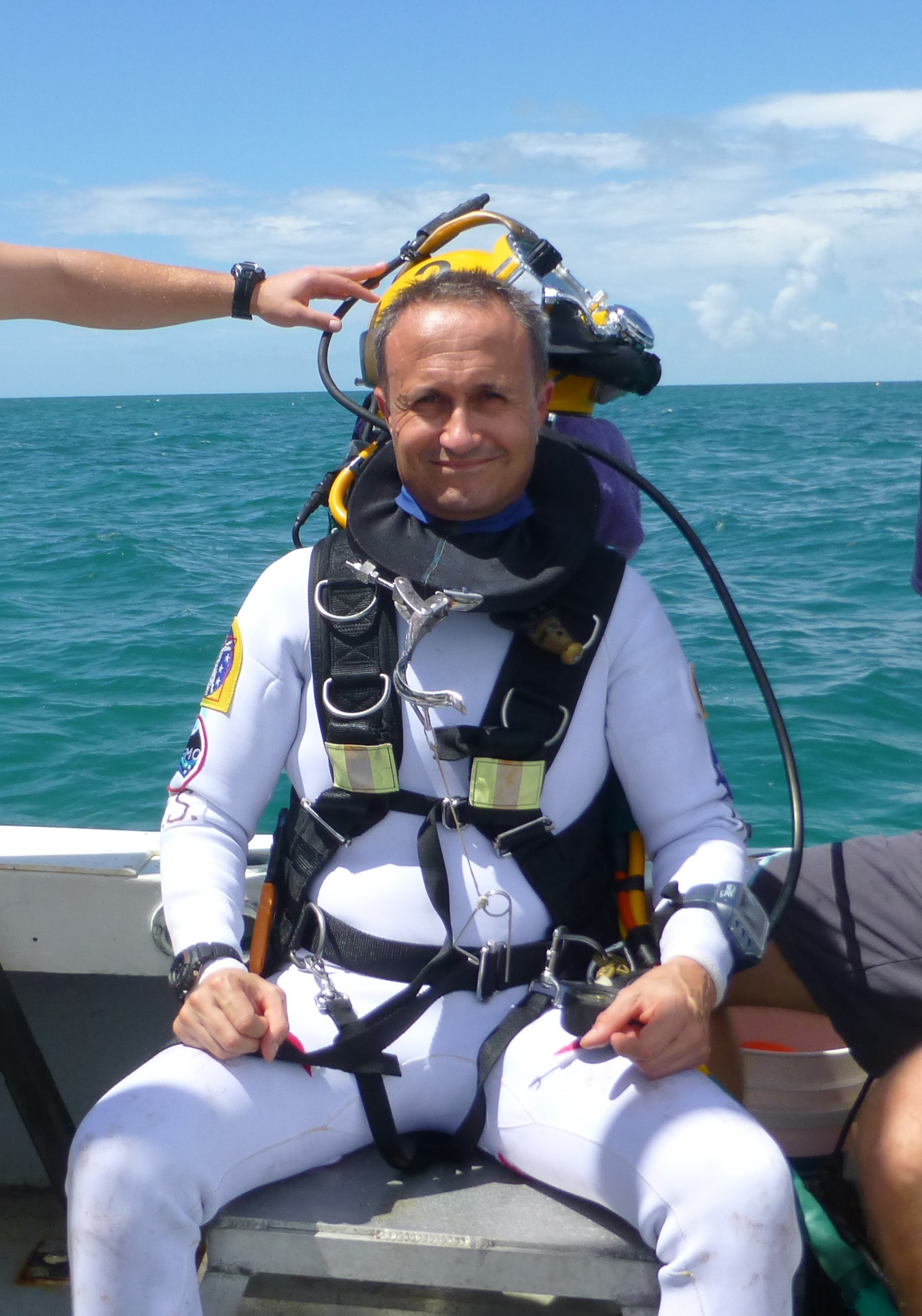
- Born: 25 September 1962 (age 63); Arcachon, France
- Education: Aerospace Engineering, ISAE-ENSMA, ISAE-SUPAERO, PADI Diving Instructor
- Occupations: Engineer, astronaut instructor, European EVA expert, parabolic flight astronaut trainer
- Employer(s): ESA, European Astronaut Centre
- Known for: Aquanaut
- Title: Head of NBF Operations and EVA Training Unit

Hervé Stevenin (born 25 September 1962) is a European aquanaut leading ESA Neutral Buoyancy Facility Operations and the EVA Training Unit at the European Astronaut Centre (EAC) in Cologne, Germany. He served as an aquanaut on the NASA Extreme Environment Mission Operations 19 (NEEMO 19) crew.

Stevenin has received extensive astronaut training and is the only "non-astronaut" European citizen with spacewalk training experience inside both NASA's Extravehicular Mobility Unit (EMU) and Russian Orlan space suit. Stevenin has more than 20 years' experience in astronaut training and providing operational support for astronauts.

== Education and career ==
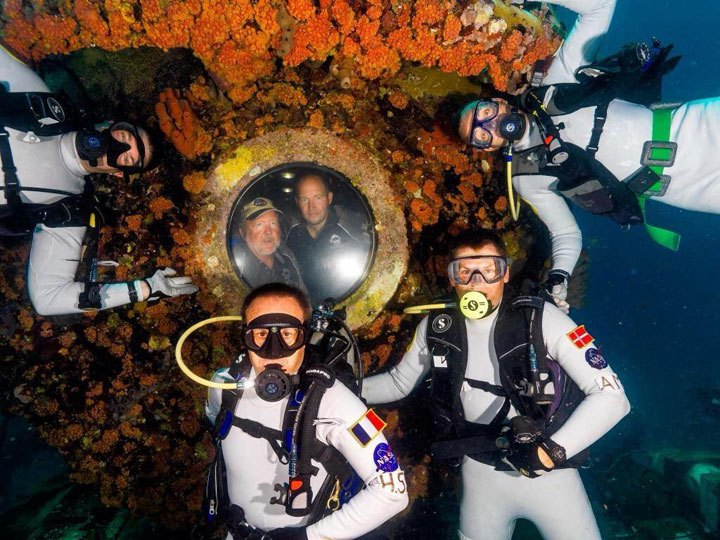
Stevenin (second from left) during NEEMO 19

Stevenin graduated as an aerospace engineer from the Institut Supérieur de l'Aéronautique et de l'Espace (ISAE-ENSMA & ISAE-SUPAERO) specialising in orbital and space mechanics.

He worked for 12 years at the French government space agency CNES as SPOT (satellite) system operations engineer for four years and as manager of the Crew Training and Operations for six years for three French astronaut missions to the Mir space station. He was a French Capcom in the Russian TSUP Control Center in Moscow for these three missions.

When he joined ESA and the European Astronaut Centre in 1999 as the Head of the Payload Training Unit in the Astronaut Training Division, he developed and implemented the first ESA Payload Training Programme at EAC for the International Space Station astronauts and was later trained and certified as Columbus (ISS module) Operator.

Stevenin served three times as member of the Search and Rescue Team in Kazakhstan for the spacecraft landing of European astronauts.

In 2004 Stevenin received spacewalk training in NASA's Extravehicular Mobility Unit (EMU) spacesuits at the Johnson Space Center and at the Neutral Buoyancy Laboratory in Houston, and completed in 2011 six weeks of EVA training and certification in the Russian Orlan space suit at the Yuri Gagarin Cosmonaut Training Center (Star City, Russia), in Moscow with ESA astronaut Andreas Mogensen.

This spacewalk training experience led to the development and implementation of Europe's unique EVA Pre-Familiarisation, Proficiency Rebuilt & Recurrent Training course, which is now part of ESA's training for European astronauts. Stevenin is ESA's spacewalk instructor for European astronauts and has leads since 2007 the team that develops and implements spacewalk training at EAC. He has provided EVA training at EAC to the six European astronauts selected by ESA in 2009.

Stevenin applied to become an astronaut in Europe's astronaut selection of 2009 and was one of the last 45 finalists out of 8413 astronaut applicants from 17 European countries.

Stevenin is also ESA's Zero-G Instructor for European astronauts in parabolic flights and has logged more than 800 parabolas in microgravity experiencing almost five hours of weightlessness in total on board Reduced gravity aircraft (the Caravelle Zero-G, the Airbus A300 ZERO-G and NASA's KC-135/930).

Stevenin served as EUROCOM, the European capsule communicator (CAPCOM) that communicates from Columbus Control Centre with astronauts in orbit. He led the Eurocom Team from 2007 to 2012 and served in 2012 as CAPCOM and support diver of the 16th NASA Extreme Environment Mission Operations (NEEMO 16).

In September 2013, Stevenin and ESA astronaut Jean-François Clervoy slipped into the roles of Neil Armstrong and Buzz Aldrin for an underwater simulation test of Apollo 11 moonwalk tasks, organised by the Compagnie maritime d'expertises (COMEX) off the coast of Marseille, France. They tested a COMEX-designed prototype training-spacesuit based on the Orlan adapted to simulate Moon gravity.

Stevenin became an aquanaut through his participation in the NASA NEEMO 19 mission simulating undersea a space exploration mission aboard Aquarius, the world only undersea research laboratory with crewmates NASA astronaut Randy Bresnik, ESA astronaut Andreas Mogensen and CSA astronaut Jeremy Hansen. Prior to the NEEMO 19 mission Stevenin was quoted as saying that "It is a privilege to be part of the crew with three astronauts. I am looking forward to take part in this outstanding project to test future concepts for space operations as well as evaluating spacewalk tools, techniques and man–machine interfaces for future space exploration beyond the International Space Station."

== Personal life ==
Stevenin is a certified PADI "Open Water Scuba diving & Nitrox Instructor" and an Emergency First Response (CPR/First Aid/AED) Instructor and has logged more than 400 dives.

He has a private pilot licence (EASA Part-FCL) and was certified in France for aerobatics flights in positive G. He has skydiving experience and has logged 60 parachuting jumps.

He is married and has one daughter.
