= Institut Pprime =

French research laboratory

Coordinates: 46.6615°N 0.3605°E

Institut Pprime (sometimes written Institut P') is a CNRS laboratory created in 2010 and based in Poitiers, France.

== Presentation ==
The institute depends from the University of Poitiers, ENSI Poitiers and Ensma and has the UPR number 3346. It is the second-largest laboratory in engineering science in France with 572 people working for it in 2014. It has locations on both the campus of Poitiers and Futuroscope. It is currently led by Yves Gervais since 2014 after Jean-Paul Bonnet.

The laboratory is sub-divided into three departments:

- Physics and Mechanics of Materials
- Fluids, Thermal and Combustion Sciences
- Mechanics, Structures and Complex Systems

It is the merger of six previous laboratories which were:

- LCD, Laboratoire de combustion et de détonique (Laboratory of Combustion and Detonics) UPR 9028
- LEA, Laboratoire d’études aérodynamiques (Laboratory of Aerodynamic Studies) UMR 6609
- LET, Laboratoire d’études thermiques (Laboratory of Thermal Studies) UMR 6608
- PhyMat, Laboratoire de physique des matériaux (Laboratory of Materials Physics) UMR 6630
- LMPM, Laboratoire de mécanique et physique des matériaux (Laboratory of Mechanics and Physics of Materials) UMR 6617
- LMS, Laboratoire de mécanique des solides (Laboratory of Solid Mechanics) UMR 6610

== See also ==
- IC2MP, a laboratory specializing in chemistry in Poitiers
