= Euralair =

French charter airline

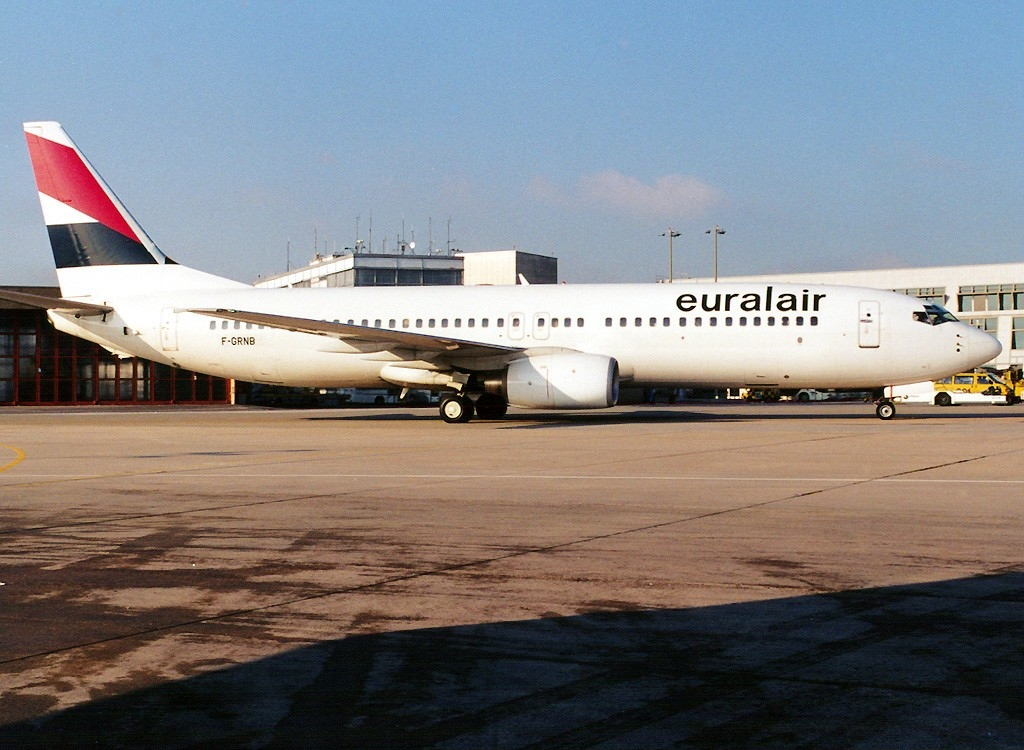
- Boeing 737-800
| IATA | ICAO | Call sign |
|---|---|---|
| RN | ERL | EURALAIR EXECUTIVE |
- Founded: 1962
- Ceased operations: November 2003

Euralair was a charter airline based in France. Euralair was founded in October 1962 by Alexandre Couvelaire as an air-taxi and executive charter company. In 1966 it became charter airline and operated its first charter flights in 1968 when it received the first Fokker F-27 (F-BRHL) on November 11, 1968, and the second (F-BRQL) on October 15, 1969; the last one sold to the Swiss company Belair (as HB-AAZ) in June 1973. In order to develop its charter activity, in November 1971 Euralair bought from Austrian Airline the first Sud Aviation Caravelle VIR (F-BSEL) and in 1973 the second (F-BTDL).

Boeing 737s was the last jetliner type operated in some variants/versions.

In early 1990s the airline took the important decision to delve into scheduled flights. So, on 3 February 1992, it opened the route from Paris (Orly airport) to Madrid with the most modern jetliner of the fleet, the Boeing 737-200.

In November 2003 Euralair had to file for bankruptcy protection and was saved from liquidation when it was bought by Air Horizons.

== Images gallery ==
in strict chronological and livery order

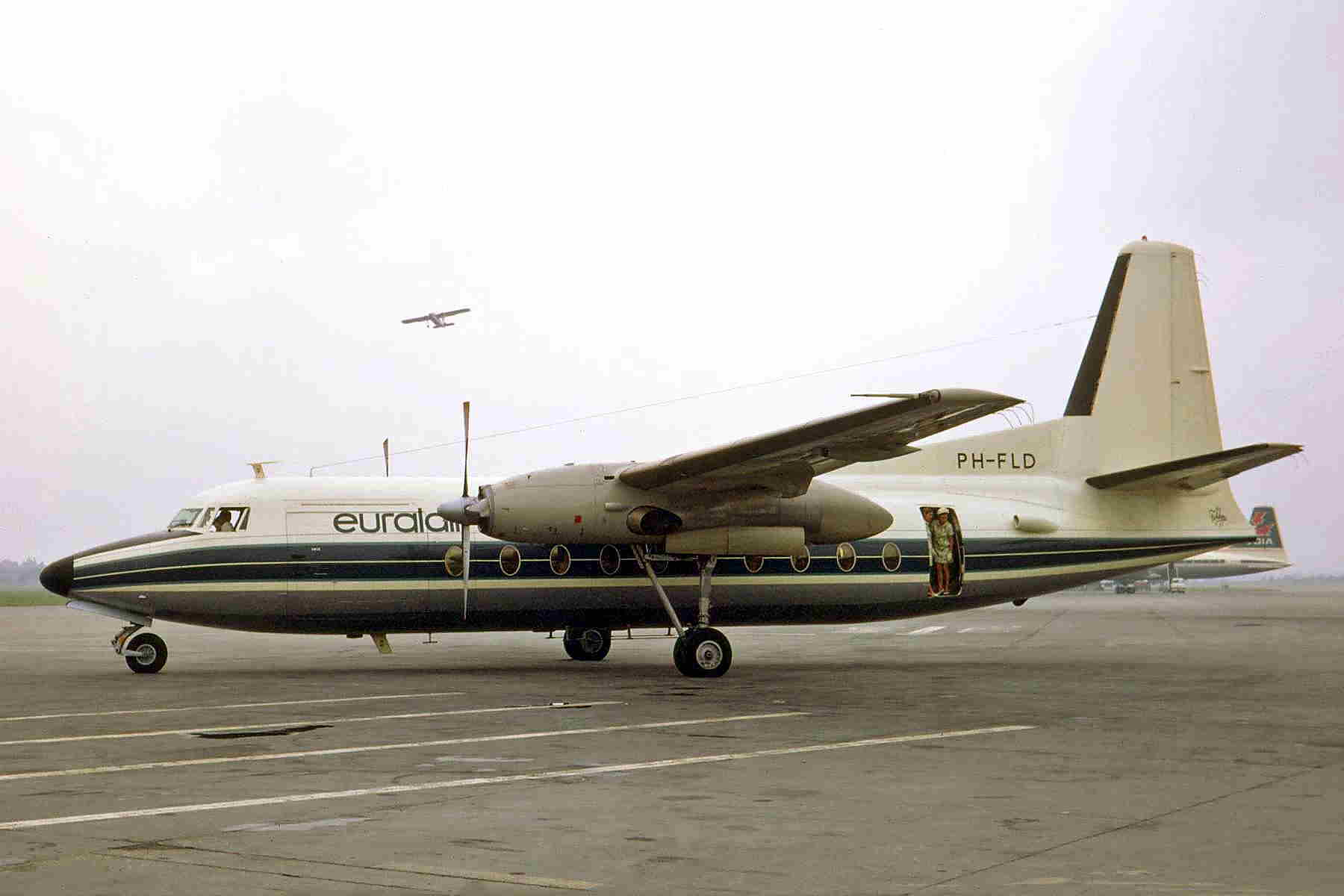
Fokker F27 "Friendship"

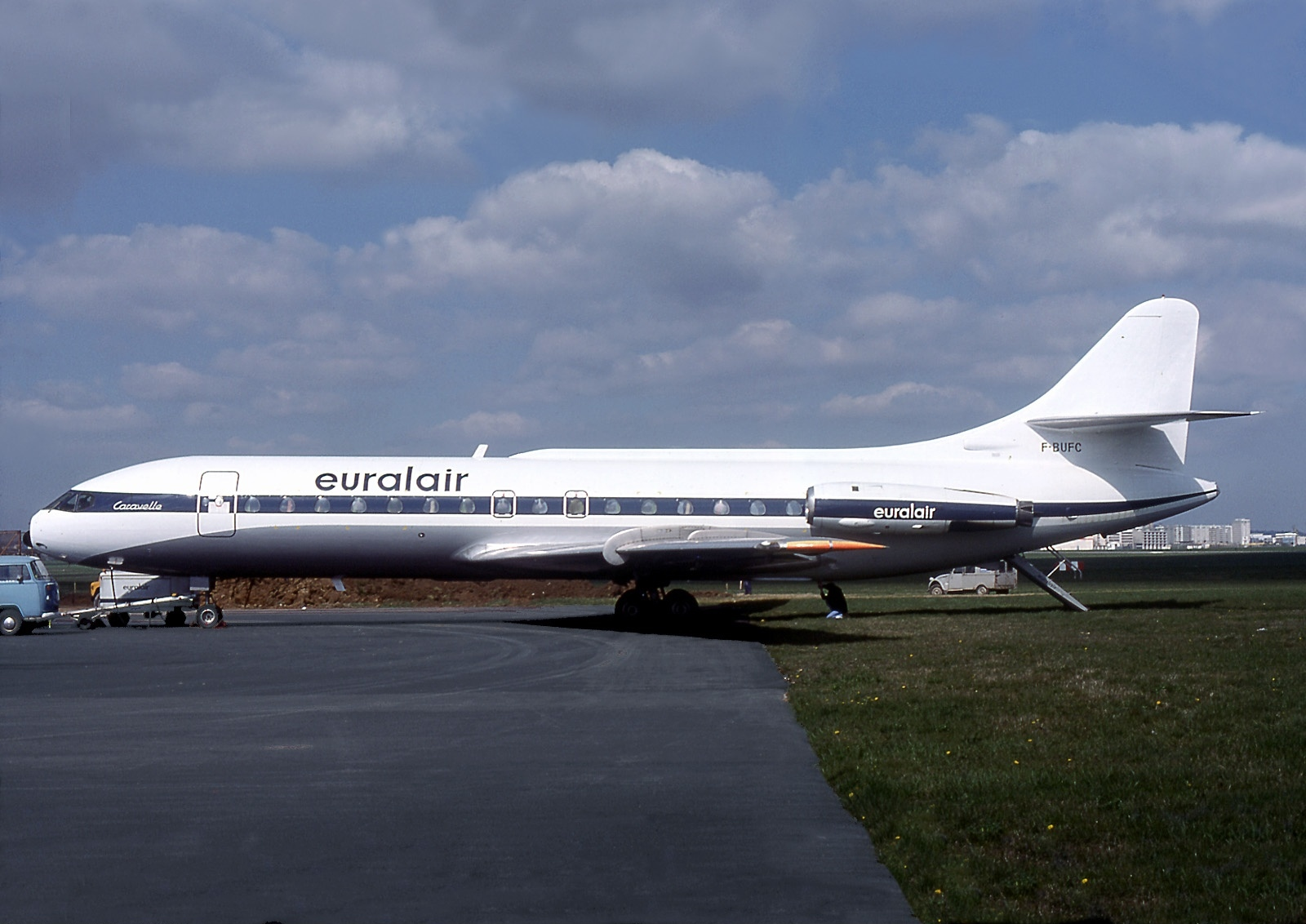
Sud Aviation SE-210 Caravelle

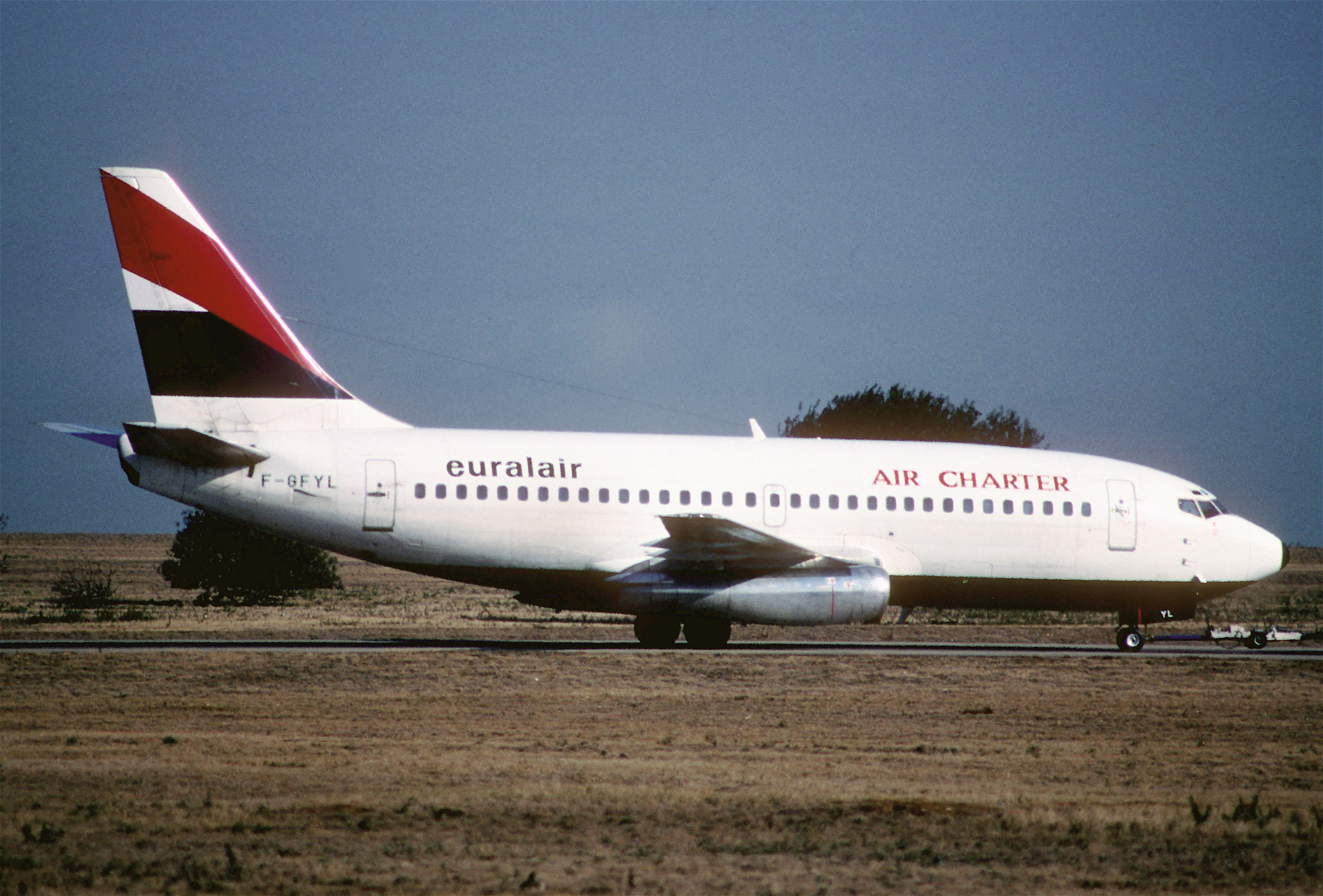
Boeing 737-200

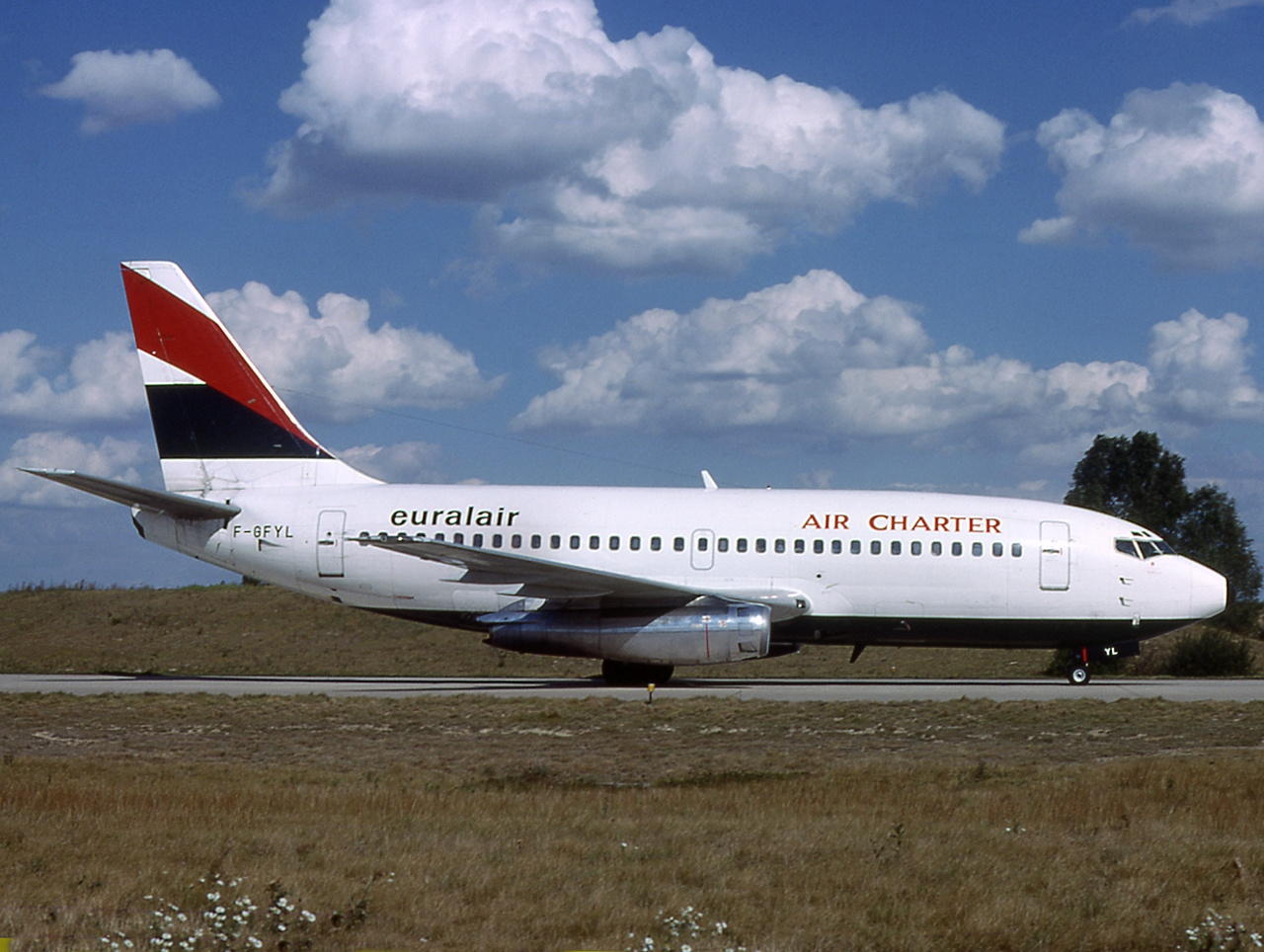
Boeing 737-200 operated on Air Charter behalf

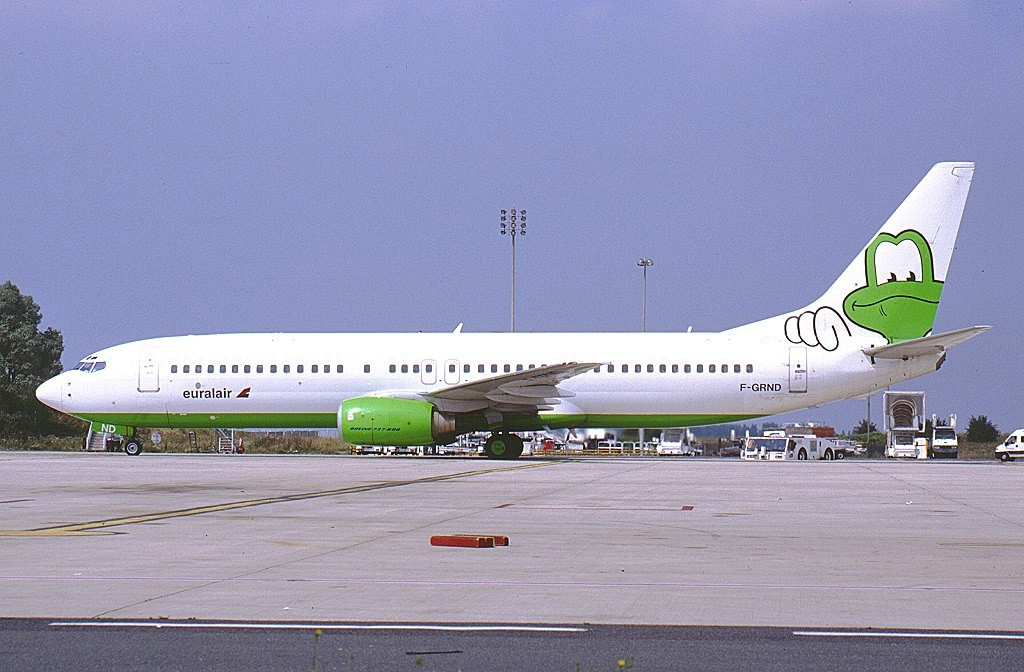
Boeing 737-800 with Go vacations funny tail image

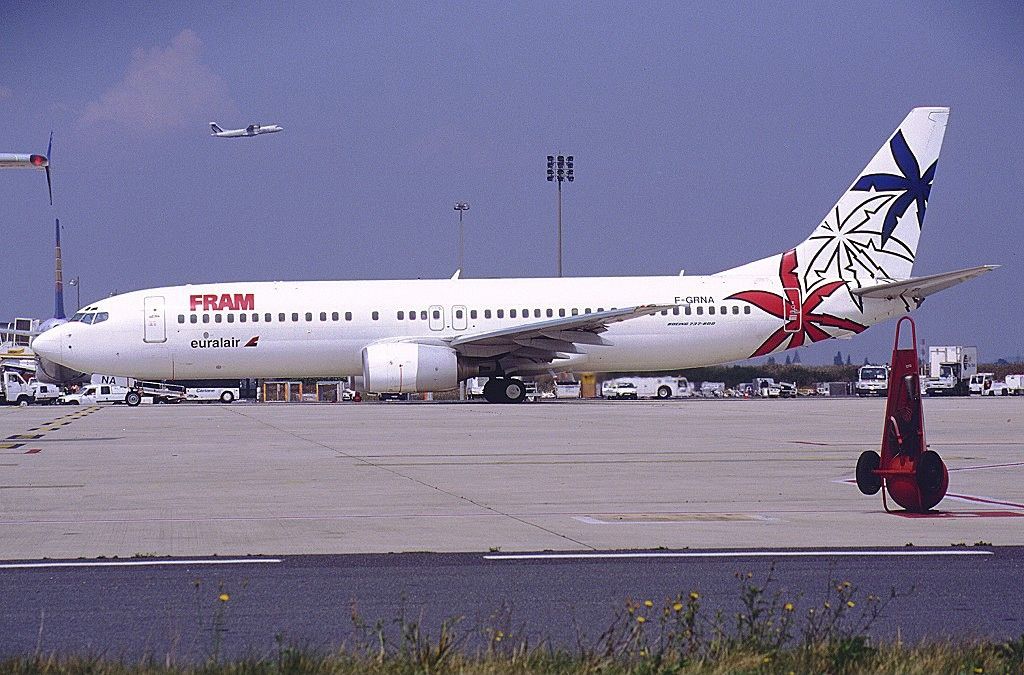
Boeing 737-800 with FRAM titles and tail logo

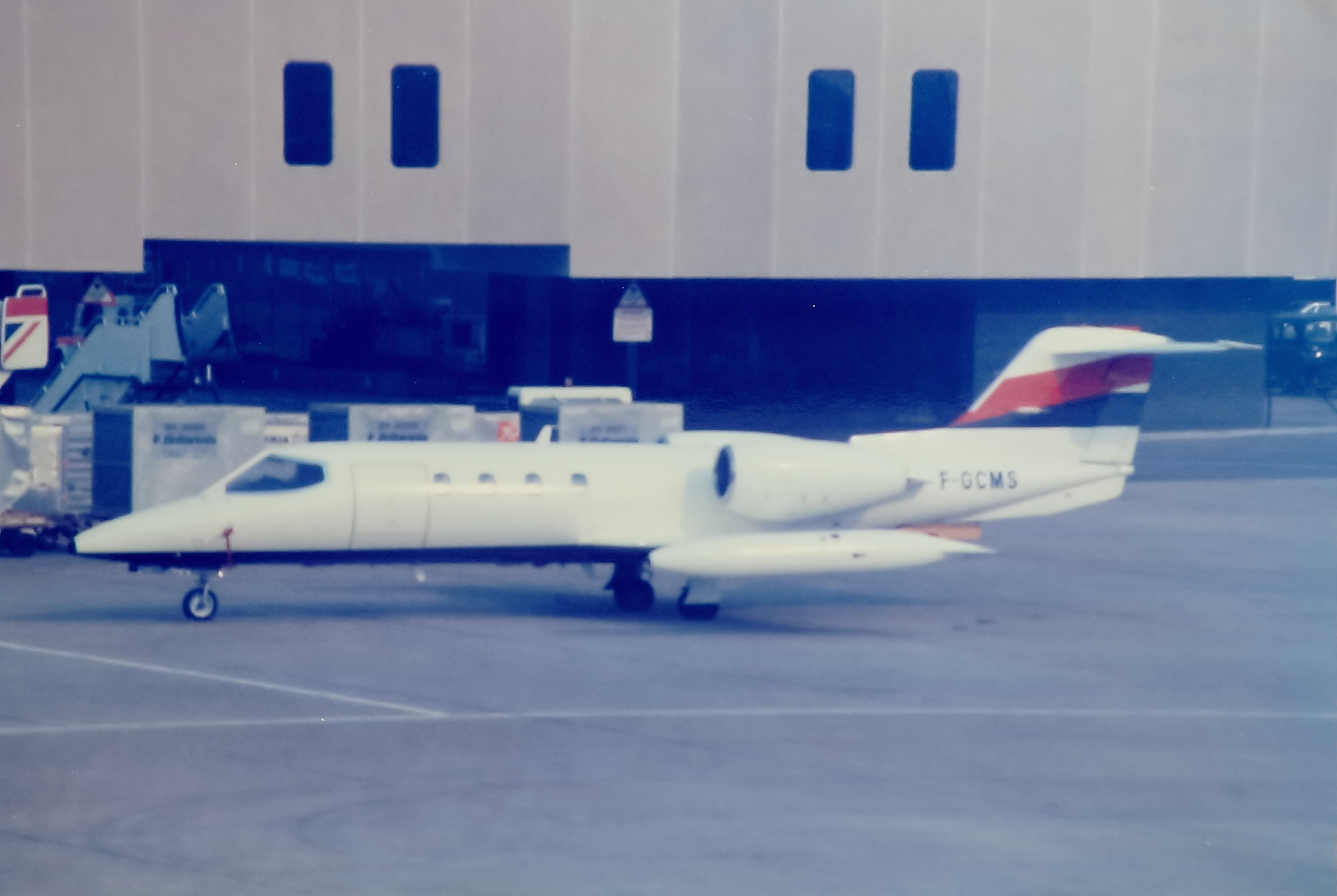
Learjet 35A

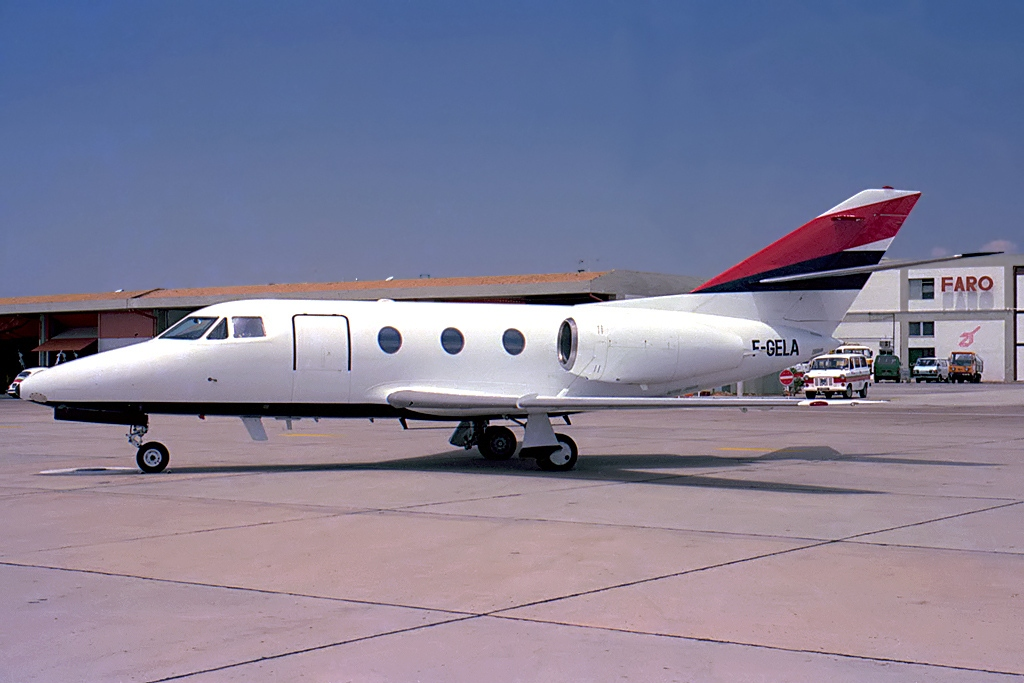
Dassault Falcon 10

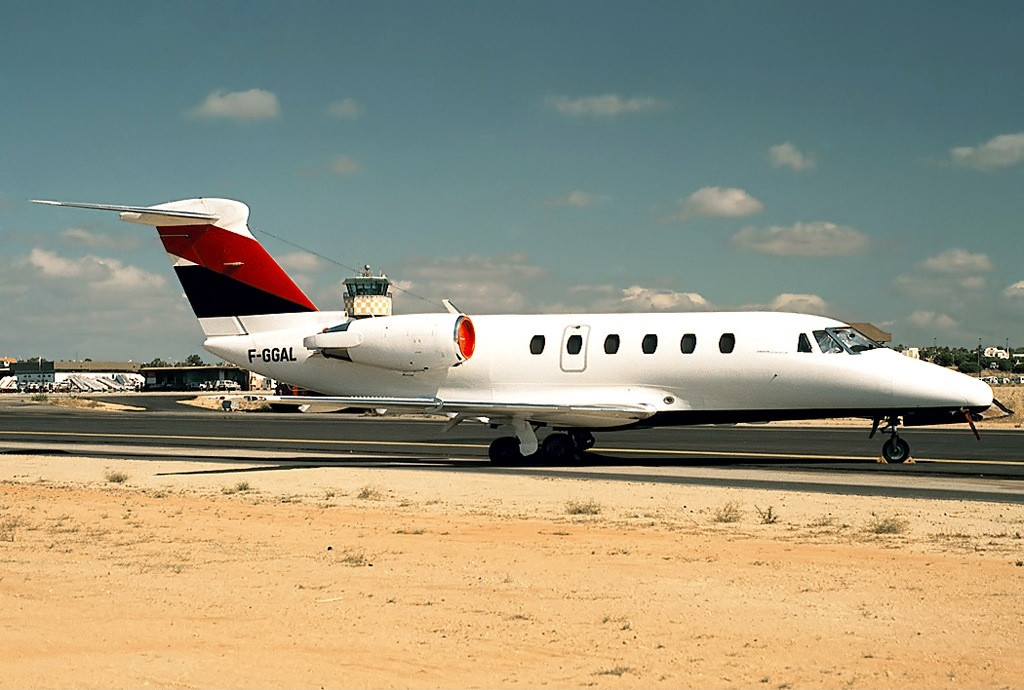
Cessna 650 Citation III
