= Bouguenais =

Bouguenais Bógonaè/Boug·naï (Gallo) Kervegon (Breton)
- Commune
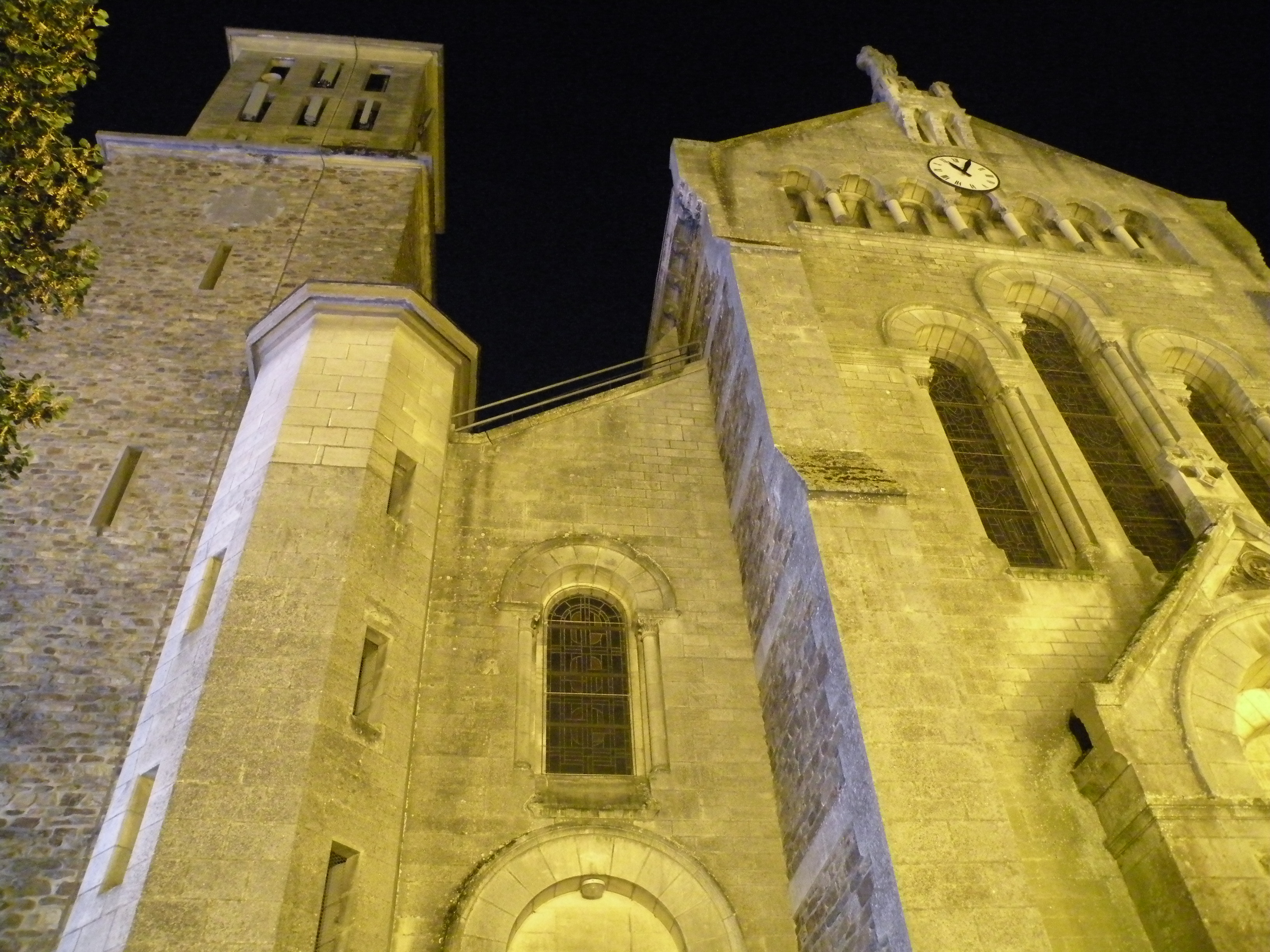

- Coat of arms
- Location of Bouguenais
- Location within France Location within Pays de la Loire
- Coordinates: 47°10′48″N 1°37′25″W
- Country: France
- Region: Pays de la Loire
- Department: Loire-Atlantique
- Arrondissement: Nantes
- Canton: Rezé-1
- Intercommunality: Nantes Métropole

Government
  - Mayor (2020–2026): Sandra Impériale
- Area^{1}: 31.50 km^{2} (12.16 sq mi)
- Elevation: 28 m (92 ft)
- Highest elevation: 41 m (135 ft)
- Lowest elevation: 1 m (3.3 ft)
- Population (2023): 20,530
  - Density: 651.7/km^{2} (1,688/sq mi)
- Time zone: UTC+01:00 (CET)
  - Summer (DST): UTC+02:00 (CEST)
- INSEE/Postal code: 44020 /44340
- Dialling codes: 02
- ^{1} French Land Register data, which excludes lakes, ponds, glaciers > 1 km^{2} (0.386 sq mi or 247 acres) and river estuaries.

Bouguenais (French pronunciation: [buɡnɛ]; Gallo: Bógonaè or Boug·naï, Breton: Kervegon) is a commune in the Loire-Atlantique department in western France near Nantes.

Bouguenais is home to the Nantes Atlantique Airport.

== Population ==
Historical population

Year	Pop.	±% p.a.
1793	2,790	—
1800	2,376	−2.27%
1806	2,710	+2.22%
1821	3,165	+1.04%
1831	3,287	+0.38%
1841	3,281	−0.02%
1846	3,360	+0.48%
1851	3,413	+0.31%
1856	3,637	+1.28%
1861	3,877	+1.29%
1866	3,729	−0.78%
1872	3,709	−0.09%
1876	3,642	−0.45%
1881	3,599	−0.24%
1886	3,768	+0.92%
1891	3,897	+0.68%
1896	3,761	−0.71%
1901	3,865	+0.55%

Year	Pop.	±% p.a.
1906	3,826	−0.20%
1911	3,796	−0.16%
1921	3,897	+0.26%
1926	3,784	−0.59%
1931	4,158	+1.90%
1936	4,162	+0.02%
1946	4,810	+1.46%
1954	6,523	+3.88%
1962	8,777	+3.78%
1968	10,047	+2.28%
1975	11,684	+2.18%
1982	14,043	+2.66%
1990	15,099	+0.91%
1999	15,627	+0.38%
2007	16,698	+0.83%
2012	18,382	+1.94%
2017	19,331	+1.01%
2023	20,530	+1.01%

Source: EHESS and INSEE (1968-2023)

== Economy ==
The head office of Régional in 2010, head office of Air France Hop since 2013.

Régional, a regional airline, was headquartered on the grounds of Nantes Atlantique Airport.

Régional was formed on 30 March 2001 with the merger of Regional Airlines, Flandre Air, and Proteus Airlines. Before the formation of Régional, Regional Airlines had its headquarters on the grounds of the airport. Regional Airlines was the largest of the three companies that were merged into the new Régional. In 2013 the airline merged into HOP!, itself rebranded in 2019 as Air France Hop, which is still based at Nantes Atlantique Airport.

== Mayors ==
List of the mayors of Bouguenais since 1900.

- 2020- : Sandra Impériale
- 2014-2020: Martine Le Jeune
- 2007-2014: Michèle Gressus
- 1993-2007: Françoise Verchère (resigned in September 2007)
- 1971-1993: François Autain
- 1947-1971: Henri Robichon
- 1945-1947: Alexandre Gendron
- 1944-1945: Georges Gaborieau
- 1941-1944: Élie Leaute
- 1940-1941: Joseph Bureau
- 1912-1925: Louis Moreau
- 1900-1912: Sébastien Guérin

== Education ==
Primary schools in the commune include:

- Preschools (écoles maternelles):
  - Bourg: Maternelle Chateaubriand, Ecole Jean Zay, École de la Croix-Jeannette
  - Couëts: Maternelle Françoise Dolto, Maternelle Célestin Freinet, Maternelle Fougan de Mer
- Elementary schools:
  - Bourg: Élémentaire Chateaubriand, Ecole Jean Zay, École de la Croix-Jeannette
  - Couëts: Élémentaire Urbain le Verrier, Élémentaire Fougan de Mer
- There is a private school group, Groupe Saint-Pierre (formerly Groupe Notre-Dame Saint-Pierre), with École Saint-Pierre.

There is one public junior high school, Collège et SEGPA de la Neustrie, one public high school, Lycée Professionnel Pablo Neruda, and a private alternative school, Lycée Professionnel Hôtelier Privé Daniel Brottier (the private high school is for children with academic, social, and family troubles).

== See also ==
- Communes of the Loire-Atlantique department
- Port Lavigne
