= Regional Airlines (France) =

French regional airline (1992–2013)

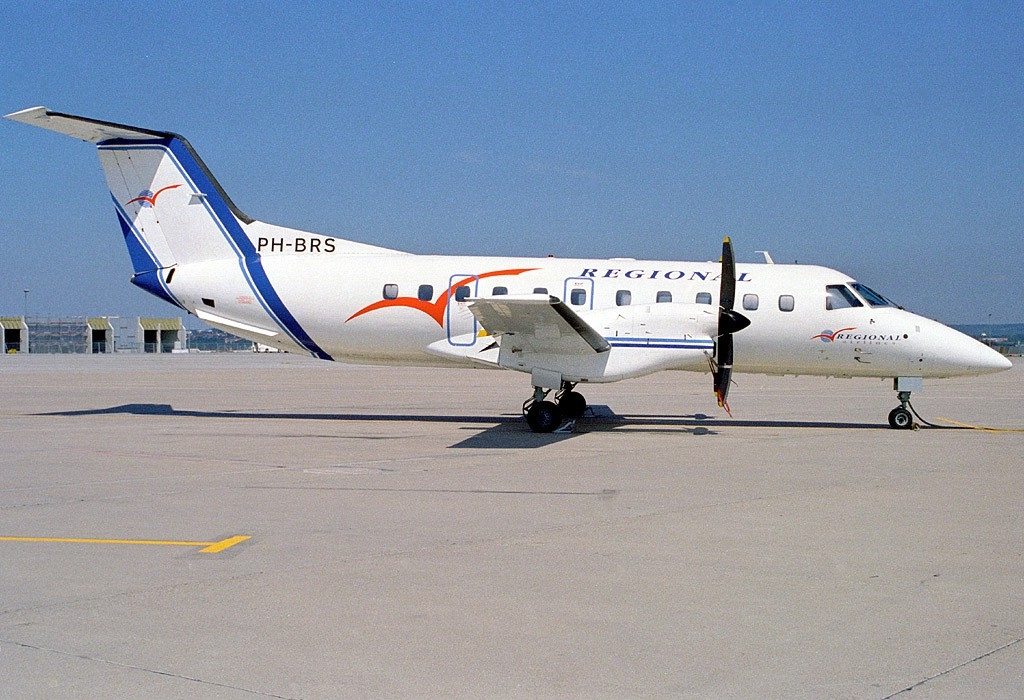
- Embraer EMB-120 Brasilia
IATA	ICAO	Call sign
VM	RGI	REGIONAL
- Founded: 1 January 1992 (amalgamation)
- Ceased operations: 30 March 2001 (merged with Flandre Air and Proteus Airlines to form Régional)
- Operating bases: Bordeaux; Clermont-Ferrand; Le Havre; Nantes
- Fleet size: See Fleet below
- Destinations: See Destinations below
- Headquarters: Nantes, France

Regional Airlines S.A. was a French regional airline headquartered at Nantes Atlantique Airport, in Bouguenais, Loire-Atlantique department, France.

== History ==
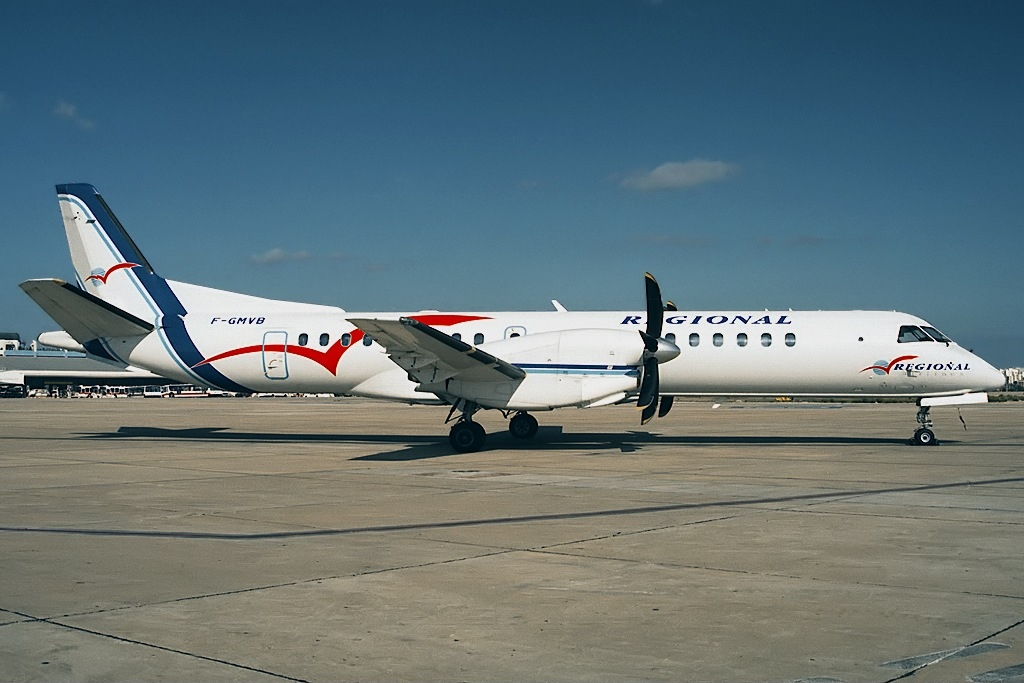
Saab 2000.

The airline was formed on 1 January 1992 by the merger of Air Exel, Air Vendée and Avions Taxis Pyrénéens regional airlines, and scheduled operations operated by Air Aquitaine Transport aviation company. At the beginning the airline was legally a subsidiary of Air Vendée (79% shareholding) but after a few years majority ownership was taken over by Air France.

On 30 March 2001 Regional Airlines, Flandre Air, and Proteus Airlines merged their operations. In September of that same year Regional Airlines changed the corporate name to Régional Compagnie Aérienne Européenne and just Régional marketing and trading name was adopted.

On 31 March 2013 all operations were branded HOP!, an Air France-linked trademark. In March 2017 HOP! became a fully registered air carrier, always working in close connection with Air France.

== Fleet ==
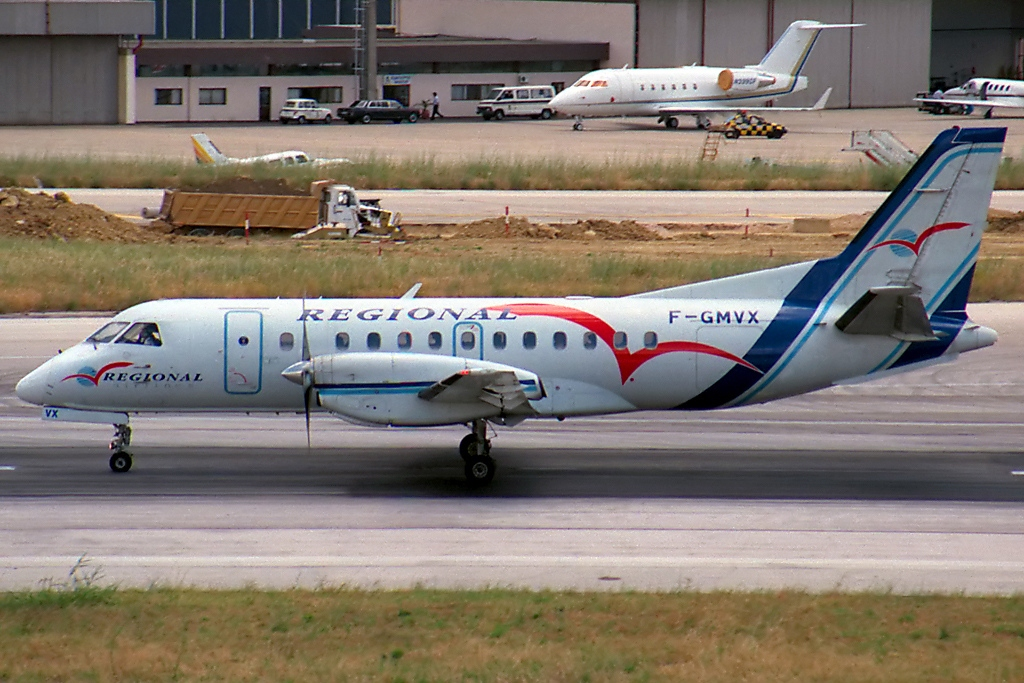
Saab 340B

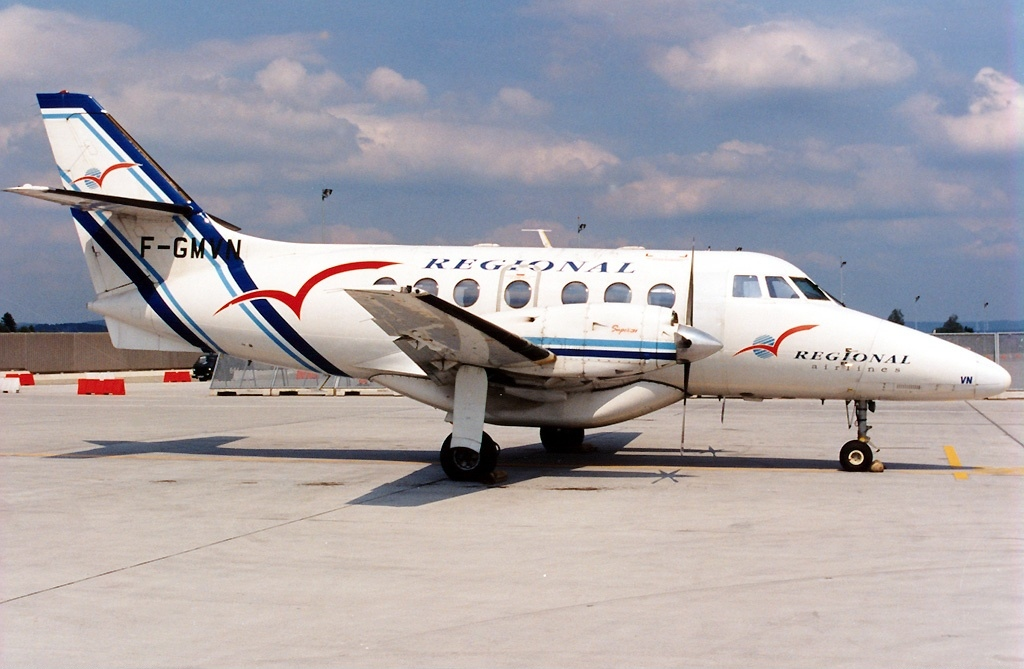
BAe Jetstream 31

In early years the fleet included the following aircraft types, all inherited from the founding airlines:

- BAe Jetstream 31
- Fairchild Metroliner II
- Fairchild Metroliner III
- Saab 340

At the beginning of 2001 the fleet included the following aircraft types:

- 1 Embraer EMB-120 Brasilia
- 6 Embraer EMB-120 Brasilia Advanced
- 4 Embraer ERJ 135
- 12 Embraer ERJ-145
- 10 Saab 2000

== Destinations ==
International

Amsterdam, Barcelona, Bilbao, Copenhagen, Geneva, Lisbon, London, Madrid, Milan, Porto, Turin

Domestic

Ajaccio, Angers, Angouleme, Brest, Biarritz, Bordeaux, Bourges, Clermont-Ferrand, Caen, Dijon, Basle, Le Havre, Lille, La Rochelle, Lyon, Montpellier, Marseille, Nice, Nantes, Rennes, Strasbourg, Toulon, Toulouse

== See also ==
- Cygnus Air
