= Flandre Air =

Regional airline of France (1977–2001)

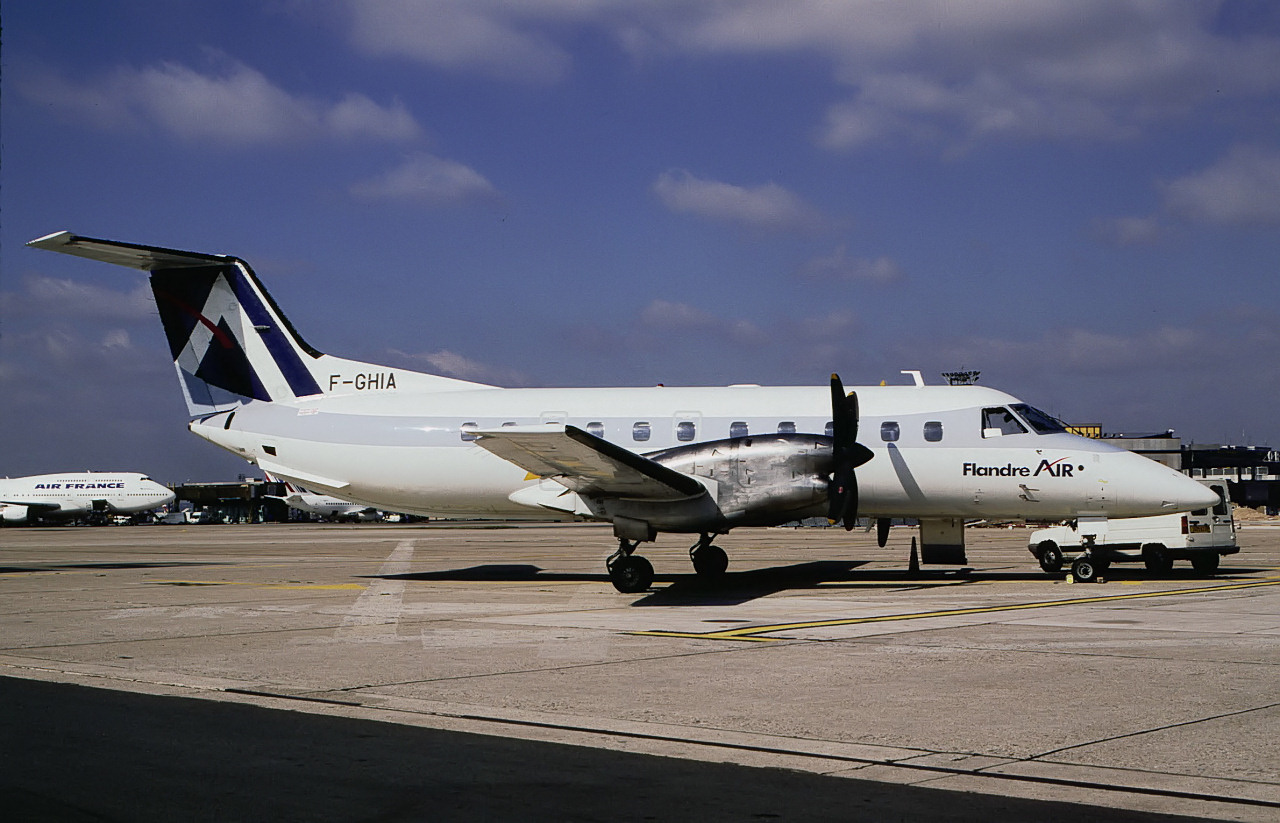
- Embraer EMB-120 Brasilia
IATA	ICAO	Call sign
IX	FRS	FLANDRAIR
- Founded: 1977
- Ceased operations: 30 March 2001 (merged with Proteus Airlines and Regional Airlines to form Régional)
- Operating bases: Lille Airport
- Headquarters: Lesquin, France

Flandre Air was a French regional airline headquartered at Lille Airport in Lesquin, France, near Lille.

== History ==
The airline began as a charter airline in 1977. It began scheduled services in 1985. In October 1997 Flandre Air became the European launch customer of the Embraer RJ-135. In November 1998 Flandre Air signed a franchise agreement with Air Liberté, which began in January 1999. In October 1999 Proteus Airlines acquired Flandre Air. On 30 March 2001 Flandre, Proteus, and Regional Airlines merged into Régional, which itself merged into HOP! in 2013.

== Fleet ==
- 13 – Beech 1900
- 9 – Embraer Brasilia
- 1 – Beech King Air
