= Régional =

French airline, 2001–2017

Régional Compagnie Aérienne Européenne

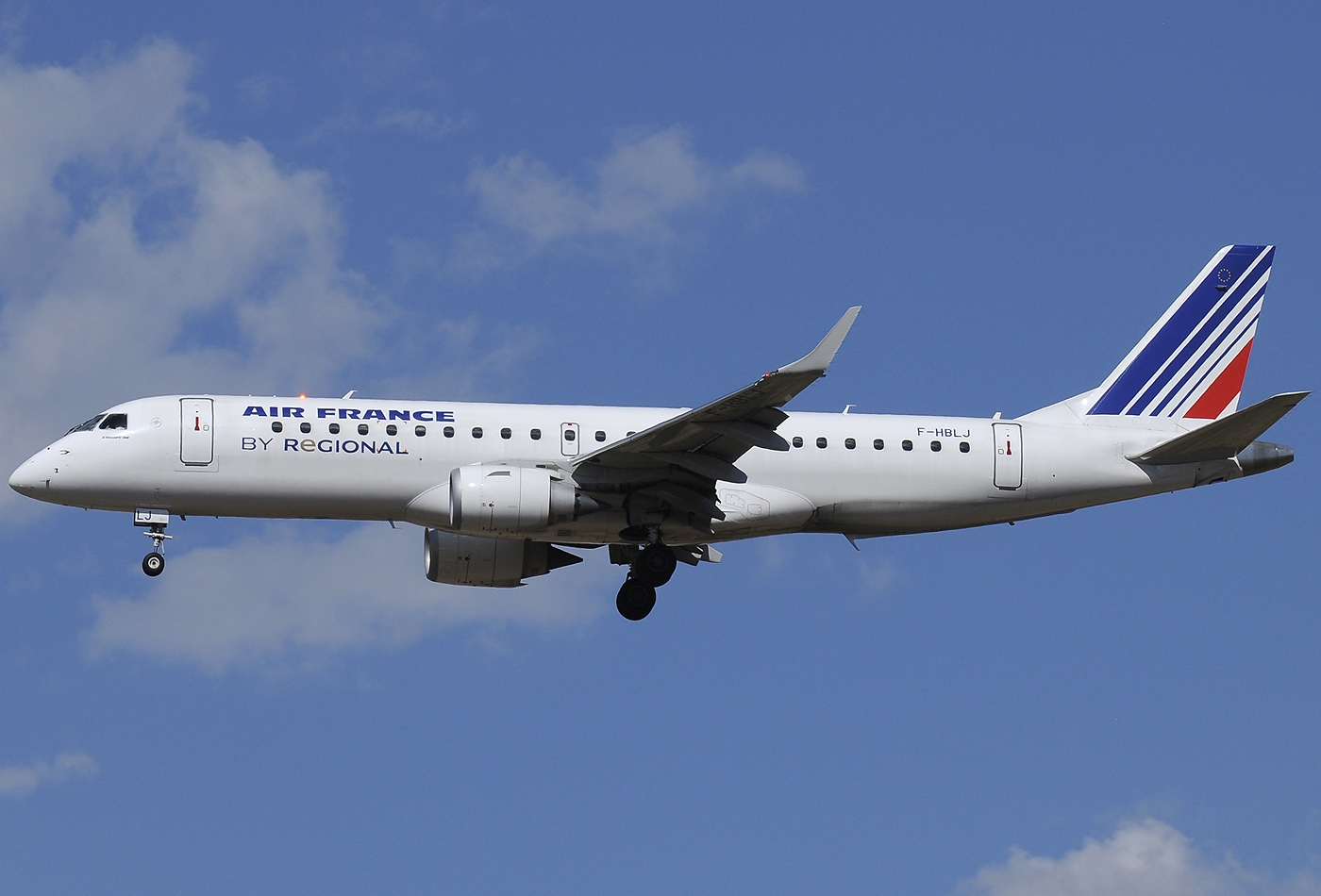
- A Régional Embraer E190
IATA	ICAO	Call sign
YS	RAE	REGIONAL EUROPE
- Founded: September 2001
- Ceased operations: March 2017 (merged into Air France Hop)
- Hubs: Nantes Atlantique Airport
- Frequent-flyer program: Flying Blue
- Alliance: SkyTeam (affiliate)
- Fleet size: 44
- Destinations: 38
- Parent company: Air France-KLM
- Headquarters: Nantes Atlantique Airport, Bouguenais, France
- Website: uk.regional.com

Régional Compagnie Aérienne Européenne, commonly known as Régional, was an airline wholly owned by Air France which linked Paris and Lyon hubs to 49 airports in Europe. It was headquartered at Nantes Atlantique Airport in Loire-Atlantique administrative department.

== History ==
The airline had been formed as Regional Airlines on 1 January 1992 by the merger of Air Exel, Air Vendée and Avions Taxis Pyrénéens regional airlines and scheduled operations operated by Air Aquitaine Transport aviation company.

On 30 March 2001 Regional Airlines, Flandre Air, and Proteus Airlines merged their operations. In September of that same year, Regional Airlines changed its corporate name to Régional Compagnie Aérienne Européenne and the Régional marketing and trading name was adopted.

During 2006, the airline was upgrading and consolidating its fleet, considering allying with a partner with turboprop aircraft only as it increasingly turned its attention to operations with jetliners. The two remaining Saab 2000s were phased out in 2006, and the last of its nine Embraer EMB-120s followed in 2008. It became the first European operator of the Embraer E190 aircraft in November 2006.

On 31 March 2013, all operations were rebranded HOP!, an Air France-linked trademark. In March 2017, after a year of negotiations with Brit Air and Airlinair, HOP! became a fully registered air carrier, always working in close connection with Air France.

== Fleet ==
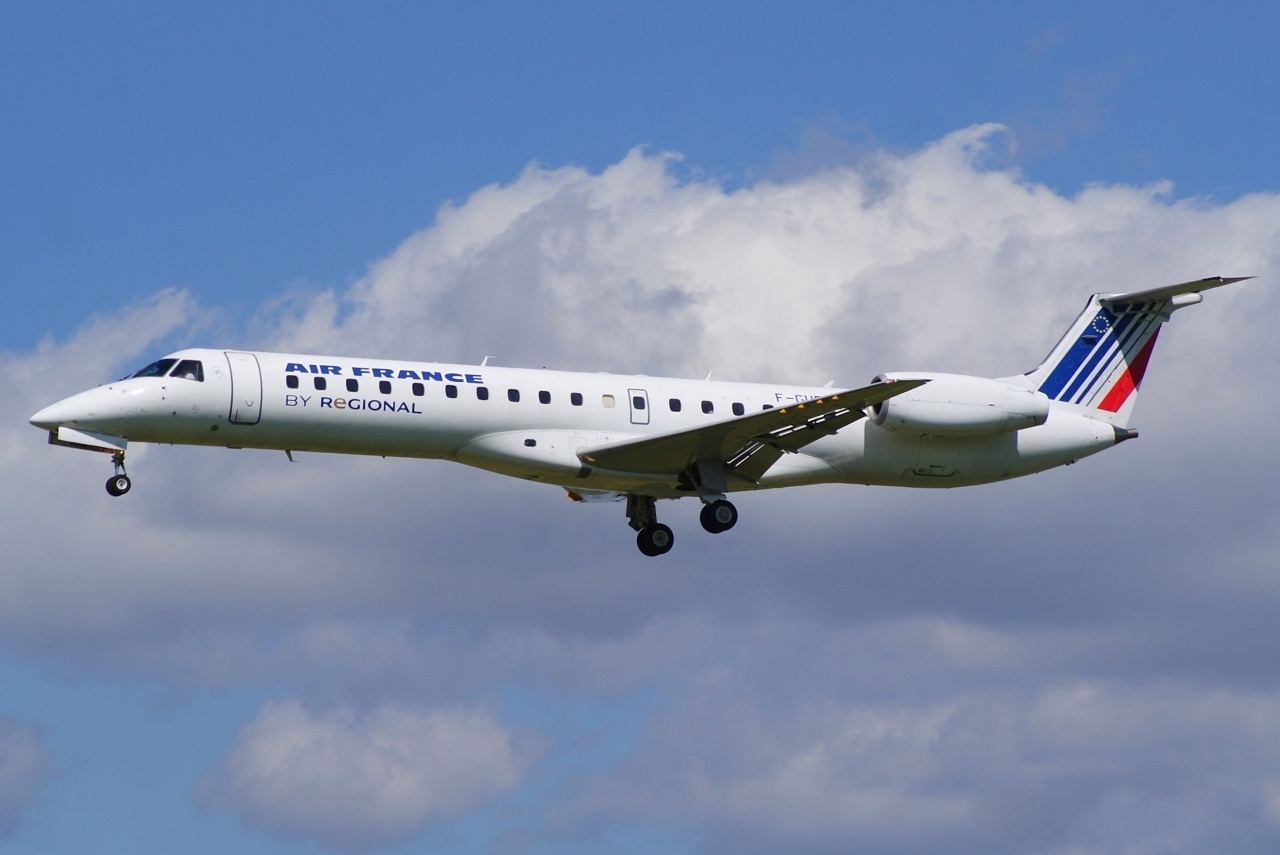
A Régional ERJ-145

Régional became the first European operator of the Embraer E190 on 23 November 2006, when the first of six was delivered. The 100-seat jetliner would operate domestic and intra-European services in Air France colours. The E190s were part of an order from the Air France-KLM Group together with another 18 in option. The air carrier received the first Embraer E170 of 6 ordered on September 2, 2008; this jetliner showed the new airline logo. The last propeller aircraft, the Embraer EMB 120 left the fleet on October 10, 2008, replaced by the ERJ-135.

In March 2013 the fleet included the following aircraft.

Aircraft	In service	Orders	Passengers
Embraer ERJ-135	1	0	37
Embraer ERJ-145	17	0	50
Embraer E170	16	0	76
Embraer E190	10	0	100
Total	44	0	

== Head office ==
The head office of the airline at Nantes Atlantique Airport in Bouguenais

The head office of the airline was located on the grounds of Nantes Atlantique Airport in Bouguenais, near Nantes. The head office was adjacent to the airport hotels. Nantes Atlantique Airport bore the head office of Regional Airlines, the largest of the three airlines that merged into Régional.

== Incidents and accidents ==
- On 25 January 2007, Régional Flight 7775 from Pau to Paris, operated by Régional, crashed shortly after take-off. All 54 passengers and crew escaped from the Fokker 100 although a truck driver was killed on the ground. An investigation by the BEA revealed that the cause of the accident was ice on the wings of the aircraft involved.
