= Proteus Airlines =

Regional airline of France (1986–2001)

IATA	ICAO	Call sign
YS	PRB	PROTEUS
- Founded: 1986(as Proteus Air System)
- Commenced operations: May 1996 (as Proteus Airlines)
- Ceased operations: 30 March 2001 (merged with Flandre Air and Regional Airlines to form Régional)
- Parent company: Air France
- Headquarters: Saint-Apollinaire, Côte-d'Or, France

Proteus Airlines was a French regional airline with its head offices in Saint-Apollinaire, Côte-d'Or, France, near Dijon, and in Saint-Étienne. Founded in 1986, it remained operational until its merger into Régional in 2001.

== History ==
The airline was originally established in 1986 as Proteus Air System. In May 1996, it began scheduled services under its new name Proteus Airlines. In 1997 the airline acquired a regional airline, Air Transport Pyrénées and its fleet of Beech 1900 and Beech King Air, while in August signed a franchise agreement with Air France. In October 1999 Proteus acquired another regional airline, Flandre Air. On 30 March 2001, Proteus, Flandre, and Regional Airlines merged into Régional, itself merged into HOP! in 2013. In 1996, the airline transported 50,000 passengers.

== Incidents and accidents ==
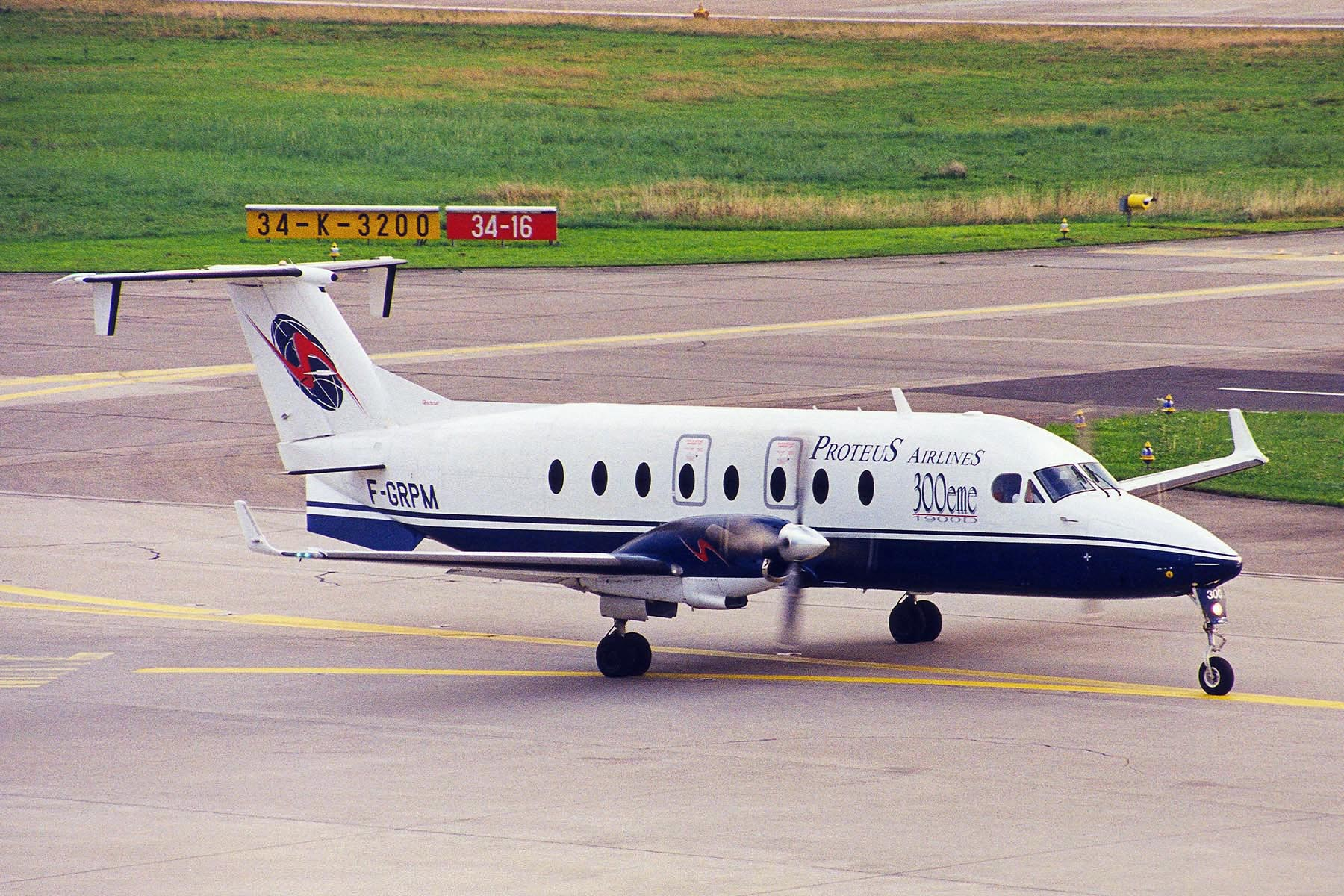
A Proteus Airlines Beechcraft 1900D, similar to the aircraft involved in the accident

On 30 July 1998, a Beechcraft 1900D, operating as Proteus Airlines Flight 706 from Lyon to Lorient in Brittany, was hit by a privately owned Cessna 177RG over Quiberon Bay, killing all 15 people on board both aircraft. The biggest contributing factor to the accident was the crew of the 1900D electing to take a detour to fly around the SS Norway. While finishing the sightseeing pass over the ship and shifting their attention to landing preparations, the crew did not use the see and avoid concept that was part of the visual flight rules they were operating under. In addition, the pilot of the Cessna had neglected to turn on his plane's transponder, effectively making the aircraft invisible to radar systems on the ground.
