= Port Lavigne =

French village

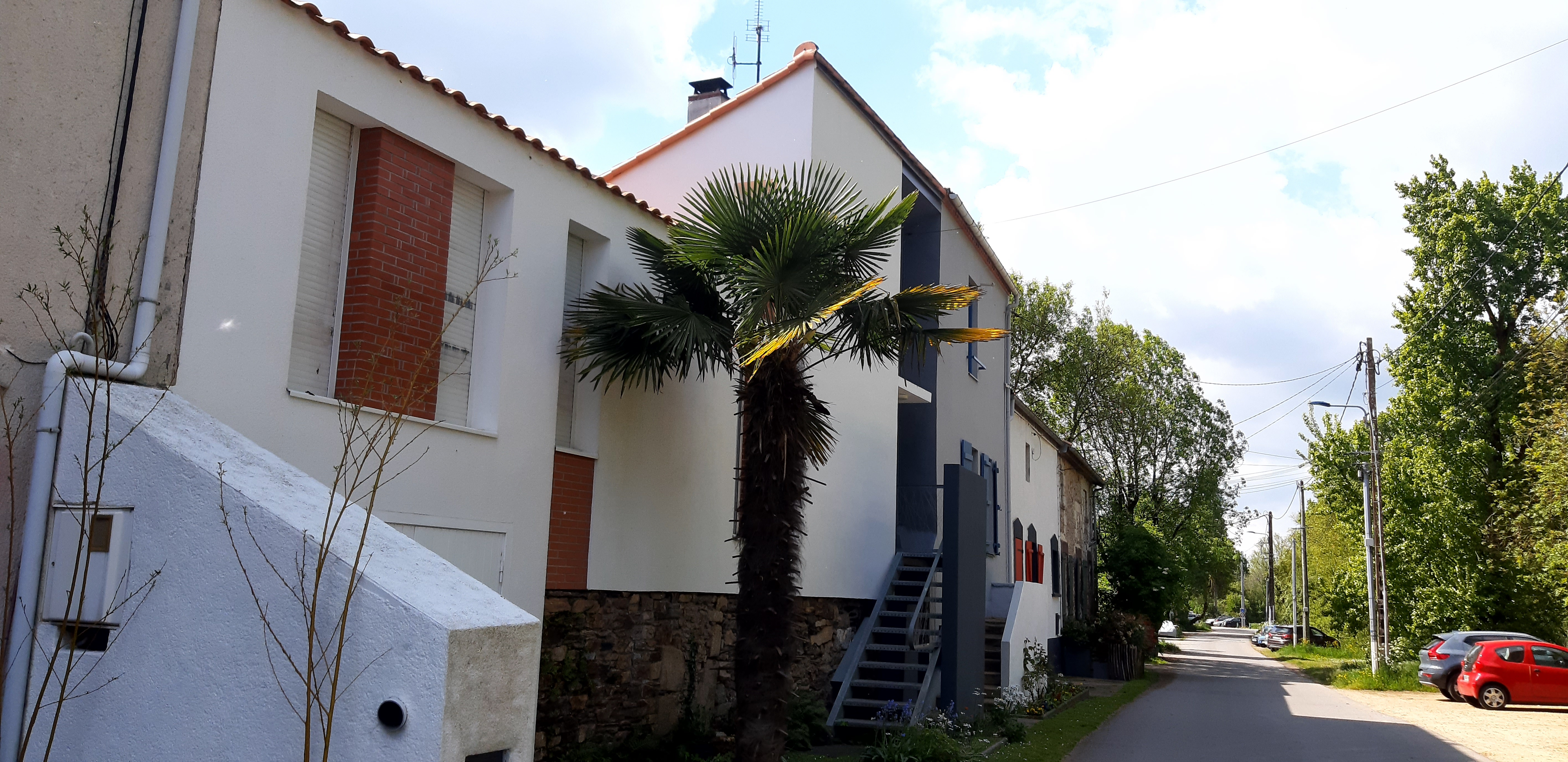
- Port Lavigne, Fishermen's Street
- Interactive map of Port Lavigne
- Country: France
- Region: Pays de la Loire
- Department: Loire-Atlantique
- Commune: Bouguenais

Port Lavigne, also known as Le Port Lavigne, is a village located in the commune of Bouguenais, in the Loire-Atlantique department of France.

== Overview ==
The village of Port Lavigne is located on a rocky shoal at the confluence of a former branch of the Loire River, now the Bouguenais channel (étier), and the Loire estuary, on the left bank of the river downstream from Nantes. The village consists of houses arranged linearly along a single street, built on elevated ground to protect against flooding. It faces the Cheviré terminal of the Port of Nantes and overlooks approximately 225 hectares of wet meadows and reed beds situated between the Loire and an adjacent hillside. Formerly threatened by the expansion of the Grand Port Maritime of Nantes–Saint-Nazaire, which owns much of the surrounding land, Port Lavigne now functions as an agropastoral enclave. It includes a dry dock and a hiking trail connecting it to the Île de la Fourche and La Roche Ballue. The area also serves as a conservation site for various plant species, including the estuarine angelica (Angelica heterocarpa).

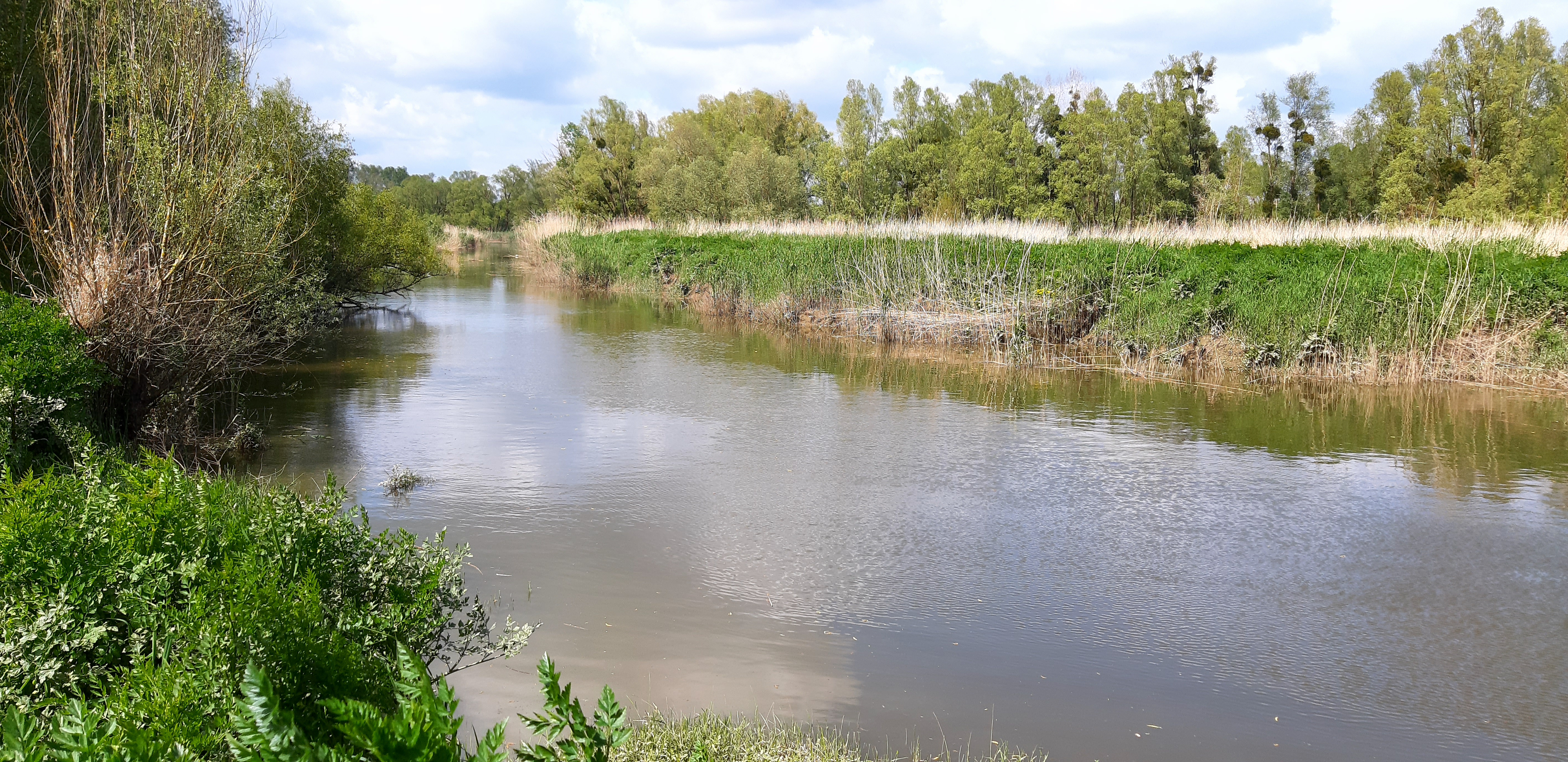
Bouguenais sluice gate

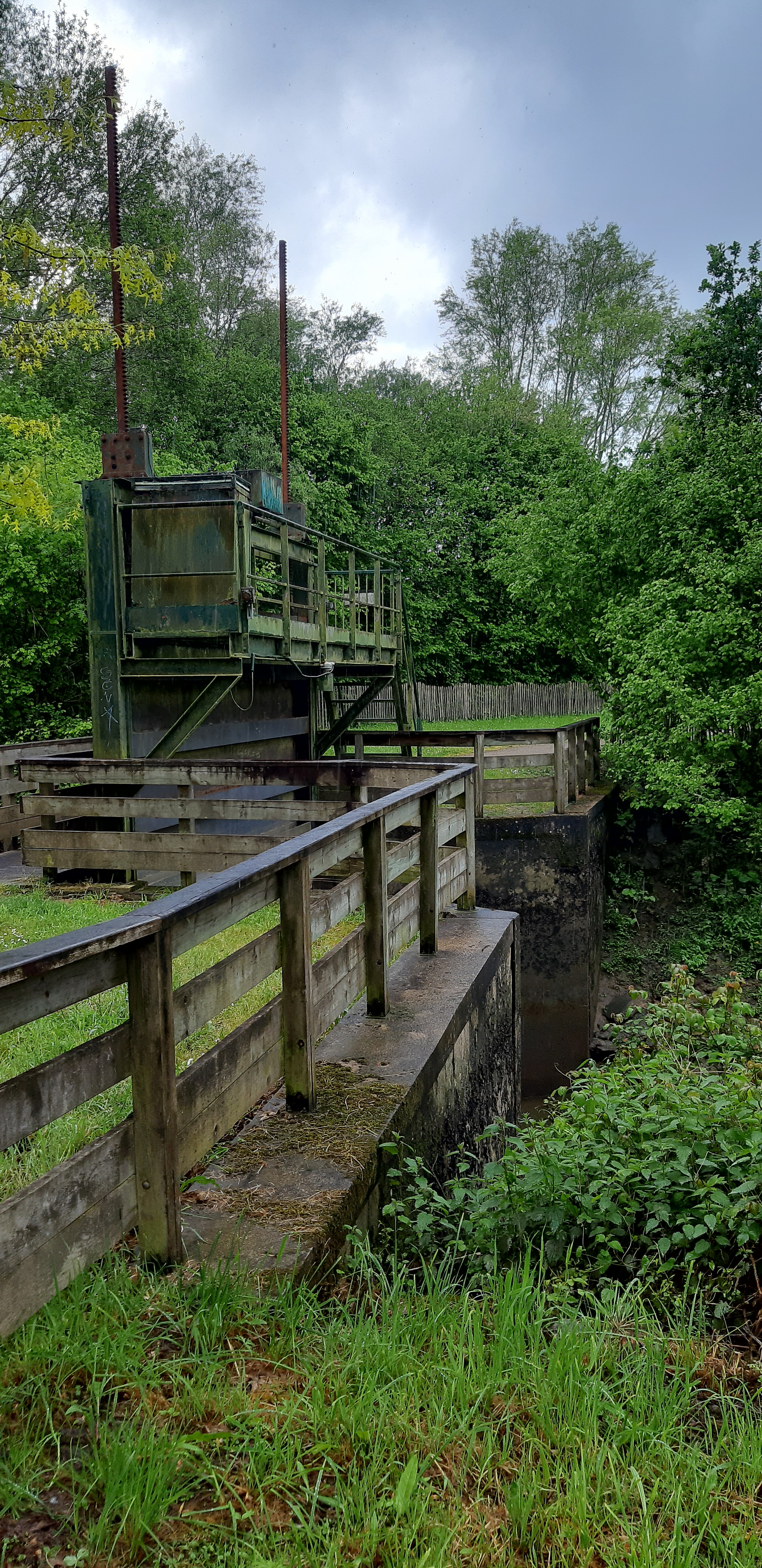
Discharge valve

=== History ===
==== Development ====
Regulation of the Loire River began in the late 18th century to facilitate navigation and improve access for merchant vessels to the port of Nantes. At the time, the river was divided into multiple branches, known as boires, separated by islands and sandbanks. Its irregular flow often left parts of the riverbed nearly dry during summer, hindering navigation. (Note: The digging of the Martinière Canal was intended to solve the navigation problems of the Loire River.) The engineering works aimed to concentrate the river’s flow into a single navigable channel. Secondary branches on the left bank were dammed and gradually filled in, leading to the merging of islands, while groynes were constructed on the right bank to slow the current and narrow the main channel.

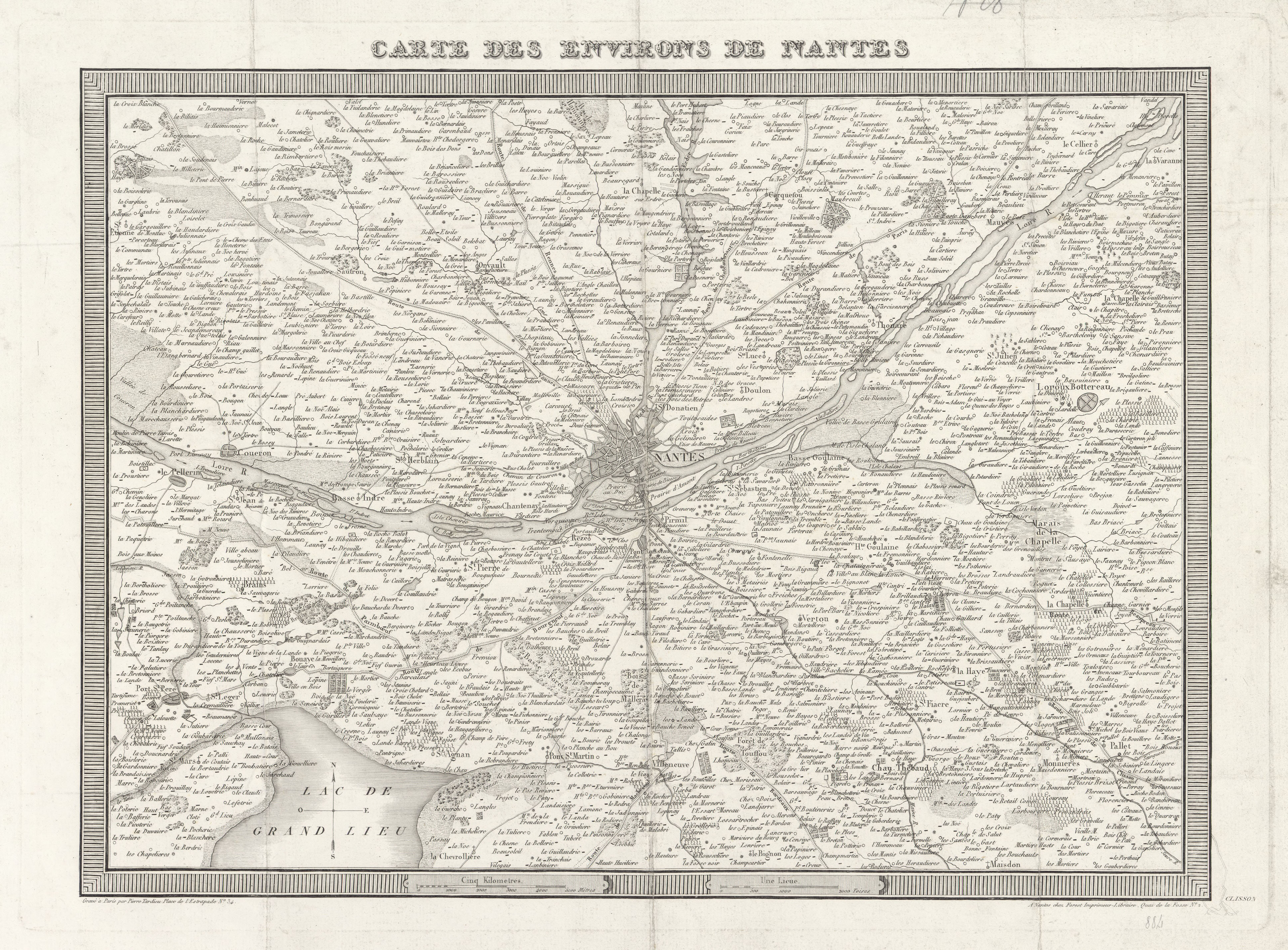
“Port de la Vigne” appearing on the Carte des environs de Nantes, by Pierre Tardieu (1828)

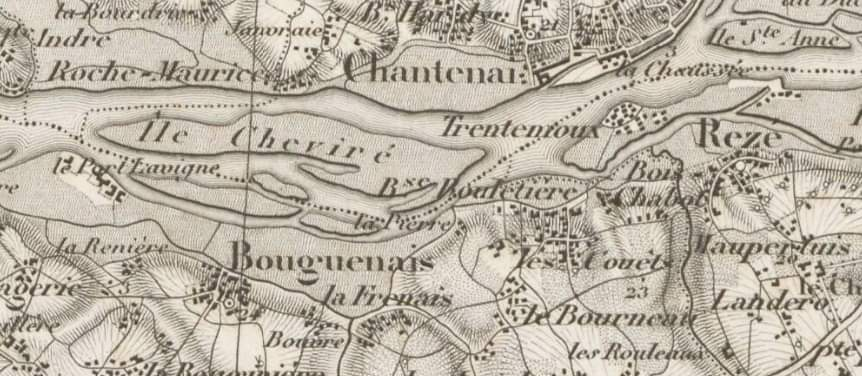
Port Lavigne depicted on an excerpt from the map Nantes et les Îles de la Loire (1850)

Until the early 20th century, the Loire River bordered the present-day Rue des Pêcheurs. The village was subject to tidal rhythms, and flooding of the Loire periodically isolated it, temporarily turning it into an island. Supplies were then delivered by boat directly to doorsteps, which functioned as small landing stages. The original Port Lavigne dike was later reinforced with an embankment composed of dredging materials from the Loire, slag from the Couëron foundry, and debris from the demolition of the old Bouguenais parish church bell tower. These modifications lowered the river’s level, and a flood similar to that of December 1872 would no longer submerge Rue des Pêcheurs.

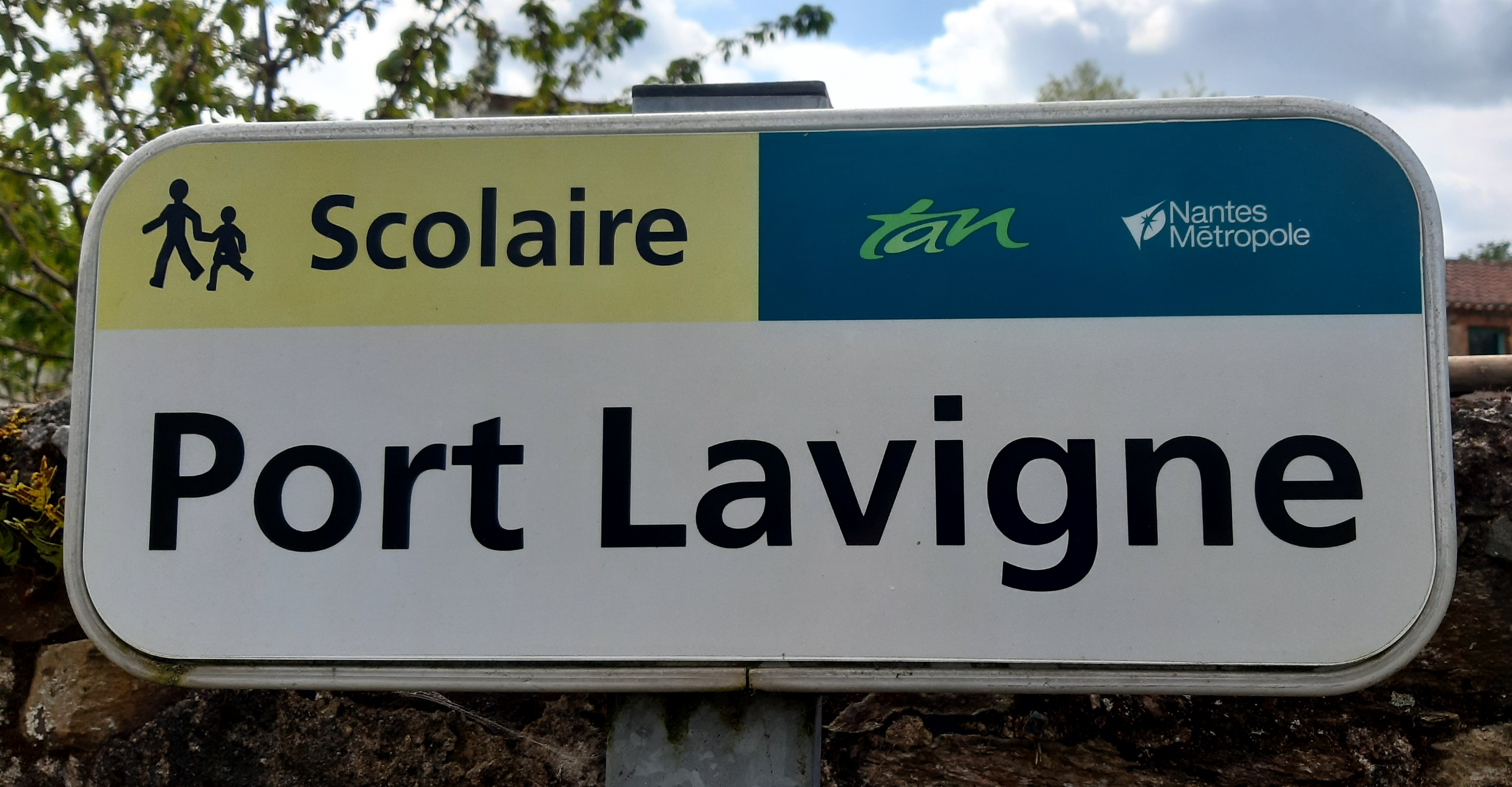
School bus sign in Port Lavigne

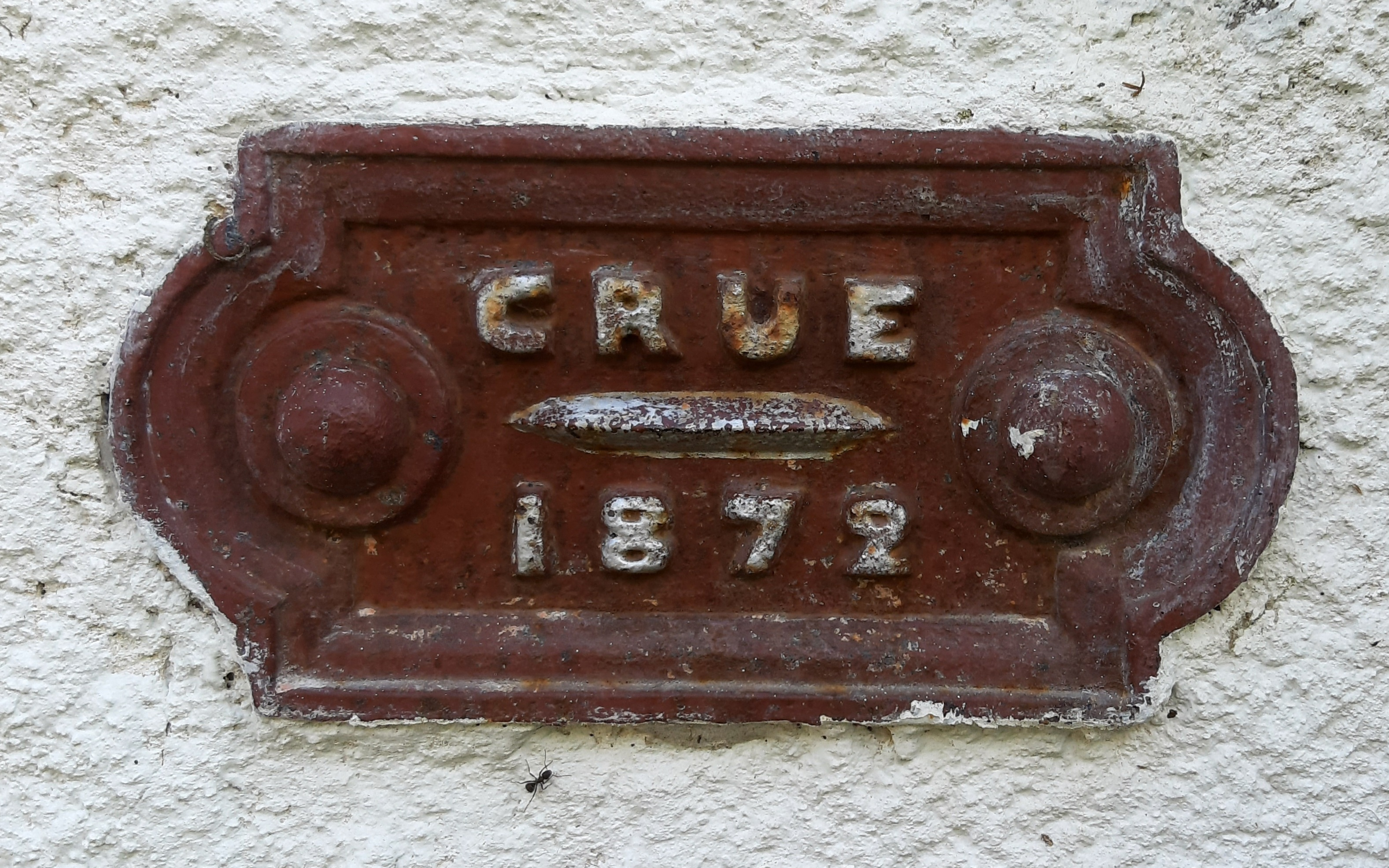
Plaque commemorating the flood of December 1872, at 40 Rue des Pêcheurs

==== Port trade ====
Port Lavigne was historically a trading port on the Loire River. From the 17th to the late 19th century, it supported commercial activity linked to the port of Nantes. Local products, including Loire wines from nearby vineyards, bricks from Chauvé, and livestock and forage from the meadows of Buzay in the Pays de Retz, were shipped from the site. Other goods such as lime and timber from Montjean in Maine-et-Loire, as well as reeds, sand, and salt from the Bay of Bourgneuf, were also traded along its quays. The merchandise was transported by barges and chalands for regional commerce, while larger vessels carried wine abroad, particularly to the Netherlands, where it was known as Nantez eau de vie. Currently, port activity has shifted to the nearby Cheviré port area, which handles the transport of wood, sand, and scrap metal.

==== Fishing ====
Port Lavigne was historically a fishing village, with seine fishing serving as the main source of livelihood until the First World War. Five families—the Cormerais, Rincé, Paul David, Mocquard, and Levêque families—were primarily involved in this activity. Seine fishing consisted of collectively drawing a net across the shore to trap fish and was practiced on the beaches of the former islands of Cheviré and Botty, facing the village. The activity was seasonal, targeting sea trout from November to March, shad until May, and other species such as lamprey later in the year. Fishing followed the rhythm of the tides, with techniques adapted to the six-hour tidal cycle and the species caught, while water levels, fish size, and migration periods determined the duration of fishing sessions. Nowadays, fishing at Port Lavigne is primarily recreational, with carrelet fishing from stilt-mounted huts (pêcheries) along the old dike on the banks of the Bouguenais channel. The brackish waters support both saltwater species, including thick-lipped grey mullet, flounder, Atlantic salmon, allis shad, twaite shad, and sea lamprey, and freshwater species such as perch, pumpkinseed, wels catfish, pikeperch, common bream, river lamprey, brown bullhead, gudgeon, northern pike, common carp, chub, common barbel, common roach, European eel, and glass eel.

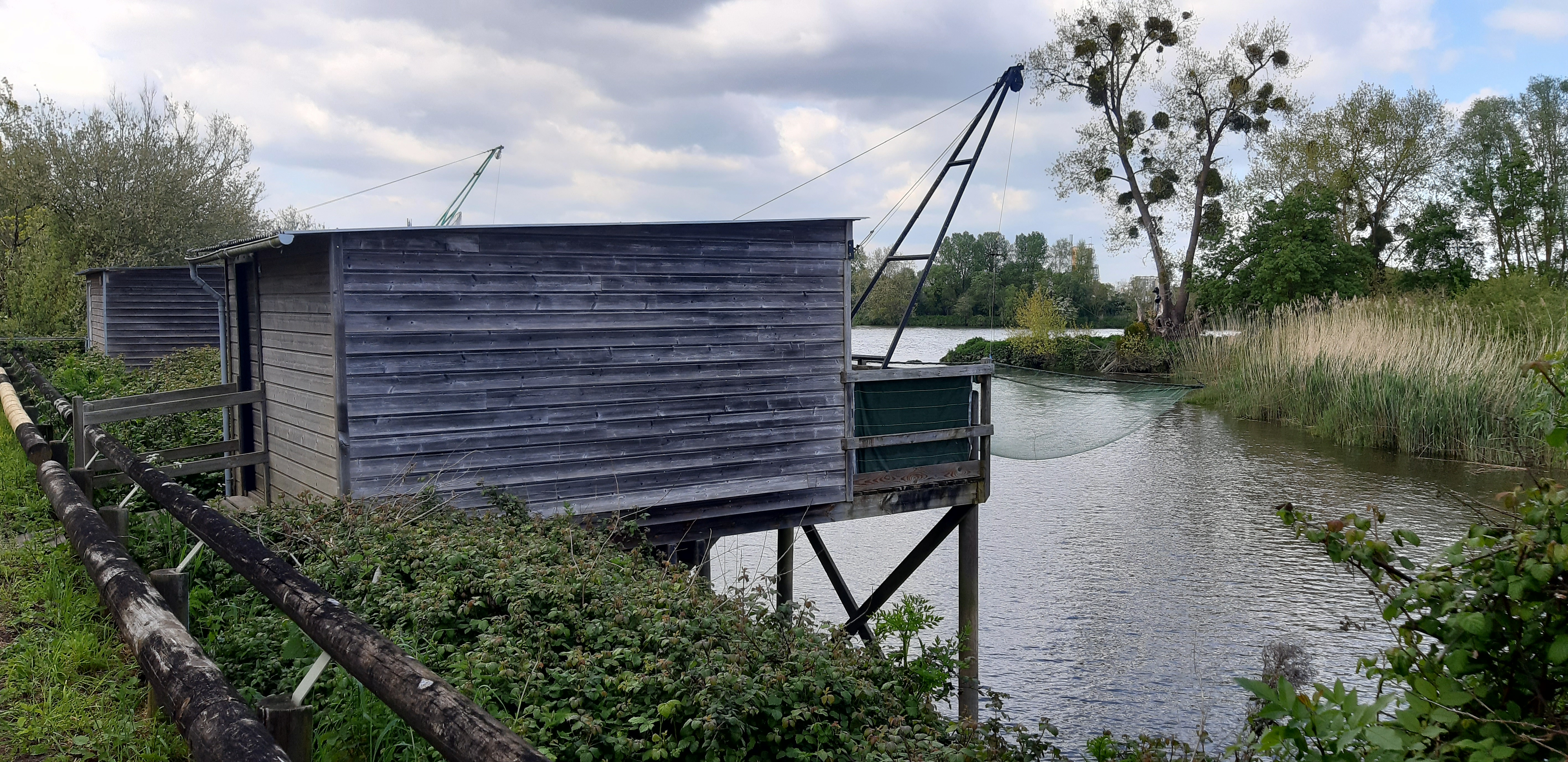
Fishing on the Bouguenais canal

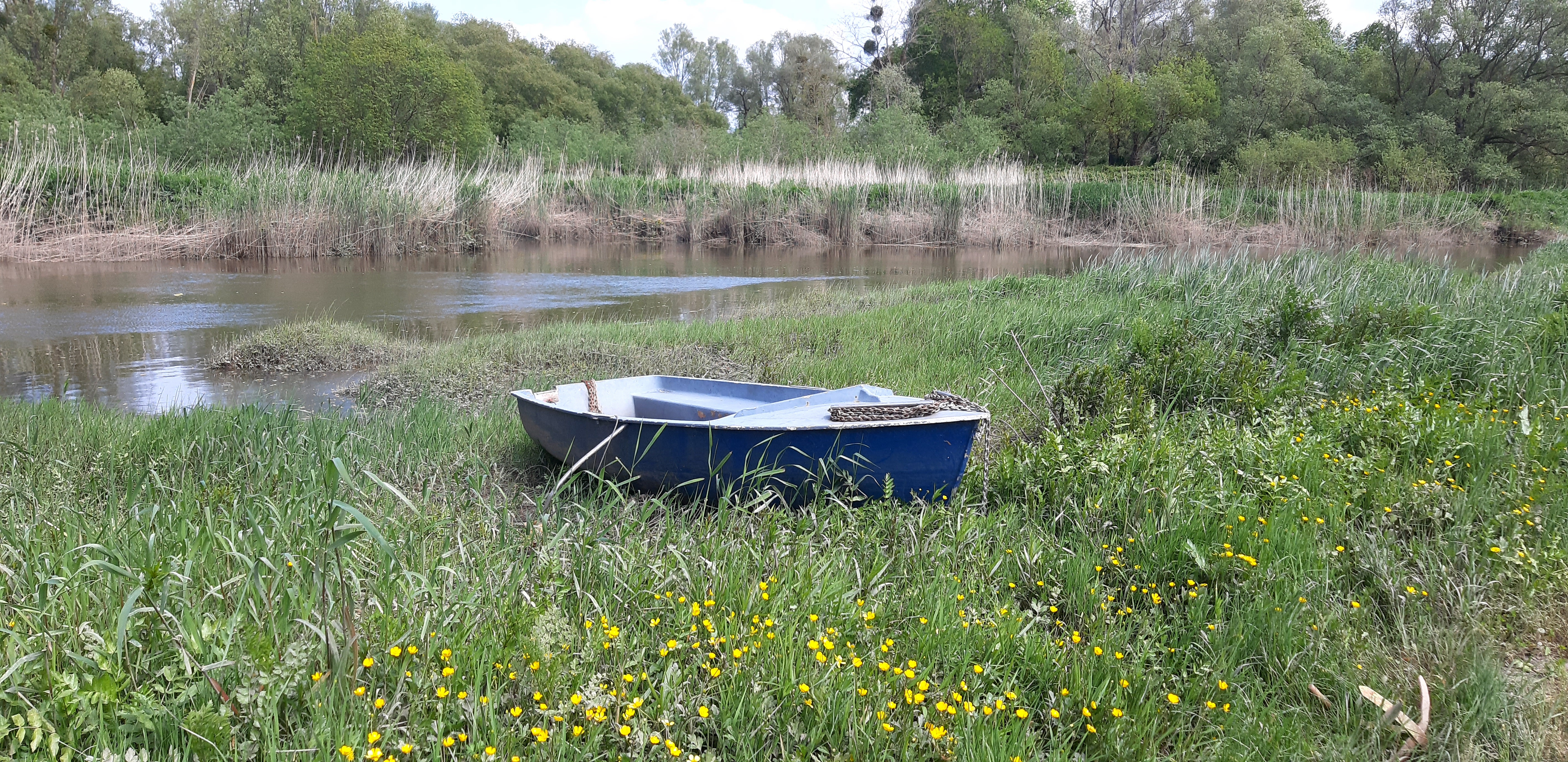
Fishing boat

=== Economic activities ===
Port Lavigne is primarily a residential village. Economic activities include a dry port that provides winter storage for pleasure boats and offers ship repair services. Natural areas within the public domain, managed by the Grand Port Maritime, are subject to agreements with local farmers for agricultural use, including cattle grazing. The village also functions as a recreational area, featuring a hiking trail managed by the municipality of Bouguenais.

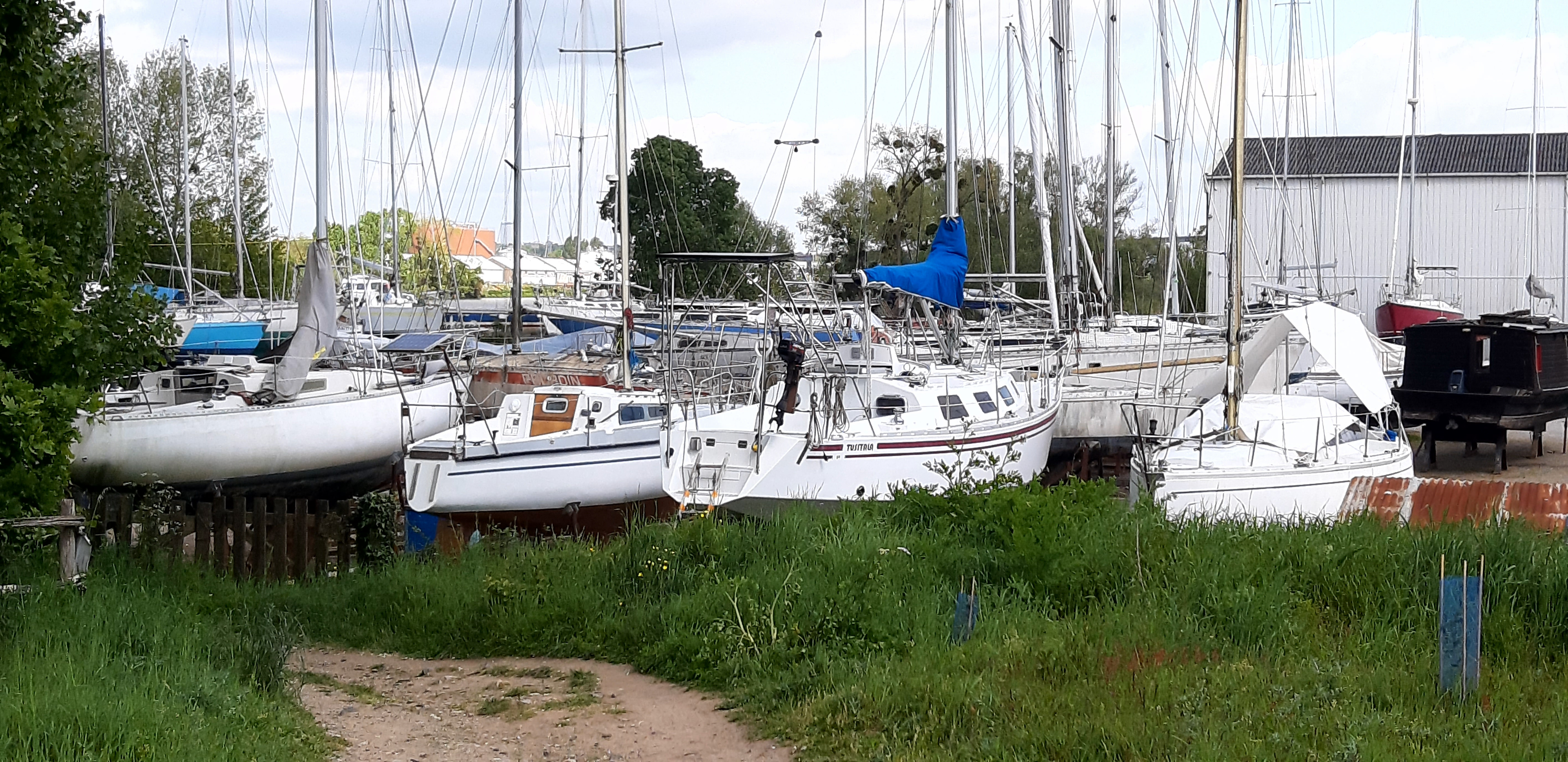
Dry port

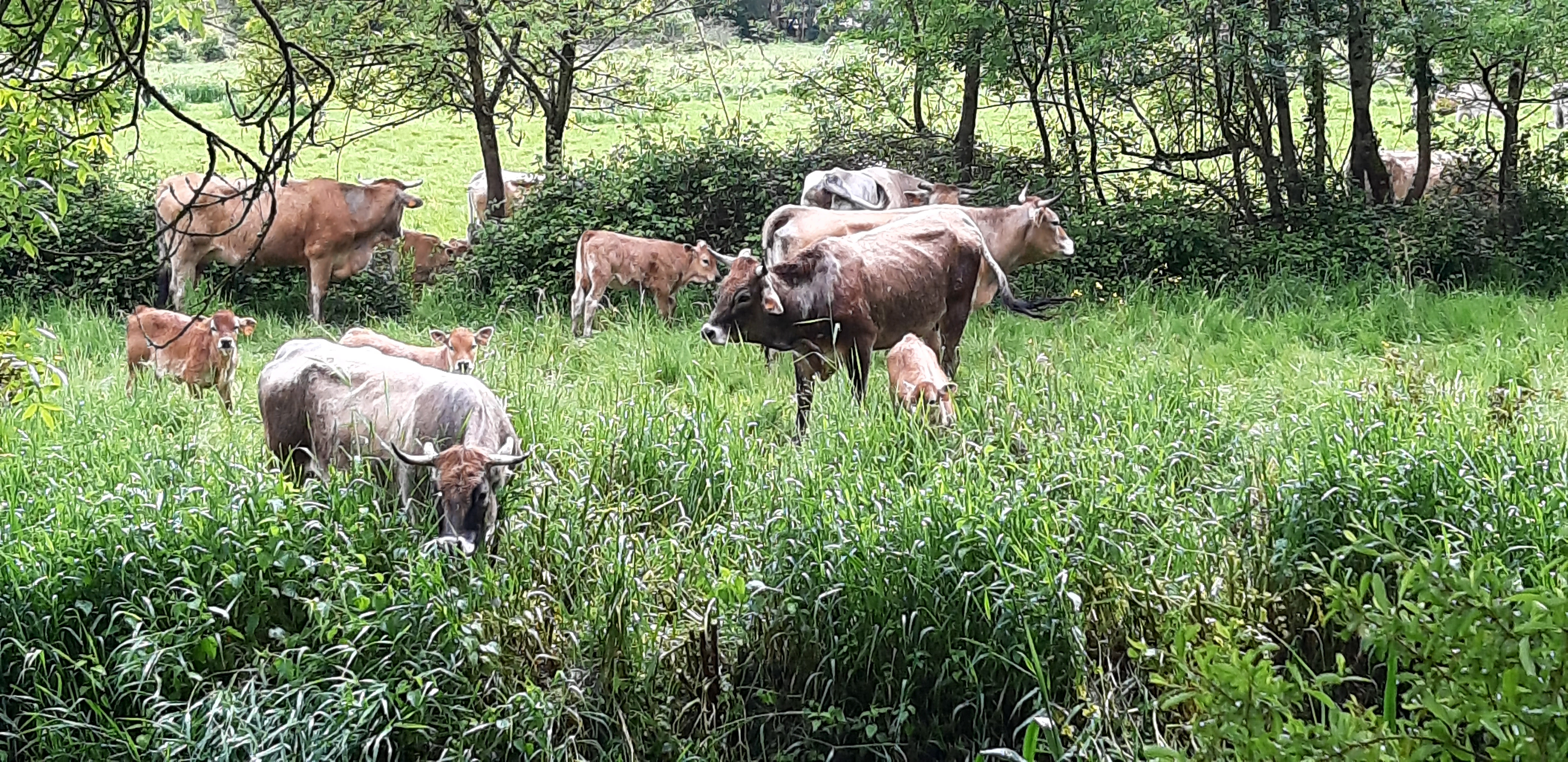
Cattle grazing in a wet meadow

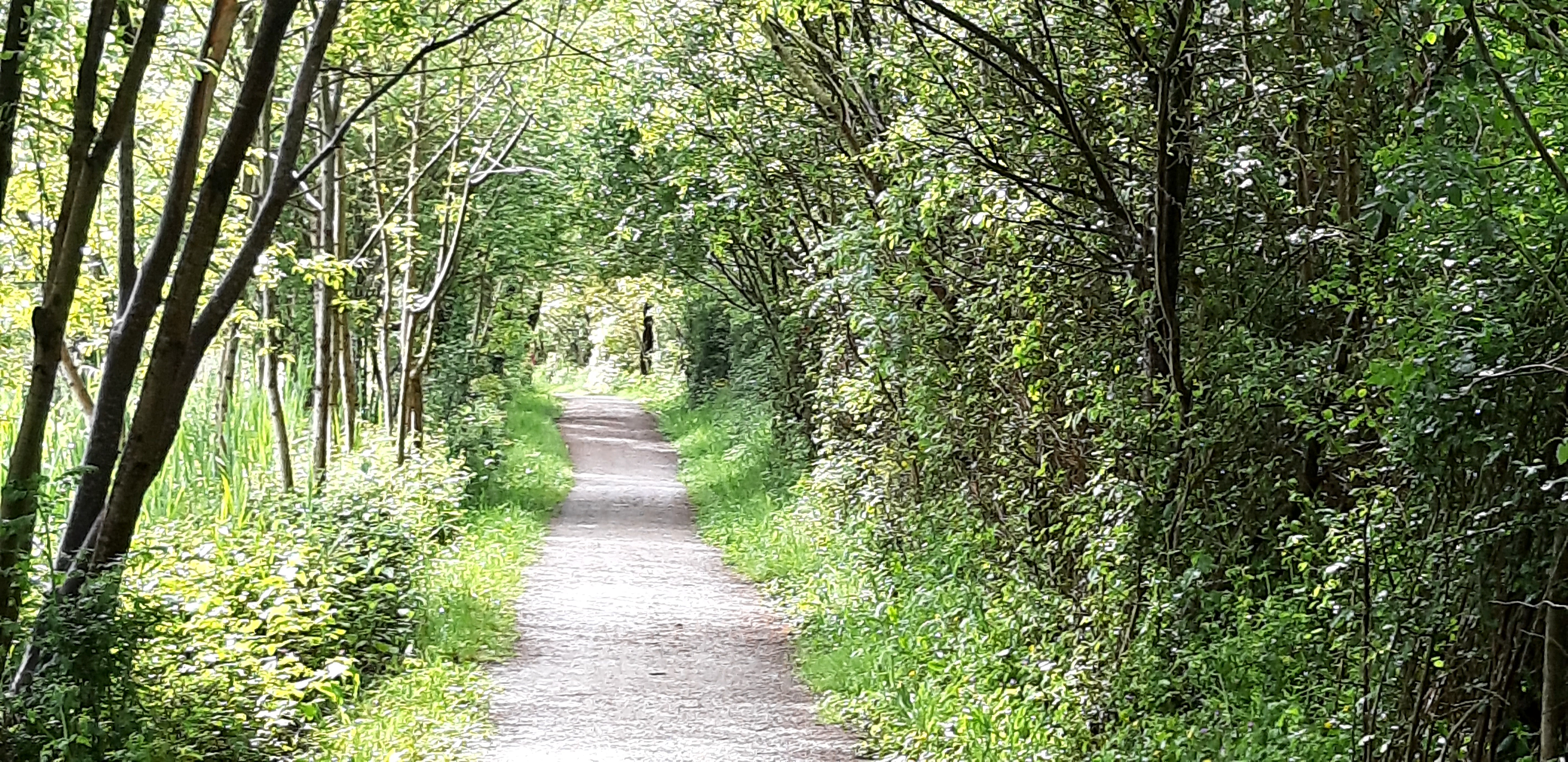
Hiking trail

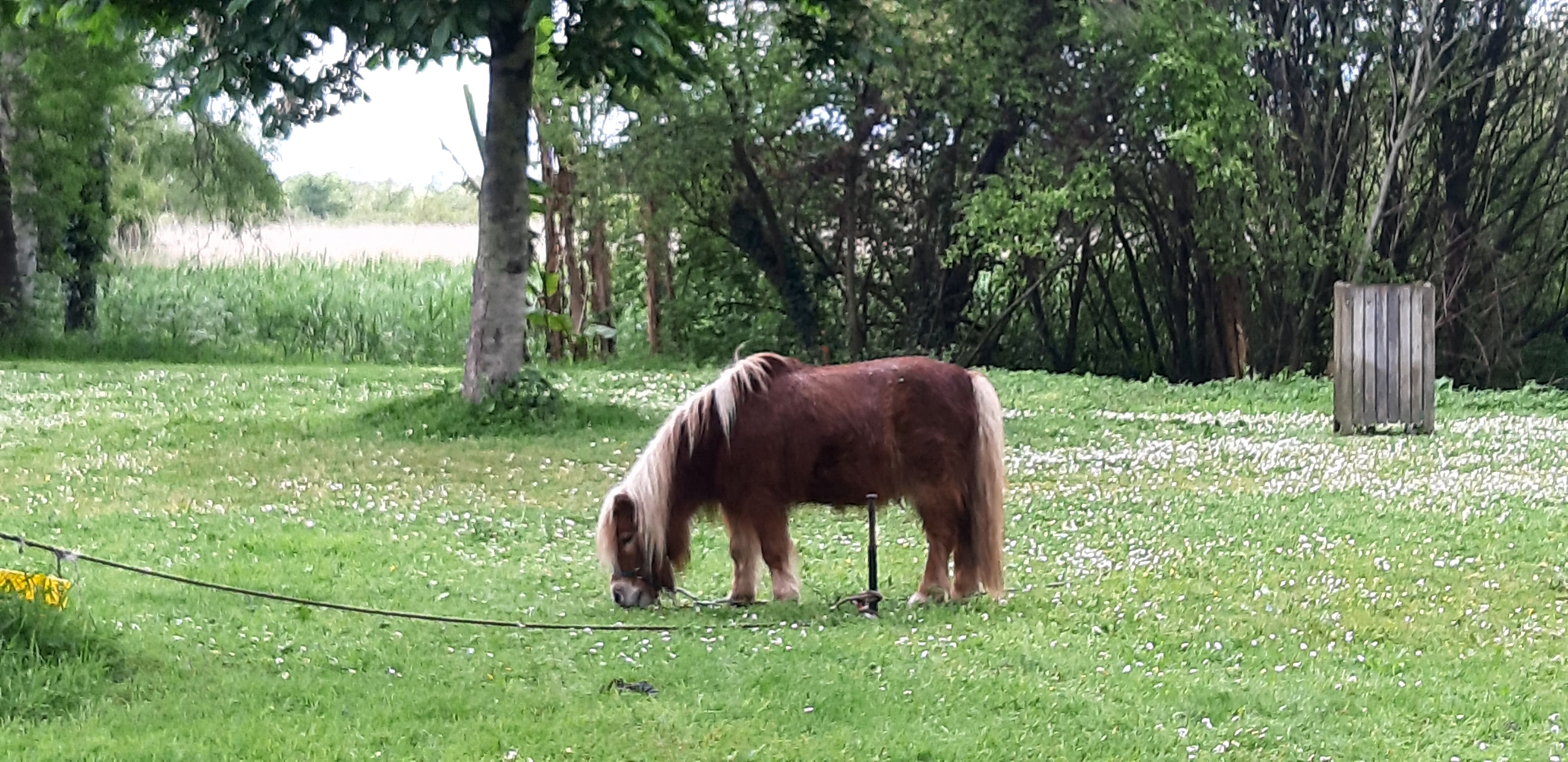
Pony used for maintaining public spaces

== Ecological interest ==
=== Endemic species ===
Port Lavigne is home to several notable plant species, including the estuarine angelica (Angelica heterocarpa), which is found only in the estuaries of the Loire, Charente, Gironde, and Adour rivers. Classified as a heritage species, it is listed on the Red List of threatened species, and both the plant and its habitat are protected at the European level. The estuarine angelica, along with the triangular club-rush present on the site, is included in a conservation plan for the Loire estuary.

The umbels of estuarine angelica bloom in June and July. They can be distinguished from the white-flowered umbels of the saffron water-dropwort, which blooms in May, by their leaves: angelica leaves are divided into oval leaflets with small teeth, whereas water-dropwort leaves are parallelogram-shaped with incised teeth.

The triangular club-rush is present at Port Lavigne from May to October, forming reed beds approximately one meter high, shorter than those of the broadleaf cattail also found on the site. Other notable plant species include the purple loosestrife, which blooms from July to September and typically has six violet petals, and the arrowhead, with flowers appearing from May onward.

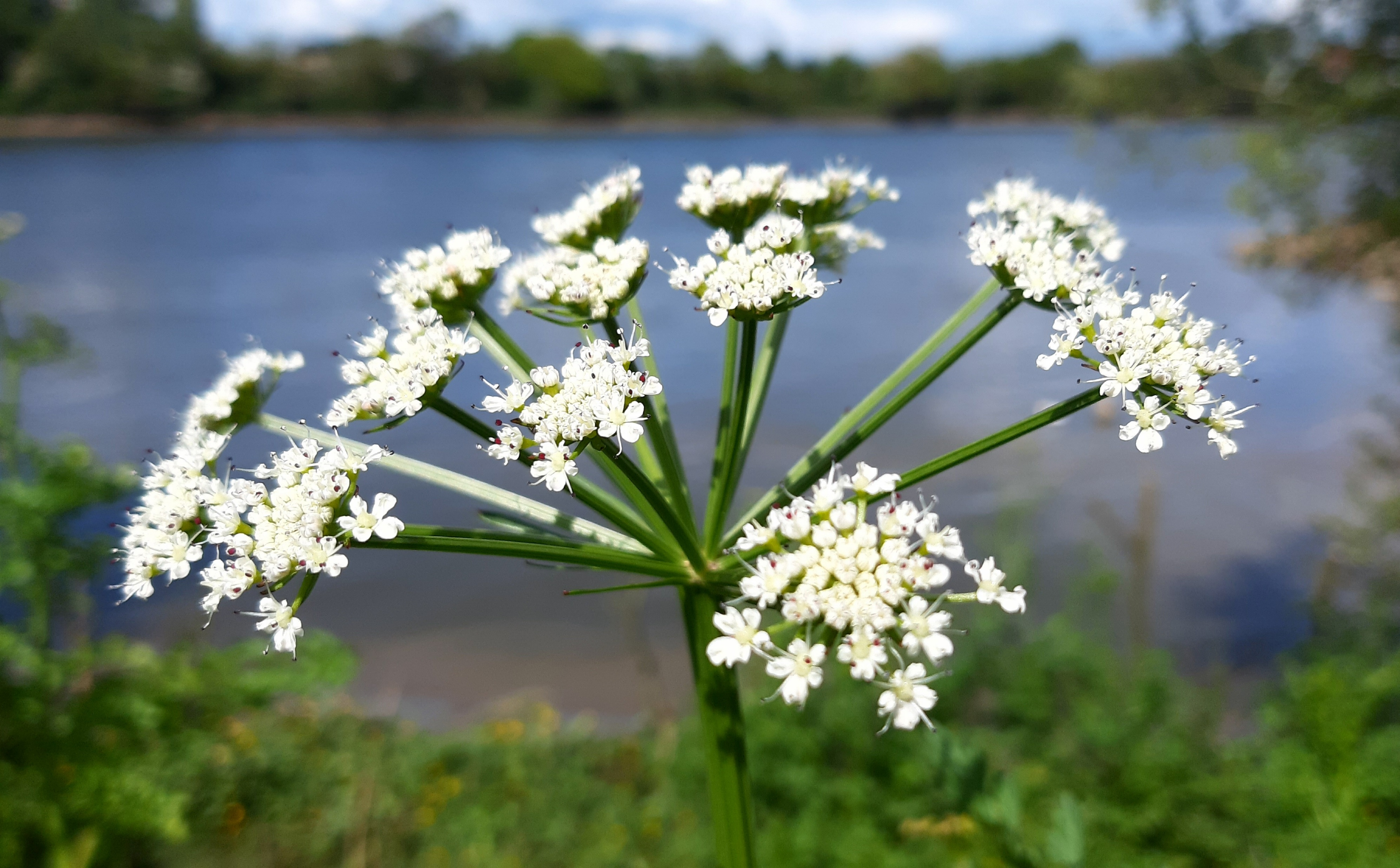
Saffron milkwort

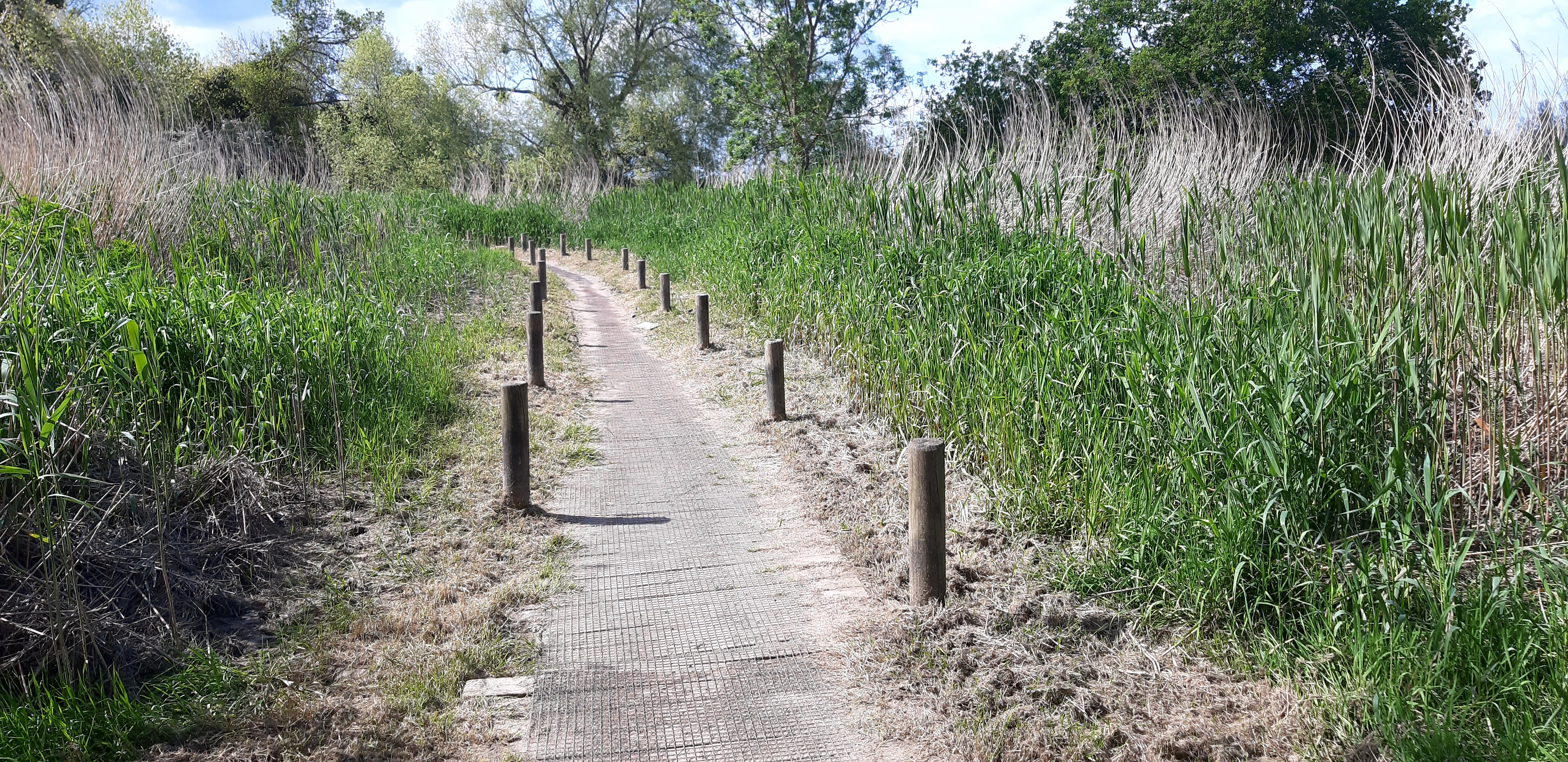
Hiking trail through the broadleaf cattail reed bed

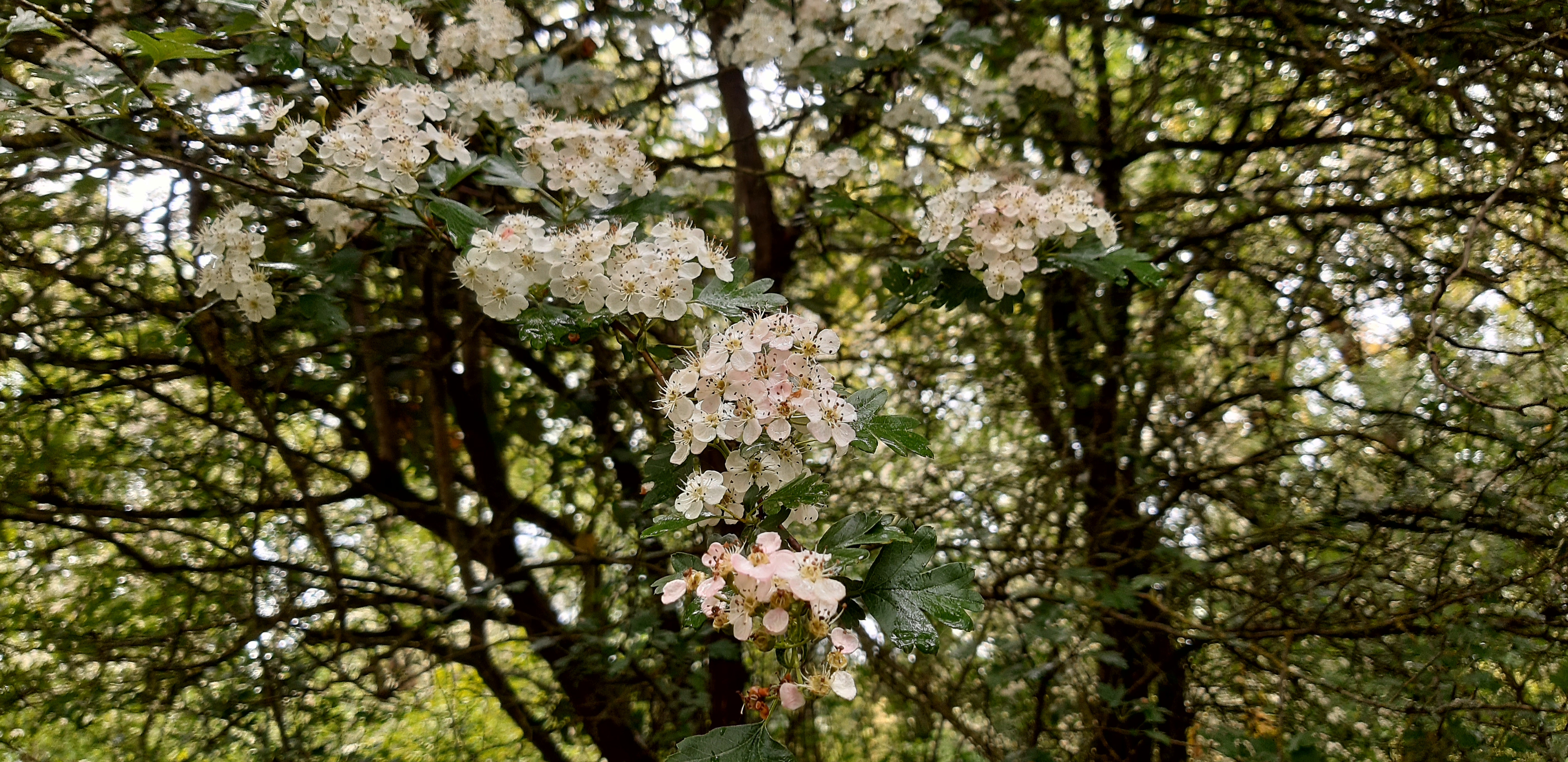
Hawthorn

=== Exotic species ===
Bamboo has been planted near the riverbank, with its spread controlled through regular cutting. At the base of the bamboo grove, Bohemian knotweed grows, identifiable by its large leaves. Unlike the bamboo, this species established itself naturally, and measures are taken to limit its propagation by periodically uprooting the plants.

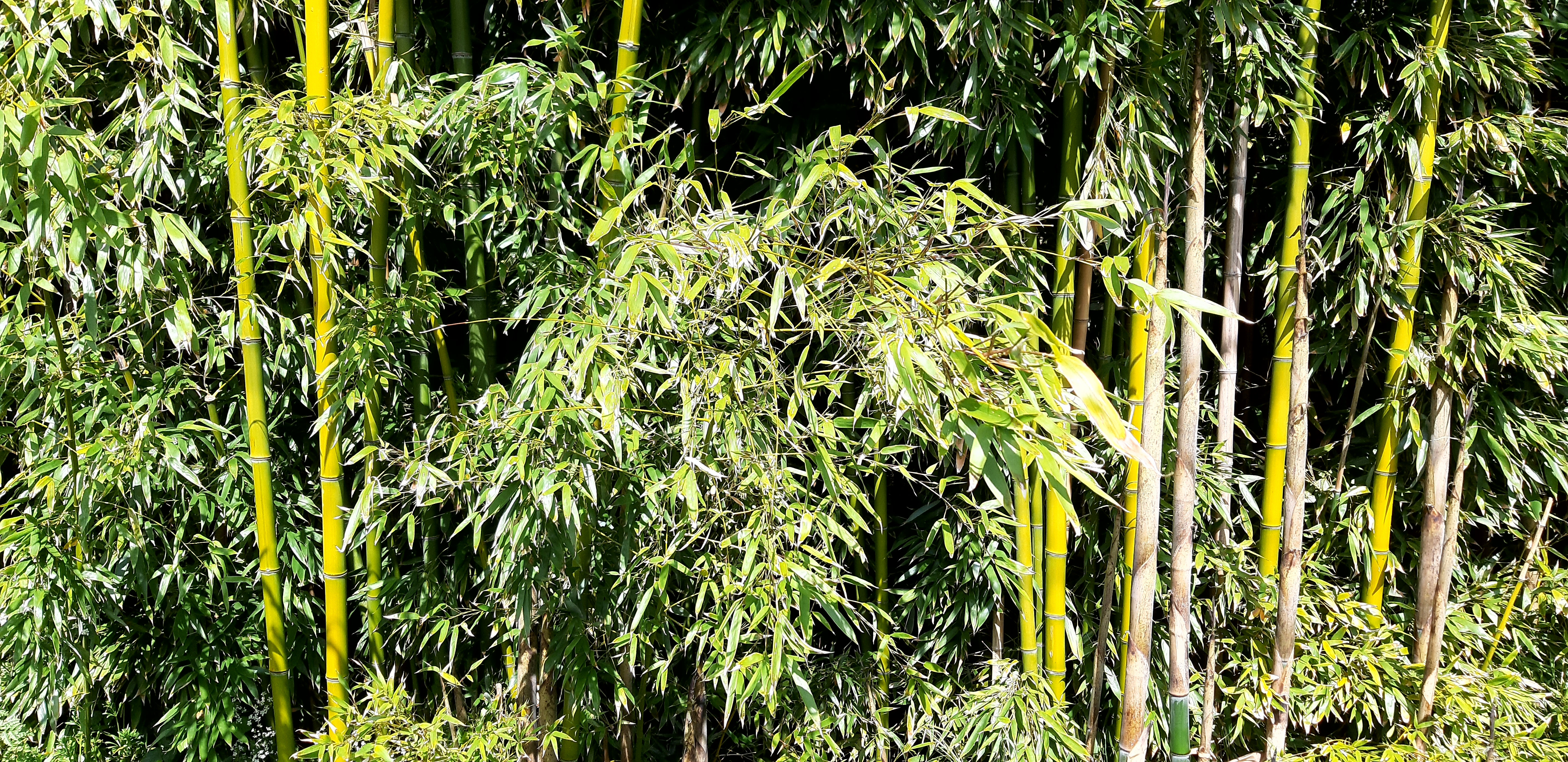
Port Lavigne bamboo grove (non-native plant species)

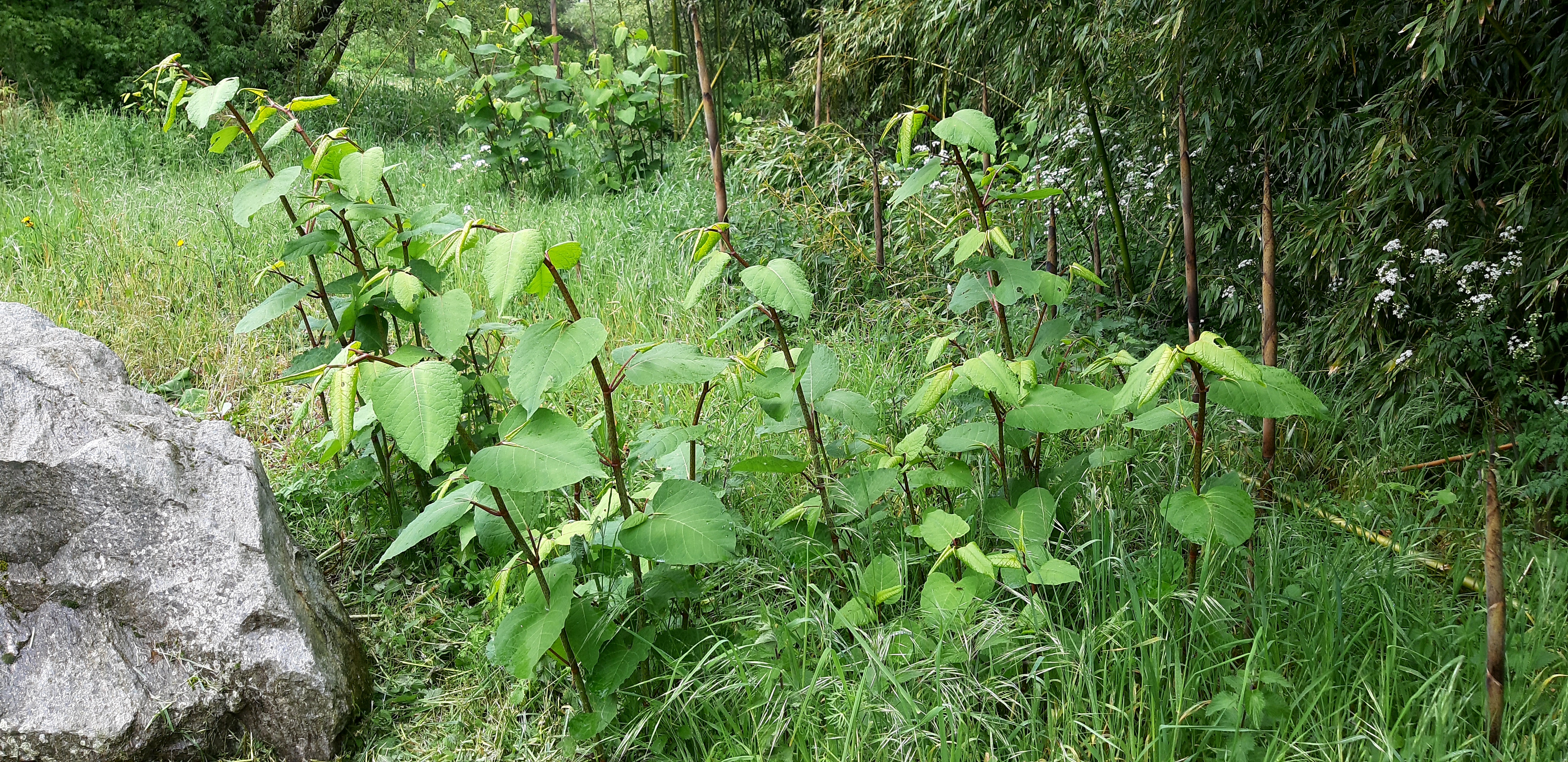
Bohemian knotweed
