= Régional Flight 7775 =

2007 aviation accident in France

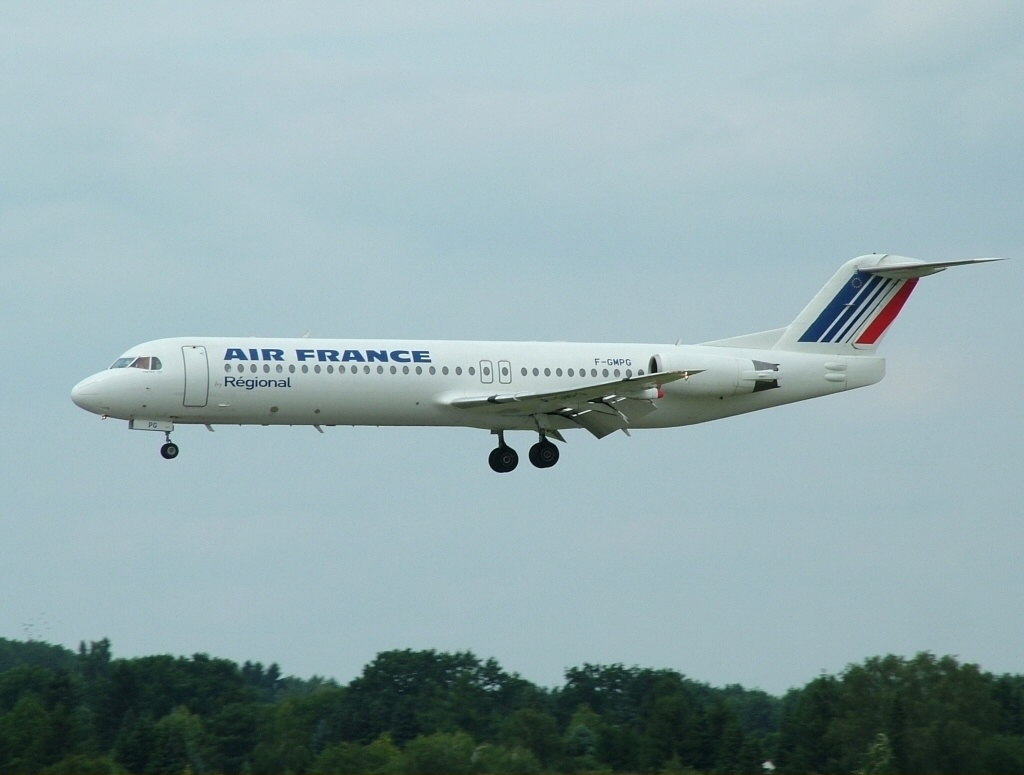
- F-GMPG, the accident aircraft, seen 2005

Accident
- Date: 25 January 2007
- Summary: Stall during take-off due to icing and excessive rotation
- Site: Pau Pyrénées Airport, France; 43°22′12″N 0°23′54″W

Aircraft
- Aircraft type: Fokker 100
- Operator: Régional for Air France
- IATA flight No.: AF7775
- Call sign: AIRFRANS ROMEO TANGO
- Registration: F-GMPG
- Flight origin: Pau Pyrénées Airport, France
- Destination: Charles de Gaulle Airport, Paris, France
- Occupants: 54
- Passengers: 50
- Crew: 4
- Fatalities: 0
- Survivors: 54

Ground casualties
- Ground fatalities: 1

Régional Flight 7775 was a scheduled domestic passenger flight from Pau Pyrénées Airport to Charles de Gaulle Airport in France which crashed shortly after takeoff during wintry conditions. The flight was operated by Air France's regional subsidiary Régional using a Fokker 100. All passengers survived the incident but one person on the ground was killed. An investigation by the BEA determined that the cause of the accident was ice on the wings of the aircraft along with excessive rotation in the weather conditions during takeoff.

== Aircraft ==
The aircraft involved in the incident was a Fokker 100 with the serial number 11362 and registration F-GMPG. It had its maiden flight in October 1991. The aircraft was initially delivered to TAT European Airlines and later operated by Air Liberté. It was subsequently leased to Air Corsica and then to Régional in 2005.

== Accident ==
The aircraft was to return to Paris. After startup the crew were cleared to taxi to Runway 13 for departure. Takeoff clearance was given at 11:25:15. A few seconds later TOGA power was selected. At 11:26:00 the crew noticed birds in the vicinity. The takeoff roll was normal and the airplane lifted off the runway at 11:26:08 at a speed of 128 kts. Immediately after takeoff, it banked suddenly to the left with a maximum bank angle of 35 degrees. The aural "Bank Angle" alarm sounded on the flight deck. The airplane then banked to the right with a maximum bank angle of 67 degrees. After a second left bank (59 degrees) an aural alarm "Don't Sink" sounded. The airplane had reached a height of 107 feet. At 11:26:21 the airplane bounced after the right main landing gear had touched the ground. The captain decided to abort the takeoff. The speed at that time was 160 kts. Engine power was reduced and the Fokker contacted the ground again at 11:26:27, near the end and to the right of runway 13. The thrust reversers were briefly deployed. The airplane ran 340 m, collided with the perimeter fence. Upon crossing a road, the left main landing gear struck the cabin of a truck, killing the driver. Both main gears were sheared off as the airplane struck a slope past the road. It continued into a field and came to rest at 11:26:49.

== Investigation and cause ==
The Bureau of Enquiry and Analysis for Civil Aviation Safety conducted an investigation into the crash and announced that the cause was heavy ice on the wings. The investigation also determined that the captain raised the Fokker at a steeper angle of attack than necessary during the takeoff Rotation and underestimated the atmospheric conditions. The report concluded that although the chosen angle of attack would not have conventionally resulted in a stall, the ice on the wings had created extra drag and no aircraft de-icing had been carried out before take-off. Although both pilots had observed birds near the runway, no evidence of birdstrike was found.

== See also ==
- Air Florida Flight 90
- Continental Airlines Flight 1713
- Turkish Airlines Flight 301
