= Pau Pyrénées Airport =

Pau Pyrénées Airport Aéroport Pau Pyrénées
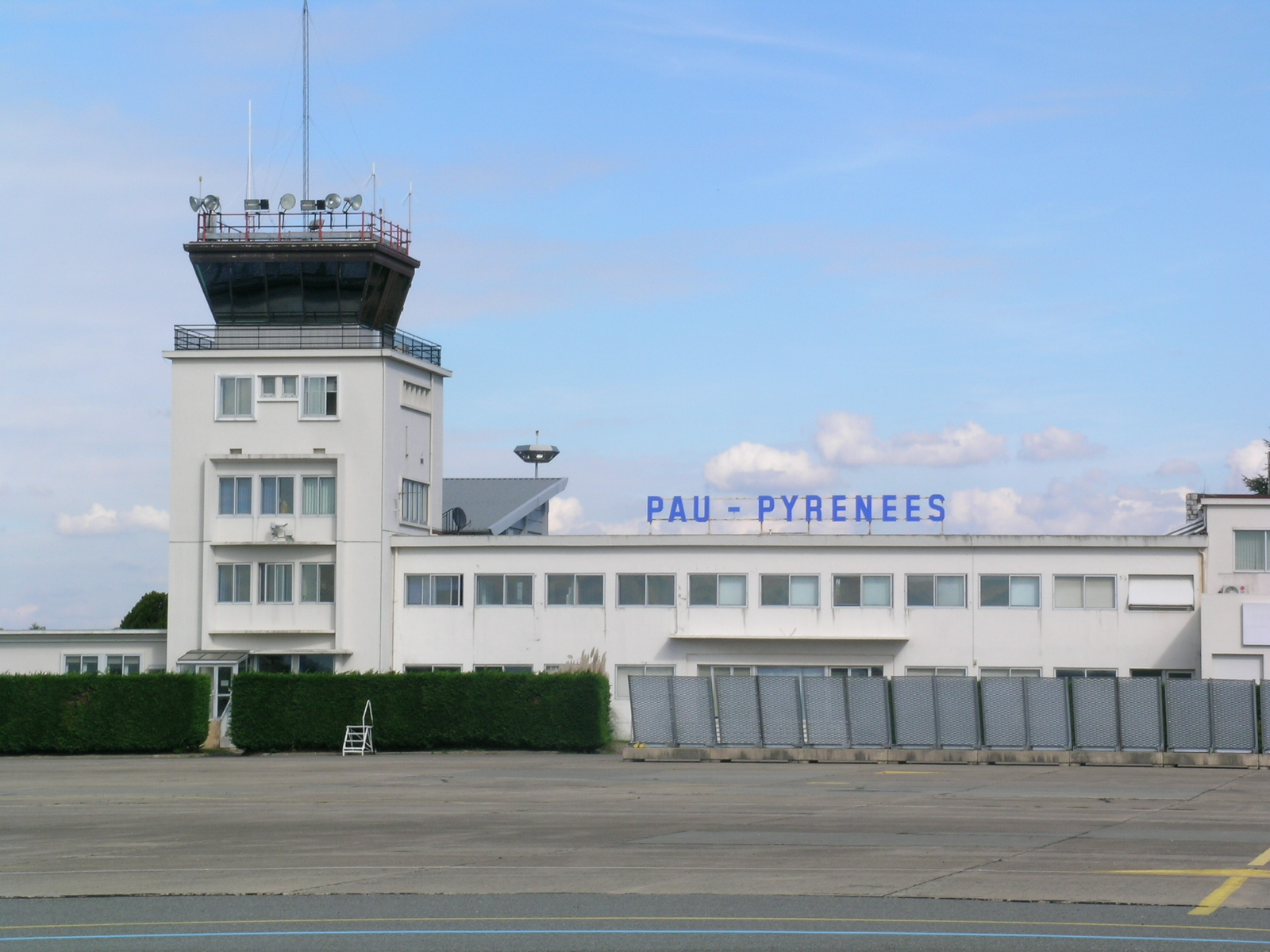
- IATA: PUF; ICAO: LFBP

Summary
- Airport type: Public
- Operator: Pau Chamber of Commerce
- Location: Pau, Pyrénées-Atlantiques
- Elevation AMSL: 188 m (617 ft)
- Coordinates: 43°22′48″N 000°25′07″W

Map
- Location of airport in Nouvelle-Aquitaine region LFBP (France)

Runways
| Direction | Length | | Surface |
| Direction | m | ft | Surface |
|---|---|---|---|
| 13/31 | 2,500 | 8,202 | Asphalt |

Statistics (2018)
- Passengers: 612,580
- Passenger traffic change: ▲2.1%
- Sources: Aeroport.fr

Pau Pyrénées Airport (French: Aéroport Pau Pyrénées) (IATA: PUF, ICAO: LFBP) is an airport serving Pau, France. It is located 10 km (6.2 mi) northwest of Pau in Uzein, a commune of the département of Pyrénées-Atlantiques (named for the Pyrénées mountains and the Atlantic Ocean).

== Airlines and destinations ==
The following airlines operate regular scheduled and charter flights at Pau Pyrénées Airport:

| Airlines | Destinations |
|---|---|
| Air France | Paris–Charles de Gaulle; Seasonal: Ajaccio, Figari |
| Amelia International | Paris–Orly |
| Chalair Aviation | Seasonal: Brest, Kerry |
| Transavia | Paris–Orly |
| Twin Jet | Lyon, Marseille |

== Military usage ==
Apart from the civilian terminal, there are military installations on the south side of the airfield. These host the 4th Special Forces Helicopter Regiment, the 5th Combat Helicopter Regiment and the French Army's paratrooper's training.

== Aircraft production ==
In 2015 Airbus announced that its E-Fan electric aircraft was to be produced at Pau Pyrénées Airport, at a new facility to be constructed in 2016. The location was chosen to be near the DAHER-SOCATA plant at Tarbes. First deliveries of the E-Fan were expected at the end of 2017 or early 2018 however the programme was cancelled by Airbus in 2017.

== Accidents and incidents ==
- On 25 January 2007, Air France Flight 7775 from Pau to Paris crashed shortly after take-off. All 54 passengers and crew escaped from the Fokker 100 although one person was killed on the ground. An investigation by the BEA revealed that the cause of the accident was ice on the wings of the aircraft involved.
