= Air France Hop =

Regional airline subsidiary of Air France

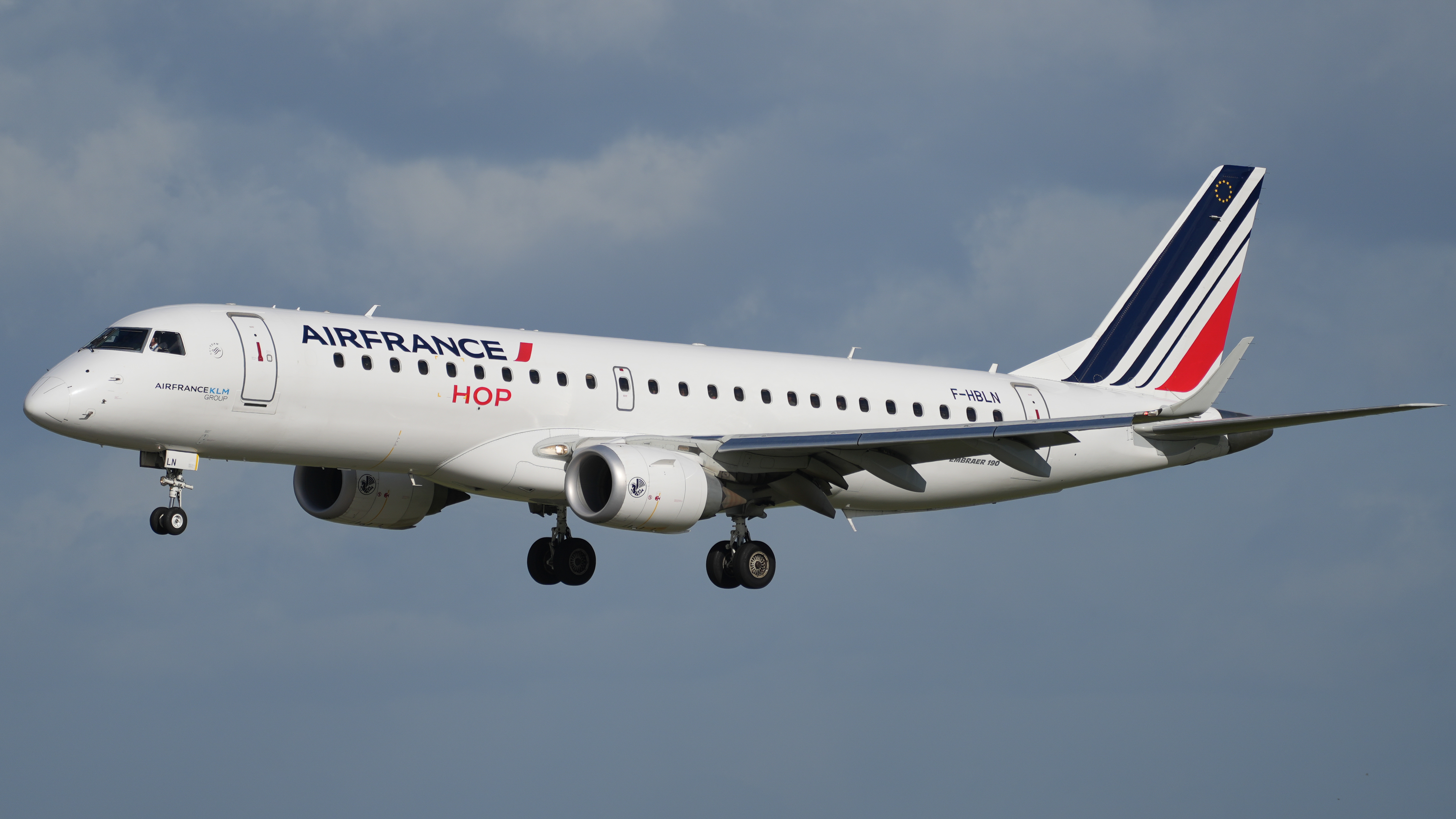
- Embraer 190
IATA	ICAO	Call sign
A5	HOP	AIR HOP
- Founded: 21 December 2012; 13 years ago
- Commenced operations: 31 March 2013; 13 years ago (as Hop!); 1 September 2019; 7 years ago (as Air France Hop)
- Operating bases: Lyon; Paris–Charles de Gaulle
- Frequent-flyer program: Flying Blue
- Alliance: SkyTeam (affiliate)
- Fleet size: 38
- Destinations: 50
- Parent company: Air France
- Headquarters: Nantes Atlantique Airport, Bouguenais, France
- Website: www.hop.fr/en

Air France Hop, formerly branded just HOP!, is a French regional airline operating flights on behalf of its parent company Air France. The airline was founded on 21 December 2012 after the merger of Airlinair, Brit Air and Régional operations on 31 March 2012. Its head office is at Nantes Atlantique Airport.

== History ==
Logo (2012–2019)

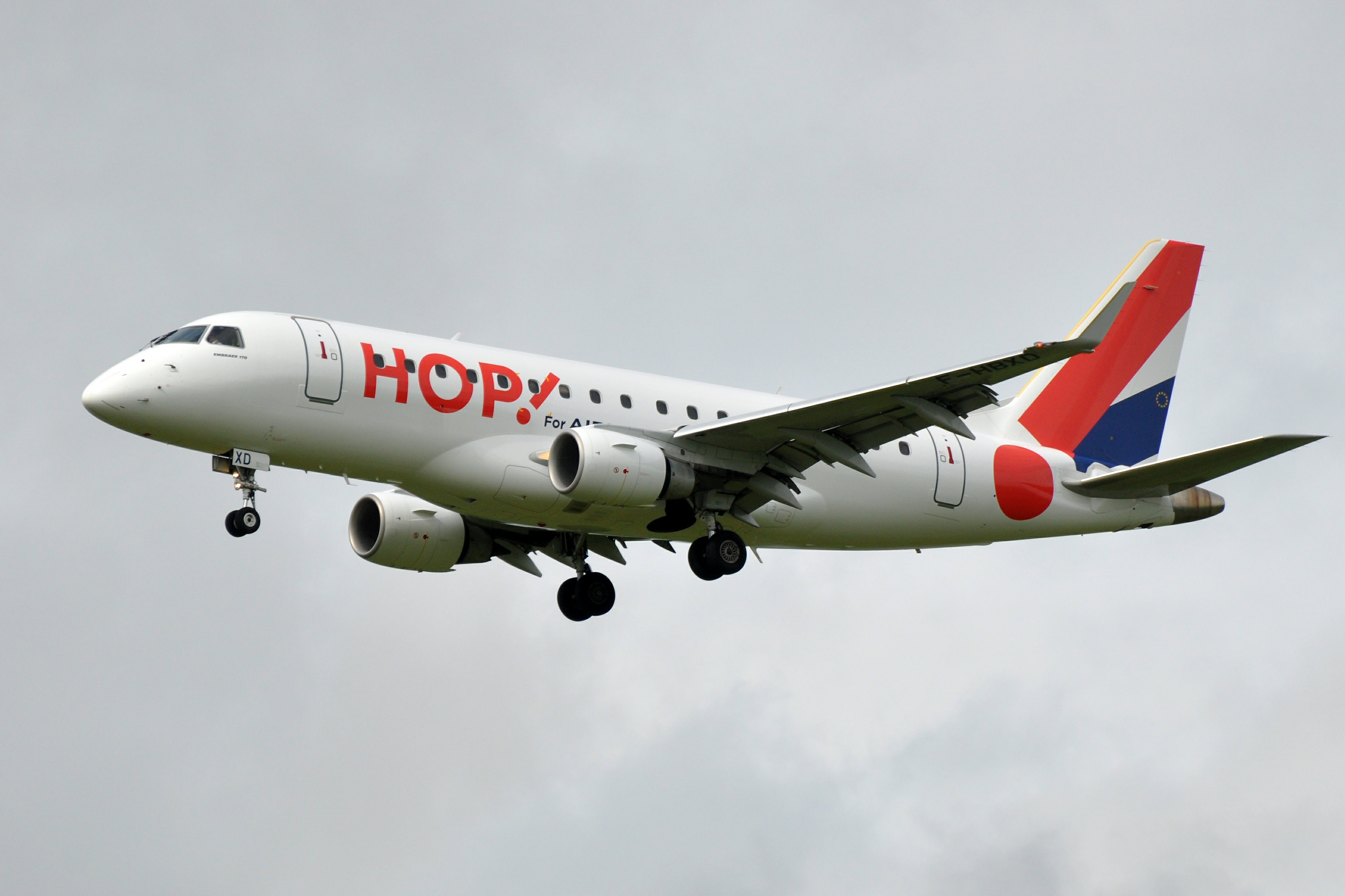
Embraer 170 in previous colors

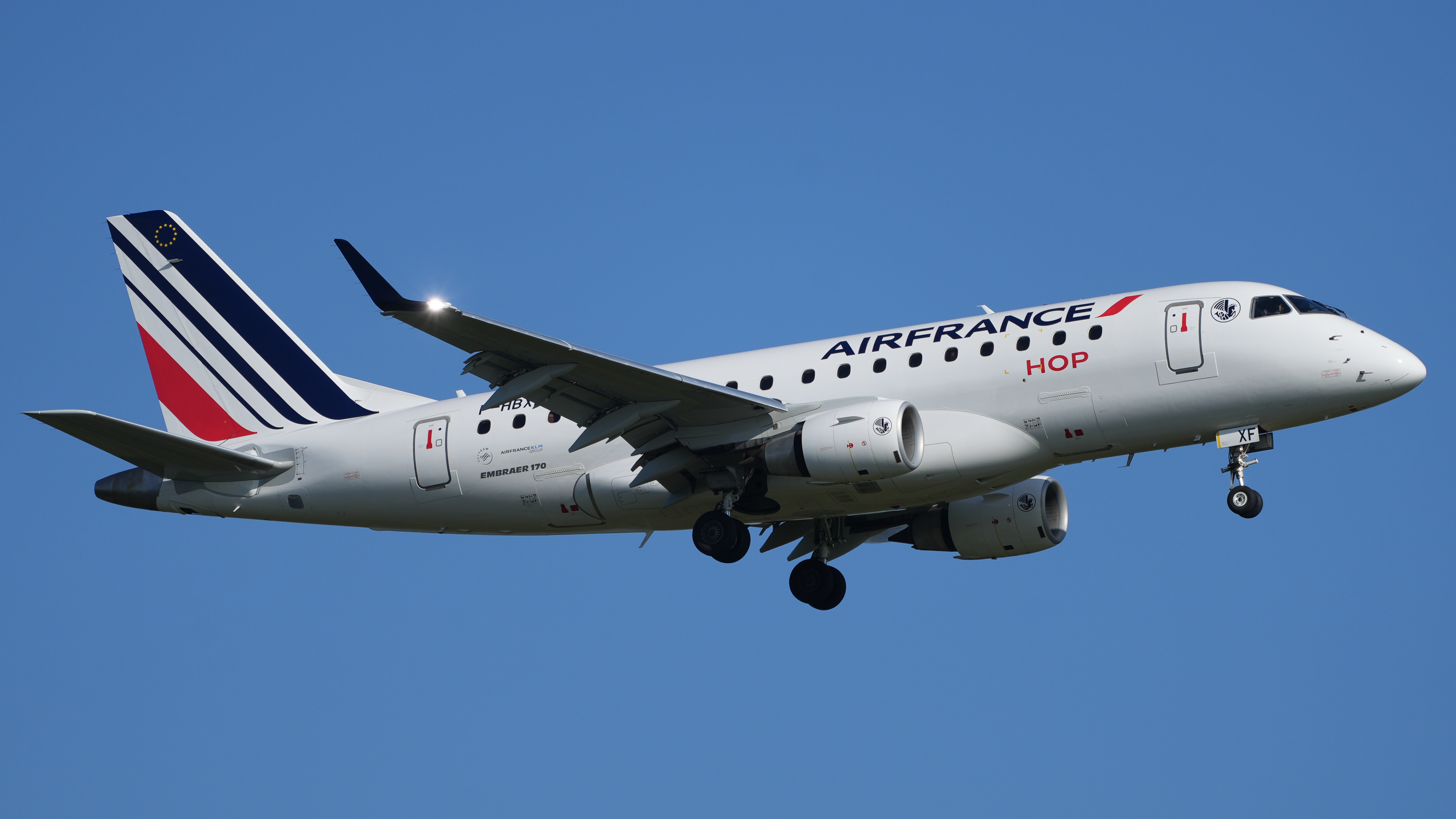
Embraer 170

The new airline brand was created to better compete with the low-cost airlines which had taken a significant market share of Air France's regional routes. Régional operated with 44 aircraft to 38 destinations; Brit Air had 39 aircraft and served 32 destinations; and Airlinair served 26 destinations with its 24 aircraft; a combined total of 107 aircraft. These three airlines merged operations under the HOP! brand on 31 March 2012. As a fully registered airline Hop was established in January 2013 as an Air France subsidiary. It took over control of operations from the following 31 March.

In July 2015, Air France–KLM announced the formalization of the merger in year 2017 of Airlinair, Brit Air, and Régional brands under the Hop!, after having already legally grouped their assets under the eponymous company, thereby reducing its costs.

In October 2018, it was reported that HOP! would face restructuring measures, including the merger of all operations under the AF flight codes of parent Air France and a revision of the operated aircraft types.

On 1 February 2019, Air France announced that HOP! services would be rebranded as "Air France Hop". The first aircraft received the revised livery, being the one of Air France with small HOP! titles added, in May 2019.

On 1 September 2019, all HOP! flights started to be operated under the Air France brand and flight code. All aircraft were gradually repainted in full Air France livery. In December 2020, it was announced that HOP! would be restructured as a smaller feeder carrier. This new plan would see HOP! disappearing as a separate brand from Air France, transferring its Paris-Orly hub to Transavia France, and retiring its Bombardier CRJ fleet.

== Destinations ==
=== Codeshare agreements ===
Air France Hop has codeshare agreements with the following airlines:

- Air Corsica
- Air France

== Fleet ==
=== Current fleet ===
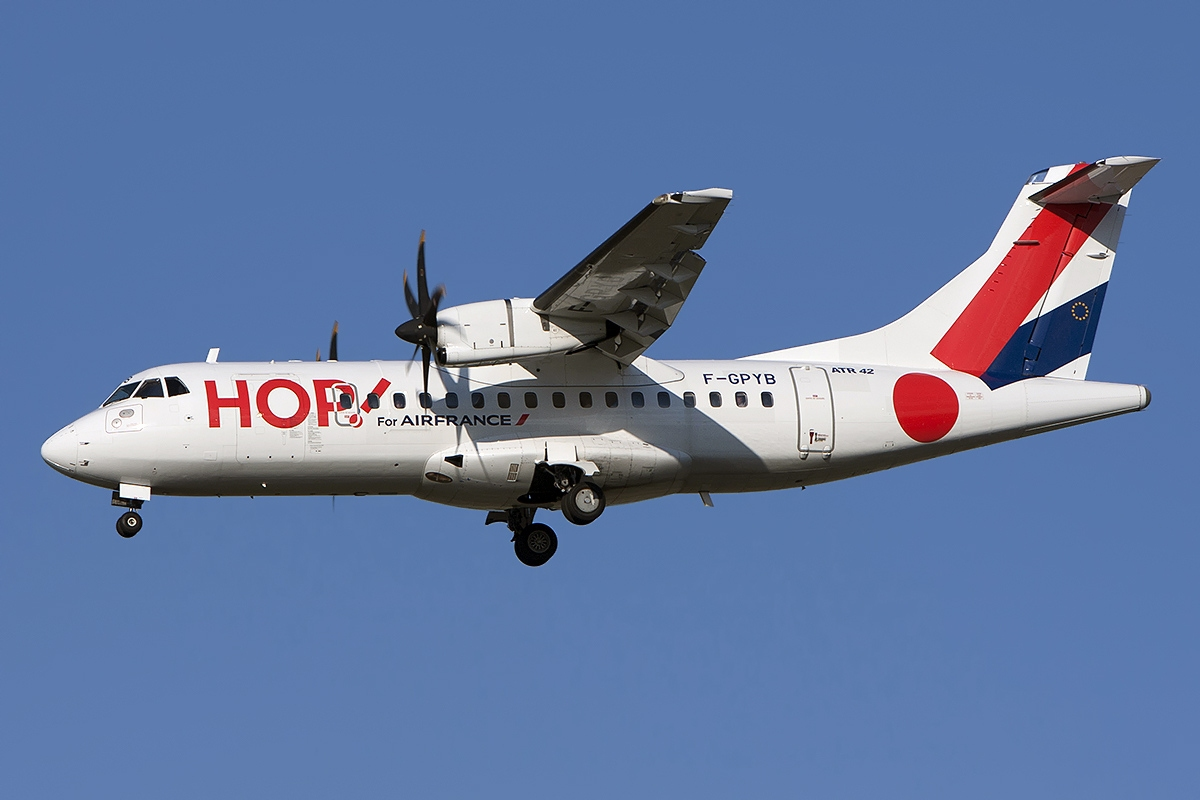
ATR 42-500

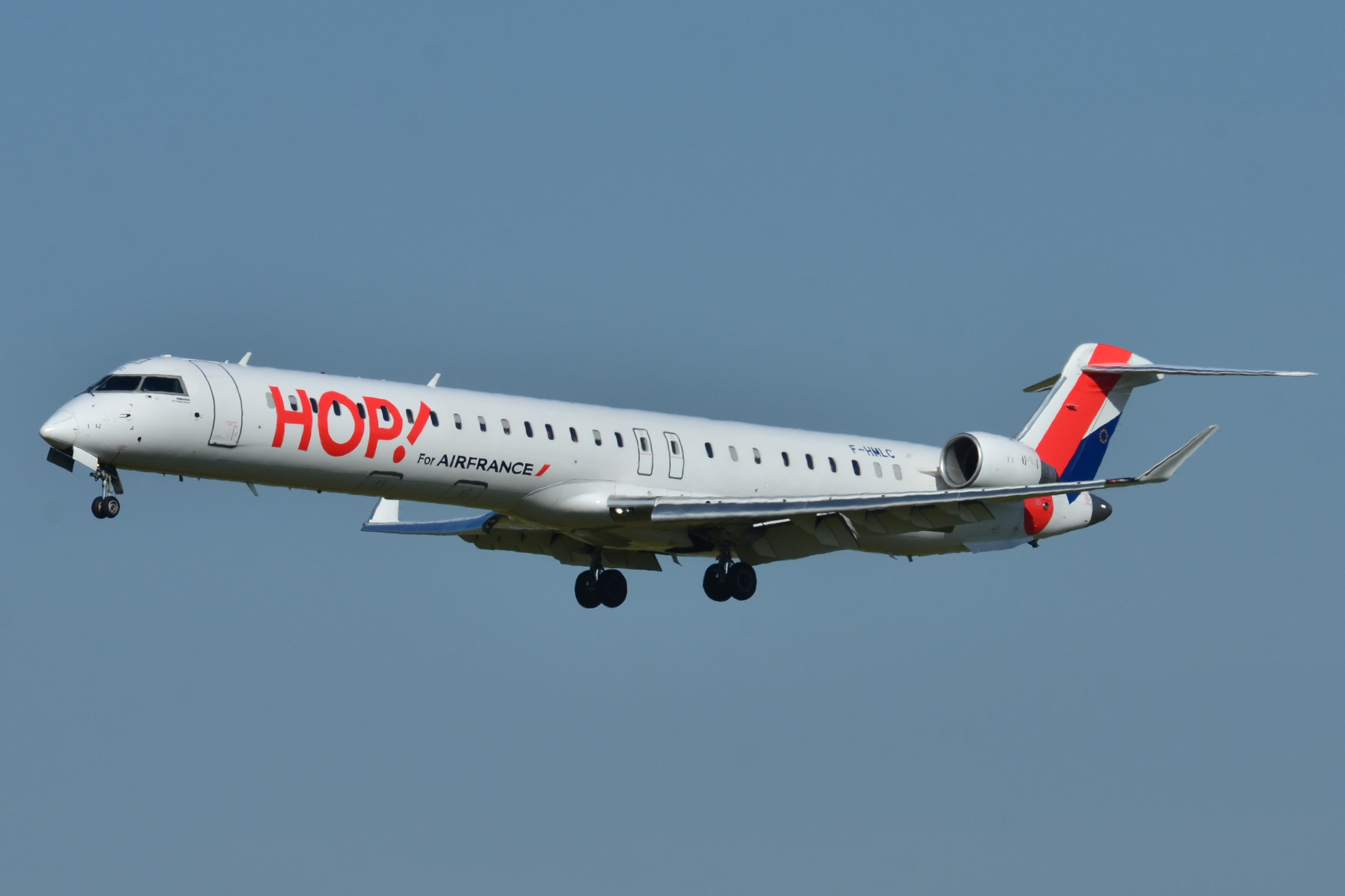
Bombardier CRJ1000

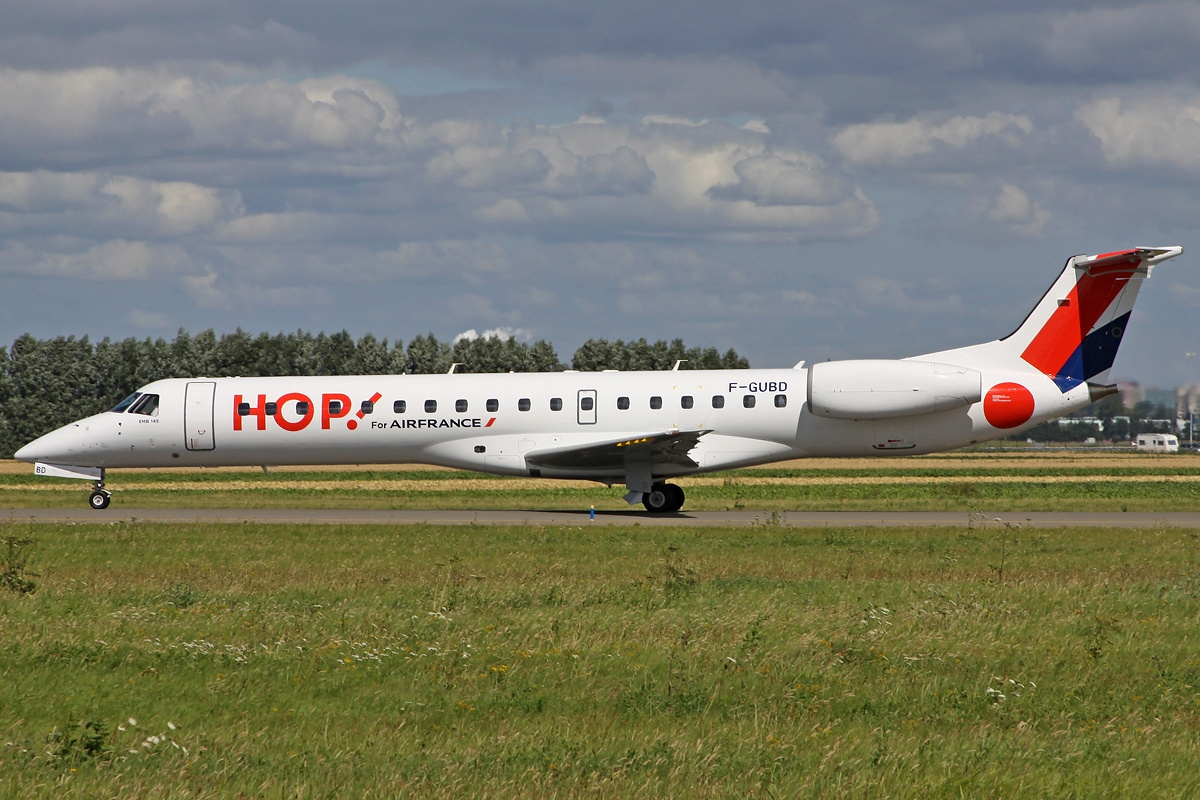
Embraer ERJ 145

As of July 2026, Air France Hop operates the following aircraft:

Air France Hop fleet
Aircraft	In service	Orders	Passengers	Notes
Embraer 170	10	—	76	
Embraer 190	28	—	100	
Total	38	—		

=== Former fleet ===
As of August 2025, Air France Hop operated 13 Embraer 170 and 26 Embraer 190

== See also ==
- List of airlines of France
