= Tati =

Tati can refer to:

== Locations ==
- Tati River, Botswana
  - Tati Goldfields
  - Tati Concessions Land
- Tati, Ranchi, a town in Jharkhand, India
- Tatí Yupí Refuge, a biological reserve in the district of Hernandarias, Alto Paraná Department, Paraguay

== Music ==
- Tati (musical instrument), a stringed instrument used in traditional folk music by the Naga people in North Eastern India and north-western Myanmar
- Tati (album), a 2005 album by Italian trumpeter Enrico Rava
- "Tati" (song), a song by American rapper 6ix9ine and DJ SpinKing

== Organisations ==
- TATI University College, a private university college in Malaysia
- Tati (company), a defunct French textile retail company

== People ==
- Tati (queen), ancient Nubian queen of Egypt
- Tati Barra (born 1989), Brazilian politician
- Tati Esad Murad Kryeziu (1923–1993), heir presumptive to the throne of Albania prior to the birth of Prince Leka in 1939
- Tati Gabrielle (born 1996), American actress
- Tati Penna (1960–2021), Chilean singer, journalist and television personality
- Tati Quebra-Barraco (born 1980), Brazilian rapper
- Tati Rascón (born 1971), Spanish professional tennis player
- Tati Westbrook (born 1982), YouTube makeup artist
- Tati Zaqui (born 1994), Brazilian digital influencer
- Jacques Tati (1907–1982), French film director and actor
- Jean-Baptiste Tati Loutard (1938–2009), Congolese politician and poet
- Sherri Ann "Tati" Jarvis (1966–1980), American murder victim
- Tylel Tati (born 2008), French footballer

== Other uses ==
- 14621 Tati, a main-belt asteroid discovered in 1998
- Tati (film), a 1973 Brazilian film

== See also ==
- Tati language (disambiguation)
- Tat (disambiguation)
- Taty (disambiguation)
