= Nilson =

Nilson is both a surname and a given name variant of Nelson.

It thus can also be an anglicized version of the Scandinavian surnames Nilsen, Nielsen, and Nilsson. Notable people with the name include:

== Surname ==
- Anton Nilson (1887–1989), Swedish militant socialist
- Carlos Nilson, one of the members of the beat and rock band Los Naufragos
- Cynthia Nilson. songwriter and singer from Buenos Aires, Argentina
- Gunnar Nilson (1872–1951), Swedish physician
- Johan Ernst Nilson, Swedish explorer interested in environmental and climate-related issues
- John Nilson, Canadian politician in Saskatchewan
- Lars Fredrik Nilson (1840–1899), Swedish chemist who discovered scandium in 1879
- Lawrence Nilson, the Commander-in-chief of Bombay from 6 January 1785 to 6 September 1788
- Marcus Nilson (born 1978), Swedish professional ice hockey player
- Mitch Nilsson (born 1991), Australian professional baseball player
- Peter Nilson (1937–1998), Swedish astronomer and novelist

== Given name ==
- Nílson (footballer, born 1965), Nilson Esidio Mora, Brazilian football forward
- Nilson (footballer, born 1975), Nilson Corrêia Júnior, Brazilian football goalkeeper
- Nilson Cortes (born 1977), Colombian football striker
- Nilson (footballer, born 1987), Nilson Taty Sousa Vaz, Santomean football goalkeeper
- Nilson (footballer, born 1989), Nilson Ricardo da Silva Junior, Brazilian football defensive midfielder
- Nilson (footballer, born 1991), José Nilson dos Santos Silva, Brazilian football striker
- Nilson (Musician, Born 1981), Nilson Jaime Hernandez, Mexican Artist.

Was part of the group called Super Bandon Pobreza (2003-2018). He is currently a founder and bassist they group called La Ley Norteña (2019-Present)

== See also ==
- Nilson Nelson Gymnasium, an indoor sporting arena in Brasília, Brazil
- The Adventures of Nilson Groundthumper and Hermy, a comic series by Stan Sakai
