= Tat =

Tat or TAT may refer to:

== Geography ==
- Tát, a Hungarian village
- Tat Ali, an Ethiopian volcano
- Trinidad and Tobago, a Caribbean country

== People ==
- Tat, a son and disciple of Hermes Trismegistus
- Tiffani Amber Thiessen, initials T.A.T.
- Tat Wood, a British author

== Arts, entertainment, and media ==
- TAT (band), a punk/rock band from London, England
- TAT (theatre), a former theatre in Frankfurt
- Die Tat, a former magazine
- T.A.T. Communications Company, the former name of the defunct American television production company ELP Communications

== Aviation ==
- TAT, the IATA Airport code of Poprad-Tatry Airport
- TAT European Airlines, a former French regional airline
- Total air temperature, sometimes referred to as Stagnation Temperature
- Transcontinental Air Transport, a former US airline

== Enterprises and organizations ==
- Takraw Association of Thailand (TAT), a sport governing body of Thailand.
- Tat Bank, a bank based in Tehran, Iran
- The Astonishing Tribe (or TAT), the former name of the Swedish company Research In Motion
- Truckers Against Trafficking (or TAT), a nonprofit organization

== Ethnology ==
- Armeno-Tats, a subgroup of Armenians in the South Caucasus that speak the Tat language, a Southwestern Iranian language, a branch of Persian language
- Juhuri language, the Jewish Tat language
- Mountain Tats (Crimea), a mountain-dwelling subethnos of the Crimean Tatars
- Tat people (Caucasus), an Iranian people of Persian origin from the Caucasus
  - Tat language (Caucasus), a Southwestern Iranian language, a branch of Persian language
- Tat people (Iran), an Iranian ethnic group from Iran
  - Tati language (Iran), a Northwestern Iranian language
- The Three Affiliated Tribes (TAT), a Northern Plains Native American tribe also known as the Mandan, Hidatsa, and Arikara Nation

== Science, medicine and psychology ==
- Tat (HIV), Trans-Activator of Transcription, HIV protein
- Tapas Acupressure Technique, an alternative medicine therapy
- Targeted alpha-particle therapy, radiation therapy for cancer
- Thematic apperception test, a projective psychological test
- Thrombin–antithrombin complex, a protein complex
- Tropine acyltransferase, an enzyme
- Twin-arginine translocation pathway, cellular protein export pathway
- Tyrosine aminotransferase, an enzyme encoded by the TAT gene
- TAT, a codon for the amino acid Tyrosine

== Transport ==
- Talbot railway station, Australia
- Tattenham Corner railway station (National Rail station code), Surrey, England

== Other uses ==
- Tat, verb for the action of making lace, see Tatting
- Tat, informal for cheap, tasteless, useless goods; trinkets; tchotchke, tatty articles or a tatty condition
- Tat, short for tattoo
- Tat Tvam Asi, a Hindu philosophical concept
- Transatlantic telephone cable
- Turnaround time

== See also ==
- Tati (disambiguation)
