= Tatty =

Tatty or tattie may refer to:

- Tattie, the Scots word for potato
- A tattoo, a form of body modification with ink

== Popular culture ==
- Tatty (novel), a 2004 novel by Christine Dwyer Hickey
- "Tatty" (song), a song by Sleeper from their 1995 album Smart

== People ==
- Tatty Macleod, a Zimbabwe-born French-British comedian
- "Tatty", a nickname for retired Jamaican footballer Durrant Brown
- "Tattie", a nickname for Scottish bowls player Alex Marshall

=== Fictional characters ===
- Tatty Walker, a character in Swallows and Amazons (2016 film)
- Tatty Spaatz, a character in Masters of the Air
- Tatty Bogle, a character in Wizadora
- Tatty, a character in Chanshi
- Tattie McKee, a character in State of Grace (TV series)
- Tattie, a character in Valley of the Dolls (novel)
- Tattie Morgenstern, a character in Lady in the Lake (TV series)

== See also ==
- Tat (disambiguation)
- Tater (disambiguation)
