= Air Alpes =

French regional airline (1961–1981)

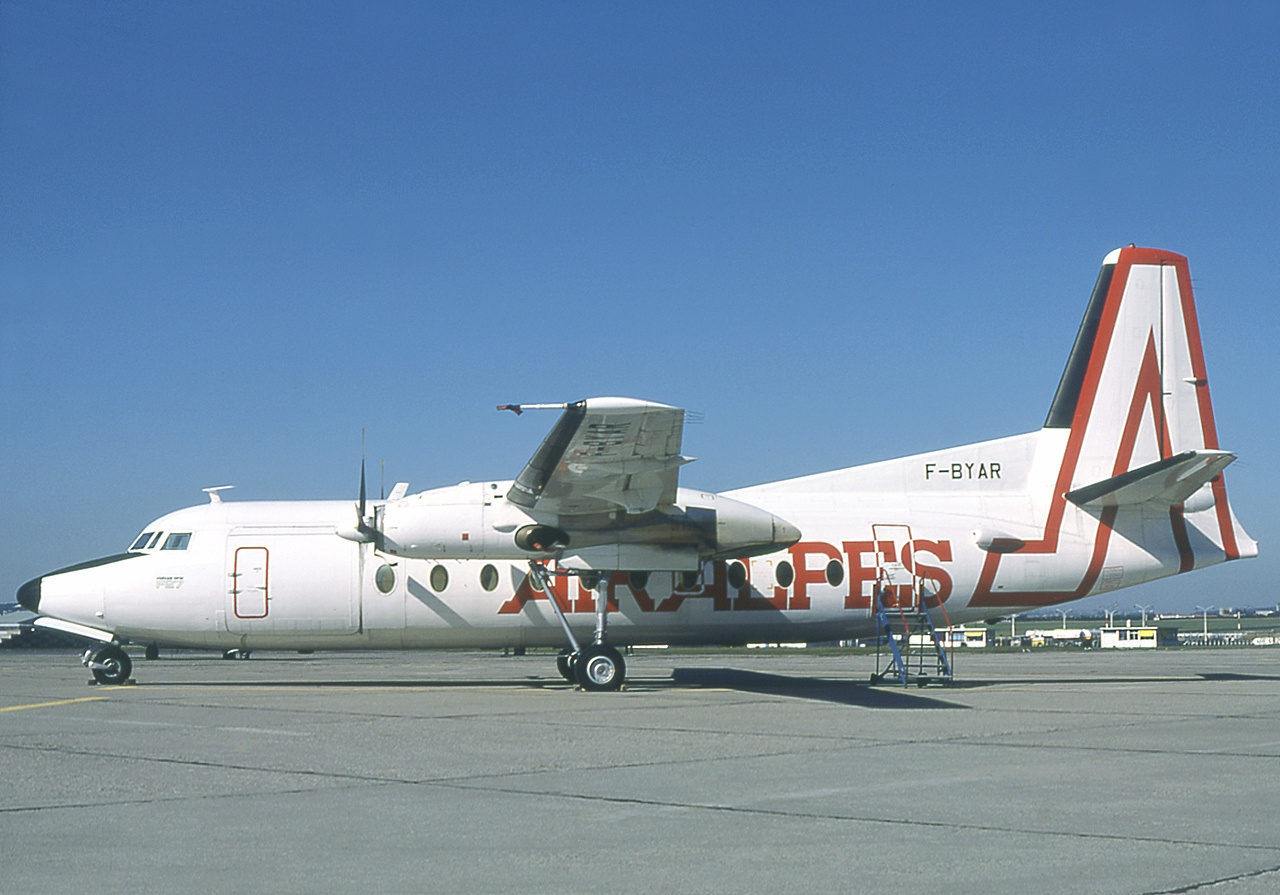
- Fokker F27-600
IATA	ICAO	Call sign
LP	ALP	AIRALPES
- Founded: 1961
- Ceased operations: 1981
- Headquarters: Chambéry Airport; Viviers-du-Lac, Savoie, France
- Key people: Michel Ziegler (founder)

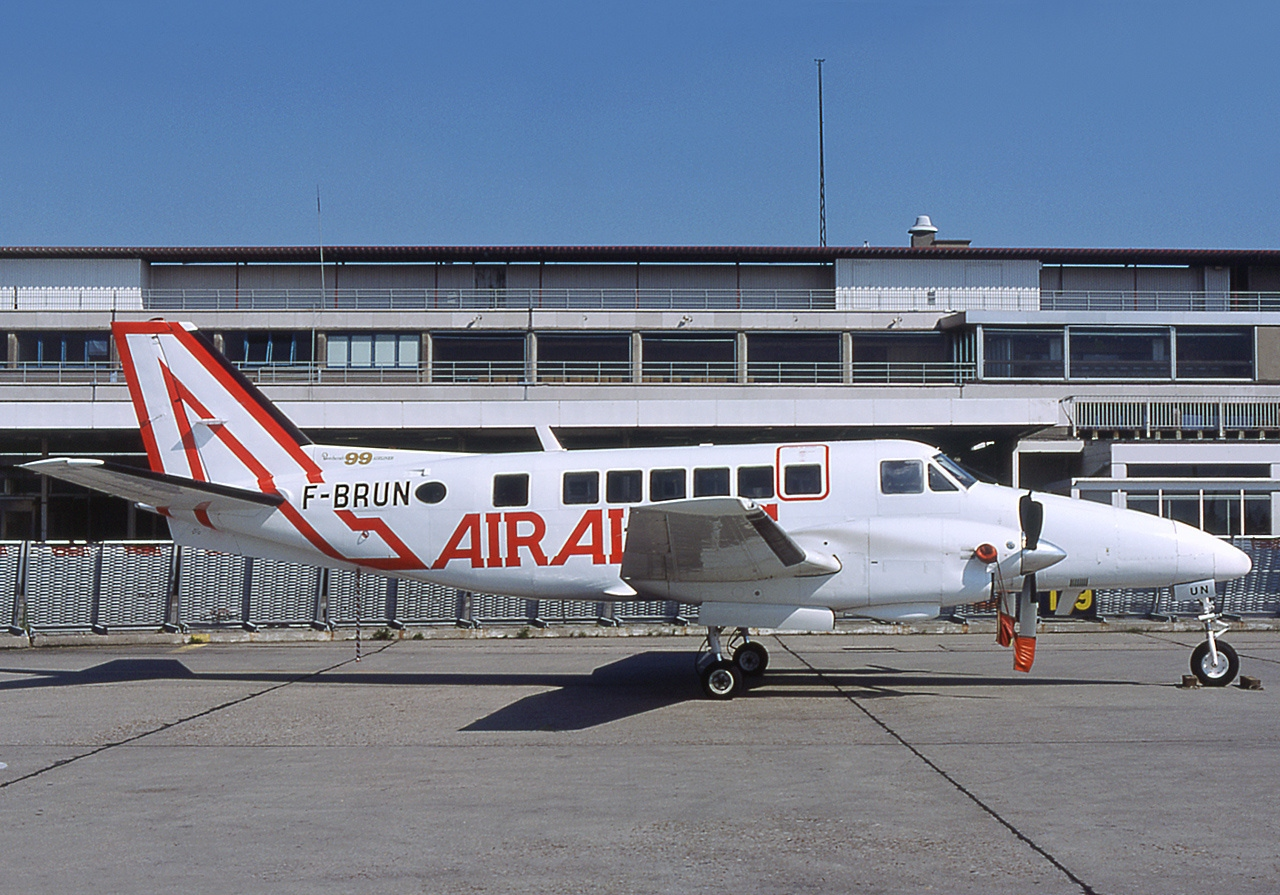
Beechcraft 99 in 1977

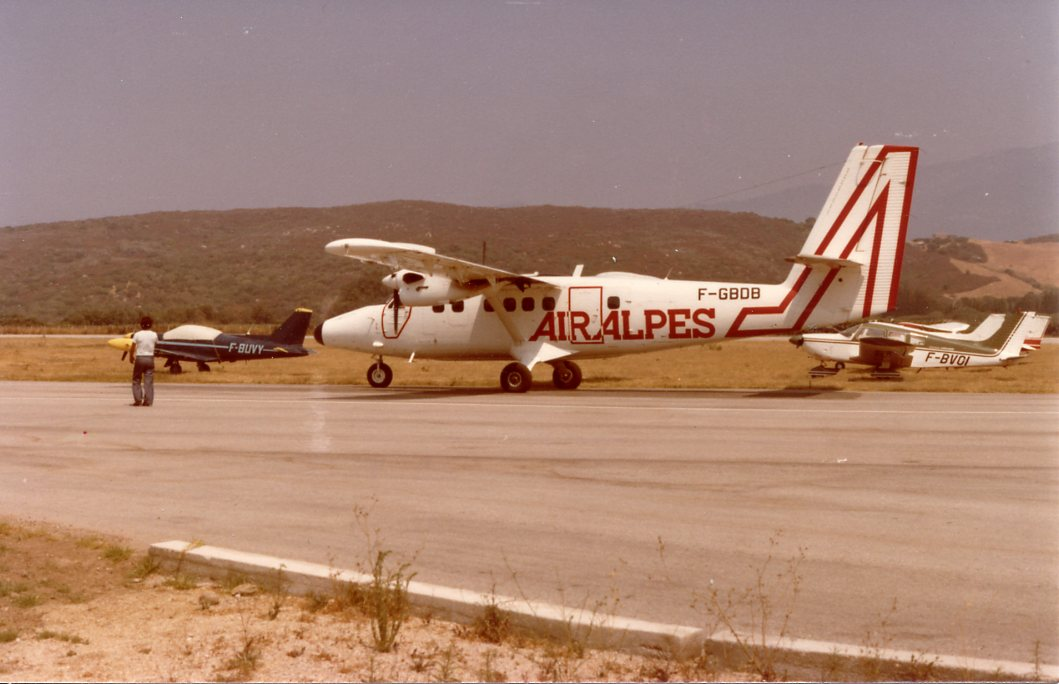
de Havilland Canada DHC-6 Twin Otter at Propriano airport (Corse)

Société Air Alpes was a French regional airline company based in Chambéry Airport and headquartered in Viviers-du-Lac, Savoie department. Established in 1961 by Michel Ziegler, the airline's history began in the French Alps.

== History ==
=== 1960s ===
Air Alpes was founded in 1961 by Michel Ziegler, with its first registered office at Chambéry Airport. He received backing from Henri Ziegler and Sylvain Floirat, who became the first two shareholders; followed later on by Joseph Szydlowski, the founder of aircraft engine manufacturer Turbomeca. Due to the construction of new facilities at Chambéry Airport, the registered office was transferred to Courchevel Airport. Operations started initially with a Piper PA-18 Super Cub, mainly offering flying lessons and carrying supplies into the mountains spots. A PC-6/340 Porter was leased, but on September 2, 1961, it was destroyed during a training flight at the "Col du Dome" in the Mont Blanc mountains. In 1962, a replacement turboprop Pilatus PC-6/A-H2 Porter was acquired.

Glacier skiing drop-offs were very important during the first years of Air Alpes' operation. The company built its own airstrips, called altiports at various high-altitude locations. Landings could only be achieved with guidance from the ground. A very close cooperation was established between the company and ski-instructors and guides from the various ski-resorts. So the main glaciers of Mont Blanc, the Tarentaise Valley, the Vanoise Massif and Oisans were accessible. For each flight only a maximum of six passenger and their guide could be accommodated. This activity ended in 1979 after a ban on glacier landings was imposed. In 1963, a second Pilatus PC-6/A-H2 joined the fleet and the company built an altiport at La Plagne. The first domestic seasonal routes were operated in Corsica island. In 1964, Megève Aerodrome was inaugurated on December 20. In November, a six-seat SFERMA SF-60 Marquis was leased for flights to Bron Airport close to Lyon city.

In 1967 an order was signed for the first de Havilland Canada DHC-6 Twin Otters and their deliveries were scheduled for October. The Twin Otter allowed winter operations into Courchevel Altiport as they could be duly equipped with skis. The Twin Otters were also used on Chambéry-Grenoble-Nice-Ajaccio route during the summer months.

In 1968 it was becoming apparent many smaller provincial towns wished to be connected directly to Paris by air. Among some of the smaller regional airlines that begun to fill this need were Rousseau Aviation, Touraine Air Transport (TAT), Air Paris and EAS Europe Airlines. In 1969, Air Alpes began linking Chambéry with Le Bourget Airport in Paris operating five daily flights Monday through Friday. Also in 1969, the first Beechcraft Model 99 15-seat turboprop aircraft joined the fleet. In 1970 Ziegler was prominent in establishing ATAR (Regional Air Transport Association), an association which comprised Air Alpes, Air Alsace, Air Aquitaine, Air Languedoc, Pyrenair, Air Rouergue, Air Antilles, Air Martinique and Guyane Air Transport. The association promoted the needs of its members in relation to the larger carriers such as Air France.

=== 1970s ===
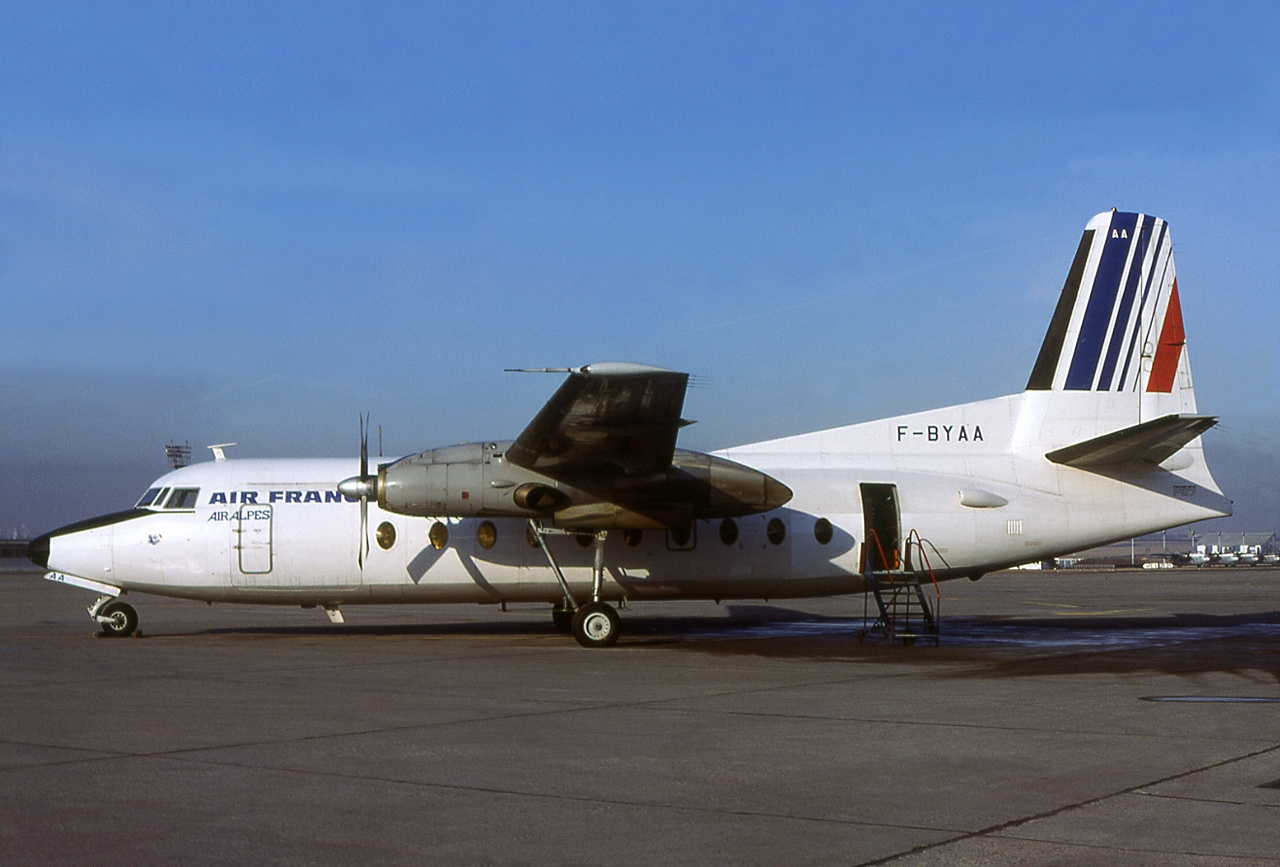
Fokker F27-400 operated on Air France behalf

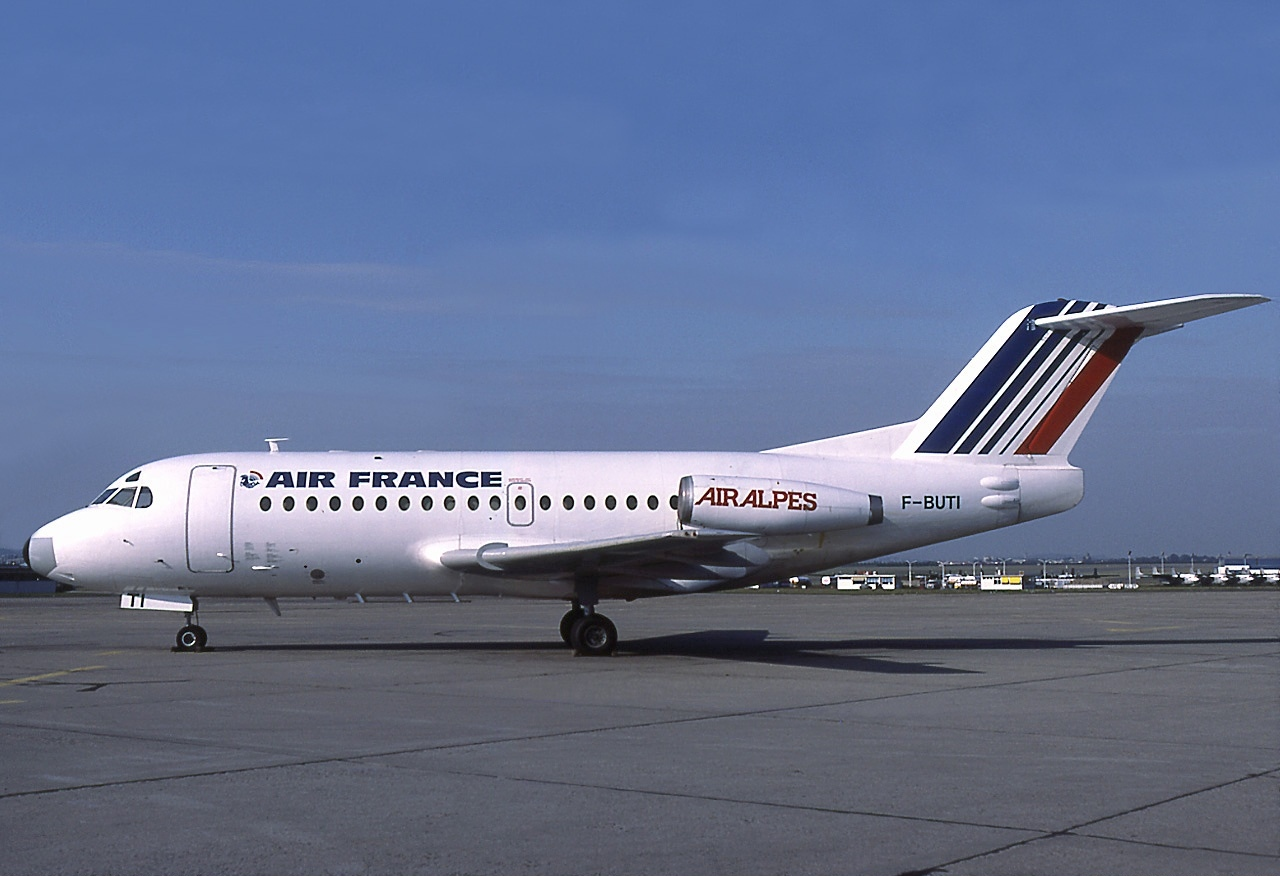
Fokker F28-1000 operated on Air France behalf

In April 1971 a Yakovlev Yak-40 was demonstrated to the airline, but no jets joined the fleet until 1974. In 1972 Air Alpes purchased 30% of Avi ALPI, an Italian air transport company based in Trento Northern Italy using a fleet of Piper and Pilatus light aircraft. Avi ALPI had been created by Aerosud and famed World War II pilot Martino Aichner. The same year saw operations commence on the Dole–Paris, and Paris/Geneva – Courchevel routes with Twin Otters. From 1972 Air Alpes was hosted on the Air France reservation system. The same year the GIECAR group (Groupement d'Intérêt Économique des Compagnies Aériennes Régionales) was created, leading to greater integration with Air France when agreements were forged to form a partnership between Air Limousin, Air Champagne Ardennes and Pyrenair, all flying on behalf of Air France. Courchevel–Paris, Courchevel–Geneva, Marseille–Milan, Marseille–Geneva, Marseille–Barcelonne, Marseille–Geneva and Metz–Düsseldorf services were operated using Air France-branded aircraft. By the end of 1973 Air Alpes was flying 50 routes; including Air France/Air Alpes routes and flights jointly marketed by the two airlines. Further agreements with other larger airlines such as Union des Transports Aériens for the Savoie and Haute-Savoie regions and Pan American World Airways were also made.

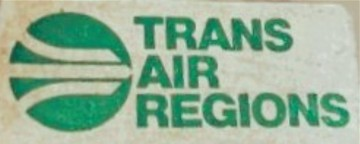

The association with Air France prompted the decision to place orders for four Aérospatiale Corvette short range business- and regional jets, with options for eight more; and in 1974 Air Alpes entered the jet age with the arrival of the first Corvette; operations commenced on September 28 flying in the full colors of Air France upon the Chambéry–Paris route. Also in 1974 Air Alpes acquired Air Champagne Ardennes soon after its operational association with ALTA-Air Limousin, Air Rouergue and Pyrénair. The number of aircraft continued to increase with the arrival of a Cessna 401, a Cessna 402 and a Cessna 411 with the takeover of these companies. In October 1975 the first of two Fokker F27 Friendship turboprops arrived. The first F27 route was Chambéry to Paris, the same route initiated by the Corvettes a year earlier.

In 1976 Air Alpes unveiled a new logo for its aircraft and the company. While the majority of the stock remained in the hands of the Ziegler family and Mr. Sylvain Floirat, two new shareholders took part ownership, the chambers of commerce and industry of Savoie and Haute Savoie. By 1977 operating the Corvettes proved not to be financially viable for Air Alpes and the four aircraft were withdrawn from the fleet. The added financing by the Chamber of Commerce groups was insufficient and the group TAG Techniques d'Avant Garde became the main shareholder of Air Alpes, with a recovery package put into place after the realization that a number of routes were not profitable. Additional recovery plans led to operations ceasing on several routes, including Chambéry – Grenoble – St. Etienne – Toulouse and Grenoble-Metz; along with the cancellation of a contract for Air Inter to perform major maintenance/overhaul of the Fokker F27s flown by Air Alpes.

In April 1979 the first of a fleet of Fokker F28 Fellowship twinjets arrived. The Fokker F28, equipped with 65 seats, replaced the F27s on the Chambéry to Paris route. Air Alpes also inaugurated the Paris to Figari Southern Corsica route with the delivery of two more F28s which followed a short time later. The F28 fleet complemented the F27s and this fleet continued to grow during 1980 as more F27s and a Fairchild Hiller FH-227 were delivered.

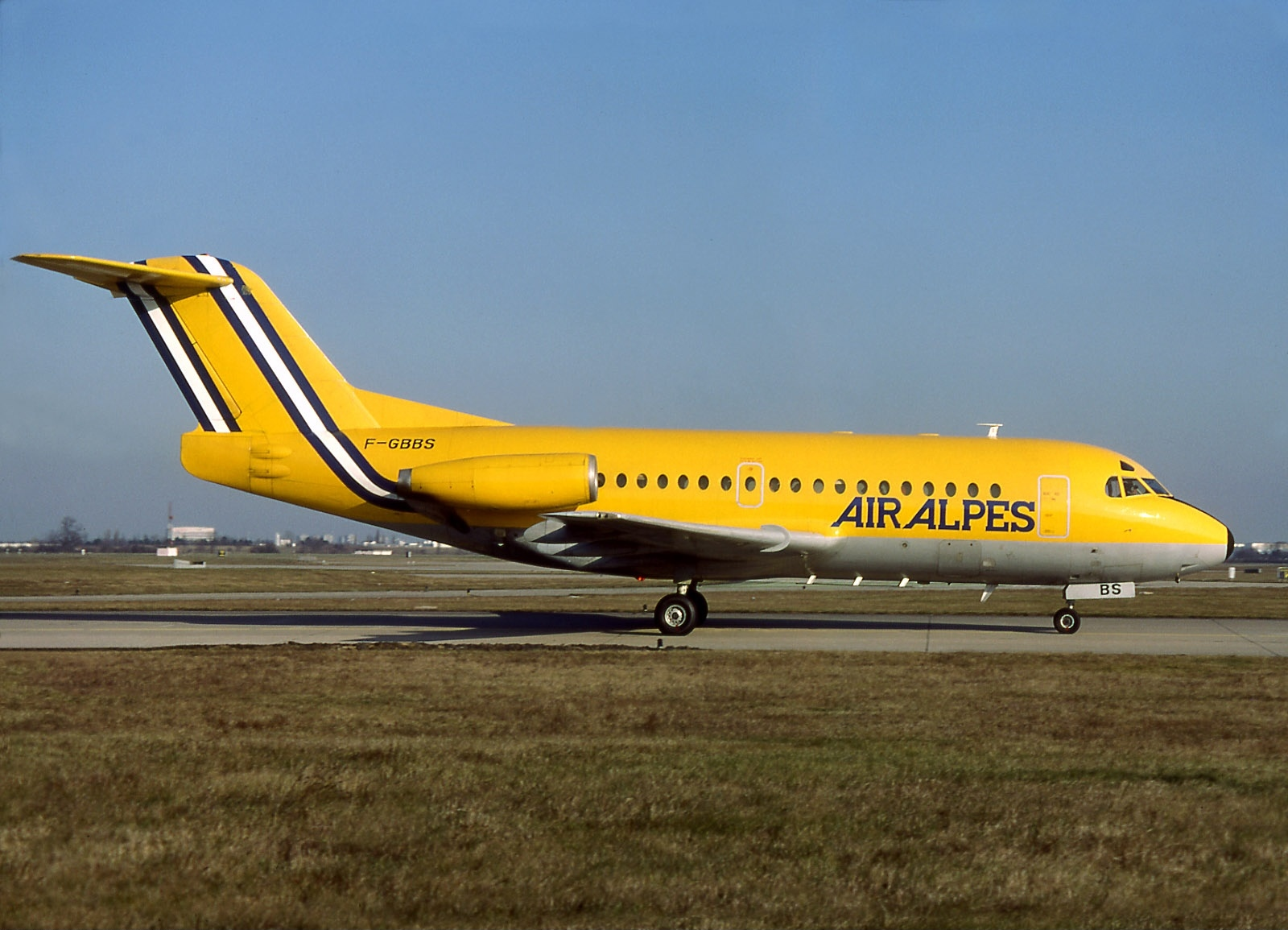
Fokker F28-1000 already in full TAT European Airlines colors

=== 1980s ===
On July 3, 1980, an agreement was signed with (TAT European Airlines) (which had acquired a majority shareholding in the previous year) for the two companies to share sales, office functions and services. The agreement led to reductions in the F28 and F27 fleet, while two McDonnell Douglas DC-9s were leased in the following year. In 1981 TAT acquired over 75% of Air Alpes' shares and Air Alpes operations were fully integrated in Autumn.

== Incidents and accidents ==
- 2 September 1961, Pilatus destroyed during a training flight.
- 15 January 1970, Beech 99 F-BRUF lands short of the runway at Chambéry- Aix-les-Bains Airport. All passengers and crew were safe, and sound but the aircraft was destroyed. Following this accident, the Chambéry-Aix-les-Bains airport (Chambéry Airport) will be equipped with an ILS (Instrument Landing System) to allow the security and reliability of the flights. This had been requested by Air Alpes previously for a long time.
- 1970, A DHC-6 Twin Otter is damaged during a training flight at the Courchevel Altiport
