= Flight 230 =

Flight 230 may refer to:

- Aeroméxico Flight 230, crashed on 27 July 1981
- TAT Flight 230, crashed on 4 March 1988
