= Aérospatiale Corvette =

1970s French business jet

SN 601 Corvette
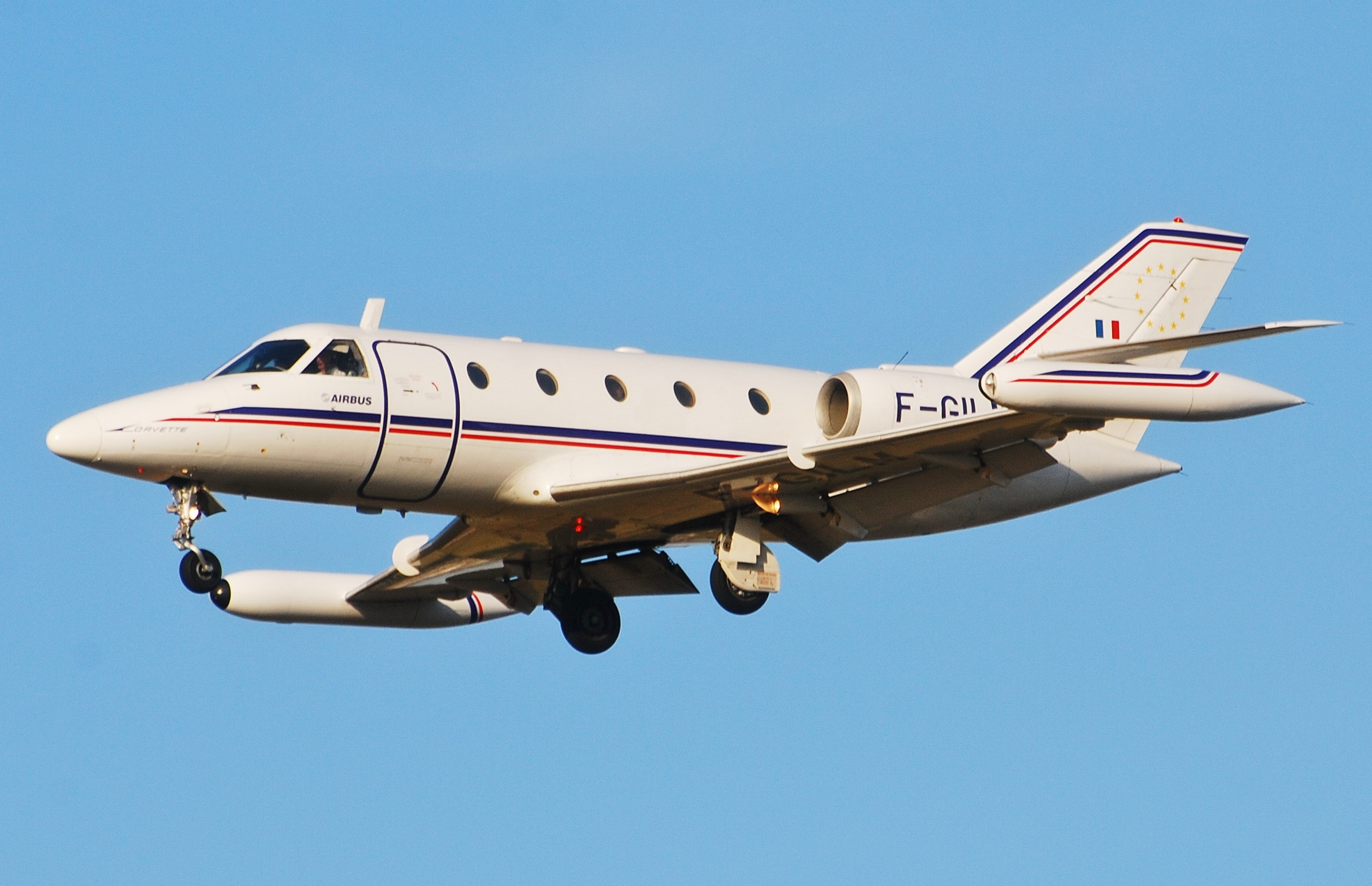
- Aérospatiale Corvette

General information
- Type: Business jet/Regional jet airliner
- National origin: France
- Manufacturer: Aérospatiale
- Number built: 40

History
- Manufactured: 1974–1977
- First flight: 16 July 1970

The Aérospatiale SN 601 Corvette is a French business jet of the early 1970s developed and manufactured by aerospace manufacturer Aérospatiale. Sales of the type were disappointing, leading to only 40 Corvettes being constructed, including the prototypes, prior to production being terminated.

In response to an open request by the French government for a compact twin-turbofan engine-equipped liaison/trainer aircraft, aircraft manufacturers Sud Aviation and Nord Aviation decided to embark upon development of a new business jet that could also fulfil the government demand as well. The joint venture's design, initially designated as the SN 600 Diplomate, was first publicly displayed at the 1968 Hanover ILA Air Show. On 16 July 1970, the prototype SN 600 performed the type's maiden flight; on 23 March 1971, this prototype was lost during a test flight. A pair of improved SN 601 prototypes were then constructed; on 20 December 1972, the first of these prototypes conducted its first flight.

In addition to its use as a VIP aircraft, a number of Corvettes were procured and operated by regional airlines, such as Air Alsace, Air Alpes, Air Champagne, TAT, and Sterling Airways. Airbus Industrie also operated a small fleet of Corvettes for internal transportation of staff between its key sites across Europe. During late 1976, Aerospatiale, as a consequence of a low number of orders having been received during three years of production, decided to terminate production of the SN 601 Corvette. While an expanded model, known as the Corvette 200, had been actively studied, development was abandoned following the end of manufacture.

== Design and development ==
=== Origins ===
During the 1950s and 1960s, the French government, which had taken a significant interest in the re-establishment and growth of its national aviation industries in the aftermath of the Second World War, developed a detailed request for a combined liaison/trainer aircraft, to be equipped with twin-turbofan engines. Among those companies that took interest in the government request were aircraft manufacturers Sud Aviation and Nord Aviation. Design work on such an aircraft commenced during the second half of the 1960s as a joint venture between Sud and Nord. In January 1968, Sud and Nord decided to proceed with the programme following an announcement by French engine company SNECMA announced that it was developing a suitable engine, the M49 Larzac. It was a conventional design for its class, a low-wing monoplane powered by a pair of turbofan engines, which were mounted upon nacelles attached to the rear fuselage.

The joint venture's design, designated as the SN 600, was first revealed to the public as a scale model, described as the SN 600 Diplomate, which was displayed at the 1968 Hanover ILA Air Show. The reveal roughly aligned with that of a reasonably comparable aircraft, the Cessna Citation 500. While frequently contrasted with the Citation 500, the SN 600 is a larger aircraft capable of carrying more passengers, being equipped with swept wings, and was envisioned to be cheaper during its launch year. The joint venture's own forecasts for the SN 600 included, beyond an anticipated order from the French military services for 60 aircraft, a minimum of 400 of the type which were to be sold upon the global market of an anticipated demand for such a class of aircraft between 1974 and 1980 of 2,800 business jets.

From a marketing perspective, the joint venture held ambitions to sell the type worldwide, particularly the North American market in which there was already an established demand for business jets; accordingly, elements of the in-development aircraft were refined towards appealing to American customers. A high-profile competitor to the SN 600 was in fact another French-built business jet, the Dassault Falcon 20, that was developed by rival manufacturer Dassault Aviation. According to aerospace publication Flying Magazine, the competing Falcon 20 appeared to have gained the upper hand in the North American market over the joint venture by 1973, having gained the backing of American airliner Pan American World Airways to act as a distributor for the type. Years of discussions were held with the aim of securing a North American distributor to market the SN 600. At one point, a distributor arrangement was formed with conglomerate Ling-Temco-Vought (LTV) and subsequently with manufacturer Piper Aircraft.

During 1970, Sud and Nord merged to form Aerospatiale, who continued work on the SN 600. The company was keen to promote the advantages of the design, observing the SN 600 to offer well below average operating costs, being better within its size range than any other turbojet-powered competitor along with some turboprop-powered designs as well. Furthermore, it was promoted as being a spacious and flexible aircraft that satisfied the needs of commuter airlines. On 16 July 1970, the prototype SN 600, powered by a pair of Pratt & Whitney Canada JT15D engines installed, performed its maiden flight. However, the intended Larzac engine was never fitted to the prototype, having still been in development for over a year after the loss of the prototype, which had crashed during a test flight intended to explore the aircraft's stall characteristics on 23 March 1971. The loss of the prototype, while quickly resolved from a technical perspective, has been claimed to have badly shaken the faith of prospective customers in the type.

=== Redesign and disorder ===
Following the loss of the SN 600, a pair of improved SN 601 prototypes were constructed, which were shortly thereafter renamed as the Corvette 100. The SN 601 featured a stretched fuselage, 3 ft 5½ in (1.05 m) longer than the 41 ft 11½ (12.79 m) in counterpart used on the earlier SN 600. On 20 December 1972, the first SN 601 flew for the first time. Early flight tests found that the type still suffered from unfavourable stall characteristics. By this point, the Corvette programme was three years behind the rival Citation 500 business jet, despite the two aircraft being originally revealed within months of one another. The French government had become sceptical of the programme's slow progress, to the point where, during 1974, the abandonment of work on the Corvette was seriously considered.

During 1973, U.S. Corvette Incorporated, a dedicated North American-based distributor, was established in Atlanta, Georgia to act as a sales and aircraft completion center for the region. At this point, Aérospatiale was still circulating optimistic sales projects for the type, anticipating the delivery of 10 Corvettes to the North American market during 1974, along with 25 aircraft in 1975 and 35 more during 1976; this was despite being nearly a third more expensive than American rivals such as the Citation 500 and Learjet 24D. Additionally, deliveries were scheduled to commence during March 1974, even as it was increasingly clear from flight tests that modifications were required. Less than a year later, the U.S. Corvette Inc. initiative was abandoned prior to any deliveries; it was replaced by an exclusive distributor arrangement with Oklahoma-based company Air Center Inc. Shortly thereafter, a new management team arrived at Aérospatiale in response to cost overruns on both the Corvette and Concorde programmes.

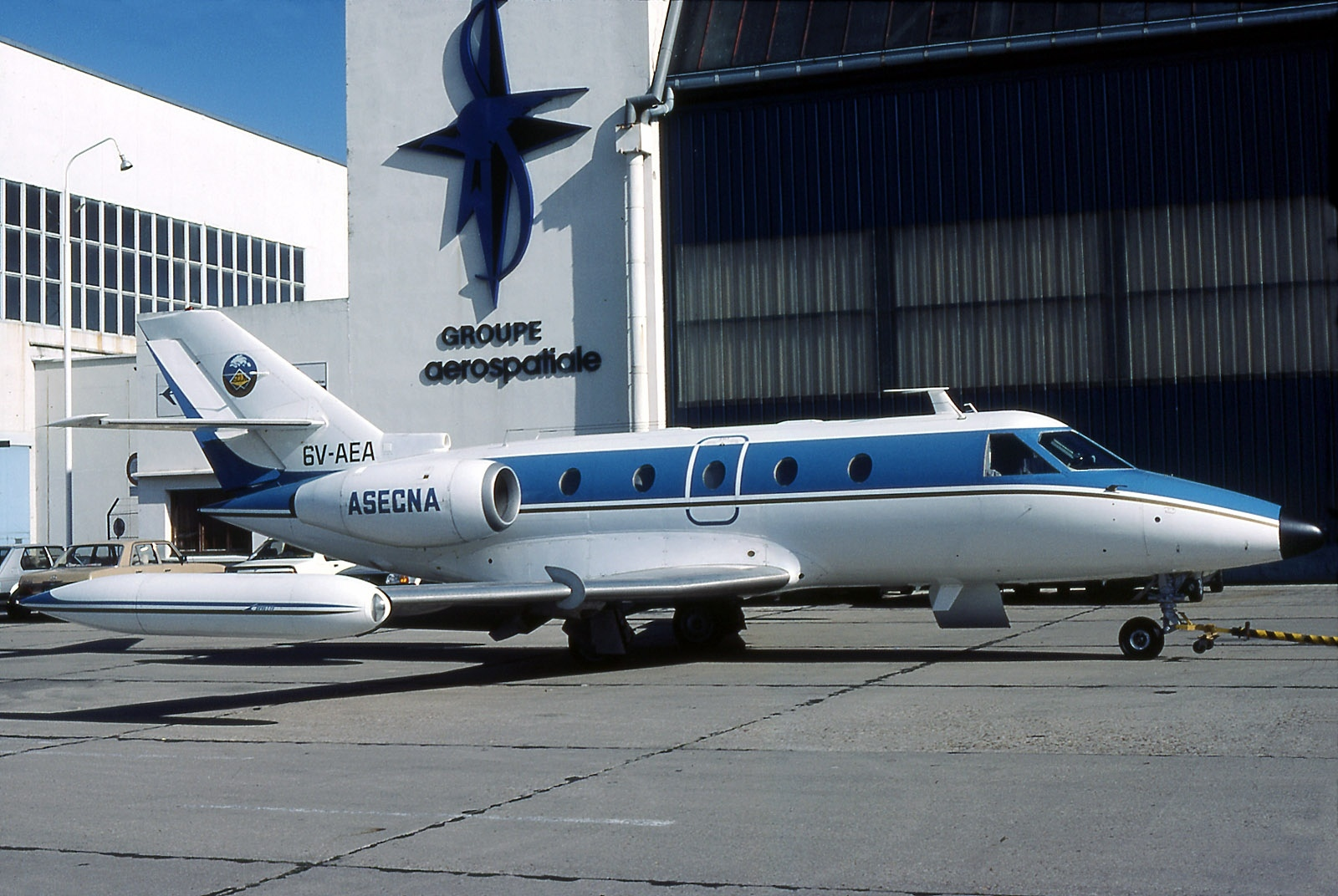
A Corvette, September 1983

In May 1974, an airworthiness certificate for the Corvette was awarded by French authorities. However, deliveries were delayed until early 1974, partially as a result of industrial action at engine manufacturer United Aircraft of Canada. In response to the lack of deliveries, Air Center Inc. sued Aérospatiale for non-performance, having only received a single non-certified demonstrator aircraft out of a contracted fleet of 70 production Corvettes which had been due to be delivered by May 1974. Ultimately, only six new Corvettes would be dispatched to Oklahoma, and there would be no sales of the type during or after 1975; in March 1976, the U.S. marketing programme was terminated by Aérospatiale.

During late 1976, Aérospatiale decided to cease manufacture of the Corvette as a consequence of the company having only received orders for 27 production models during the two-and-a-half years following the aircraft's receipt of type certification against hopes that it would be able to sell six Corvettes per month. A report produced by the French government's Court of Audit found that losses accumulated by the Corvette programme amounted to roughly $190 million, or 66 per cent of Aerospatiale's fiscal deficits from 1972 to 1975. The same report noted that the company's management had lacked real appreciation of the risks involved in such a hotly competed niche role from existing British, American and French (the latter being in the form of Dassault Aviation's Falcon 20), and stated that: "It is certain that the Corvette programme is, and will remain, a major commercial and financial disaster".

Aérospatiale had conducted a design study into a prospective improved version of the aircraft, which was referred to as the Corvette 200. If developed as intended, this model would to have featured a further fuselage stretch which would have allowed it to accommodate up to 18 seats; however, production of the Corvette had been terminated prior to any having been constructed.

== Operational history ==
A number of Corvettes were sold and operated by several French regional airlines, such as Air Alsace, Air Alpes, Air Champagne and TAT. Sterling Airways of Denmark was another airliner that also operated the type. One Corvette was used as a VIP transport by the Congolese Air Force. By January 2009, a small number of Corvettes remained active in Europe and Africa, including one (F-GPLA cn 28) in France that had been fitted out for aerial photography missions. This Corvette was later used during high speed tests of the TGV high speed train, serving as a chase aircraft.

Airbus Industrie operated a fleet of five Corvettes for internal transportation purposes between 1981 and 2009.

== Variants ==
SN 600
The first Corvette prototype, powered by two 2,200 lbf (9.8 kN) thrust Pratt & Whitney Canada JT15D-1 turbofan engines.

SN 601
Production version with longer fuselage than SN 600 and 2,500 lb (11.10004 kN) thrust JT15D-4 engines. 39 built, including two prototypes.

== Operators ==
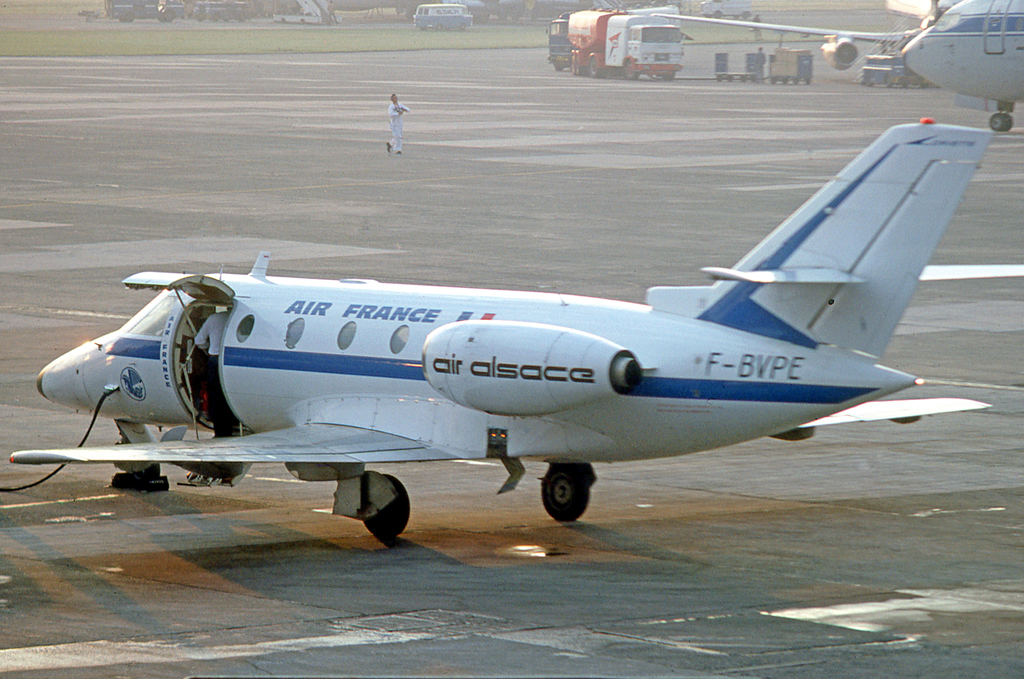
An Air Alsace Corvette, 1977

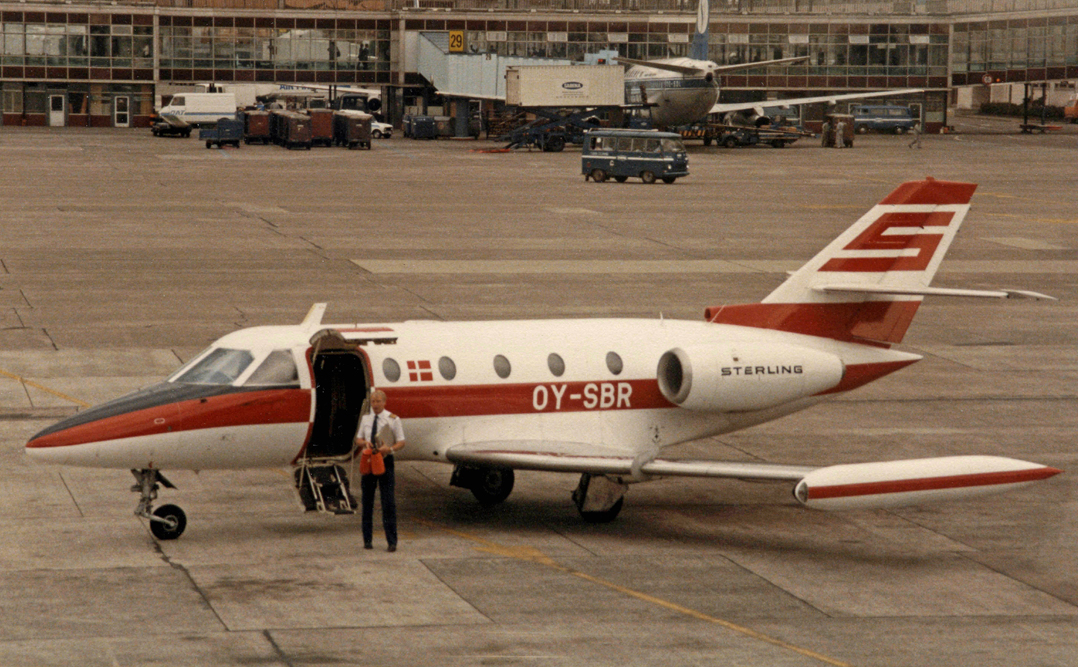
A Sterling Airways Corvette at Brussels Airport, 1985

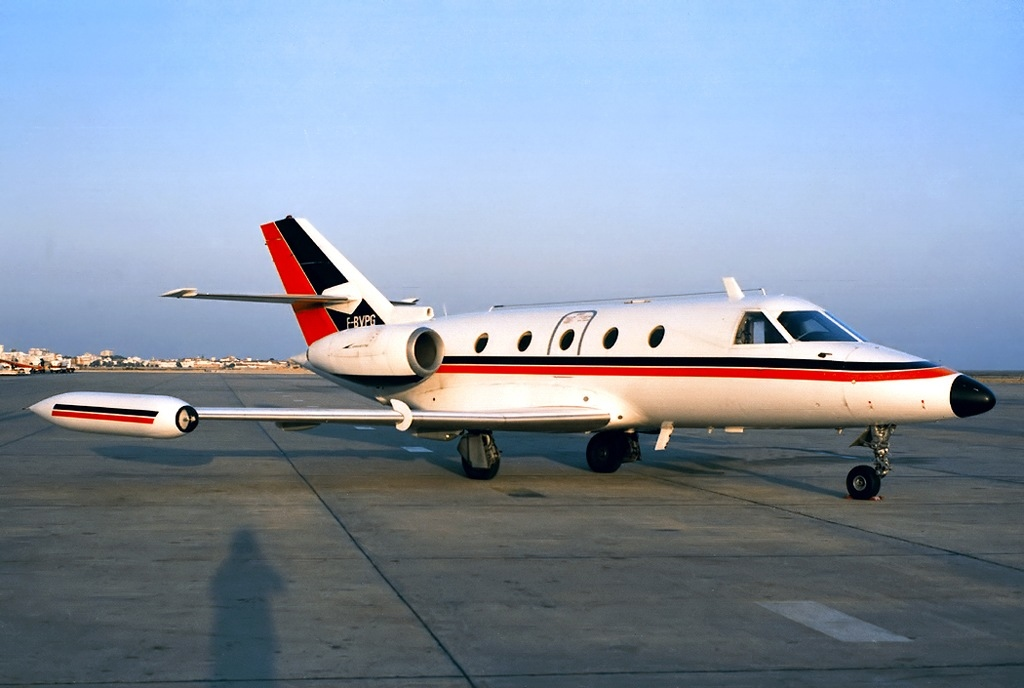
A Uni Air Corvette

=== Aerospatiale SN-601 Corvette ===
Benin

- Air Benin
- Force Aerienne Populaire de Benin

Republic of the Congo

- Aero Service

Denmark

- Aalborg Airtaxi
- North Flying AS
- Sterling Airways
- Air Marine

Spain

- Drenair
- Gestair Executive Jet
- Teire S.A.
- Mayoral
- Aeropublic

France

- Aero Vision
- Air Alpes
- Air Alsace
- Airbus Industrie
- Continentale Air Service
- Eurocopter
- Gallic Aviation
- Musee de l'Air et de l'Espace
- TAT European Airlines
- TAT Transport Aerien Transregional
- Uni-Air

Mali

- Republic of Mali Air Force.

United States

- Air National Aircraft Sales & Service Inc.
- Midwest Air Charter

Netherlands

- Jetstar Holland

Libya

- Libyan Air Ambulance

Gabon

- Air Inter Gabon

Madagascar

- Aeromarine

Sweden

- Baltic Aviation Inc.

== Accidents ==
Including the prototype SN 600, a total of eight Corvettes are recorded as having been written-off in crashes. The worst loss of life in a Corvette crash was on 3 September 1979, when an SN 601 of Sterling Airways crashed in the Mediterranean Sea off Nice following a double engine failure. All ten occupants were killed.

== Specifications (SN 601) ==
Data from Jane's All The World's Aircraft 1976-77

General characteristics

- Crew: 1–2
- Capacity: 6 to 14 passengers, depending on configuration
- Length: 13.83 m (45 ft 4 in)
- Wingspan: 12.87 m (42 ft 3 in)
- Height: 4.23 m (13 ft 11 in)
- Wing area: 22.00 m^{2} (236.8 sq ft)
- Aspect ratio: 7.45:1
- Empty weight: 3,510 kg (7,738 lb)
- Max takeoff weight: 6,600 kg (14,551 lb)
- Fuel capacity: 1,660 L (440 US gal; 370 imp gal) normal, additional 700 L (180 US gal; 150 imp gal) in optional tip tanks
- Powerplant: 2 × Pratt & Whitney Canada JT15D-4 turbofans, 11 kN (2,500 lbf) thrust each

Performance

- Maximum speed: 760 km/h (470 mph, 410 kn) at 9,000 m (30,000 ft) (max cruise)
- Cruise speed: 566 km/h (352 mph, 306 kn) (econ. cruise)
- Stall speed: 168 km/h (104 mph, 91 kn) (wheels and flaps down)
- Range: 2,555 km (1,588 mi, 1,380 nmi) (econ cruise power, with tip tanks, 45 min reserves)
- Service ceiling: 12,500 m (41,000 ft)
- Rate of climb: 14 m/s (2,700 ft/min)

== See also ==
Aircraft of comparable role, configuration, and era

- Cessna Citation II
- Dassault Falcon 10
- HFB 320 Hansa Jet
- Learjet 23

Related lists

- List of civil aircraft
