= Tat language =

Tat language may refer to the following:

- Tat language (Caucasus) in Dagestan and Azerbaijan, a southwestern Iranian language, closely related to Persian
- Tati (Iran), a group of Northwestern Iranian dialects, including Takestani, closely related to Talysh language

== See also ==
- Tati language (disambiguation)
