= Air Alsace =

French regional airline (1962–1981)

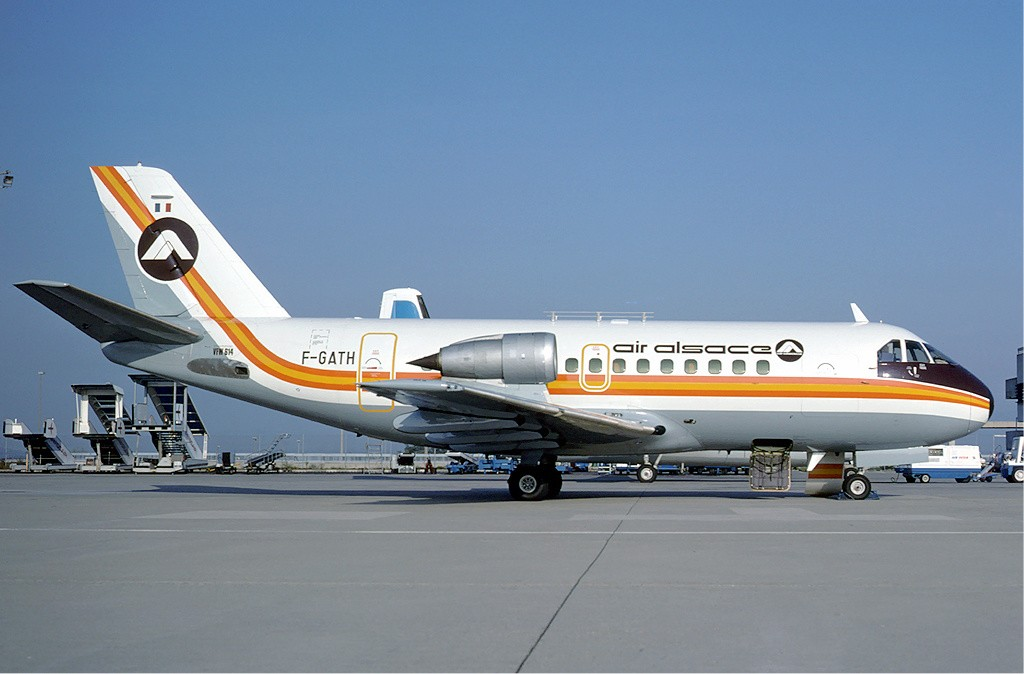
- VFW-Fokker 614
- Commenced operations: 1962
- Ceased operations: 1981
- Operating bases: Colmar-Houssen Aerodrome
- Headquarters: Colmar, France
- Key people: Jean Risser (CEO)
- Employees: 220 (1982)

Société Air Alsace S.A. was a regional airline with headquarters at Colmar-Houssen Aerodrome, close to Colmar city, France.

== History ==
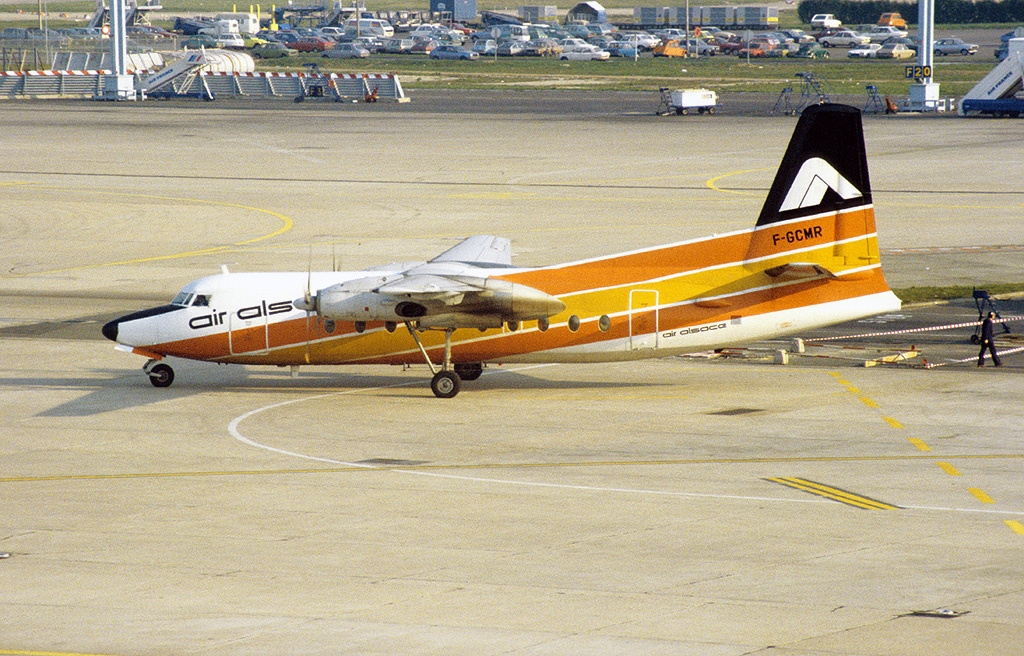
Fokker F.27 Friendship

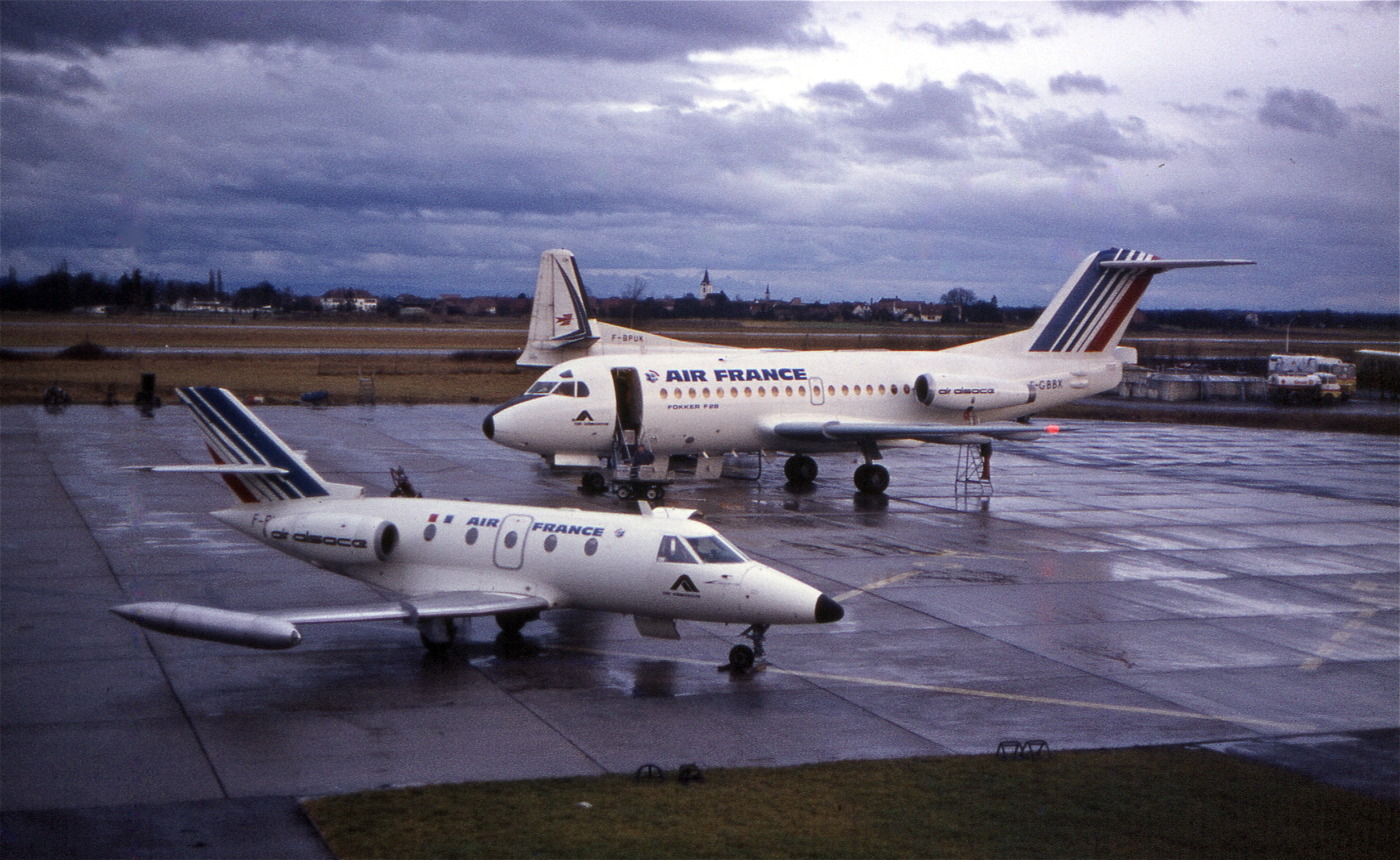
Aérospatiale Corvette and Fokker F.28 Fellowship in full Air France colors

Air Alsace was established in August 1962 and began air taxi operations from Colmar-Houssen Aerodrome airport later on in that same year using two Piper Navajo light aircraft. From June 1974 it began to operate passenger scheduled routes. In March 1975 it took over small air carrier Air Vosges and its fleet of Cessna 401 and Cessna 402 twin engine prop aircraft.

The growth in traffic and destinations required the adoption of larger and longer-range aircraft such as the Nord 262 and the Fokker F.27 Friendship twin turboprops. The next step was the adoption of jetliners, starting from the small Aérospatiale Corvette to the more capacious VFW-Fokker 614 in April 1976 and the even the larger Fokker F.28 Fellowship.

The growth of the airline attracted the attention of Air France on whose behalf services to Amsterdam, Brussels, Cologne, Rome and Strasbourg were started. Flights to London Gatwick and Milan were later added. However, the financial results were not positive and the airline decided to rely on a more solid partner - TAT - Touraine Air Transport - which acquired the majority shareholding at the beginning of 1981. Despite this, Air Alsace ceased operations during the following year.

== Fleet ==
Over the years, the fleet of Air Alsace was the Fokker F27 Friendship, Fokker F28 Fellowship, Aérospatiale Corvette, Piper PA-31 Navajo, Cessna 402, Aérospatiale N 262 and VFW-Fokker 614.
