= Tours Val de Loire Airport =

Tours Val de Loire Airport Aéroport Tours Val de Loire Base Aérienne 604 Tours Val de Loire
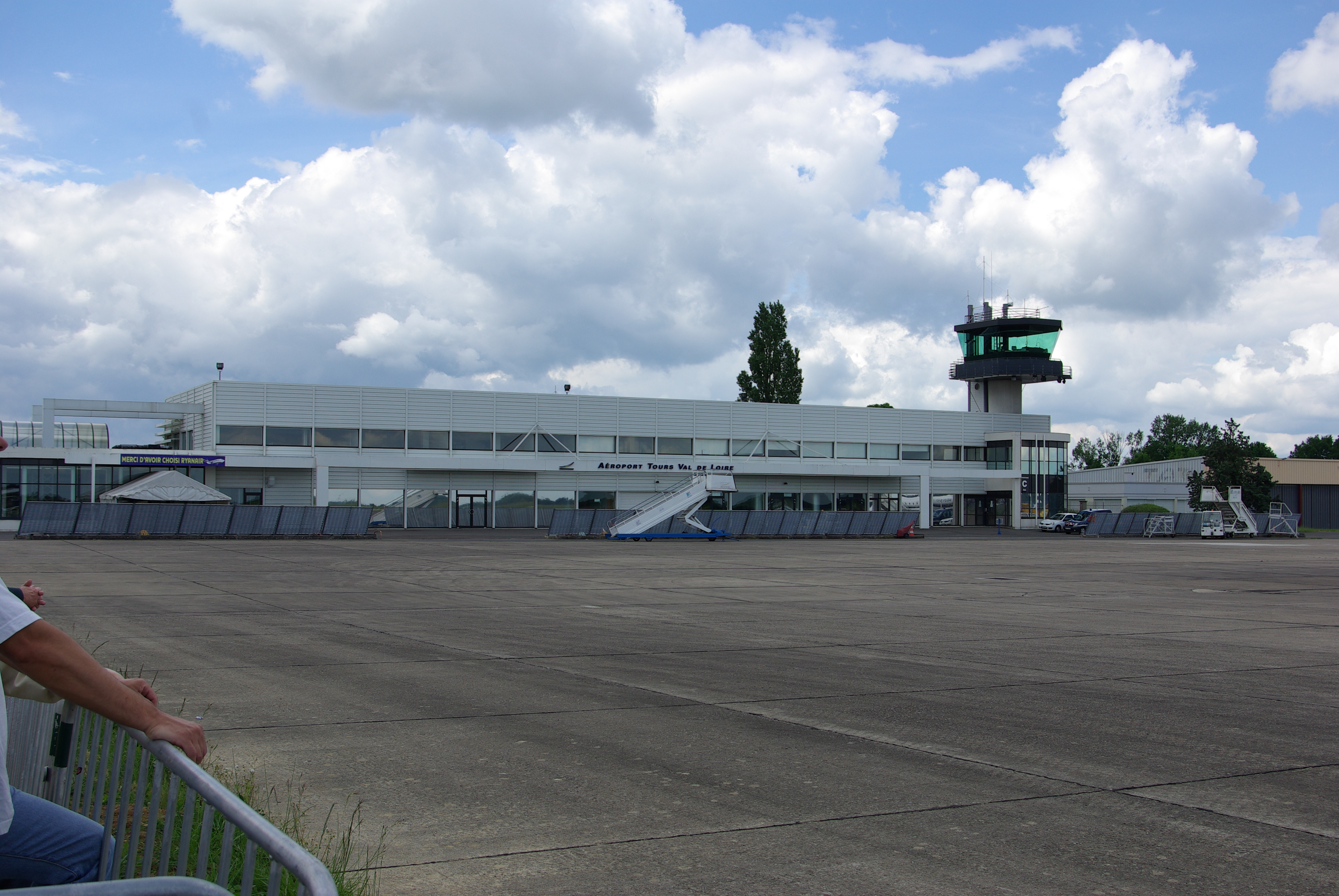
- IATA: TUF; ICAO: LFOT

Summary
- Airport type: Public / military
- Operator: Ministère de la Défense (FASF)
- Serves: Tours, France
- Elevation AMSL: 357 ft (109 m)
- Coordinates: 47°25′55″N 000°43′23″E
- Website: www.tours.aeroport.fr

Map
- Location of airport in Centre-Val de Loire region LFOT (France)

Runways
Direction	Length		Surface
Direction	m	ft	Surface
02/20	2,404	7,887	Concrete

Statistics (2025)
- Passengers: 187,834
- Passenger change 24-25: ▼1%

Tours Val de Loire Airport (French: Aéroport Tours-Val de Loire) (IATA: TUF, ICAO: LFOT) is an airport on the outskirts of Tours, in the Loire Valley, France. It is in the French department of Indre-et-Loire, 5 km (2.7 NM) north-northeast of the city centre. The airport is located partly on the territory of the communes of Tours and Parçay-Meslay.

The airport is open to both national and international carriers, private planes and is certified for both instrument flight and visual flight.

== History ==
The airport dates back to World War I, being established as a French Air Force (Armee de l'Air) training center. The center trained many French aviators and some Americans who had volunteered prior to the American entry in the war into the French flying service. In the summer of 1917, the school was provided to the American Expeditionary Forces, which designated the school as the Second Aviation Instructional Center, Tours Aerodrome. Initially it was used as an advanced training school for pursuit pilot combat training. Later it developed into a center of training for all aerial observers of the Air Service, United States Army assigned to the AEF. It also was used as a radio school, a photographic school and an aerial gunnery school. After the 1918 Armistice with Germany, it was returned to the French Air Force which used it as a military base.

After World War II the airport was used by NATO and the US Air Force before becoming a flying school in the 1950s. From the early 1960s, Tours Airport was opened to the public. During the end of the 1970s the airport enjoyed a golden period due to the local airline Touraine Air Transport (TAT), but that airline suffered a slow slump, from which the airport never really recovered until the late 1990s, when it received subventions by the Conseil Général.

== Facilities ==
The airport resides at an elevation of 109 metres (358 ft) above mean sea level. It has one paved runway designated 02/20 which measures 2,404 by 45 metres (7,887 ft × 148 ft). The airport once housed the head office of TAT European Airlines.

There is no longer a shuttle service to the airport, and it is not served by the Fil Bleu city bus service. However, the Vaucanson tram stop, around 850 metres away, is accessible by foot.

== Airlines and destinations ==
The following airlines operate regular scheduled and charter flights at Tours Val de Loire Airport:

Airlines	Destinations
Aer Lingus	Seasonal: Dublin
Ryanair	Marrakesh, Porto; Seasonal: London–Stansted, Marseille
