= Taty =

Taty may refer to:

== People ==
=== Names ===
- Anastasia (given name), nicknamed "Taty"
- Tatiana (given name), nicknamed "Taty"

=== Given name, nickname ===
- Taty (footballer) (born 1996), Tatiely Cristina Sena das Neves, Brazilian women's footballer
- Taty Almeida (1930–2026), Argentine teacher and human rights activist
- Taty Forbes (born 1997), American softball player
- Taty Mbungu (born 1954), Congolese footballer
- Taty Sumirah (1952–2020), Indonesian badminton player

=== Surname ===
- Nilson Taty (born 1987), São Toméan footballer

=== Other people ===
- Tạ Tỵ (1922–2004), Vietnamese artist

== Music ==
- t.A.T.u. (1999–2011; Russian: Тату, lit. 'tattoo', also romanized Tatu), Russian girl band duo, who uses taty.ru
- Taty (song), 2015 single by Markus Riva

== Other uses ==
- Vizier (Ancient Egypt) (Ancient Egyptian: G47 t Z1 A1 romanized tjaty or taty
- Setipinna taty (S. taty), a species of anchovy

== See also ==
- Taytay (disambiguation)
