= Tropine acyltransferase =

Identifiers
- EC no.: 2.3.1.185
- CAS no.: 162535-29-7&title= 138440-79-6, 162535-29-7

Databases
- BRENDA: enzyme data
- ExPASy: NiceZyme view
- KEGG: enzyme entry
- MetaCyc: metabolic pathway
- Rhea: reactions
- PDB structures: RCSB PDB PDBe PDBsum
Search
- PMC: articles
- PubMed: articles
- NCBI: proteins

Tropine acyltransferase (EC 2.3.1.185, tropine:acyl-CoA transferase, acetyl-CoA:tropan-3-ol acyltransferase, tropine acetyltransferase, tropine tigloyltransferase, TAT) is an enzyme with systematic name acyl-CoA:tropine O-acyltransferase. This enzyme catalyses the following chemical reaction

acyl-CoA + tropine $\rightleftharpoons$ CoA + O-acyltropine

This enzyme exhibits absolute specificity for the endo/3alpha configuration found in tropine as pseudotropine.
