= Tati language =

Tati language may refer to:

- Tat language (Caucasus), a language from the eastern Caucasus
- Judeo-Tat, dialect of the Mountain Jews, also called Tati
- Tati language (Iran), a language from Iran

== See also ==
- Tat language (disambiguation)
