= TAT Flight 230 =

1988 aviation accident in France

Coordinates: 48.4490°N 2.8423°E

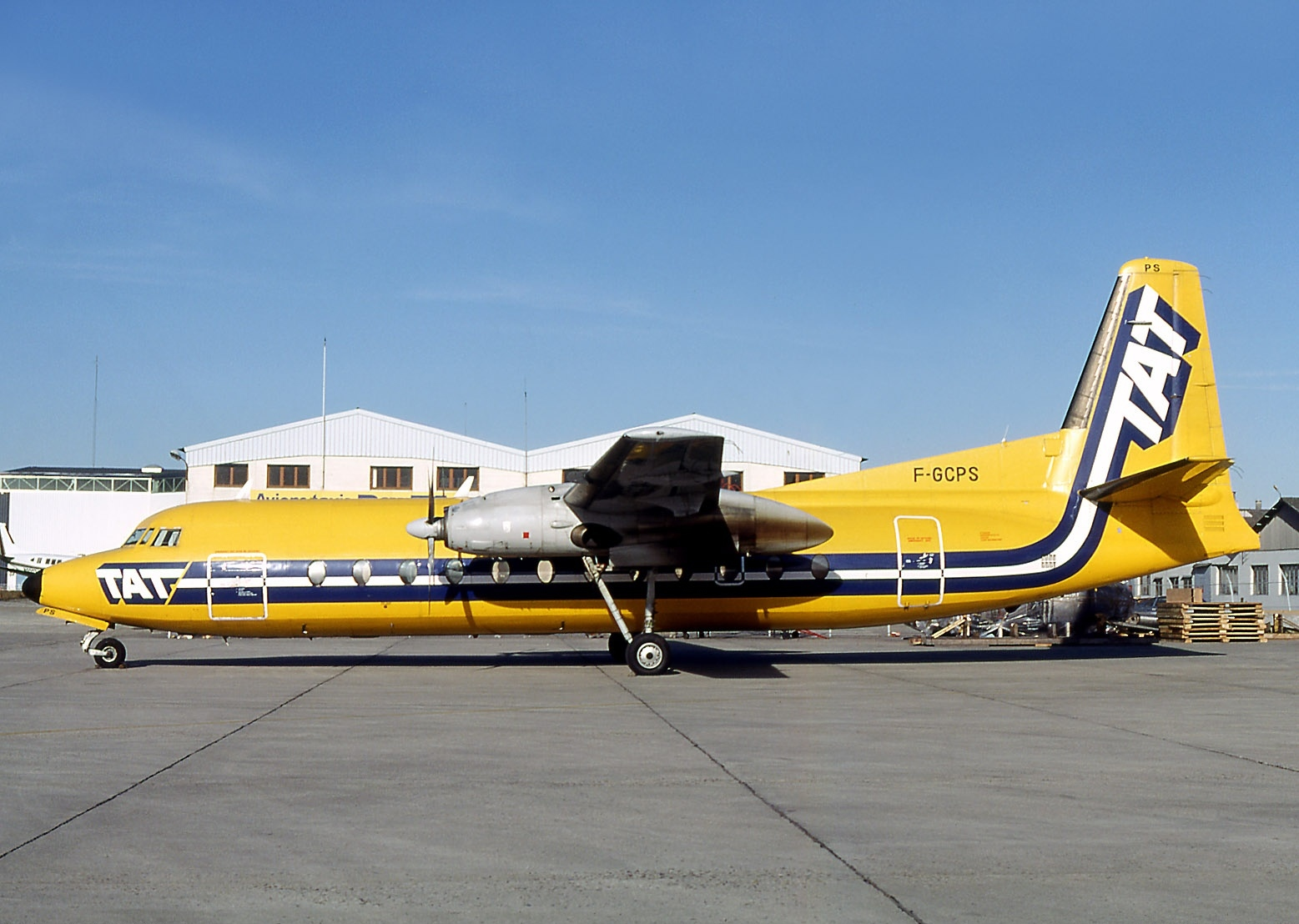
- The aircraft involved in the crash pictured in Le Bourget in February 1985

Accident
- Date: 4 March 1988
- Summary: Electrical failure leading to crash
- Site: Near Fontainebleau, France

Aircraft
- Aircraft type: Fairchild FH-227
- Operator: TAT European Airlines
- Registration: F-GCPS
- Flight origin: Nancy-Essey Airport
- Destination: Paris Orly Airport
- Passengers: 20
- Crew: 3
- Fatalities: 23
- Survivors: 0

TAT Flight 230 was a scheduled flight from Nancy, France to Paris Orly Airport which crashed on 4 March 1988, near Fontainebleau, France. All on board died.

== Accident sequence ==
The aircraft, a Fairchild FH-227, took off from Nancy-Essey Airport at 5:53 local time and climbed to 14,000 feet, the flight's cruising altitude. At 6:26, the aircraft, now nearing Paris, was cleared down to 9,000 feet and then 7,000. Shortly later, the flight was cleared down to 6,000 feet. Nothing more was heard from the aircraft. The aircraft appeared to have an electrical malfunction. Control of the aircraft was lost, the plane descended rapidly, struck powerlines and crashed. All on board died.

== Investigation ==
The investigations findings were that in bad weather conditions, the Fairchild FH-227 operating the flight suffered an electrical malfunction, and the aircraft pitched nose down. The committee could not find a probable cause to why this happened. The accepted hypothesis is that the electrical malfunction caused loss of attitude reference and autopilot disconnect causing the aircraft to enter a high speed dive.

In the absence of an independent horizon, the crew did not have any usable attitude reference while the aircraft was in a high-speed dive, thus contributing to the crash.

== Discrepancy ==
There is a discrepancy of the number of people who died on TAT Flight 230. The official report lists 23 people, where a memorial near the crash site lists 24. One woman who perished on board was pregnant.
