= Nilson (footballer, born 1987) =

São Toméan footballer

Personal information
- Full name: Nilson Taty Sousa Vaz
- Date of birth: 15 November 1987 (age 38)
- Position: Goalkeeper

Team information
- Current team: Praia Cruz

Senior career*
| Years | Team | Apps | (Gls) |
| 2011 | Oque d'El Rey | | |
| 2013– | Praia Cruz | | |

International career^{‡}
| 2011– | São Tomé and Príncipe | 5 | (0) |
- * Club domestic league appearances and goals ‡ National team caps and goals as of 13 November 2020

Nilson Taty Sousa Vaz (born 15 November 1987), simply known as Nilson, is a São Toméan footballer who plays as a goalkeeper for Sporting Praia Cruz and the São Tomé and Príncipe national team.

== International career ==
Nilson made his international debut for São Tomé and Príncipe in 2011.
