= TAT European Airlines =

French regional airline

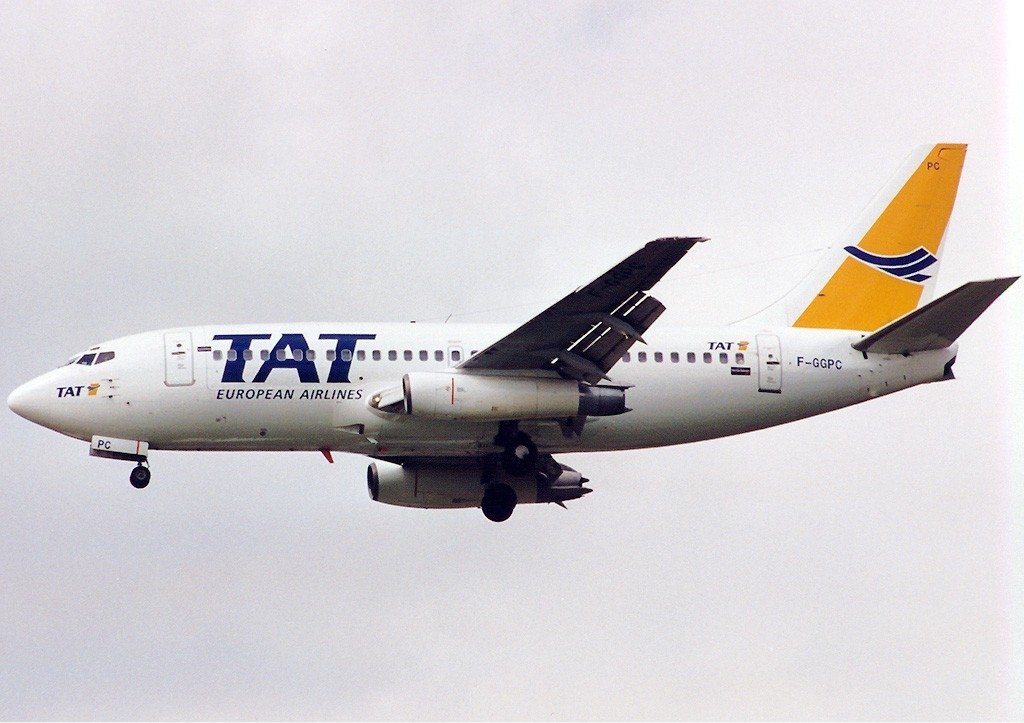
- Boeing 737-200
IATA	ICAO	Call sign
VD	TAT	TAT
- Founded: 1968
- Ceased operations: 1998 (merged into Air Liberté)
- Operating bases: Tours Val de Loire Airport

Transport Aérien Transrégional was a French regional airline with its head office on the grounds of Tours Val de Loire Airport in Tours. It was formed in 1968 as Touraine Air Transport (TAT) by M. Marchais. Air France acquired a minority stake in the airline in 1989. Between 1993 and 1996 the company was gradually taken over by British Airways. It subsequently merged with Air Liberté.

The merged entity was sold on to the SAir Group in 2001, which in turn merged Air Liberté with AOM becoming the renamed "Air Lib" continuing the heritage of TAT until the merged airline failed in 2003.

== History ==
Touraine Air Transport commenced scheduled operations in 1968. The airline acquired its first Beech 99 Airliner twin-engined turboprop passenger airliner in June 1971 and used this type to commence French internal services. These aircraft remained in operation with TAT until 1975.

During the 1970s TAT began building up a comprehensive network of regional, short-haul domestic and international scheduled routes, as a result of being taken over in 1973 by Société Auxiliare de Services et Materiel Aéronautiques (SASMAT), the owner of rival French regional airline Rousseau Aviation, as well as the subsequent mergers with regional rivals Taxi Avia France and Air Paris. The resulting regional network served 30 provincial points in France and neighbouring European countries from Paris Orly, Lyons Satolas, Lille and Saint-Brieuc, respectively.

Many of TAT's French domestic routes were operated in collaboration with Air Inter, at the time the dominant domestic scheduled airline in France as well as the largest domestic airline in Europe. Most international routes were operated in conjunction with Air France, the primary French flag carrier at the time. Year-round services linking Lille with London Heathrow as well as Strasbourg with Milan Linate and a seasonal Béziers-London Gatwick service were among the international routes TAT operated during that time.

All joint operations with Air Inter and Air France were operated under those airlines' flight numbers and were prefixed with those carriers' two-letter airline identification codes as allocated by IATA, i.e. IT for Air Inter and AF for Air France. The aircraft used on all year-round international operations under contract to Air France wore that airline's full aircraft livery.

From the late 1970s until the early 1980s, TAT used to operate a scheduled German internal route linking Saarbrücken with Berlin Tegel. This route was operated on behalf of TAT Export, a wholly owned subsidiary.

The airline also started an express delivery services company in 1976 which still exists as of 2007.

During the early 1980s TAT acquired regional rivals Air Alpes, Air Alsace and UAR-Air Rouergue. As a result of these mergers, the airline established itself as France's largest regional airline as well as the leading regional partner of Air France. It also resulted in an expanded network covering more than 50 points throughout France and Europe. TAT changed its official name to Transport Aérien Transrégional in 1984 to reflect the growth in its scheduled route network.

In July 1989 Air France acquired a 35% stake in TAT. (At that time TAT was the fourth-largest French airline [after Air France, Air Inter and UTA].)

In the early 1990s TAT began taking advantage of the EU's newly liberalised internal air transport market by launching a three times daily scheduled service between Paris-Charles de Gaulle and London Gatwick, the first time it had operated a scheduled service on a major international European trunk route. This was also the time TAT began marketing itself as TAT European Airlines.

In January 1993 British Airways acquired a 49.9% stake in TAT. From then on TAT began operating all international scheduled services in British Airways colours and under BA flight numbers. TAT also joined the British Airways Executive Club frequent flier programme at that time. The change in ownership furthermore resulted in the launch of two new international routes linking Lyon and Marseille with London Gatwick from the start of the 1993 summer timetable period. TAT's subsequent launch of three daily return flights between Paris Orly and London Heathrow complemented British Airways' own thrice daily Heathrow-Orly service. This enabled British Airways to circumvent the slot restrictions the slot co-ordinator for the airports in the Paris region had imposed on Orly's non-resident airline users, which limited each of these airlines to holding a maximum of four daily pairs of slots, and to offer up to six daily round-trips on that route. As a result of these developments, Air France ended all commercial co-operation with TAT.

In August 1996 British Airways acquired the remaining 50.1% of TAT's share capital, thus giving it 100% ownership.

In 1997 British Airways brought TAT under joint management control with Air Liberté, in which it had acquired a controlling stake in October 1996.

British Airways subsequently merged TAT into Air Liberté to achieve a significant reduction in costs and greater operational synergies. The UK flag carrier eventually disposed of the merged entity in May 2001 to rid itself of years of heavy losses and difficult labour relations at its French subsidiaries.

== Fleet ==
Throughout its existence TAT operated a variety of piston-engined commuter airliners as well as regional turboprop and jet aircraft, including the following main types:

- Aérospatiale Corvette
- Aérospatiale / Nord N 262
- ATR 42, ATR 72
- Beechcraft Super King Air
- Beech 99/99A Airliner
- Boeing 737-200
- Boeing 737-300
- DHC-6-300 Twin Otter
- Embraer 120
- Fairchild Metroliner
- Fokker F27, Fairchild F-27A, Fairchild-Hiller FH-227B
- Fokker F28 (1000/2000/4000 series)
- Fokker 100
- McDonnell Douglas DC-9 (10/20 series) (three a/c, short term leases) (Note: also OY-KGE)
- VFW 614

== Liveries ==
Over the years of operation, the airline has used various liveries, in parallel with its growth and acquisitions/mergers with other air carriers.

- The first scheme was very simple. A blue stripe under the window line and TAT lettering inside an oval on the tail.
- The second scheme was more sophisticated. A stripe of two colors (a combination that always differed depending on the aircraft) ran along the window line and continued onto the tail, forming a sort of A. The known combinations were: red/orange, ochre/red, light blue/blue, dark green/light green. TAT lettering always under the cockpit windows.
- Probably the most famous and striking livery was created by the Alain Perraud agency. It was first shown on a VFW 614 in April 1975. The fuselage was painted entirely yellow. A double blue stripe began with TAT lettering under the cockpit windows, ran under the passenger cabin windows, and rose up the tail, once again forming the TAT ideogram. A VFW 614 was instead painted in an olive green color.
- The final and simplest scheme consisted of an all-white fuselage and a large TAT ideogram at the beginning of the passenger cabin windows. The airline's logo was prominently displayed on the yellow tail.
- When the pooling contracts started, many aircraft took on the colours of the partner carriers: Air France (both the livery with blue stripes and the one with the tricolour tail) and British Airways (Landor Associates scheme).

== Gallery ==
TAT paint schemes in strict chronological order:

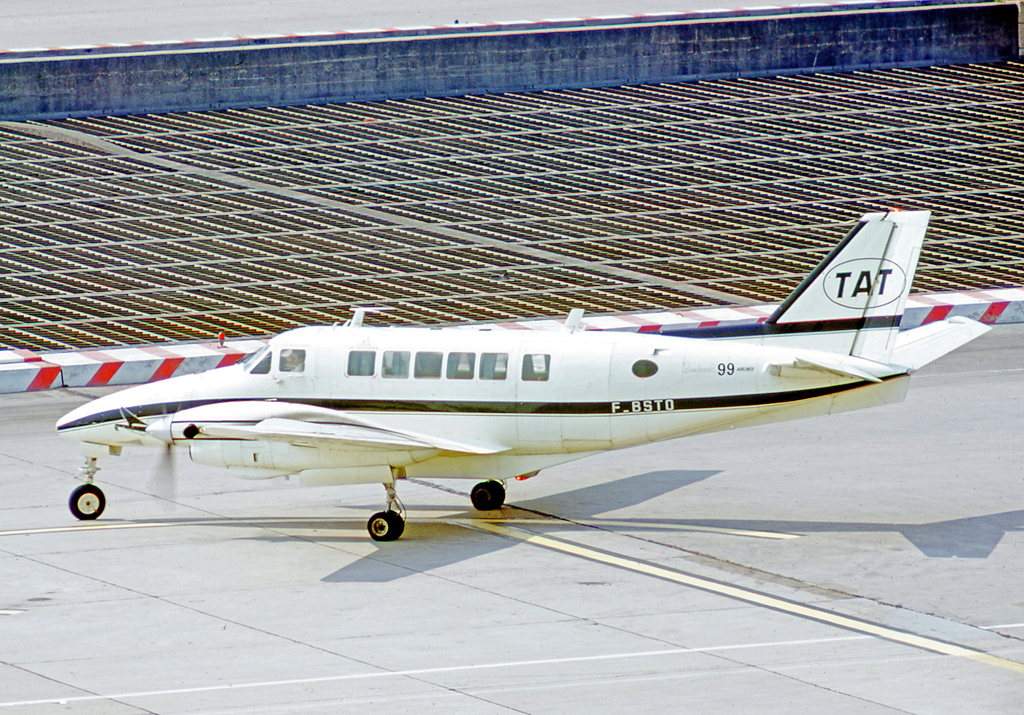
Beechcraft 99 Airliner

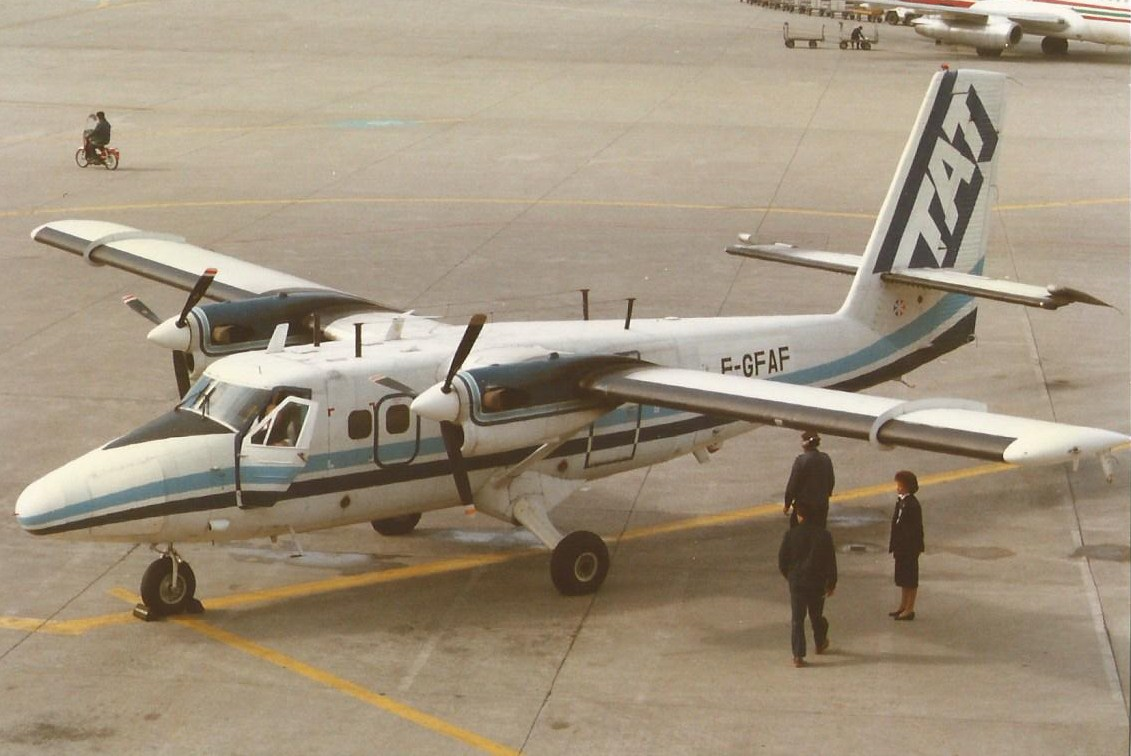
DHC-6-300 Twin Otter

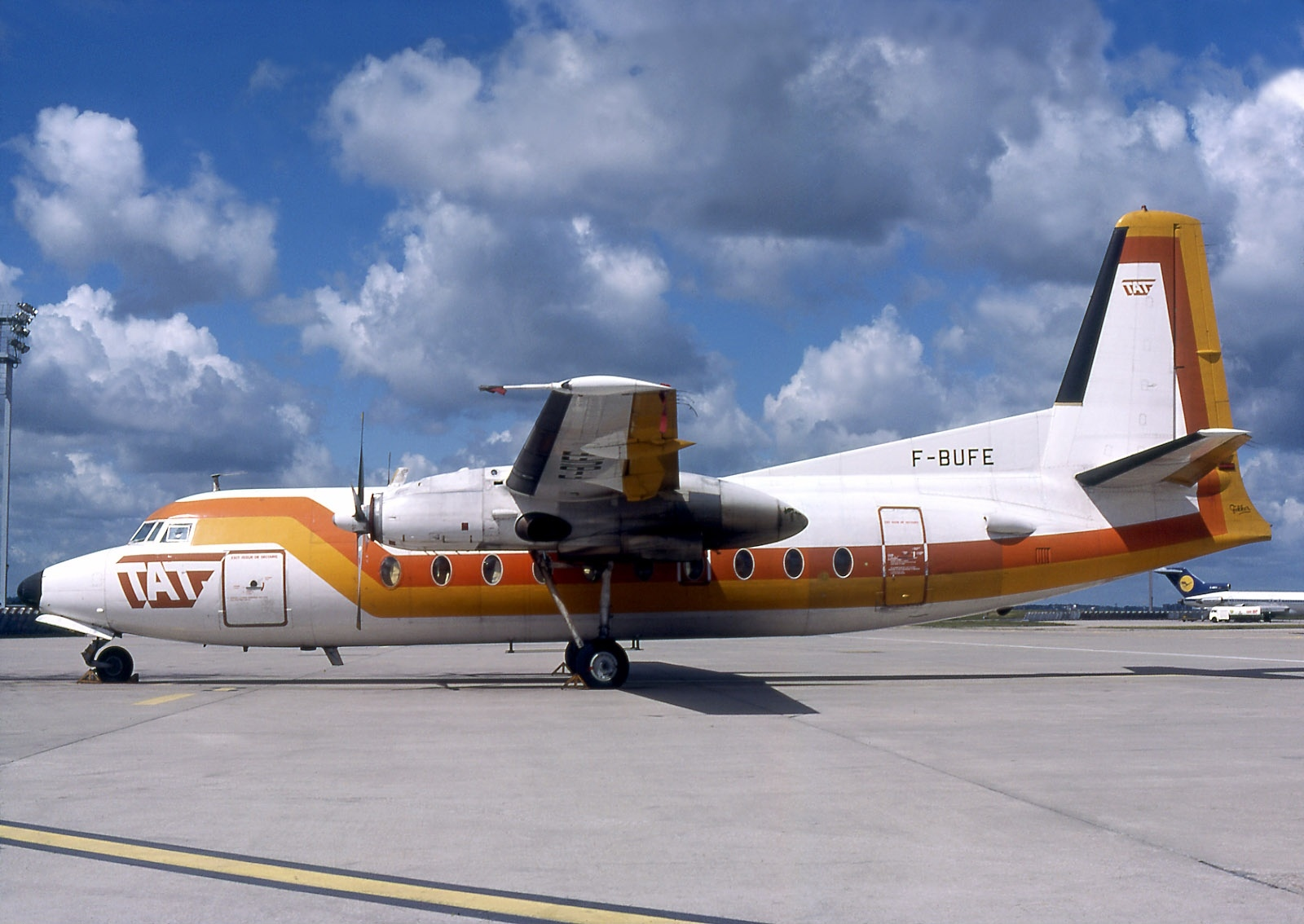
Fokker F27

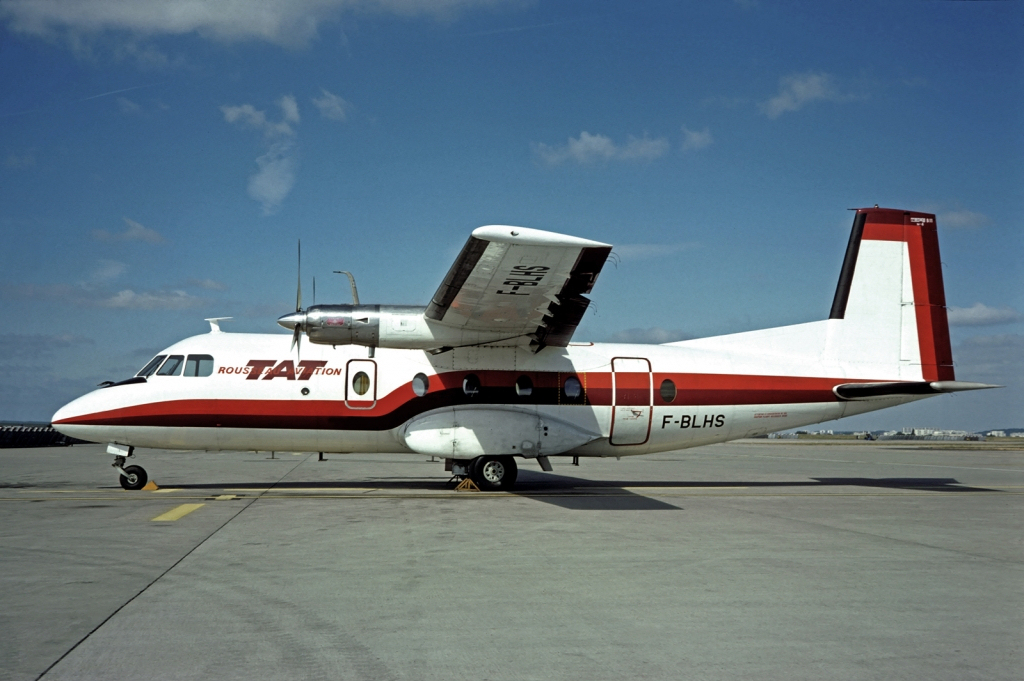
Aérospatiale / Nord N 262 with additional Rousseau Aviation titles

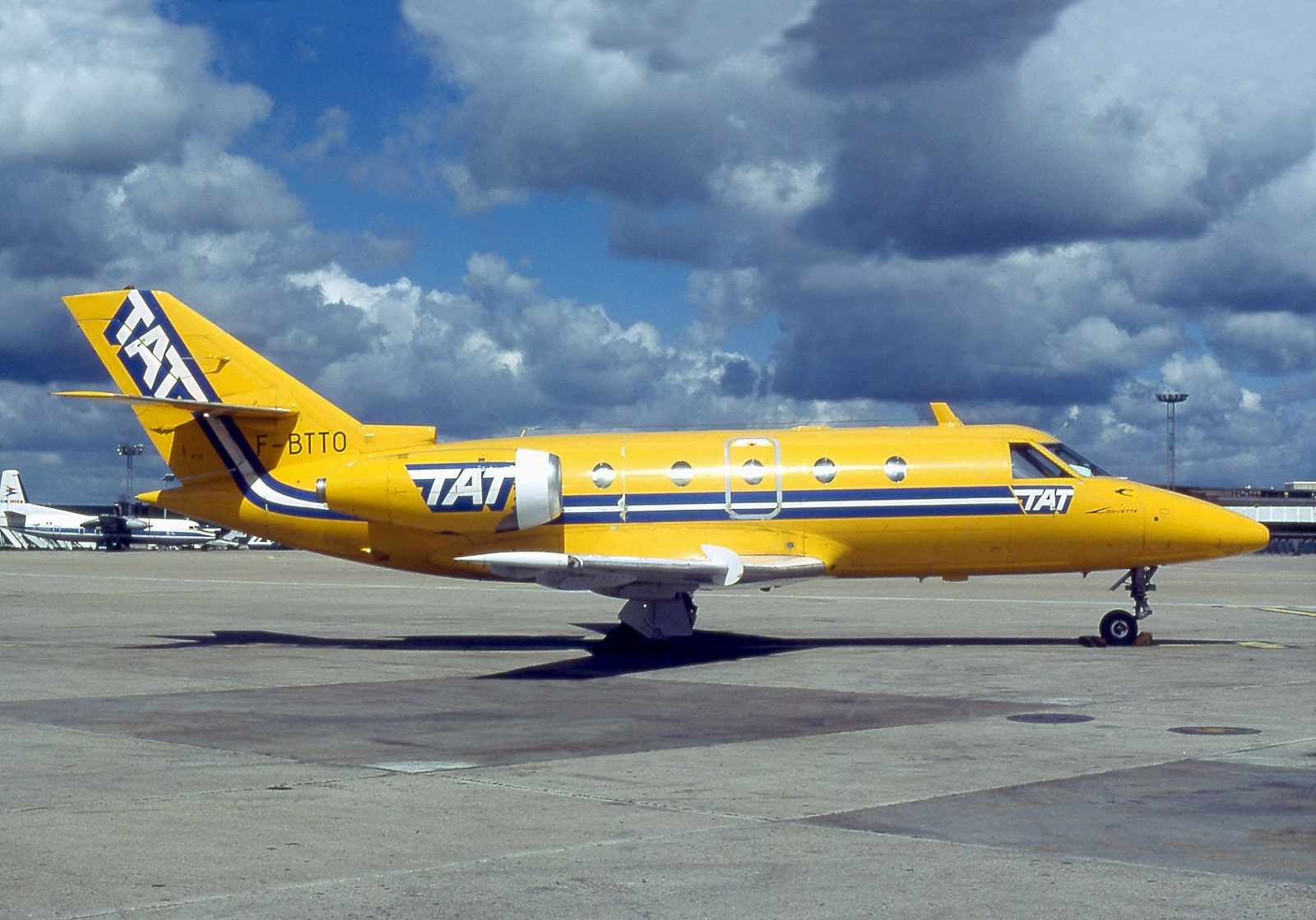
Aérospatiale Corvette

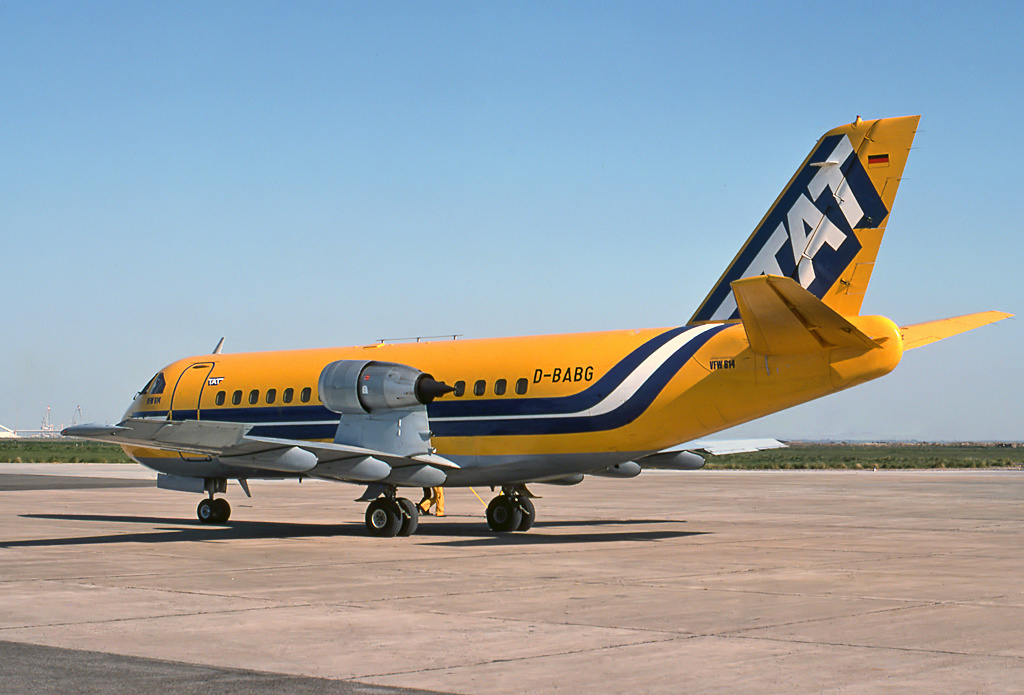
VFW 614

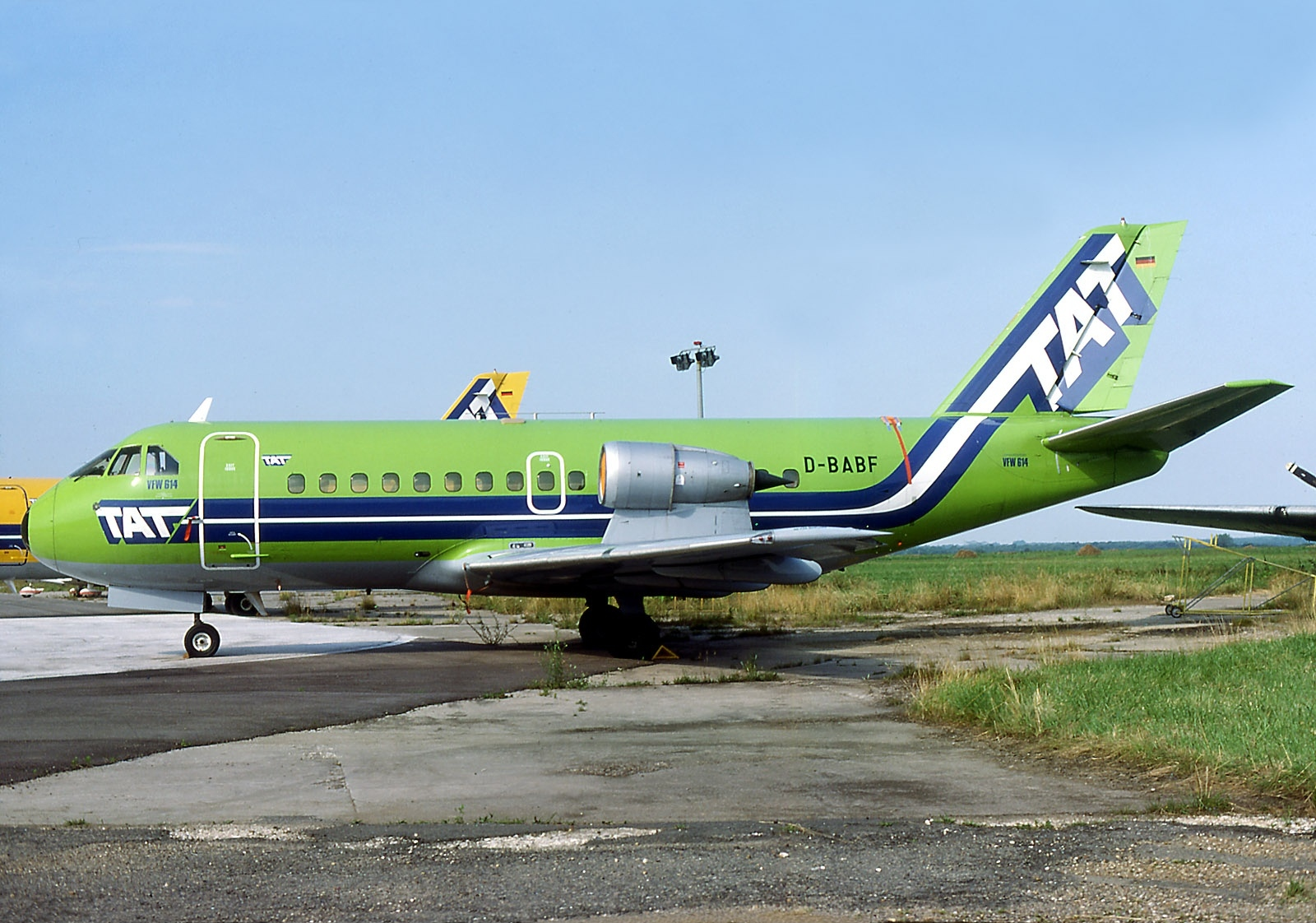
VFW 614 in olive-green variation, 1977

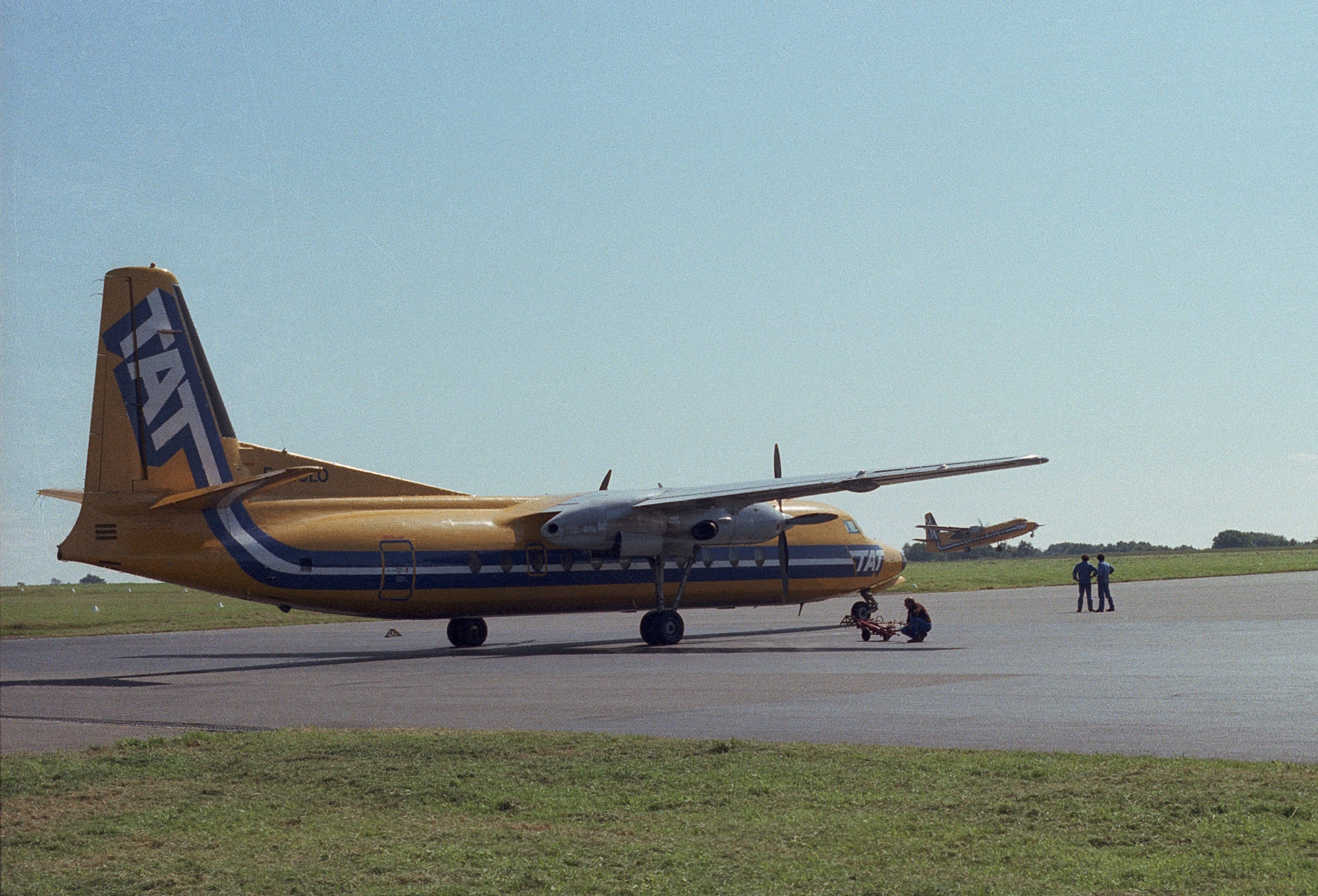
Fairchild-Hiller FH-227B

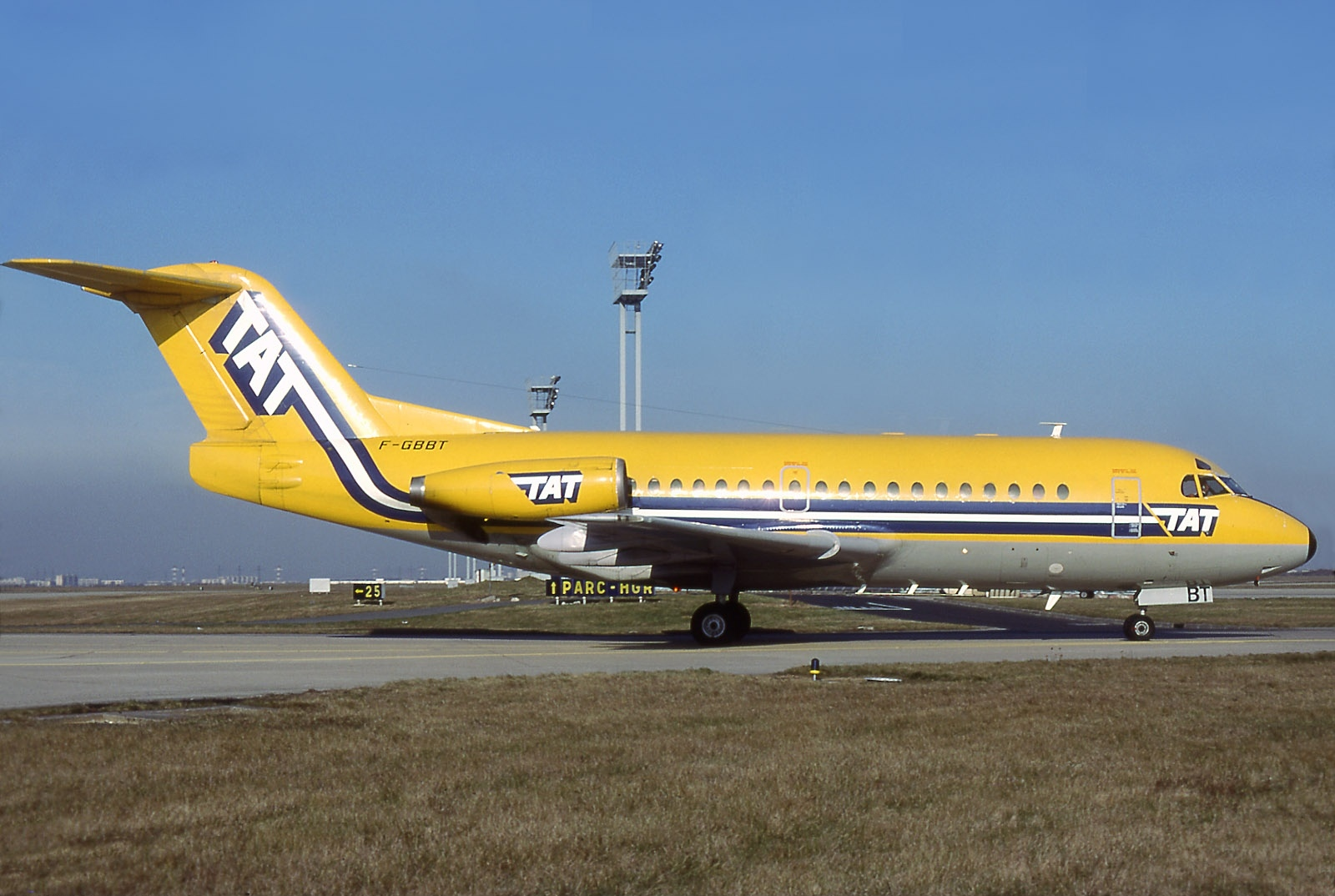
Fokker F28-1000

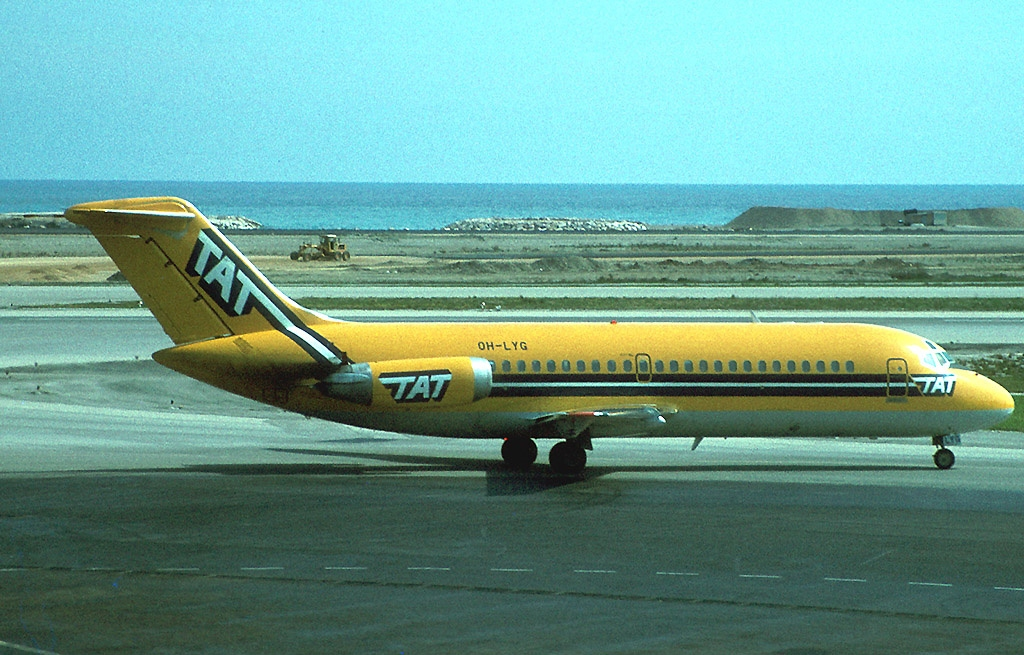
Douglas DC-9 leased from Finnair

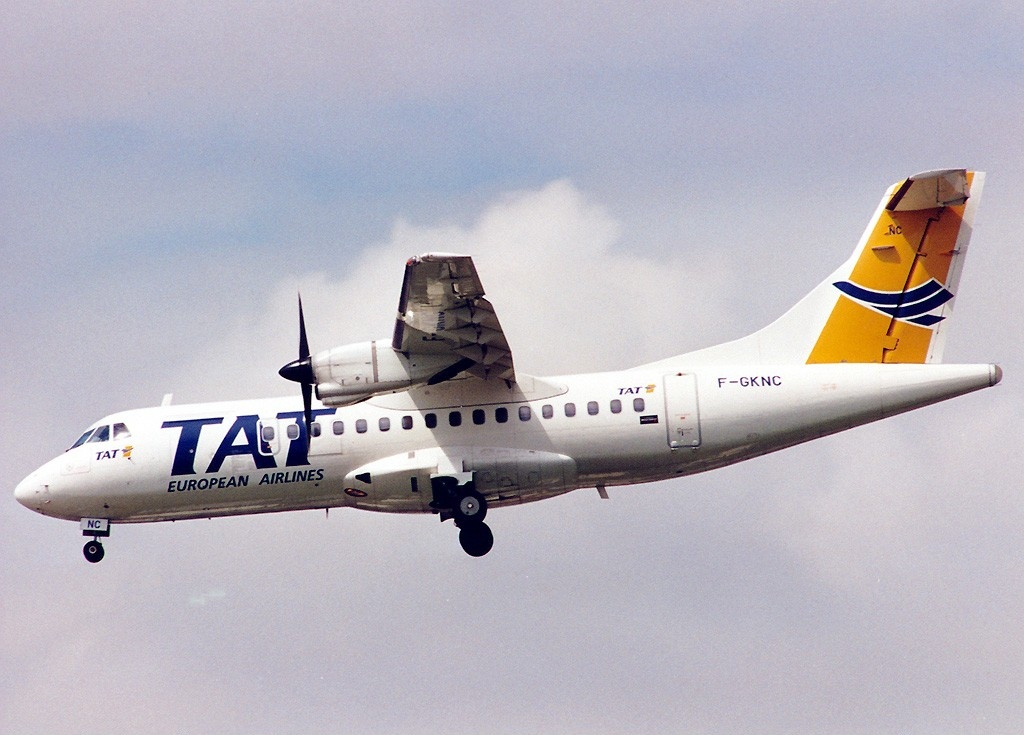
ATR 42-300

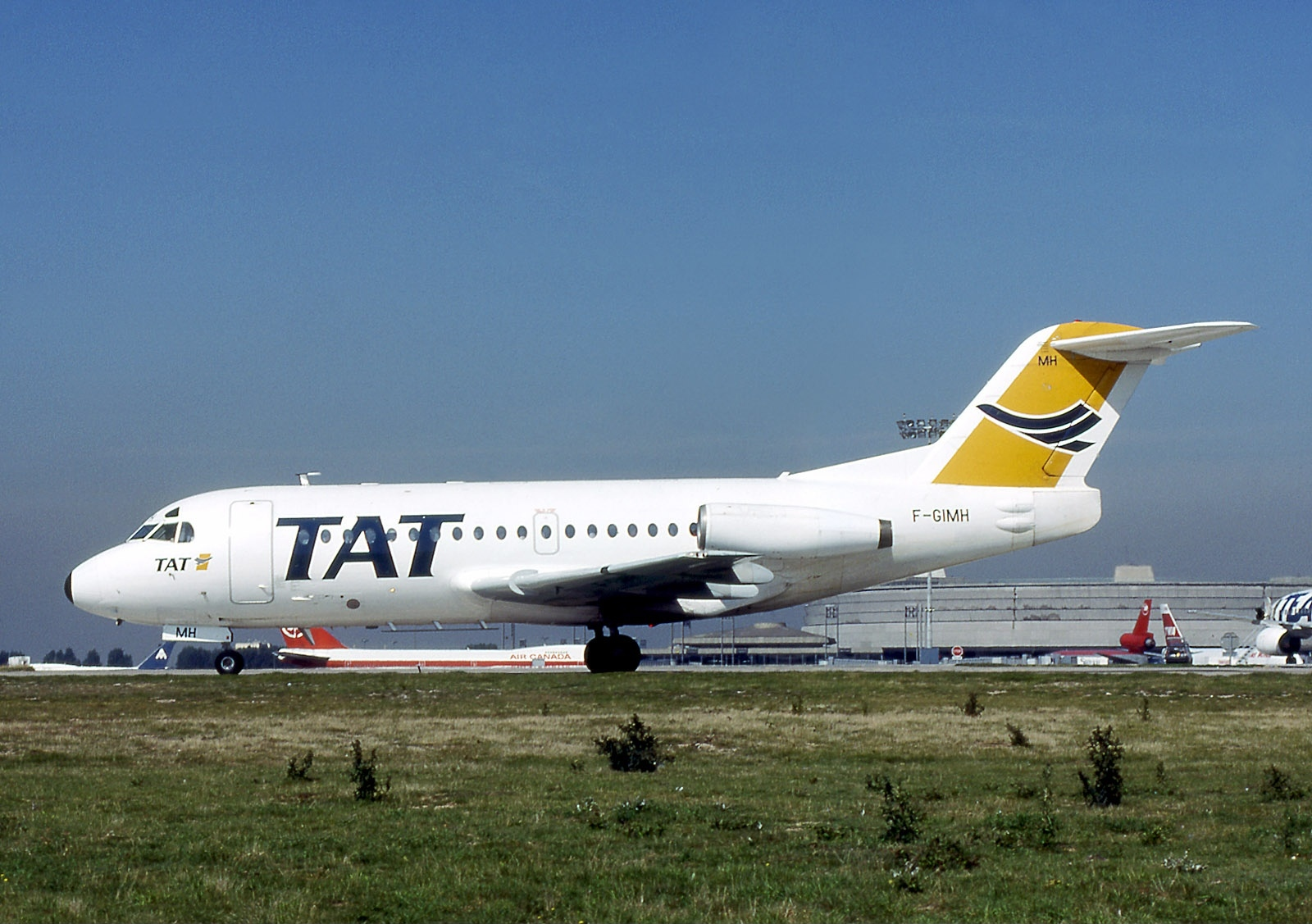
Fokker F28-1000

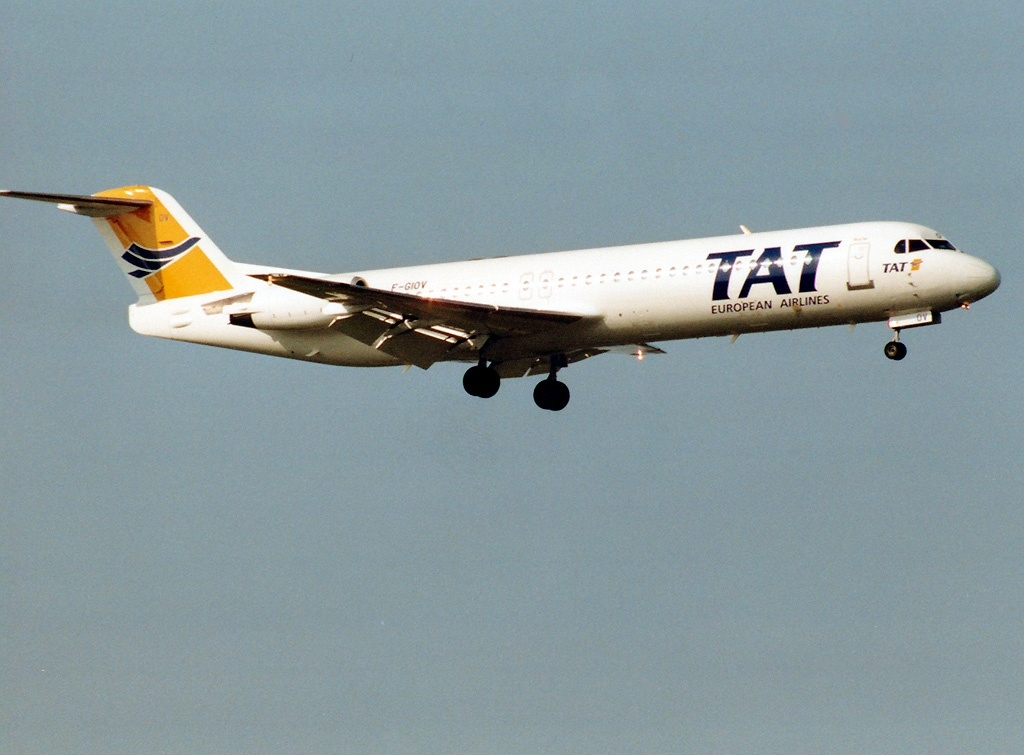
Fokker 100

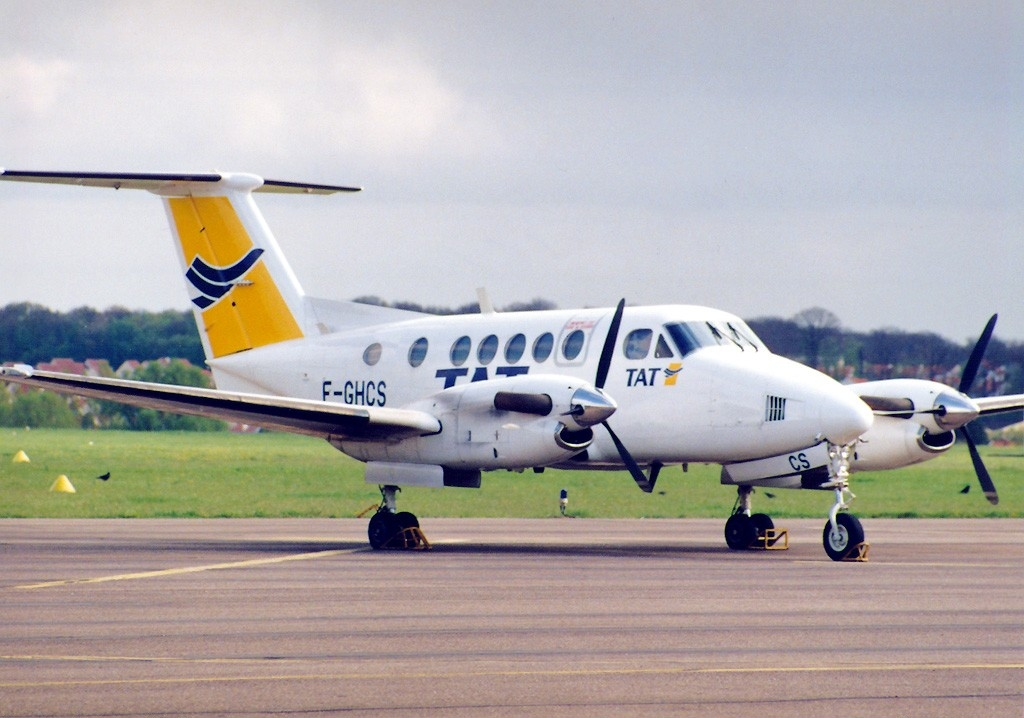
Super King Air

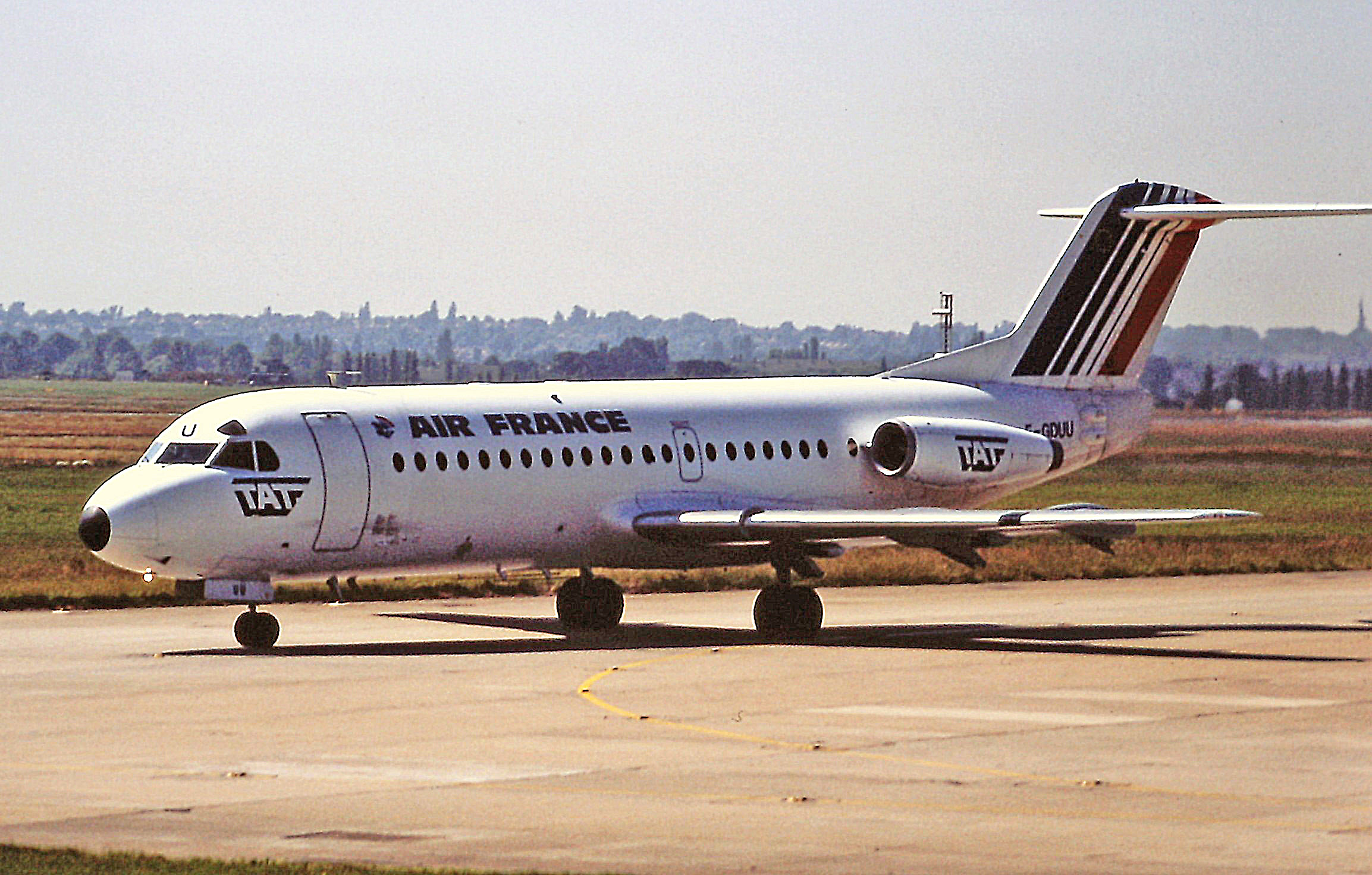
Fokker F28-2000 in full Air France livery

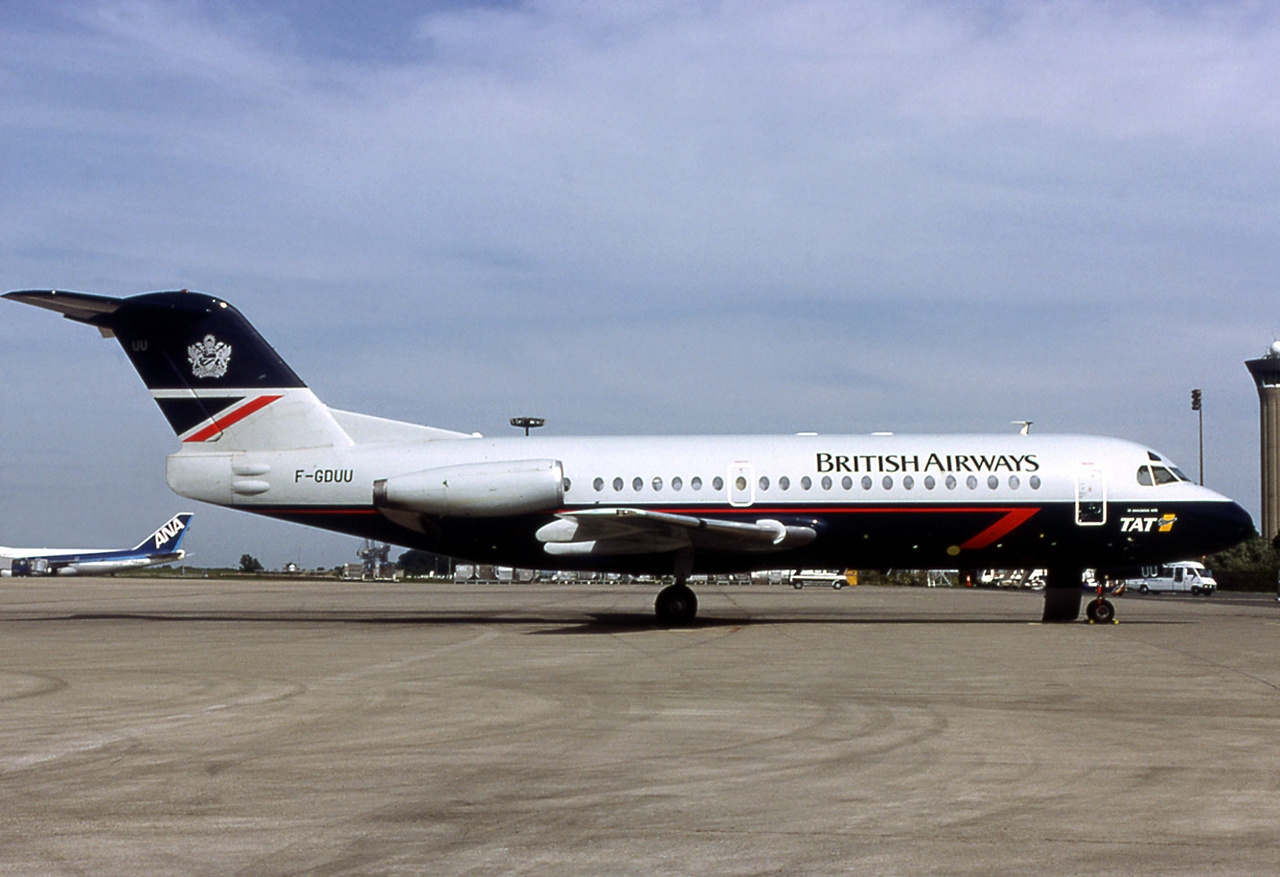
Fokker F28-2000 in full British Airways livery

== Incidents and accidents ==
During its existence TAT suffered two fatal accidents and four non-fatal incidents. These occurred between 1975 and 1991.

=== Fatal accidents ===
The first fatal accident occurred on 2 July 1975. One of the airline's Beech 99 commuter airliners (registration F-BTQE) operating a scheduled domestic flight from Nantes to Brest crashed on take-off from Nantes Airport due to the failure of the aircraft's no. 2 engine, as a result of which it caught fire. The aircraft came down on a nearby railway line. All eight occupants, including both pilots and six passengers were killed in this accident.

The second fatal accident occurred on 4 March 1988. It involved one of the company's Fairchild-Hiller FH227Bs (registration F-GCPS) operating an early morning scheduled service from Nancy to Paris Orly as TAT Flight 230. An electrical system malfunction during the start of the aircraft's descent on the final portion of its flight to Paris Orly resulted in a sudden loss of control. This in turn caused the aircraft to descend very rapidly. It struck power lines and crashed near Fontainebleau, killing all 23 occupants (two pilots, one flight attendant and 20 passengers). This accident constituted the firm's worst air disaster in terms of loss of life.

=== Non-fatal incidents ===
On 5 July 1979 a Fairchild F-27A (registration F-GBRS) with 18 occupants on board was damaged beyond repair in an incident that occurred on the ground at Paris Orly while the aircraft was stationary. None of the aircraft's occupants were injured as a result of that incident. The aircraft was subsequently written off.

On 4 September 1983 a Beech 99 (registration F-BUYG) was damaged beyond repair following a crash at Tours. There were no reported injuries among the aircraft's occupants.

== Code data ==
- Former IATA code (1): VD (TAT)
- Former IATA code (2): IJ (Touraine Air Transport)
- Former IATA code (3): IO (TAT Export)
- Former IATA code (3): IO (Air Paris)
- Former IATA code (4): LX (Air Languedoc)
- Former IATA code (5): RU (Rousseau Aviation)

- Former ICAO code: TAT
- Former callsign:

== Notes ==
- Photograph of timetable
- Photograph of a TAT F28-1000 in Air France colours at Edinburgh Turnhouse in the late 1970s
- Jones, Geoff (2008). Air France - Chapter 9, Other Associated Airlines. Hersham, Surrey, UK: Midland Publishing. ISBN 978-1-85780-285-6.
- British Airways Archives and Museum Collection (1990–present)
- "Flight International". Flight International. Sutton, UK: Reed Business Information. ISSN 0015-3710. (various backdated issues relating to TAT, 1968–2001)
- Berlin Airport - Company December 1977-January 1984 Monthly Timetable Booklets for Berlin Tempelhof and Berlin Tegel Airports (German language edition only), 1977-1984. West Berlin, Germany: Berlin Airport Company.

== Bibliography ==
- Eastwood, Tony, and Roach, John. Turbo Prop Airliner Production List. 1998. The Aviation Hobby Shop. ISBN 0-907178-69-3.
