= List of defunct airlines of France =

This is a list of defunct airlines of France.

For French overseas departments and territories, see the pages of French Guiana, French Polynesia, Guadeloupe, Mayotte, New Caledonia, Réunion, Saint Pierre and Miquelon in their respective geographical areas.

Airline	Image	IATA	ICAO	Callsign	Commenced operations	Ceased operations	Notes			
A
ACE Transvalair		VY	CHX	CHARTER EXPRESS	1984	1994	Trading name of ACE-Air Charter Express and Transvalair from Switzerland joint operations Operated Douglas DC-3 and Fairchild Hiller FH-227			
Aelis Air Service					2004	2010	Charter carrier. Operated Embraer Brasilia			
Aéris		SH	AIS	FRANCE CHARTER	1999	2003	Previously Air Toulouse International			
Aéris Express					2003	2003	Low-cost Aéris subsidiary			
Aéro Cargo					1946	1952	Operated extensively in Algeria. Subsidiary of Societé Aigle Azur since March 1950. Flight operations merged to form Aigle Azur Extreme Orient in FRENCH INDOCHINA (Vietnam). Operated AAC-1 (French manufactured Junkers Ju.52), Douglas DC3, Halifax C.VIII			
Aéro France International		FB	ROF	AIROF	1978	1991	Operated leased Sud Aviation Caravelle			
Aéro Jets Darta			DRT	DARTA	197	2013	Operated Beech Super King Air, Beech King Air, Beech Baron, Learjet 23			
Aéro Services Corporate			CJE		2001	2007				
Aéro Services Executive		W4	BES	BIRD EXPRESS	2000	2004	Operated Dassault Falcons			
Aérolinair			ERN	BLUE HAWK	2002	2015	Airlinair subsidiary Operated Beech 1900			
AeroLyon		4Q	AEY	AEROLYON	1996	2002				
Aéromaritime		QK	QKL	AEROMAR	1966	1992	UTA-Union de Transports Aériens subsidiary			
Aerope 3S Aviation			OPE	PONTOISAIR	2001	2001				
Aéropostale					1918	1933	Previously Lignes Aériennes Latécoère Merged to form Air France			
Aérotour		FV			1976	1980	Operated Sud Aviation Caravelle, Boeing 737-200			
Aigle Azur					1946	1955	Trading name of Societé Aigle Azur S.A. Relauched in 1977 by Lucas Air Transport/Lucas Aviation			
Air Alpes		LP	ALP	AIR ALPES	1962	1981	Merged into TAT-Transport Aérien Transregional (TAT European Airlines)			
Air Alsace		SY			1962	1982				
Air Angouleme			AGL	AIR ANGOULEME	1976	2012				
Air Anjou Transports		SJ		AIR ANJOU	1976	1980	Operated Beech 99 Airliner			
Air Aquitaine		AB			1991	1992	Operated Beech 99 Airliner, Cessna 310			
Air Ardeche		BS			1985	1990	Operated a Piper PA-31			
Air Asie					1928	1929	Merged with Air Union Lignes d'Orient to form Air Orient			
Air Atlantique		V6	APB	CHARENTE	1963	2004	Previously Air Publicité-Air Atlantique			
Air Bleu					1935	1940				
Air Bretagne		3E	BRE	BRETAGNE	1998	2001	Operated Beech King Air, Beech 1900			
Air Bretagne Centre					1973	1980	Scheduled routes on a seasonal basis only Operated Aero Commander 500B			
Air Caen					1949	1987	Operated De Havilland DH-89 Dragon Rapide			
Air Centre					1964	1975	Operated Beechcraft 95-B55 Baron, Britten-Norman			
Air Champagne Ardennes		CZ			1969	1974	Bought by Air Alpes in 1973 and merged in 1974 Operated Beech 99, Cessna 402, Cessna 411			
Air Charter / Air Charter International		SF	ACF	AIR CHARTER	1966	1998	Air Charter International trading name until 1984 when it reverted to Air Charter			
Air Cholet					1970	1972	Operated Cessna 402			
Air Continent					1963	1972	Operated Beech Travel Air, Beech 18S, Cessna 180, Cessna 185, Sud Alouette III			
Air Corse		DK	ARK	AIR CORSE	1985	1990	Operated ATR 42 Embraer Bandeirante Fairchild F-27A			
Air Côte-Basque					1972	1973	Renamed Sud Air Transport. Operated Beech Queen Air			
Air Côte d'Opale			OPL	OPALE	1978	1996	Operated Beech King Air, Piper Aztec			
Air Dauphiné					1964	1970	Renamed TAR-Transports Aériens Réunis Operated Douglas DC-3			
Air Dieppe					1972	1972	Operated Piper Aztec			
Air Entreprise International		KD	AEN	AIR ENTERPRISE	1969	1994	Operated leased Sud Aviation Caravelle			
Air-Estérel		HC				1963	Also known as Transcorse S.A. Operated Beech 18, Lockheed 12, Cessna 180			
Air Exel France		RF	RXL	AIR EXEL	1988	2005	Merged scheduled operations into Regional Airlines in 1992 Restarted own operations in 2004 Operated Embraer Brasilia, Saab 340			
Air France Asie		AF	AFR	AIR FRANS	1994	2007	Air France subsidiary			
Air France Europe					1996	1997	Formed by the merger of Air France medium-haul operations and Air Inter. Fully merged into Air France			
Air Horizons		RN	EUH	EURALAIR HORIZONS	2004	2005	Went bankrupt			
Air Inter		IT	ITF	AIR INTER	1958	1996	Merged into Air France Europe			
Air Inter Europe					1996	1997	trading name of Air France Europe			
Air Jet		V6	AIJ	AIR JET	1981	2003	Jet Services Group division Operated BAe 146, Fokker F27, Saab 2000			
Air Languedoc		LX			1974	1978	Merged operations into TAT Operated Aérospatiale Corvette, DHC-6 Twin Otter			
Air Liberté & Air Lib		VD	LIB	AIR LIBERTE	1988	2001	Renamed Air Lib			
Air Limousin					1967	1976	Merged assets into Air Alpes			
Air Littoral & Cie. Air Littoral		FU	LIT	AIR LITTORAL	1972	2003	Merged operations with Compagnie Aérienne du Languedoc to form Cie. Air Littoral			
Air Lorient			ALO		1990	1990	Operated Métro Merlin II and Beech 200	Air Lorraine	1981	1981
Air Méditerranée		ML	BIE	MEDITERRANEE	1998	2016	Previously Air Midi Bigorre			
Air Midi Bigorre					1997	1998	Renamed Air Méditerranée			
Air Nautic					1958	1966	Previously GECA Operated Boeing 307 Stratoliner, Douglas DC-2, Douglas DC-3, Douglas DC-4, Douglas DC-6, Vickers VC.1 Viking			
Air Nolis					1948	1950	Operated Douglas C-47B			
Air Normandie					1949	1951	Based in Caen Operated Douglas DC 3			
Air Normandie (Normandie Aviation)		ID	RNO	NORMANDIE	1991	2001	Operated BAe Jetstream 31, Beech King Air, Cessna 500 Citation			
Air Ocean					1946	1946	Operated Amiot AAC.1 Toucan			
Air Open Sky			OPN	AIR SKY	1998	2000	Operated ATR 42			
Air Orient					1929	1933	Merged into Air France			
1st Air Ouest					1956	1960	Operated DH.89			
2nd Air Ouest		OE			1972	1976	Operated BN-2 Islander			
Air Outre Mer		QN	AOM	AOM	1990	1992	Merged with Minerve to form AOM French Airlines			
Air Paris		IO	TAD		1959	1975	Previously Air Orly. Merged operations into TAT Operated Beech 99 Airliner, de Havilland Heron, DHC-6 Twin Otter			
Air Passaquay					1972	1992	Operated Cessna 411			
Air Perigord					1967	1973	Operated Beech Queen Air, Cessna 172, Piper Aztec			
Air Poitou-Charentes					1969	1974	Merged into Touraine Air Transport Operated Beechcraft Baron 55, Cessna 170			
Air Provence S.A.					1975	1991	Renamed Air Provence International			
Air Provence Charter			LPU	EUROSTAR	1996	1998	Renamed Virgin Express France in January 1998			
Air Provence International		DG	APR	AIR PROVENCE	1991	2002	Previously Air Provence S.A. Renamed Soc. Nouvelle Air Provence. Changed name to West Air France Operated Grumman Gulfstream I, Beech King Air, FH227, HS 748, Caravelle			
Air Rhuys		RC			1977	1978	Operated Cessna 402			
Air Rouergue		YU			1970	1977	Previously Uni-Air Rouergue Operated Beech 99 Airliner, DHC-6 Twin Otter, Fokker F27, FH-227			
Air Sarthe Organization			ASO		1987	1993	Operated Beechcraft C90 King Air			
Air Service Nantes			ASN	AIR NANTES	1981	1992	Operated Beech 99 Airliner, Boeing 737, Caravelle 10R, DHC-6 Twin Otter, FH-27, FH-227, Fokker F27			
Air Service Vosges			VGE		1976	2005	Operated Beech King Air, Piper Navajo			
Air Toulouse					1969	1989	Renamed Air Toulouse International Operated Beech Baron, Cessna 402			
Air Toulouse International		SH	TLE	AIR TOULOUSE	1989	1999	Previously Air Toulouse. Reformed as SATT-Societé Nouvelle Air Toulouse International S.A. in 1992 Renamed Aeris			
Air Turquoise		RT	RTQ		2005	2006				
Air Union					1923	1933	Merged to form Air France			
Air Vendée		VM	AVD	AIR VENDEE	1975	1992	Merged scheduled operations into Regional Airlines			
Air Vosges		GS	VGE	VOSGES	1969	1975	Merged operations into Air Alsace. Operated Cessna 401, Cessna 402			
Air Wasteels					1969	1975	Operated HP.137 "Jetstream"			
Air West			AWP	WEST AIR	1997	1997	Operated Piper PA-31 for a few months			
Air' Mana			EFC		1966	2016	Operated Swearingen Merlin			
Airbus Industrie					1966	1991	Operations entrusted to Union de Transports Aériens subsidiary Aéromaritime			
Airbus Transport International					1996	2006	Operated Airbus Beluga			
Aire d'Evasions/"Air Evasion"		E3	IVS		1993	1994	Operated Douglas DC-8			
Airlec			ARL		1988	1992	Air Aquitaine Transport scheduled operations trading name. Merged scheduled operations into Regional Airlines			
Airlinair		AN	RLA	AIRLINAIR	1999	2017	Merged operations into HOP!			
AlsaceExel		XT			2004	2005	Brand established by Exel Group			
Alsair		AL	LSR	ALSAIR	1982	2010	Previously Alsace Air Service Operated Beech 1900, Beech King Air, Cessna Citation II			
Alsavia		XG	ALV	ALSAVIA	1989	1993	Operated Embraer Brasilia on Transport Aérien Transregional behalf, and Saab 340 on Air France behalf			
ALTA-Air Limousin Travail Aérien S.A.		QD	LMT	AIR LIMOUSIN	1979	1989	Operated Nord 262, DHC-6 Twin Otter, Swearingen Metroliner, Beech 99 Airliner, Saab 340			
AOM French Airlines		IW	AOM	FRENCHLINES	1992	2001	Merged into Air Liberté			
Aria			ARW	ARIABIRD	2004	2005				
Atlantic Air Lift			HGH	HIGHER	2005					
Atlantique Air Assistance			TLB	AAA	1989	2017	Rebranded Atlas Atlantique Airlines in 2015			
Auxiair		AJ & BS			1975	1980				
Avions Taxis Pyrénéens-"Air Transport Pyrénées"		TF	TPR	PYRENEEN	1984	1997	Previously Gaspe Air Service Merged into Proteus Airlines. Operated Beech King Air, Beech 1900			
Axis Airways- Compagnie Aérienne Française		6V	AXY	AXIS	2000	2001	Previously Axis Airways and New Axis Airways			
B
Belair – Ile de France			BLI		1995	2000	Operated Boeing 727, MD-83			
Blue Line		4Y	BLE	BLUE BERRY	2002	2010				
Bretagne Air Services		VB	ABH	BRETAGNE SERVICE	1976	1981	Operated Douglas C-47, DHC-6 Twin Otter, Partenavia Victor			
Brit Air		DB	BZH	BRITAIR	1975	2017	Merged into HOP!			
C
CAF-Compagnie aérienne française					1919	1937	Founded by Henri Balleyguier.			
CAP Airlines		MO	CBD		1995	2001				
CATAIR		QV			1969	1978	Operated Lockheed Constellation, Sud Aviation Caravelle, Sud Aviation Caravelle VIR			
CCM Airlines		XK	CRL	CORSAIR	2000	2010	Trading name of Compagnie Corse Mediterranée			
CFRNA-Compagnie Franco-Roumaine de Navigation Aérienne					1920	1925	Joint French-Romanian airline. Renamed CIDNA in 1925			
Champagne Airlines			CPH	CHAMPAGNE	1998	2005	Trading name of CAE-Compagnie Aeronautique Europeenne			
CIDNA-Compagnie Internationale de Navigation Aérienne					1925	1933	Previously CFRNA. Merged with four other airlines to form Air France. Operated Fokker F.VII			
CIP Transports					1999	2001	Operated Airbus A319, Dassault Falcon 900EX			
Compagnie Aérienne du Languedoc		WL; FQ			1976	1988	Merged with Air Littoral to form Cie. Air Littoral			
Compagnie Aérienne Corse Méditerranée		XK	CCM		1990	2000	Renamed Air Corsica			
Compagnie Aérienne Poitou-Charentes "Air Poitou-Charentes"					1994	1997	Previously Mid Airways Operated ATR 42, Fokker F28, Piper Aztec			
CAE-Compagnie Aeronautique Europeenne		C9	FEU	AEROCOM	1991	2002	On-demand passenger, freight and medivac charters			
Compagnie Air Frêt		FZ			1964	1982	Operated Bristol Freighter, Douglas DC-3, Douglas DC-4, Douglas DC-7, Lockheed Constellation, Boeing 707			
Compagnie Air Transport		TF			1946	1970	Operated Bristol Freighter, Carvair			
CMA - Compagnie des Messageries Aériennes					1919	1923	Merged with Grands Express Aériens to form Air Union			
Compagnie de Transport Aérien et de Commerce					1948	1957	Founded by Roger Colin. Operated Douglas C-47			
Compagnie des Transports Aéronautiques du Sud-Ouest					1919	1919				
Compagnie Générale Aéropostale					1918	1933	Merged to form Air France			
Compagnie générale transaérienne					1909	1921	First French airline. Absorbed by Compagnie des Messageries Aériennes			
Compagnie Grands Express Aériens					1919	1923	Merged with Compagnie des Messageries Aériennes to form Air Union			
Compagnie Nationale Air France					1948	1998	Changed cororate name to Societé Air France			
Continent Air Paris		MO	CBD	MOONLIGHT	1995	1998				
Continentale Air Service			CAS		1978	1979	Operated Aérospatiale Corvette			
Crossair Europe		QE	ECC	CICOGNE	1998	2005	Trading name of Europe Continental Airways			
D
Dakota Air					1993	1997	Operated Douglas DC-3			
Dirac Aviation		YM	DAV	DIRAC	1985	1990	Operated Swearingen Merlin IV			
Diwan			DWA	DIWAN	1992	1997	Operated Beech 200, Grumman Gulfstream I			
Drakk'Air		XP	DKR	DRAK AIR	1989	1992	Operated Beech 200, Beech Baron, Piper Cheyenne			
E
Eagle Aviation France			EGN	FRENCH EAGLE	1998	2009	Resurrected in March 2009 as Noor Airways			
EAS Europe Airlines		EY	EVT	EURO LINE	1965	1995	Previously Europe Aéro Service			
Émeraude Air Transport					1976	1977	Operated Beech Queen Air			
Escadrille Mercure					1946	1970	Operated Beech 18, Lockheed 12A, SFERMA Marquis			
Euralair-Euralair International S.A.		RN	ERL	EURALAIR	1964	2003				
Euroberlin France		EE	EEB	EUROBER	1988	1994	Franco-German joint airline			
Eurojet Airlines			EUF		2002	2004	Went bankrupt			
Europ'Air		ER			1967	1976	Operated Cessna 310, Cessna 402			
Europe Aéro Fret					1986	1986	Operated Trislander			
Europe Air Charter				EAC	1972	1972				
Europe Airpost		5O	FPO		1999	2015	Bought by ASL Aviation Holdings and renamed ASL Airlines France			
F
Fairlines		LK	FIR	FAIR	1998	1998	Operated MD-81			
Flandre Air		IX	FRS		1977	2001	Merged into Regional Airlines			
Flywest					2004	2005				
France Dakota					1998	1998	Operated Douglas DC-3			
France DC3 SA					1991	1998	Renamed Publi-Air. Operated Douglas DC-3			
French Blue		BF	FBU	SUNLINE	2016	2018	Renamed French Bee			
Fretair					1970	1975	Operated Douglas DC-3			
G
GECAT Fret					1948	1950	Operated Curtiss C-46			
H
Heli-Transport		OI	HLT	HELI TRANSPORT	1975	1994	Operated Eurocopter AS350 Écureuil, Aérospatiale Alouette II			
Heliglobe Finet France Cargo					1996	1997	Operated HS 748, CASA Aviocar			
Hex'Air		UD	HER	HEX AIRLINE	1991	2017	Merged into Twin Jet			
I
ICS - InterCiel Services			ICS		1991	2001	Established as Intercargo Service. Operated Boeing 737-200			
IGavion		TE	IGA		2013	2018	Trading name of Skytaxi France-based operations			
Inter Cargo Service			ICS	INTERCARGO	1987	1991	Renamed ICS-InterCiel Services. Operated Lockheed L-100-30 Hercules, Vickers Vanguard			
J
Jet Alsace		WU	JLS		1988	1993	Renamed TransAlsace			
Jet Europe					1989	1990	Operated Sud Aviation Caravelle			
Jet Fret		JF	JFT		1987	1993	Operated Lockheed L-100-30			
Joon		JN	JON	JOON	2017	2019	Air France subsidiary merged back into parent company			
K
Kallistair		FU			1973		Operated BN-2 Islander			
Kel Air			CET		1986	1990				
Kyrnair		KH; V4	KYN	GOLDBIRD	1986	1999	Operated ATR 42, Embraer Bandeirante			
L
L-Air			LRK		2002	2003				
L'Aéropostale					1991	2000	Renamed Europe Airpost. Operated Boeing 727-200, Boeing 737-200			
L'Avion		A0	AVI	ELYSAIR	2007	2009	Trading name of Elysair Merged into OpenSkies			
LAM					1941	1945	Military airline in "Free France" territories during WWII			
Les Avions Bleus					1949	1952	Operated Curtiss C-46			
Level France					2018	2021				
Lignes Aériennes Farman					1919	1924	Rebranded as Société Générale des Transports Aériens			
Lucas Aigle Azur					1977	1987	Trading name of Lucas Air Transport scheduled operations			
Lucas Air Transport		LK			1970	1987	Alternate name of Lucas Aviation Renamed Aigle Azur-Société Transports Aériens Operated Embraer Bandeirante, Saab 340			
Lucas Aviation		LK			1970	1987	Used also Lucas Air Transport name			
M
Minerve		IW	MIN	MINERVE	1975	1992	Merged to form AOM French Airlines			
MiriadAir			MYR	MIRIADAIR	1987	1990	Operated Cessna Caravan, Cessna Citation II			
N
Nantes Aviation		NV			1970	1979	Operated de Havilland Dove, Beech 18			
New Axis Airways		9X	AXY		2009	2009				
Noor Airways					2009	2010				
Normandie Air Services			NDS		1970	1984	Operated de Havilland Dove, Douglas DC-3			
O
Occitania Jet Fleet			OJF	OCCITANIA	1997	2004	Corporate carrier. Operated Beech 1900D, Fokker 100			
Ocean Airways		OG	OCW		2003	2005	Failed project			
Octavia Airlines		O4	OCN		2001	2005				
P
Pan Européenne			EUP / PEA		1977	1994	Ceased airline-type operations			
Point Air		FW			1980	1987	Went bankrupt			
Proteus Air System					1985	1996	Renamed Proteus Airlines			
Proteus Airlines		YS	PRB	PROTEUS	1996	2001	Previously Proteus Air System. Merged into Regional Airlines			
Publi-Air					1999	2001	Established as France DC3 SA. Operated Douglas DC-3			
Pyrénair		YD			1973	1979	Merged into UAR-Air Rouergue Operated Beech 18, Beech Duke, Cessna 402, DHC-6 Twin Otter			
R
Régional		YS	RAE	REGIONAL EUROPE	2011	2013	Trading name of Regional Airlines			
Regional Airlines			RGI		1992	2013	Merged into HOP!			
Réseau des Lignes Aériennes Françaises					1945	1946	Post-WWII provisional airline. Assets merged into Societé Nationale Air France			
Rousseau Aviation S.A.		RU			1963	1976	Scheduled operations merged into TAT Operated HS-748			
S
SANA-Société Anonyme de Navigation Aeriennes					1946	1949	Operated Bloch MB.220			
SATI					1948	1949	Merged with Aeromaritime to form Union de Transports Aériens			
SCELA					1933	1933				
SCLA					1940	1945				
Services Aéronatiques Roannais		QT	RNS	SARA	1980	1996	Previously SAR Avions Taxis Operated Beech King Air, Beech 1900, Merlin IV			
Sinair					2000	2001	Renamed Axis Airways			
SNATI (Air Toulouse)										
Société Auxiliaire de Gérance et de Transports Aériens					1953	1959	Operated SNCASE Armagnac			
Société Commerciale du Littoral					1992	1996	Operated Bristol Freighter			
Societé aérienne française d'affrètements					1966	1969	Renamed Air Charter International			
Société d'Exploitation du Matériel Aéronautique Français					1949	1953	Operated Latécoère 631			
Société Générale des Transports Aériens					1924	1933	Merged to form Air France			
Société de Transports Aériens Alpes Provence					1947	1952	Operated Consolidated Liberator, Douglas DC-3			
Société de Transports Aériens Internationaux et Régionaux					1990	1993	Operated Sud Aviation Caravelle			
Star Airlines		SE	SEU	STARWAY	1997	2006	Established as Star Europe. Renamed XL Airways France			
Star Europe					1995	1997	Renamed Star Airlines			
Stellair Transports Aériens					1982	1993	Went bankrupt. Fleet taken over by Air Toulouse. Operated Douglas DC-3, Fairchild F27, Embraer Bandeirante, Fokker F28			
Strategic Airlines		EF	STZ		2009	2010				
Sud Air Transport					1973	1974	Previously Air Côte Basque Operated Beech King Air			
Sud Airlines			SDU	SUD LINES	2003	2006				
SVT Air Touring					1972	1973	Operated Sud Aviation Caravelle			
T
T.A.I.-Compagnie des Transports Aériens Intercontinentaux				TAI	1946	1963	Merged to form UTA-Union de Transports Aériens			
TAM-Transports Aériens du Midi					1946	?	Operated Caudron Goéland			
T.A.P.-Transports Aériens Privés					1974	1975	Operated Piper PA-31			
TAT European Airlines		VD	TAT		1968	1998	Previously Touraine Air transport S.A., T.A.T., and Transport Aérien Transregional. Merged into Air Liberté			
Taxi Avia France			ATX		1965	1975	Previously Avia Taxi France and Avia France. Merged operations into TAT (TAT European Airlines). Operated Beech 99 Airliner, Cessna 206, Cessna 402, Piper Aztec			
TEA France		FN	TFR	TRANSAIRWAYS	1989	1995				
Thalass Air					1971	1979	Operated Beech Baron, Beech King Air, Beech Queen Air			
Trans Air Bretagne			TRB	AIR BRETAGNE	1973	1993	Operated Cessna 402			
Trans Alsace			TAS	TRANALSACE	1993	1994	Operated Airbus A320, Boeing 737-400, MD-80			
Trans Azur Aviation					1981	1983	Operated Dart Herald			
Trans-Union					1966	1974	Operated DC-4, DC-6, Sud Aviation Caravelle			
Transport Air Centre		UH	CTR	AIR CENTRE	1978	1994	Operated Beech King Air, Piper Aztec, Swearingen Merlin IV			
Transport Aérien Transregional					1989	1990	Previously T.A.T. Renamed TAT European Airlines Operated ATR 72, FH-227, Fokker F28, Nord 262			
Transports Aériens Reunis					1964	1974	Previously Air Dauphiné Operated DC-3, DC-4, DC-6, DC-7, Vickers Viking 1B			
U
UAR-Union Aéronautique Regionale-Air Rouergue		UZ			1977	1979	Merged into Transport Aérien Transregional Operated Beech 99 Airliner, DHC-6 Twin Otter, Fokker F27			
UAT-Union Aéromaritime de Transport			UAT		1949	1963	Merged to form Union de Transports Aériens			
Uni Air International			UAI	UNIAIR	1969	1993	Operated Carvair, Aérospatiale Corvette, FH-227, Falcon 20, Learjet 35			
Uni Air Rouergue					1970	1974	Renamed Air Rouergue Operated Beech 99 Airliner, Beech Baron, Beech Queen Air, Cessna 182			
UTA-Union de Transports Aériens		UT	UTA		1963	1992	Merged into Air France			
V
Vargas Aviation					1971	1975	Operated Douglas DC-3			
Virgin Express France S.A.			VEF	LADYBIRD	1988	1999	Previously Air Provence Charter			
W
Westair		F3	FWA		1975	2004	Previously Air Provence International Operated Boeing 737-200			
World Wide Helicopters					1959	1961	Operated Bell 47, Cessna 170, DHC-1, DHC-2 Beaver, PBY Catalina, Hiller UH-12, Sikorsky S-58			
X
XL Airways France		SE	XLF	STARWAY	1995	2019	Previously Star Airlines			

== See also ==
- List of airlines of France
- List of defunct airlines of Oceania § French Polynesia
- List of defunct airlines of the Americas § Guadeloupe
- List of defunct airlines of the Americas § Martinique
- List of defunct airlines of Oceania § New Caledonia
- List of defunct airlines of Africa#Réunion
- List of airports in France
