= Lycée Hélène Boucher =

Lycée Hélène Boucher may refer to:

- Lycée Funay – Hélène Boucher – Le Mans
- Lycée Hélène Boucher in Paris
- Lycée Hélène Boucher in Somain, Nord
- Lycée Hélène Boucher in Thionville
- Lycée Hélène Boucher in Toulouse
- Lycée Hélène Boucher in Tremblay-en-France (Paris area)
- Lycée Hélène Boucher in Vénissieux
