= Virgin Airlines =

Virgin Airlines may refer to:

Active airlines:

- Virgin Atlantic
- Virgin Australia

Defunct airlines:

- Virgin America (sold and merged into Alaska Airlines)
- Virgin Atlantic Little Red
- Virgin Blue
  - V Australia
  - Pacific Blue Airlines
  - Polynesian Blue
- Virgin Express (merged with SN Brussels Airlines to form Brussels Airlines)
  - Virgin Express France
- Virgin Nigeria Airways (rebranded as Air Nigeria)
- Virgin Sun (sold and merged into Air 2000)

== See also ==
- Virgin Group
- Virgin Galactic
- Virgin Orbit
- Virgin Balloon Flights
