= 1963 Air Nautic Vickers Viking crash =

Aviation accident

1963 Air Nautic Vickers Viking
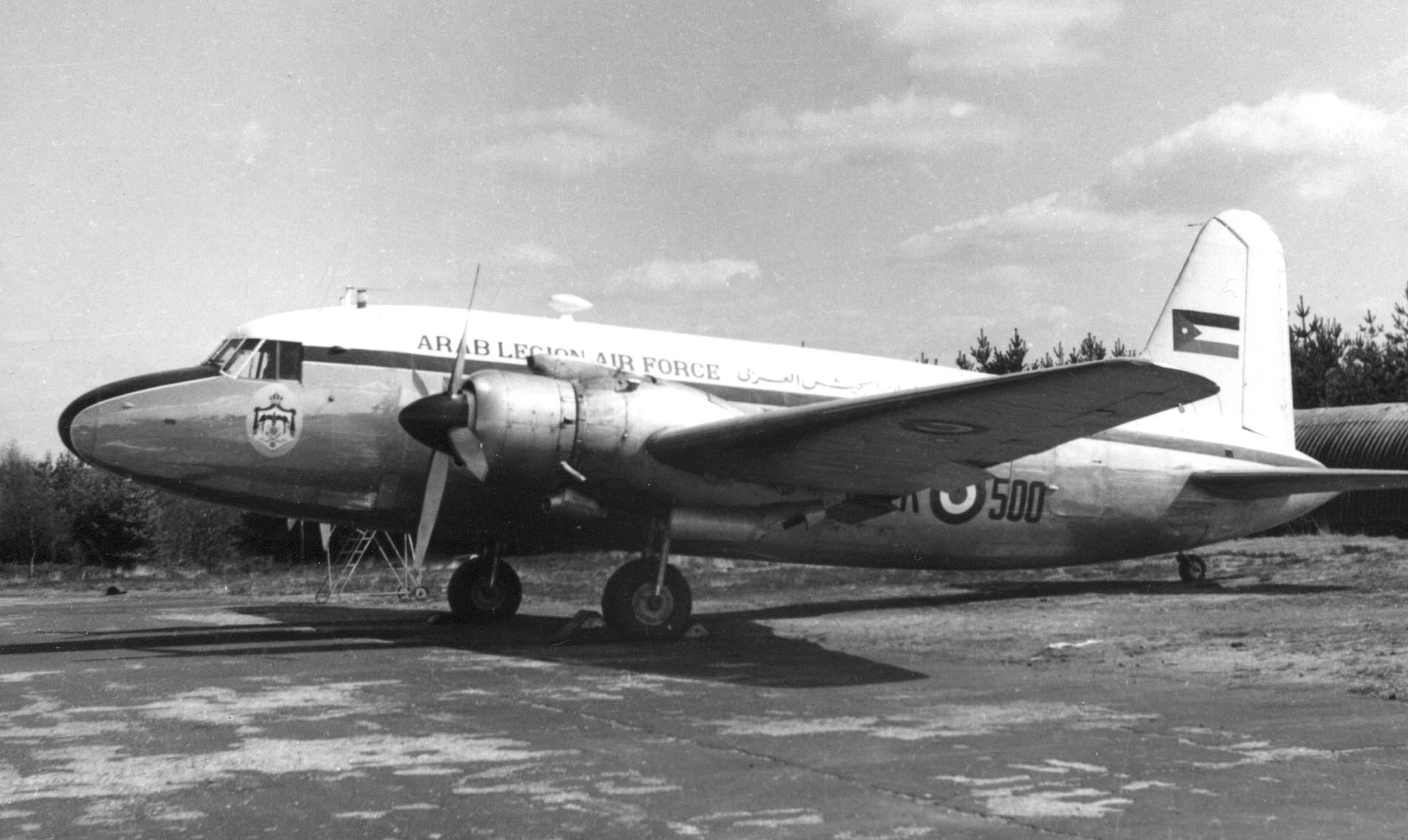
- A Vickers Viking, similar to the aircraft involved

Accident
- Date: 12 September 1963
- Summary: Controlled flight into terrain
- Site: Py, France; 42°28′44″N 2°24′36″E

Aircraft
- Aircraft type: Vickers VC.1 Viking
- Operator: Air Nautic
- Registration: F-BJER
- Flight origin: London-Gatwick Airport, London, United Kingdom
- Destination: Perpignan–Rivesaltes Airport, Perpignan, France
- Occupants: 40
- Passengers: 36
- Crew: 4
- Fatalities: 40
- Survivors: 0

On 12 September 1963, a Vickers Viking of Air Nautic (also referred as AirNautic) operating as a charter passenger flight from London-Gatwick to Perpignan crashed into the north face of the Canigó mountain near the small town of Py in France. In the accident, all 40 occupants were killed.

It was the second fatal air crash in less than a year for Air Nautic. On 29 December 1962, 25 people had been killed in the crash of an Air Nautic Boeing 307.

== Investigation ==
The accident was investigated by the Bureau of Enquiry and Analysis for Civil Aviation Safety (BEA).

In June 1964, the BEA published their findings. The crew made navigation errors after selecting a direct route without reporting their position. Weather conditions were poor and there was limited equipment in Perpignan. The crew also failed to use the Toulouse and Istres VORs for accurate positioning. Air Nautic was aware that the captain and the copilot did not meet the required qualifications for operating a public transport aircraft. Additionally, Air Nautic did not provide the crew with operational instructions that might have prevented the accident. Finally, the crew was in a state of fatigue, which may have affected their performance.

== See also ==
- 1962 Air Nautic Boeing 307 crash
