= 1962 Air Nautic Boeing 307 crash =

Aviation accident

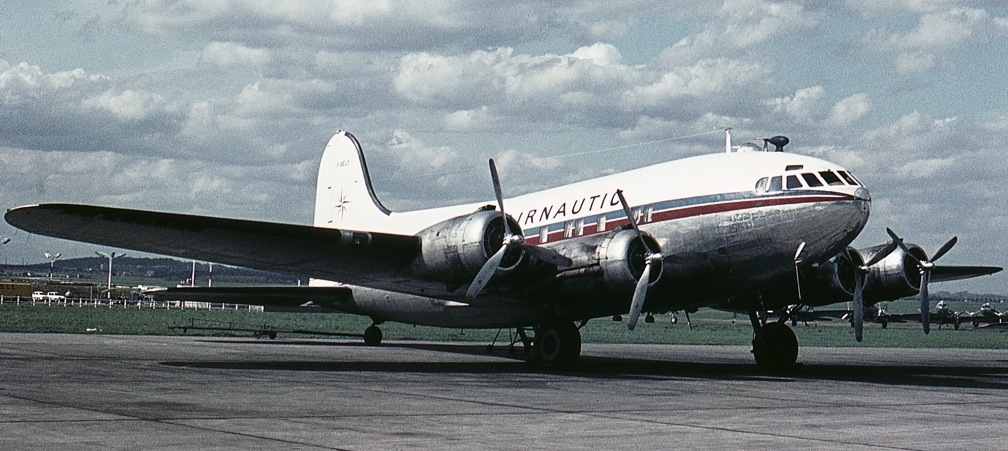
- Air Nautic Boeing 307, similar to the aircraft involved

Accident
- Date: 29 December 1962
- Summary: Controlled flight into terrain
- Site: Monte Renoso, Corsica (France); 42°01′59″N 9°04′48″E

Aircraft
- Aircraft type: Boeing 307 Stratoliner
- Operator: Air Nautic
- Registration: F-BELZ
- Flight origin: Bastia-Poretta Airport, Bastia, France
- Stopover: Ajaccio Napoleon Bonaparte Airport, Ajaccio, France
- Destination: Nice Côte d'Azur Airport, Nice, France
- Occupants: 25
- Passengers: 22
- Crew: 3
- Fatalities: 25
- Survivors: 0

On 29 December 1962, a Boeing 307 Stratoliner of Air Nautic (also referred as AirNautic) operating as a charter passenger flight from Bastia to Nice via Ajaccio crashed into Monte Renoso mountain on the island of Corsica, France. In the accident, all 25 occupants were killed.

== Aircraft ==
The aircraft involved was a twenty-two-year-old four-engine turboprop Boeing 307 Stratoliner with serial number 2001 and registration F-BELZ.

== Investigation ==
The accident was investigated by the Bureau of Enquiry and Analysis for Civil Aviation Safety (BEA).

In June 1964, the BEA published their findings. A series of errors had been made by the crew, who made insufficient preparation for the flight and committed a serious error in estimating the duration of the flight. The crew failed to observe the cruising altitude entered on the flight plan and check properly the navigation of the aircraft, which resulted in a wrong estimation of the position of the aircraft. They also failed to maintain a safe altitude and started the descent prematurely, subsequently entering into instrument flight conditions.

== See also ==
- 1963 Air Nautic Vickers Viking crash

== Sources ==
- "Accident description". Aviation Safety Network.
