= LPY =

LPY may refer to:

- Le Puy – Loudes Airport, France, IATA airport code
- Liverpool South Parkway railway station, Liverpool, National Rail station code
- Lalu Prasad Yadav, Indian politician
