= Hex'Air =

Regional airline in France, 1991–2017

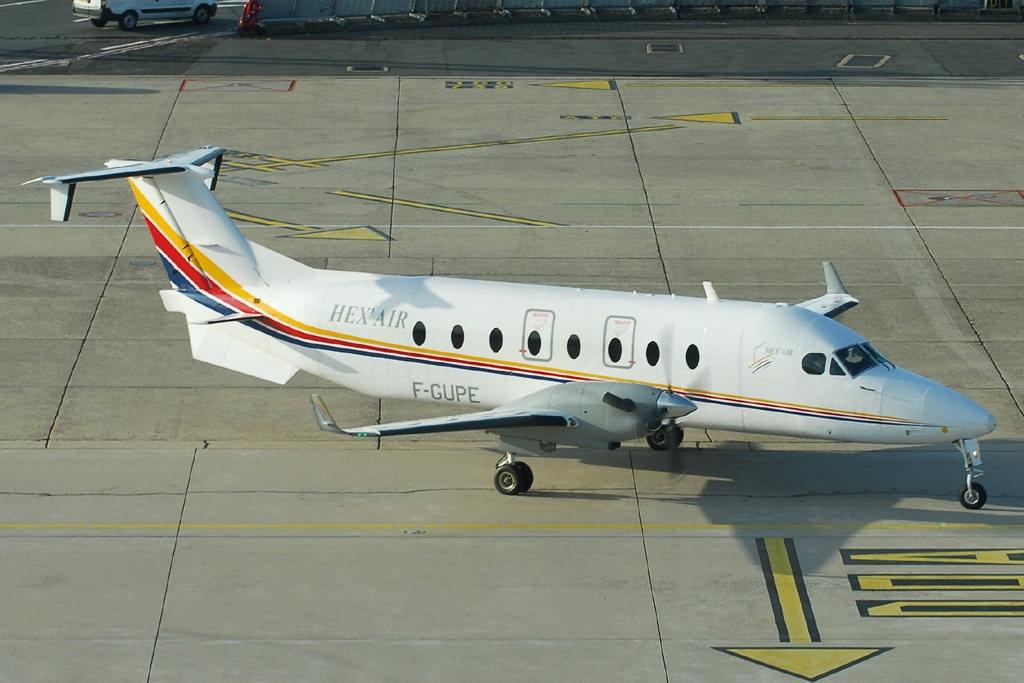
- Beechcraft 1900D
IATA	ICAO	Call sign
UD	HER	HEX AIRLINE
- Founded: 1991
- Ceased operations: 2017 (merged with Twin Jet)
- Hubs: Le Puy – Loudes Airport
- Fleet size: 2
- Destinations: 2
- Headquarters: Le Puy, France
- Website: hexair.com

Hex'Air was a French regional airline based at Le Puy – Loudes Airport in Le Puy-en-Velay.

== History ==
The airline was established on 30 March 1991, was owned by Financiere Hex'Air (80%) and had eight employees as of March 2007. During 2006 the airline added an Embraer ERJ 145 (F-HBPE) to its fleet. Both Embraer aircraft were used for charter flights and were regularly flown on behalf of other European regional airlines needing additional capacity Hex'Air suspended one of its two scheduled routes, from Castres via Rodez to Lyon, indefinitely on 24 January 2014.

In early January 2017, Hex'Air merged with French competitor Twin Jet and was dissolved, with its routes and aircraft being integrated into the new joint company.

== Destinations ==
As of July 2016, Hex'Air only operated services on the following domestic scheduled route:

- Le Puy – Loudes Airport - Paris-Orly Airport

The airline also offered an additional coach service from Mende to the airport in Le Puy.

== Fleet ==
As of July 2016, the Hex'Air fleet included the following aircraft:

Hex'Air fleet
Aircraft	Total	Passengers	Notes
Beechcraft 1900D	2	19	
