= Hôtel de Ville, Tremblay-en-France =

Town hall in Tremblay-en-France, France

Hôtel de Ville
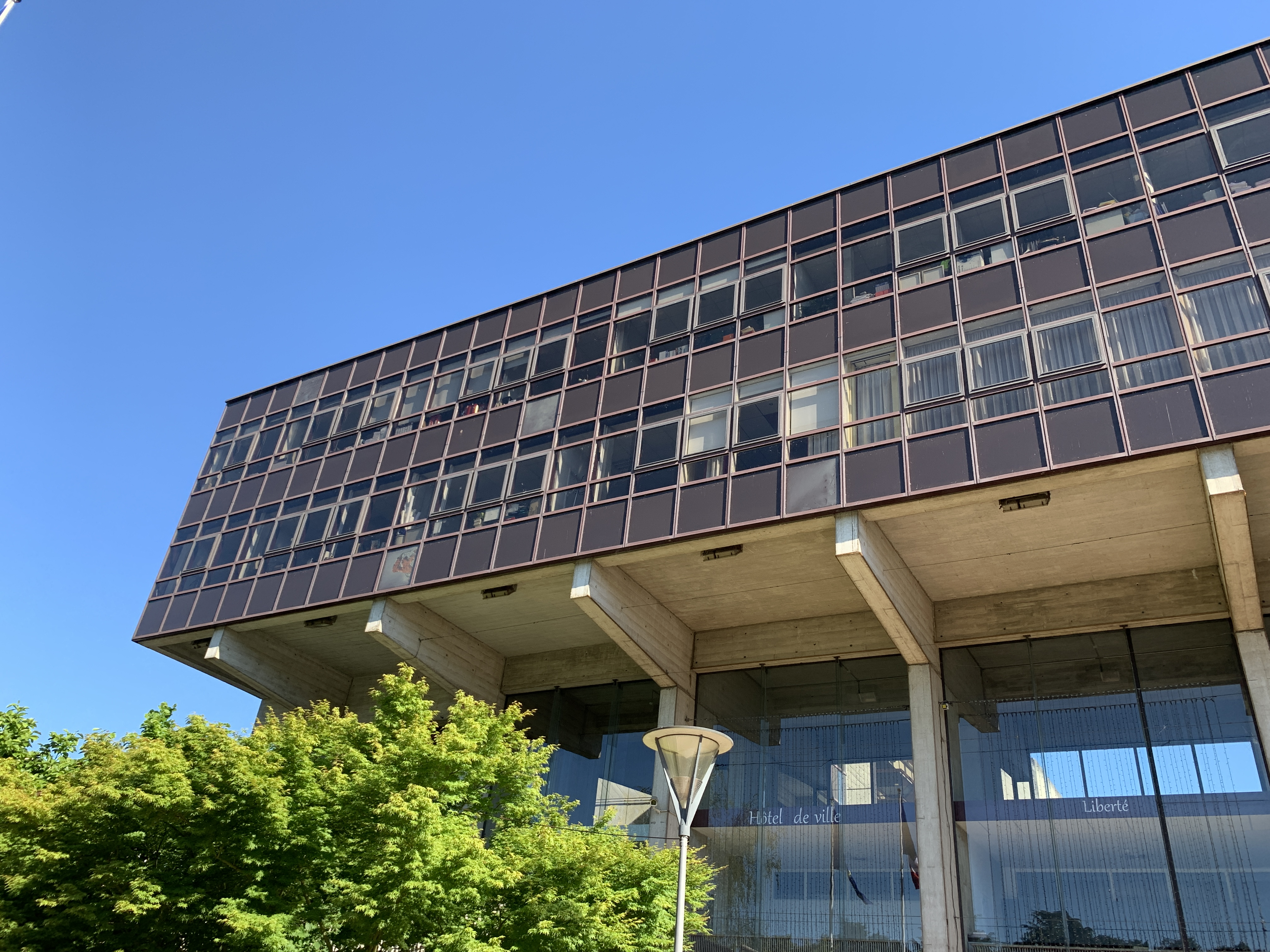
- The main frontage of the Hôtel de Ville in May 2020
- Interactive map of the Hôtel de Ville area

General information
- Type: City hall
- Architectural style: Modern style
- Location: Tremblay-en-France, France
- Coordinates: 48.9512°N 2.5707°E
- Completed: 1981

Design and construction
- Architect: Jean Préveral

The Hôtel de Ville (French pronunciation: [otɛl də vil], City Hall) is a municipal building in Tremblay-en-France, Seine-Saint-Denis, in the northeastern suburbs of Paris, standing on Boulevard de l'Hôtel de ville.

== History ==
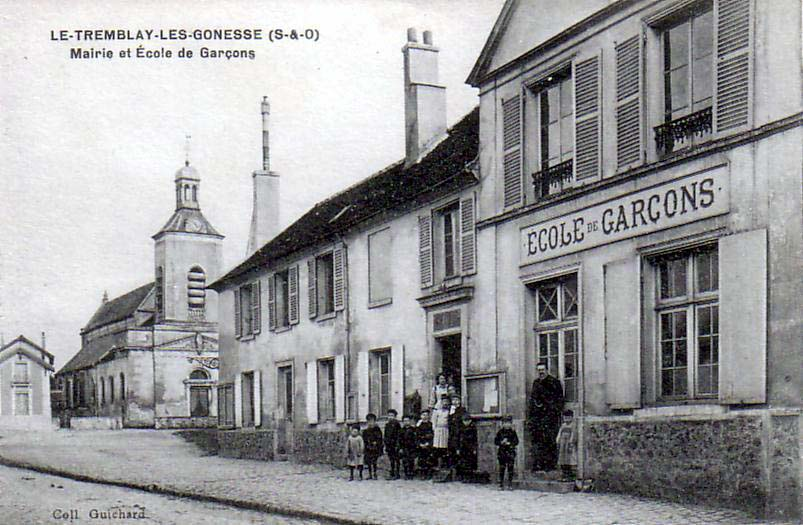
The old town hall (between the church and the school)

Following the French Revolution, the town council initially met at the home of the mayor at the time. In the first half of the 19th century, the council decided to establish a combined town hall and school complex. The site they selected was just to the west of the Church of Saint-Médard in the old part of the town. The town hall, which formed the east end of the complex, was a two-storey rectangular building. The design involved an asymmetrical main frontage of five bays facing onto the town square (now Rue du Colonel Rol Tanguy). There was a doorway in the right-hand bay and it was fenestrated with casement windows with shutters.

On 18 August 1944, during the Paris insurrection, part of the Second World War, an employee at the town hall, Antoine Cusino, was arrested for supporting members of the French Forces of the Interior as they sought petrol for their vehicles. Cusino was taken to the local German command post, Château Bataille, where he was shot, and his body was then dumped in front of the town hall. This was nine days before the liberation of the town by the French 2nd Armoured Division, commanded by General Philippe Leclerc, on 27 August 1944.

Following the creation of a Zone à Urbaniser en Priorité (urban development zone) in the 1960s, significant development took place to the south of the old town with extensive new housing being created. In March 1972, the council led by the mayor, Georges Prudhomme, decided to commission a modern town hall in the new part of the town. The site they selected, on the southeast side of what is now Boulevard de l'Hôtel de ville, was purchased from Société Centrale Immobilière de la Caisse des dépôts, a subsidiary of Caisse des dépôts et consignations, in early 1977. Construction of the new building started in October 1977. It was designed by Jean Préveral in the modern style, built in concrete and glass and was officially opened by the mayor on 10 January 1981.

The design involved an asymmetrical main frontage of ten bays facing onto Boulevard de l'Hôtel de ville. The left-hand section of seven bays was recessed on the lower three floors, with access through glass doors on the ground floor, and large plate glass windows spanning the first and second floors. The third and fourth floors of the left-hand section were cantilevered out over the pavement and faced with alternating bands of black panelling and dark-framed windows. The right-hand section of three bays was faced with concrete on the ground floor, recessed plate glass on the first floor and alternating bands of black panelling and dark-framed windows on the second, third and fourth floors. Internally, the principal room was the Salle du Conseil (council chamber).

A plaque to commemorate the change of name of the town from Tremblay-lès-Gonesse to Tremblay-en-France was installed on the first floor on the town hall on 17 August 1989. The public areas on the ground floor were refurbished and a new entrance was created at the rear of building, adjacent to Esplanade des droits de l'homme, in 2012.
