= AlsaceExel =

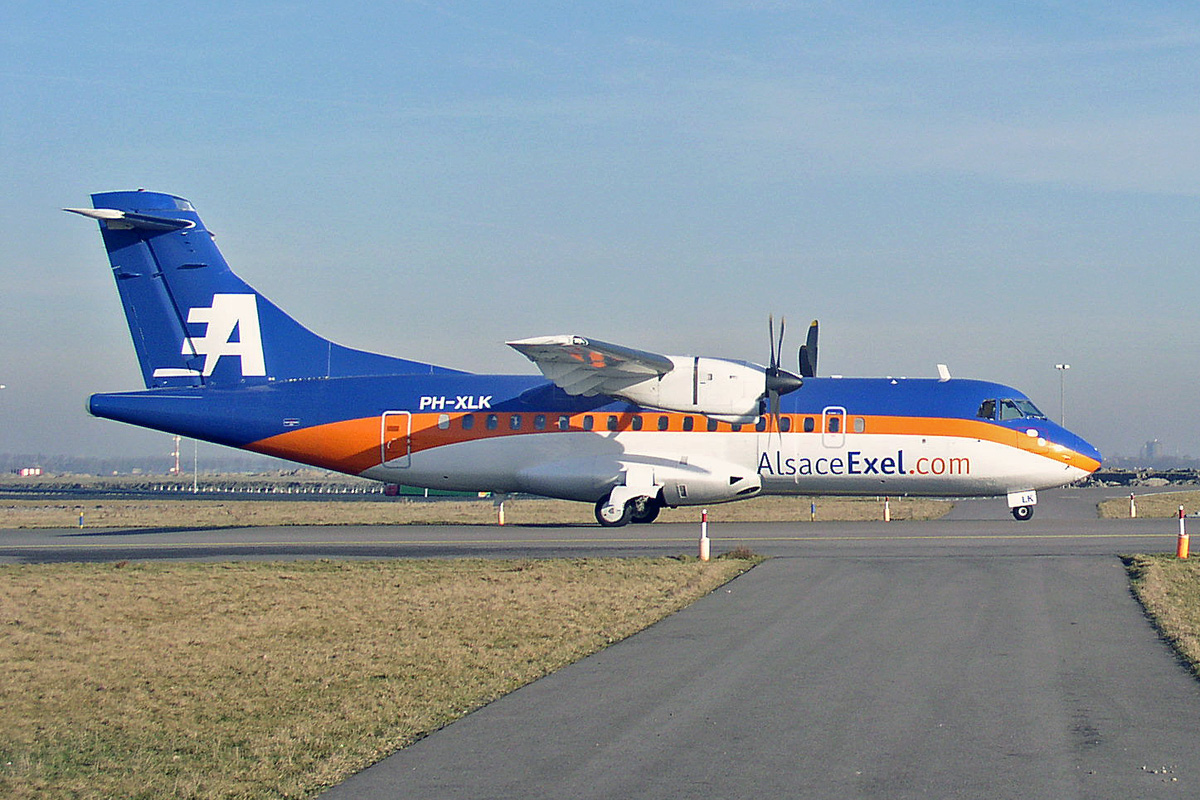
- ATR 42-320
IATA	ICAO	Call sign
XT	-	-
- Founded: March 2004
- Commenced operations: 28 March 2004
- Ceased operations: 31 January 2005
- Hubs: Strasbourg Airport
- Fleet size: 4
- Parent company: ExelAviation Group
- Headquarters: Strasbourg, France
- Website: www.alsaceexel.com

AlsaceExel - also known as Alsace Aviation - was just a trading name based in Strasbourg, France and was an initiative by ExelAviation Group.

== History ==
The brand started operations on March 28, 2004 flying from Strasbourg Airport to Amsterdam and Milan with ATR 42 made available by the parent. The activities lasted for less than a year as they were halted by the Group on 31 January 2005.

== Fleet ==
The AlsaceExel fleet consisted of the following aircraft:

AlsaceExel fleet
Aircraft	In service	Orders	Passengers	Notes
ATR 42-320	2	—	48	Operated by Air Exel Netherlands
ATR 42-500	2	—	48	Operated by Air Exel Netherlands
Total	4	—		

== See also ==
- List of defunct airlines of France
