= Tremblay-en-France =

- Commune
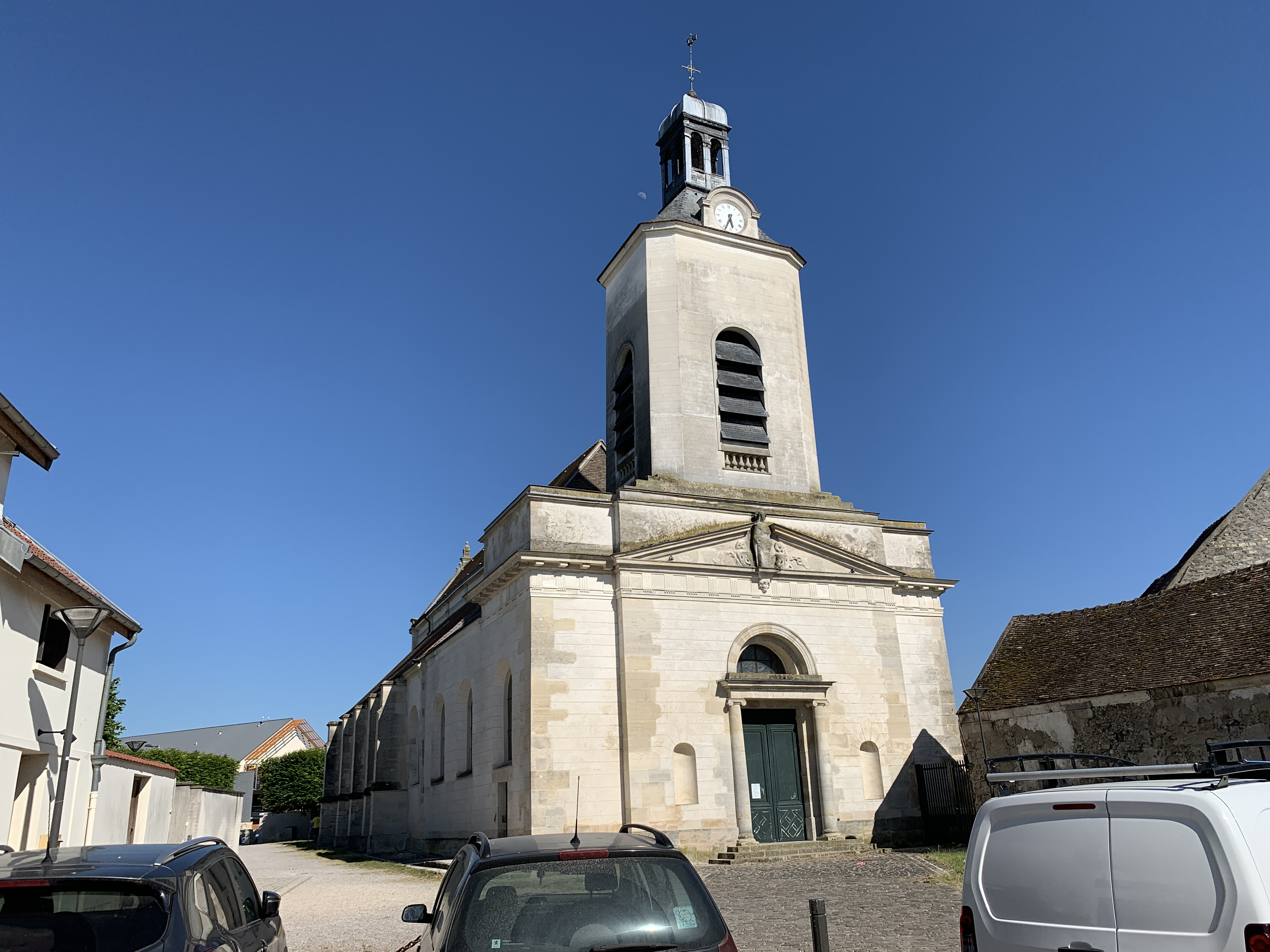
- The Church of Saint-Médard, in Tremblay-en-France

- Coat of arms

- Location (in red) within Paris inner suburbs
- Location of Tremblay-en-France
- Location within France Location within Île-de-France (region)
- Coordinates: 48°57′00″N 2°34′20″E
- Country: France
- Region: Île-de-France
- Department: Seine-Saint-Denis
- Arrondissement: Le Raincy
- Canton: Tremblay-en-France
- Intercommunality: Grand Paris

Government
  - Mayor (2026–32): Virginie De Carvalho
- Area^{1}: 22.44 km^{2} (8.66 sq mi)
- Elevation: 84 m (276 ft)
- Population (2023): 38,348
  - Density: 1,709/km^{2} (4,426/sq mi)
- Demonym: Tremblaysiens
- Time zone: UTC+01:00 (CET)
  - Summer (DST): UTC+02:00 (CEST)
- INSEE/Postal code: 93073 /93290
- Website: www.tremblay-en-france.fr
- ^{1} French Land Register data, which excludes lakes, ponds, glaciers > 1 km^{2} (0.386 sq mi or 247 acres) and river estuaries.

Tremblay-en-France (French pronunciation: [tʁɑ̃blɛ ɑ̃ fʁɑ̃s], lit. 'Tremblay-in-France'; before 1989: Tremblay-lès-Gonesse, lit. 'Tremblay-near-Gonesse') or simply Tremblay is a commune in the northeastern outer suburbs of Paris, France. It is located 19.5 km (12.1 mi) from the centre of Paris, in the Pays de France.

More than one-quarter of Charles de Gaulle Airport lies within the territory of the commune, in particular terminals 2A, 2B, 2C and 2D (the other terminals lie in the territory of other communes). It is the largest, by area, of the so-called petite couronne (inner ring) suburbs of Paris. The corporate head office of Air France and OEMServices lie within Tremblay-en-France.

== Toponymy ==
The name Tremblay derives from the Latin Tremuletum, meaning the 'place of aspen trees'.

== History ==
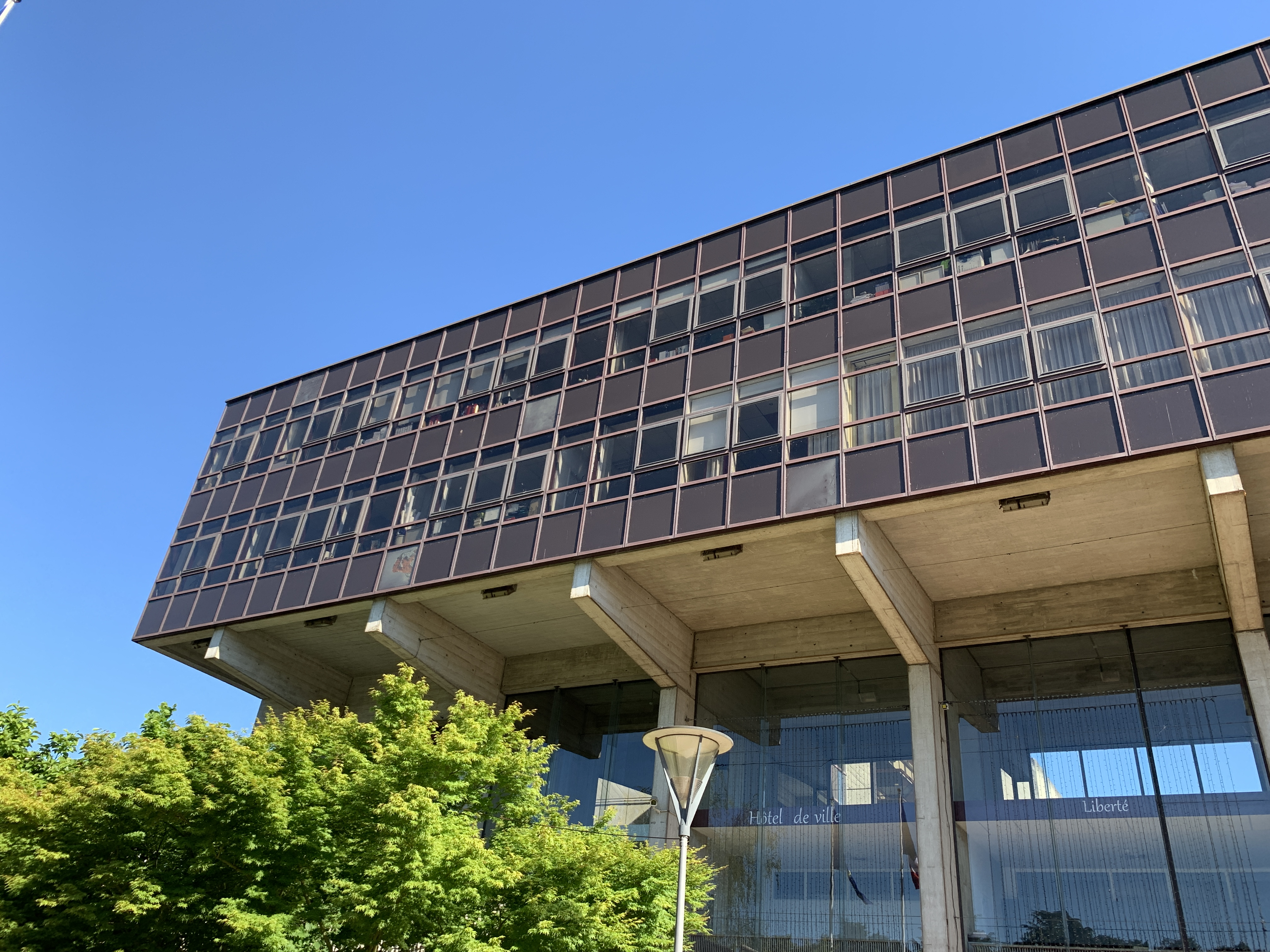
The Hôtel de Ville

The Church of Saint-Médard in Tremblay-en-France is from the 16th century.

Originally called Tremblay-lès-Gonesse (meaning "Tremblay near Gonesse"), the commune was officially renamed Tremblay-en-France (meaning "Tremblay in the pays de France") on 20 August 1989. The modern-day Hôtel de Ville was completed in January 1981.

=== Heraldry ===
Arms of Tremblay-en-France	The arms of Tremblay-en-France are blazoned: Vert chaussé azure, a tau Or between two leaves following the lines of division argent, on a chief Or a demi-lion issuant from the line of division gules.

== Transport ==
The part of Paris-Charles de Gaulle Airport that lies within the territory of the commune of Tremblay-en-France is served by two stations on Paris's Réseau Express Régional (RER) Line B: Aéroport Charles de Gaulle 1 and Aéroport Charles de Gaulle 2 TGV. This last station is an interchange station with TGV national rail lines.

The inhabited area of Tremblay-en-France, however, is served by Vert-Galant station, also on RER B. This station is located at the border between the commune of Tremblay-en-France and the commune of Villepinte, on the Villepinte side of the border.

== Notable residents ==
Notable residents have included:

- Maghnes Akliouche, footballer
- Yakhouba Diawara, basketballer
- Jonathan Joseph-Augustin, footballer

== Economy ==
Head office of Air France in Roissypôle

Air France's head office is located in the Roissypôle complex, on the grounds of Charles de Gaulle Airport and in Tremblay-en-France. The complex opened in December 1995. ASL Airlines France has its head office in the Bâtiment Le Séquoia in the commune. Servair, an Air France subsidiary, has its head office in Continental Square. Paris Aéroport is also headquartered on the airport grounds and in Tremblay.

At one point Virgin Express France (originally named Air Provence Charter), a subsidiary of Virgin Express, had its headquarters in Tremblay.

== Education ==
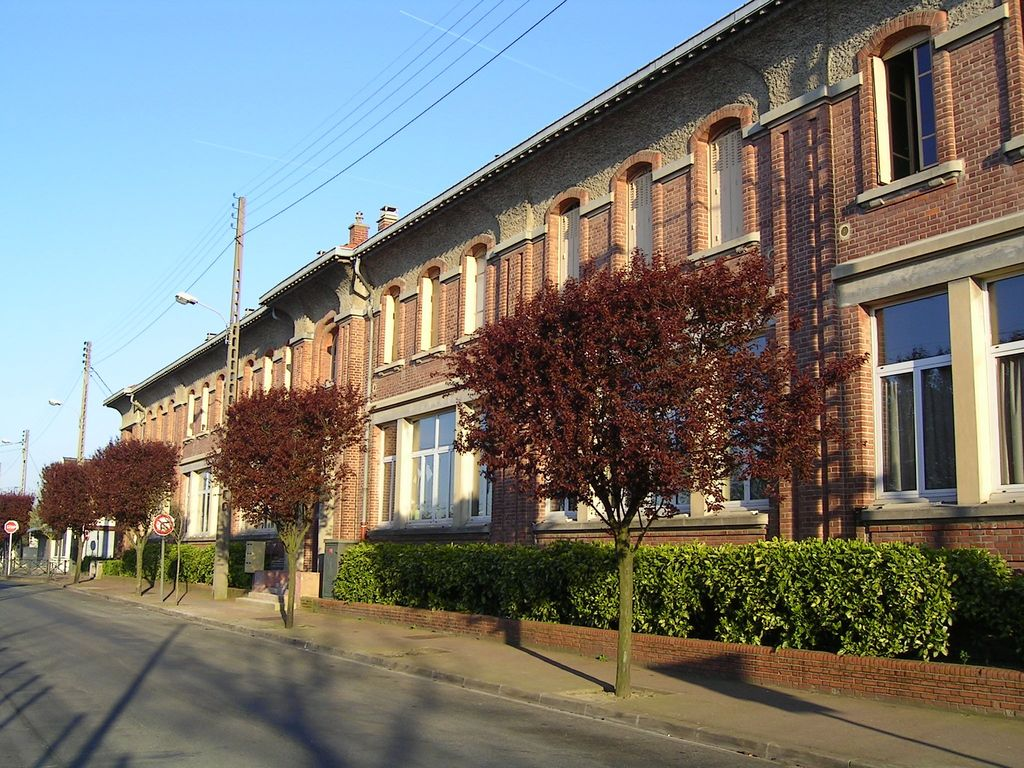
École primaire Jean Jaurès

Tremblay-en-France has 12 écoles maternelles, 14 écoles élémentaires, three collèges, and two lycées. The collèges are Descartes, R. Rolland, and P. de Ronsard. The lycées are Lycée Enseignement Professionnel Hélène Boucher and Lycée Polyvalent Léonard de Vinci. The École Pierre-Brossolette had been targeted for closure, prompting protests from students asking the commune to not have the school closed.

== Demography ==
Historical population

Year	Pop.	±% p.a.
1793	824	—
1821	867	+0.18%
1846	807	−0.29%
1872	735	−0.36%
1901	763	+0.13%
1911	837	+0.93%
1921	842	+0.06%
1926	2,095	+20.00%
1931	4,385	+15.92%
1936	6,181	+7.11%
1946	5,810	−0.62%

Year	Pop.	±% p.a.
1954	9,510	+6.35%
1962	13,788	+4.75%
1968	18,482	+5.00%
1975	26,846	+5.48%
1982	29,644	+1.43%
1990	31,385	+0.72%
1999	33,885	+0.86%
2007	35,410	+0.55%
2012	34,081	−0.76%
2017	36,180	+1.20%
2023	38,348	+0.97%

Source: EHESS and INSEE (1968–2023)

== Sports ==
The local handball team Tremblay Handball plays in the top French division.

== Notable buildings ==
- Church of Saint-Médard

== See also ==
- Communes of the Seine-Saint-Denis department
