= Church of Saint-Médard, Tremblay-en-France =

Church in Tremblay-en-France, Seine-Saint-Denis, France

Church of Saint-Médard
- French: Église Saint-Médard de Tremblay-en-France
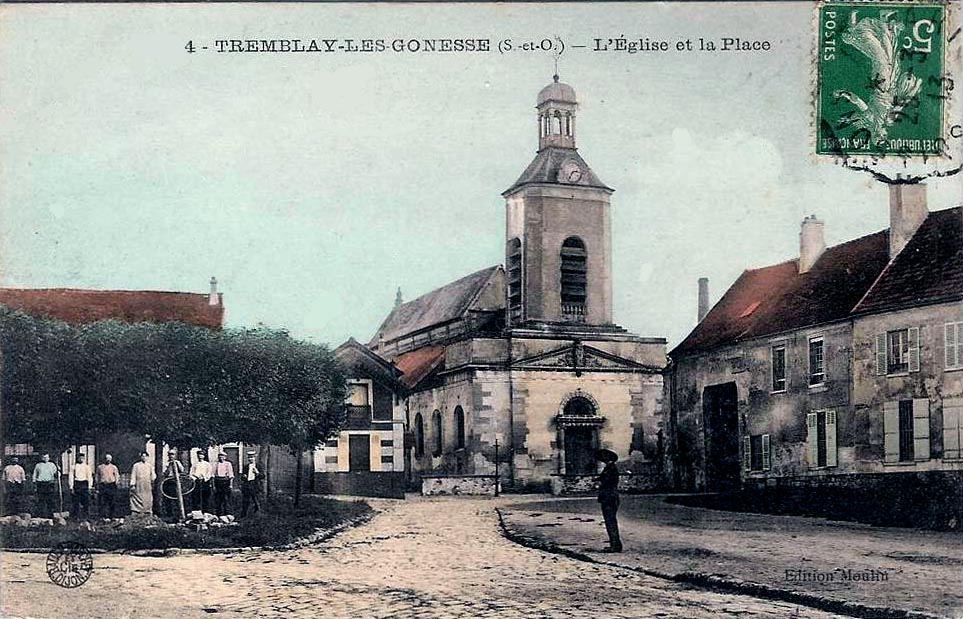

- Location within Paris and the inner ring
- 48°58′47″N 2°33′29″E
- Location: Tremblay-en-France, Seine-Saint-Denis, France
- Country: France
- Denomination: Roman Catholic

History
- Status: Church
- Dedication: Saint Medard

Architecture
- Functional status: Active
- Architectural type: Church

Administration
- Diocese: Saint-Denis

Monument historique
- Official name: Église Saint-Médard
- Criteria: Class MH
- Designated: 12 April 1939
- Reference no.: PA00079965

The Church of Saint-Médard (French: église Saint-Médard) is a Roman Catholic church located in Tremblay-en-France in the department of Seine-Saint-Denis, France. It is dedicated to Saint Medard and listed as a Class Historic Monument.

== History ==
The parish (parochia de Trembleium) was established a long time ago and became the property of Saint-Denis Abbey in the 9th century. A church dedicated to Saint Medard was mentioned in 1163.

Several elements of the foundation are said to date back to the Merovingian period. Three tombs of that time were found on the site.

Several stone blocks from the 13th century were found in the base of the church. However, the choir of the current building dates back to 1543, and the nave to the 18th century.

In 1781, at the request of intendant Louis Bénigne François Bertier de Sauvigny, architect Jacques Cellerier offered to re-build the nave and the belltower without altering the foundations. This project led to further restoration works in the 19th century.

The church of Saint-Médard was listed as a Class Historic Monument in 1939.

The church is adorned with liturgical furniture made by sculptor Jacques Dieudonné: an altar, an ambon, crosses and candlesticks.
