= Lycée Léonard de Vinci (Tremblay-en-France) =

Public high school in France

Information
- Type: Public high school

Lycée Léonard de Vinci is a senior high school/sixth-form college in Tremblay-en-France, Seine-Saint-Denis, France, in the Paris metropolitan area.

In 2002 the school prevented a female student who wore a black jilbab from attending classes.
