= Lycée Hélène Boucher (Tremblay-en-France) =

Coordinates: 48.8480°N 2.4070°E

Lycée Hélène-Boucher

Information
- Type: Public high school

Lycée des métiers Hélène Boucher is a vocational senior high school in Tremblay-en-France, Seine-Saint-Denis, France, in the Paris metropolitan area.

In August 2016 a riot broke out outside of the high school.
