= Virgin Express France =

Airline of France (1995–1999)

Air Provence Charter S.A. Virgin Express France S.A.

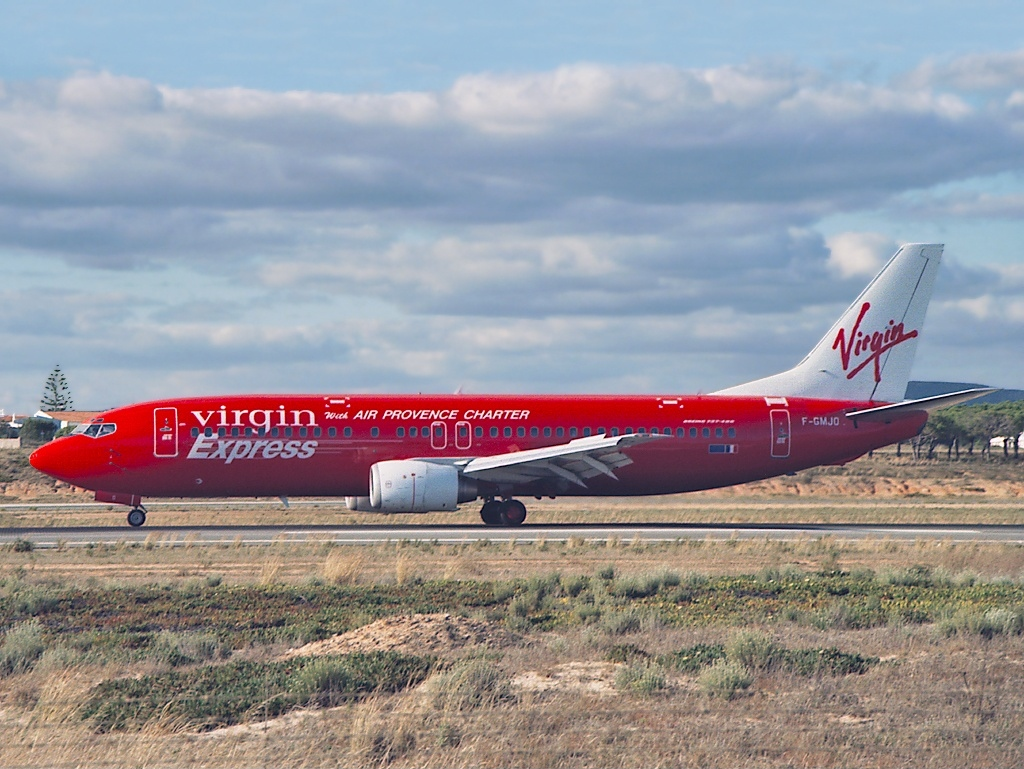
IATA	ICAO	Call sign
DG (1995–1999)	LPU (1995–1998); VEF (1996–1999)	EUROSTAR (1995–1998); LADYBIRD (1996–1999)
- Founded: 11 November 1995 (as Air Provence Charter); 23 April 1996 (as Virgin Express France)
- Ceased operations: 20 March 1998 (as Air Provence Charter); 1 March 1999 (as Virgin Express France)
- Hubs: Charles de Gaulle Airport
- Frequent-flyer program: Flight Club
- Parent company: Virgin Express
- Headquarters: Tremblay-en-France
- Key people: Richard Branson (Chairman of Virgin Group)

Virgin Express France was a French airline subsidiary of the Belgian Virgin Express, with its head office on the grounds of Charles de Gaulle Airport in Tremblay-en-France.

== History ==
The airline was founded as Air Provence Charter on 11 November 1995 as a charter subsidiary of Air Provence International, operating Boeing 737 Classic aircraft. After EuroBelgian Airlines was renamed Virgin Express, Air Provence Charter was renamed Virgin Express France in 1996.

== See also ==
- List of defunct airlines of France
