= Aeris (airline) =

Charter airline of France (1969–2003)

IATA	ICAO	Call sign
SH	AIS	FRANCE CHARTER
- Founded: 1969 (as Air Toulouse)
- Ceased operations: 2003
- Hubs: Toulouse–Blagnac Airport
- Fleet size: 7
- Headquarters: Toulouse, France
- Website: www.aeris.fr

Aeris was an airline company based in Toulouse, France. It was founded in 1969 and was defunct in 2003 after being unable to raise additional capital.

Aeris offered charter flights until 2003, after acquiring 7,612 slots at Orly Airport due to the bankruptcy of Air Liberté. Aeris took on passengers as a low-cost carrier, competing with EasyJet and Air France for flights between Paris and south of France. Aeris aimed for business travelers, but was only able to fill about 60% of their seat capacity. In 2003, the company missed a government deadline to raise extra capital which was extended in August 2003, with the airline hoping to raise 15m euros in the following weeks from a mixture of foreign and domestic investors. At Paris, Aeris' 12,092 annual slots were redistributed after the bankruptcy.

After rebranding as Aeris, the company began operation with a small fleet of Boeing 737-300 aircraft and 767-300 aircraft. These were generally operated in an all-economy configuration.

Aeris operated many scheduled services with fixed timetables. However, the airline soon branched out into charter services.

== Gallery ==
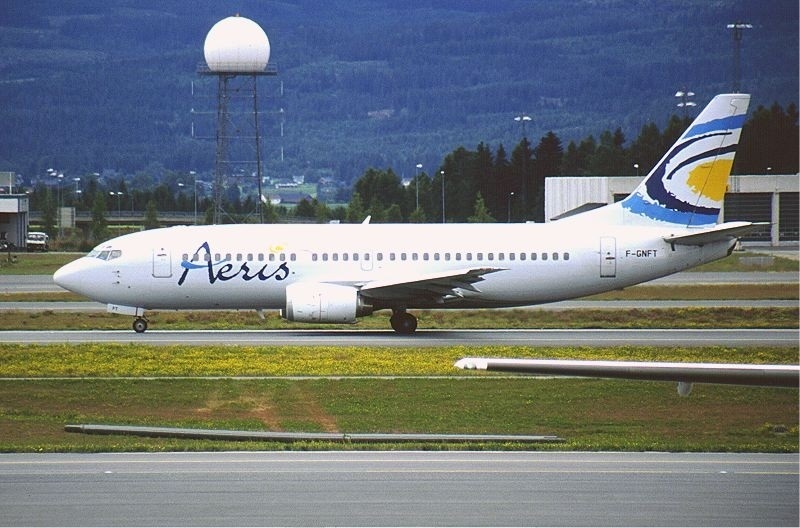
An Aeris Boeing 737-300

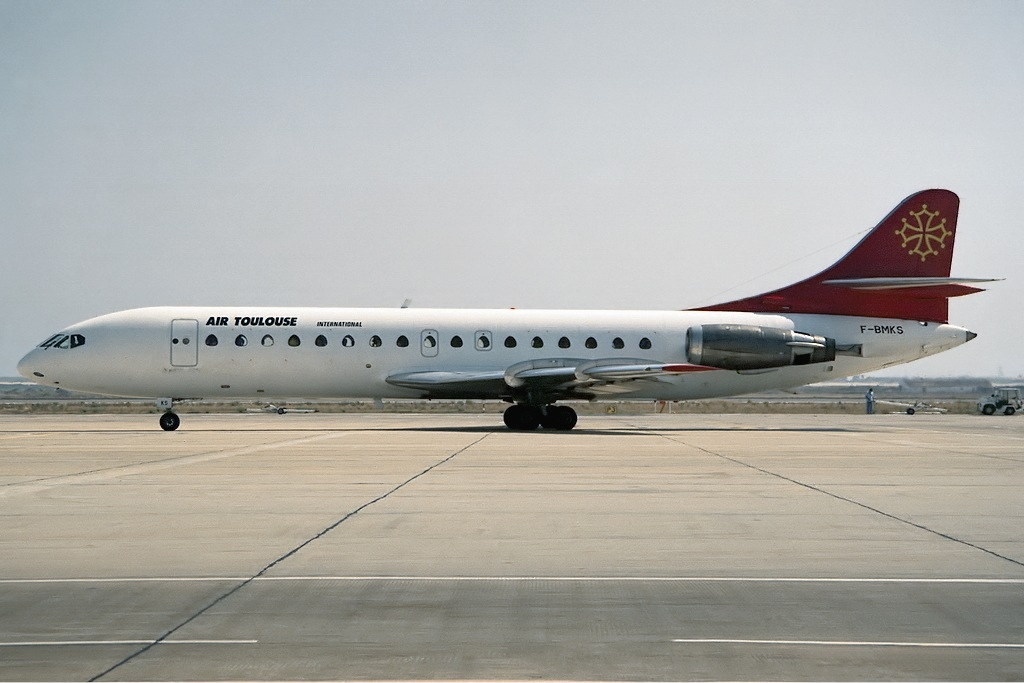
Air Toulouse International Sud Aviation Caravelle

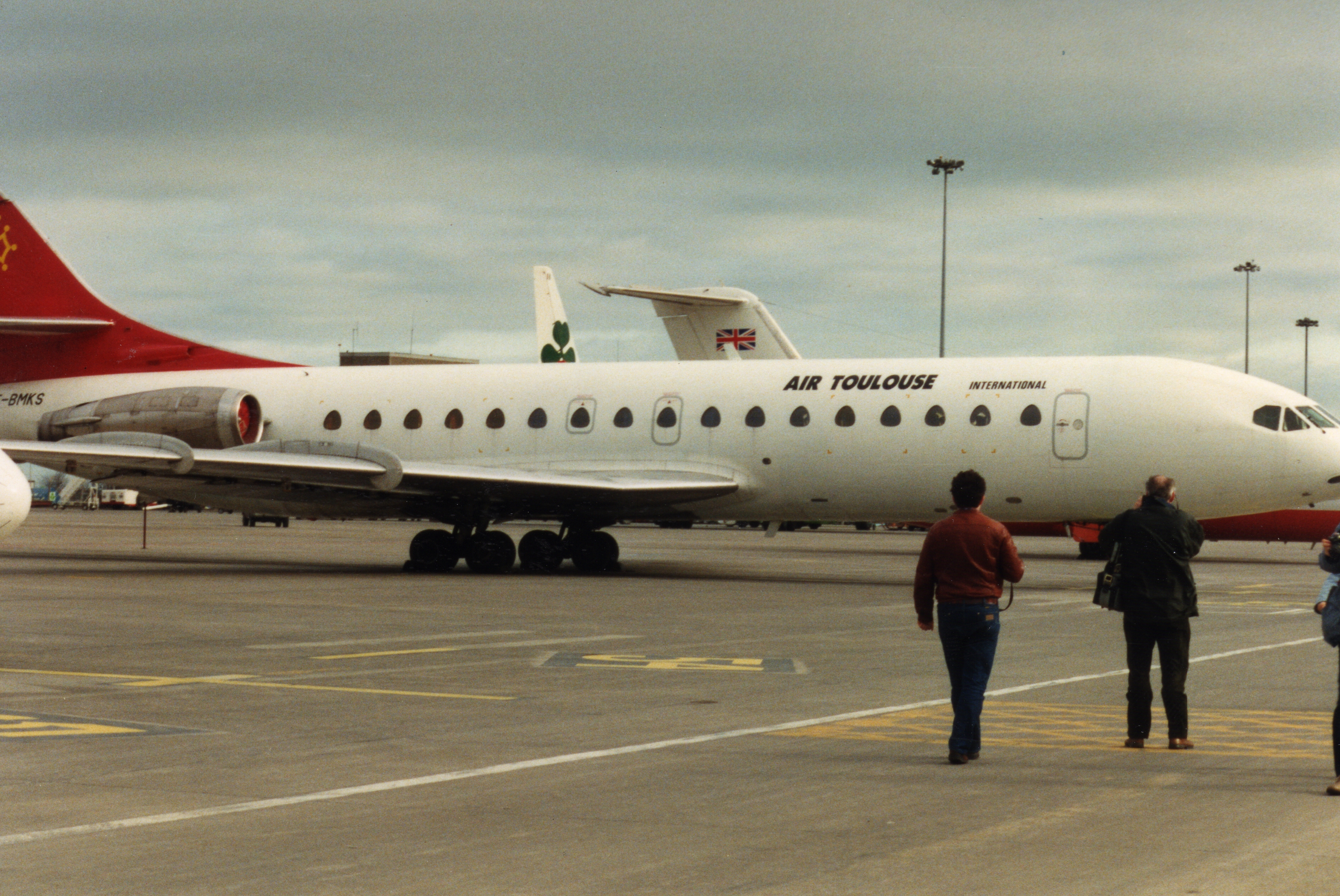
Air Toulouse International Sud Aviation Caravelle in 1993

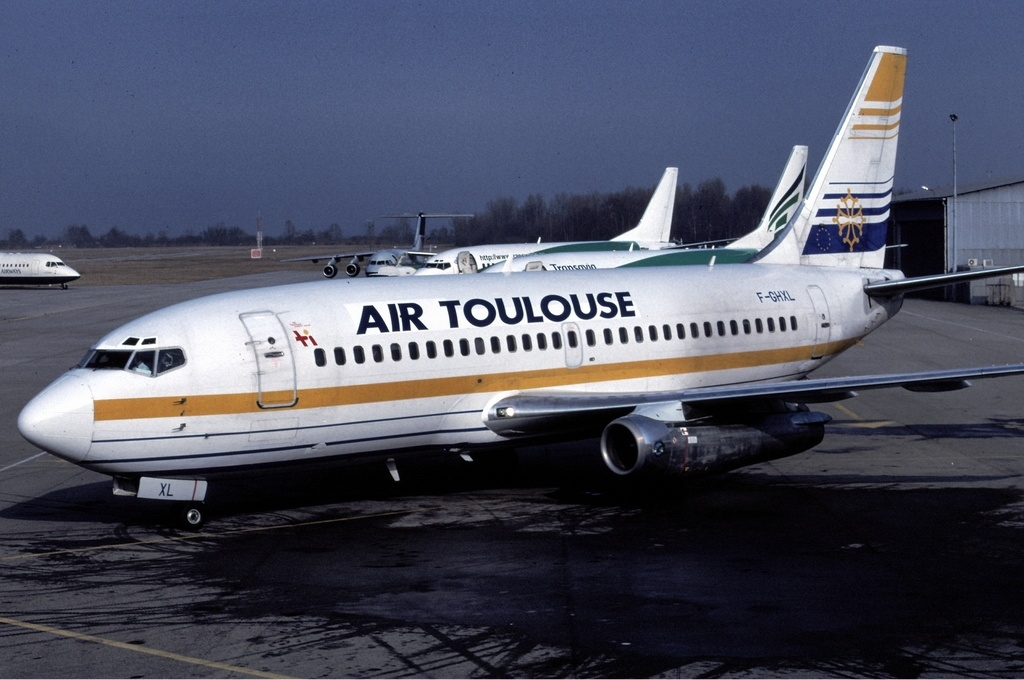
Air Toulouse International Boeing 737-200 in 1997
