= Air Turquoise =

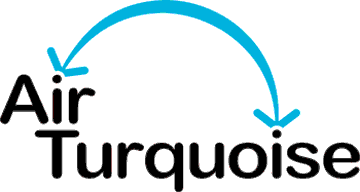

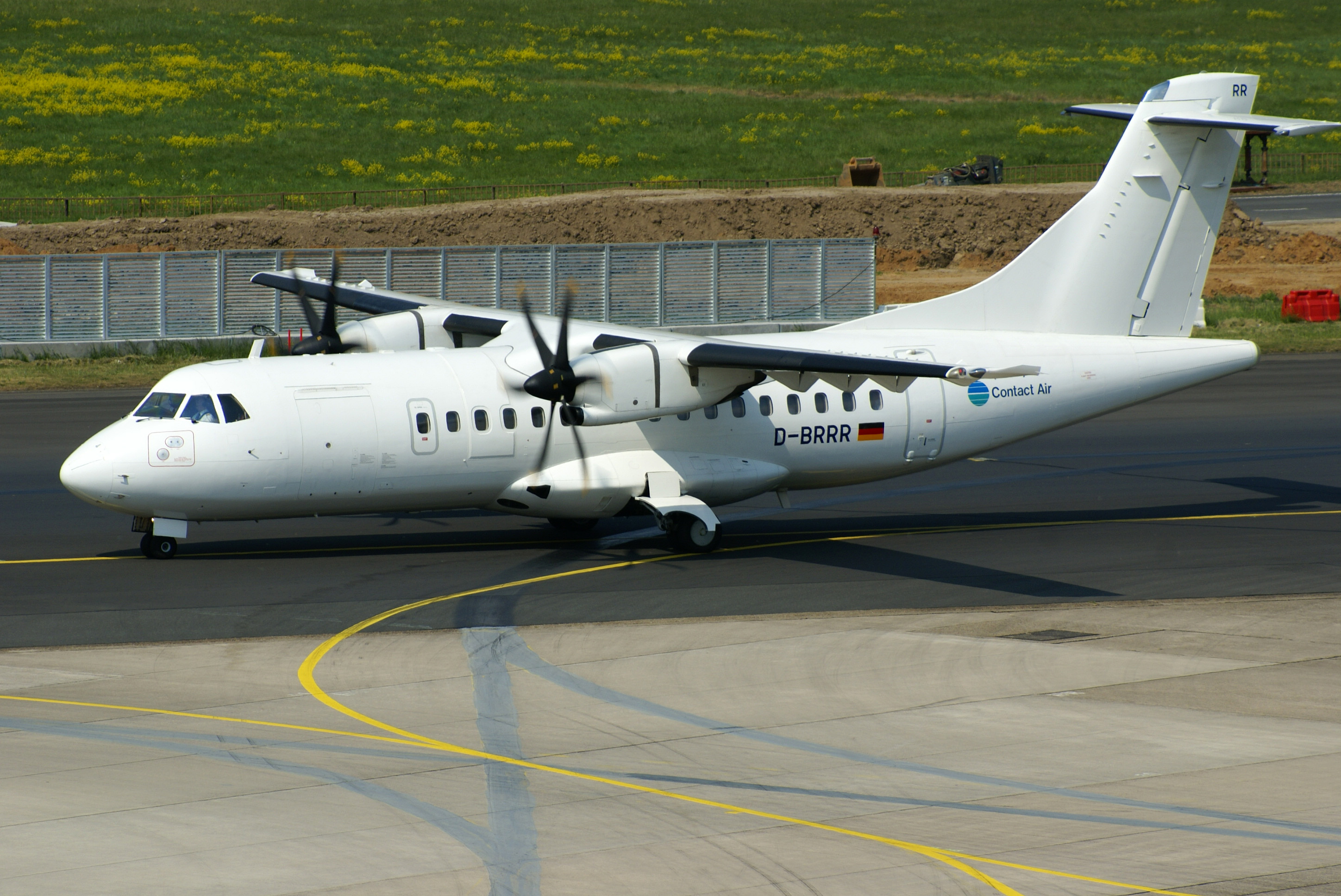
- ATR 42-500
IATA	ICAO	Call sign
—	RTQ	—
- Founded: June 2005
- Ceased operations: August 2006
- Operating bases: Vatry International Airport
- Fleet size: 1
- Destinations: London, Bordeaux, Marseille
- Website: airturquoise.com

Air Turquoise was a low-cost airline based in France. It operated services to Marseille, Nice and Bordeaux from Reims Champagne Airport. The airline was liquidated on 2 August 2006.

== History ==
The airline was founded on 21 June 2005 by some ex Air Littoral employees who believed there were promising conditions to reactivate an airline, no longer in the Provence-Alpes-Côte d'Azur region but in that of Reims, with an estimated population of 1 million inhabitants. It began daily flights on June 24, 2005 from Reims-Béthény airport to Bordeaux, Marseille and Nice with a 5-year-old ATR 42-500. The flight between Reims and Bordeaux was opened in view of the numerous business links between the two capitals of the French wine industry. From April 2006, Air Turquoise operated daily flights between Reims and London Luton airport and operated the Bordeaux route alternately with Toulouse. The routes between Nice and Marseille were daily.

On 28 June, the company relocated from Reims due to the airport's closure and began operating flights from Vatry International Airport (70 kilometers far from Reims) but had overlooked the fact that the airport's runway lacked the infrastructure necessary for landings in adverse weather conditions. On July 19, the Reims Commercial Court ordered the judicial liquidation of the young low-cost airline, which employed twenty-nine people, and cancelled all its flights. However, it had authorization to continue operating until July 31st in order to facilitate a possible resumption of activity. On August 2, lacking a buyer, the company ceased operations, leaving all employees without work, with a debt of nearly €uros 400,000.

== Destinations ==
Air Turquoise flew to the following destinations:

- Bordeaux (Aéroport de Bordeaux Mérignac)
- London (London Luton Airport)
- Marseille (Marseille Provence Airport)
- Nice (Côte d'Azur International Airport)
- Reims (Vatry International Airport) HUB
- Toulouse (Toulouse Blagnac International Airport)
