= Twin Jet =

French airline

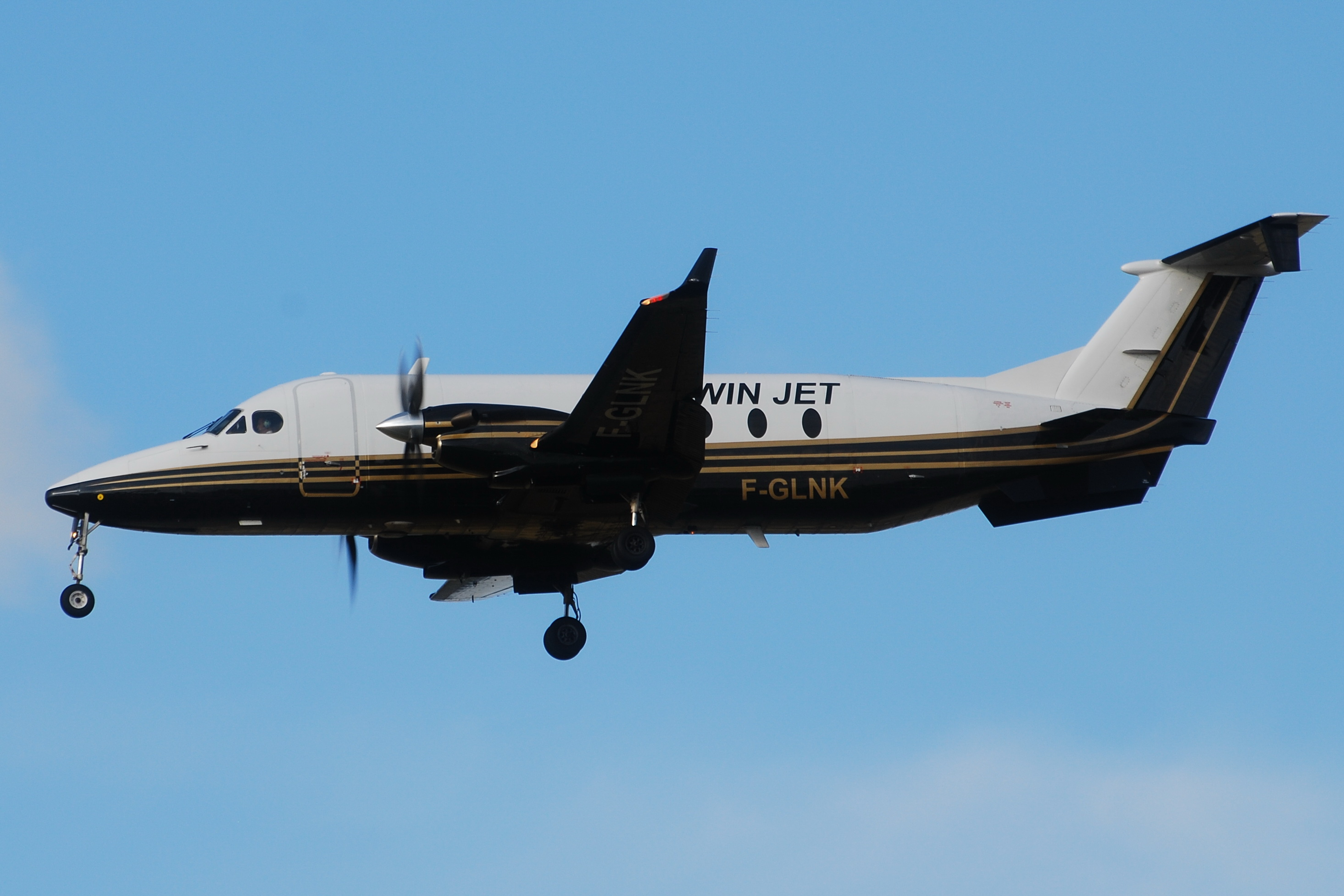
- Beechcraft 1900D
IATA	ICAO	Call sign
T7	TJT	TWINJET
- Founded: 2001
- Focus cities: Marseille Provence Airport; Lyon–Saint Exupéry Airport; Toulouse-Blagnac Airport
- Frequent-flyer program: Flying Blue
- Fleet size: 13
- Destinations: 11
- Headquarters: Aix-en-Provence, France
- Key people: Olivier Manaut; Eric Moret
- Website: twinjet.fr

Twin Jet is a French regional airline based in Aix-en-Provence.

== History ==
Twin Jet was founded in May 2001 and started operations in the month of October of that same year. It operated its first scheduled flight in March 2002. The company operates 250 flights a week mainly on domestic routes within France as well as to Bologna, Venice and Milan in Italy as its only foreign destinations. Its activity is complemented by business aviation and charter flights.

In early January 2017, Twin Jet took over French competitor Hex'Air and integrated its routes and aircraft.

== Destinations ==
As of April 2026, Twin Jet serves the following destinations:

=== France ===
- Le Puy-en-Velay – Le Puy–Loudes Airport base
- Lyon – Lyon–Saint Exupéry Airport base
- Marseille – Marseille Provence Airport base
- Mende – Mende Brenoux Airport
- Nantes – Nantes Airport
- Nice – Nice Airport
- Paris – Paris Orly Airport
- Pau – Pau Airport
- Rennes – Rennes Airport
- Strasbourg – Strasbourg Airport base
- Toulouse – Toulouse-Blagnac Airport base

=== Italy ===
- Milan – Malpensa Airport
- Bologna – Bologna Airport
- Venice – Venice Airport
- Olbia – Olbia Airport

=== Spain ===
- Menorca – Menorca Airport

== Fleet ==
=== Current fleet ===
As of July 2026, Twin Jet operates the following aircraft:

Twin Jet fleet
Aircraft	Total	Orders	Passengers
Beechcraft 1900D	13	—	18
Total	13		

=== Former fleet ===
As of August 2025, Twin Jet operated 13 Beech 1900D.

== Maintenance ==
Maintenance is overseen by Kerozen Industrie.
