= Flywest =

- Commenced operations: 2004
- Ceased operations: 2005
- Operating bases: Brest Bretagne Airport
- Fleet size: See Fleet below
- Destinations: See Services below
- Headquarters: Brest, France

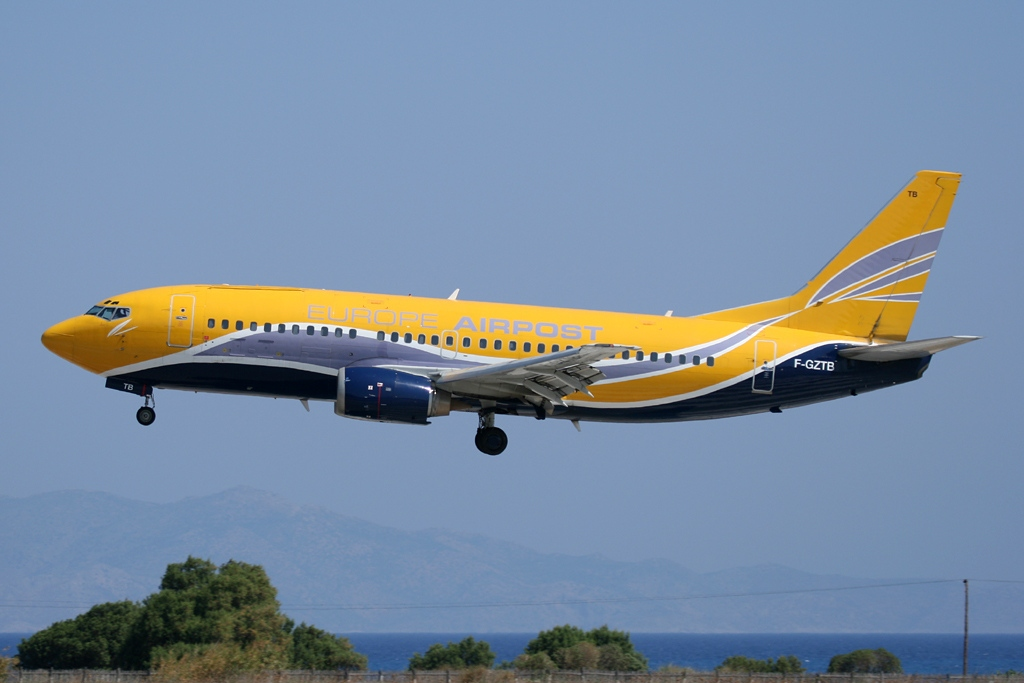
Boeing 737-300 leased from Europe Airpost

Flywest was an airline based in Brest, France. It operated scheduled services using aircraft from Europe Airpost. Its main base was Brest Bretagne Airport. In 2005 the airline declared bankruptcy.

== History ==
The airline was established on March 30, 2004, and started operations on June 2, 2004. It was owned by JLA (Jean-Louis Aze) Consulting (51%) and Guylot Environment (49%). Their services were suspended in September 2005.

== Services ==
Flywest operated the following services in January 2005:

- Domestic scheduled destinations: Ajaccio, Brest, Chambéry, Paris and Toulon.
- International scheduled destinations: Cork.

== Fleet ==
The Flywest fleet consisted of 1 Boeing 737-300 aircraft (from Europe Airpost) in January 2005.
