= Air Atlantique (France) =

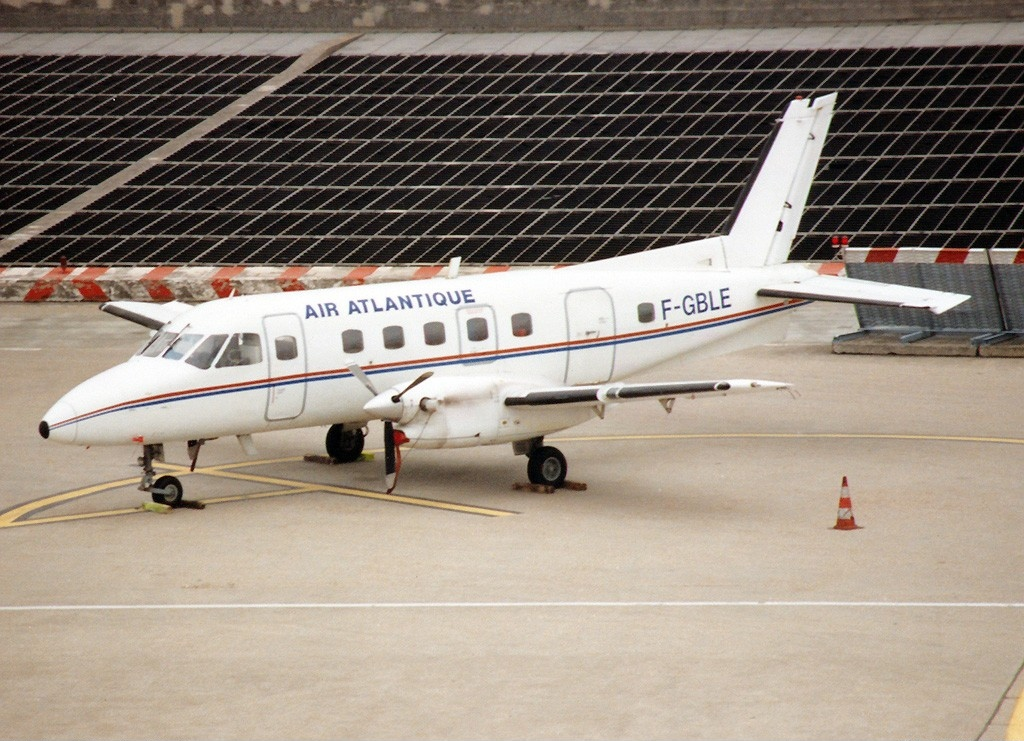
- Embraer EMB 110 Bandeirante
IATA	ICAO	Call sign
V6	APB	CHARENTE
- Founded: 1963
- Ceased operations: 2004

Air Atlantique was a French passenger and cargo airline, which was founded in 1988 out of a small private entreprise named Air Publicité-Air Atlantique. The headquarters were in picturesque La Rochelle city and the operational base at the nearby Laleu airport. At the beginning only air-taxi and ad hoc charter operations were performed. Due to the base's geographic location, operations attracted a variety of customers, and in the following years the compay enlarged. Firstly it changed the corporate name to Air Atlantique S.A. on 2 December 1988. Management realized that it was time to launch scheduled flights. These began in the following year with a Cherbourg-Paris route and were operated in collaboration with the larger airline AOM. An appropriate Brazilian manufactured EMB-110 Bandeirante entered the fleet. In 1993 the first ATR 42 turboprop was bought (in total seven will be purchased) and it was reserved for these flights and especially for the busy Royan-Paris (Orly) route. They were later followed by a single, more capacious ATR 72. Despite AOM's support, total traffic never reached the expected levels, and scheduled flights were discontinued in 1997, leaving Air Atlantique to operate charter flights only. With the aim of reviving scheduled operations, in November 2002 Seine-Maritime Council acquired a 70% stake in the company. These were resumed in May 2003 with a Toulouse-Le Havre-Rouen route but the results were negligible as those of others opened a little bit later on. In January 2004, the airline went into temporary administration, and all operations ceased at the beginning of April due to bankruptcy.

== Fleet ==
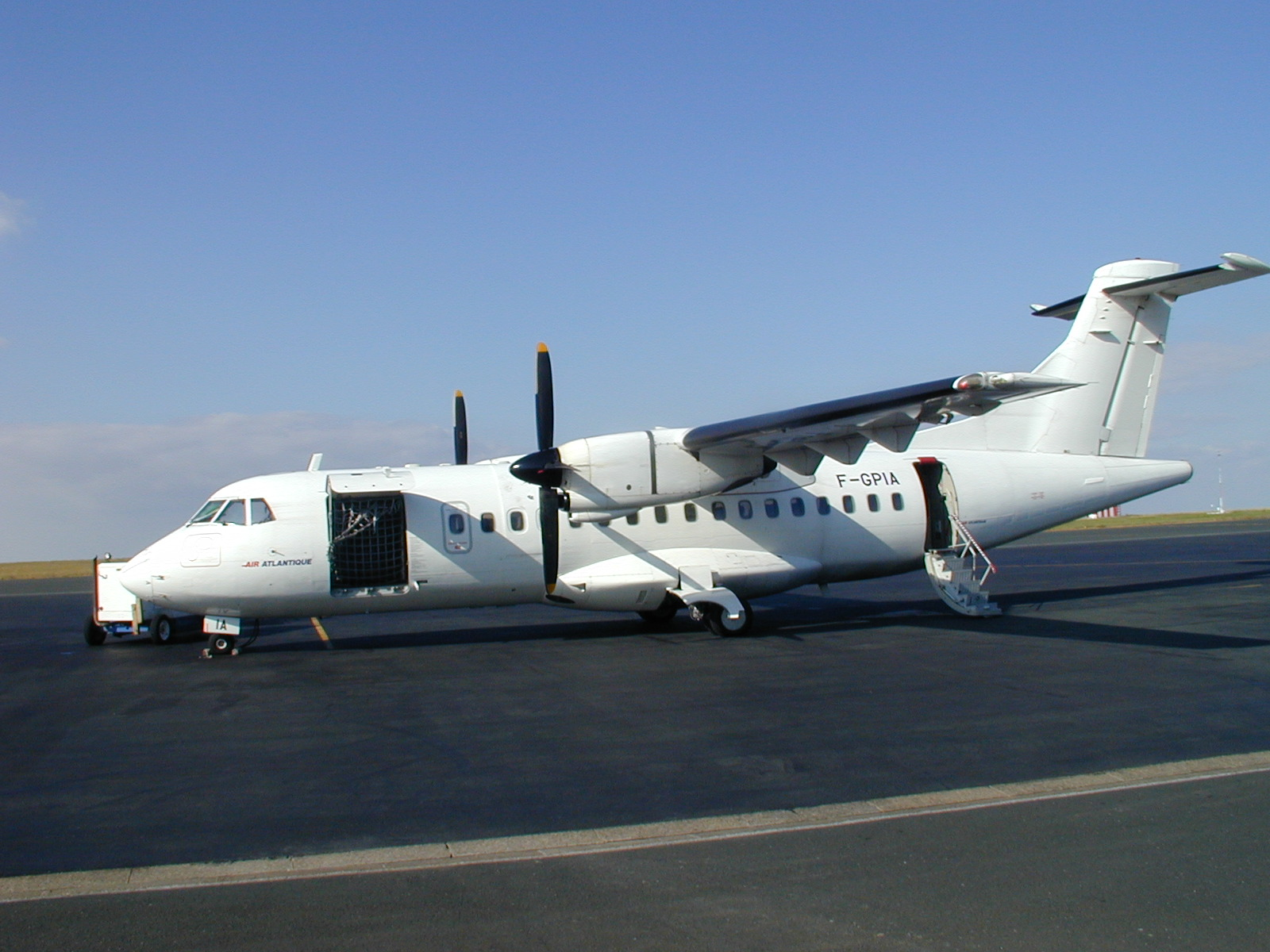
ATR 42

Over the years, Air Atlantique operated the following aircraft types:

Aircraft	Introduced	Retired
ATR 42	1992	2004
ATR 72	2003	2004
Beechcraft King Air 90		
Beechcraft Super King Air 200		
Embraer EMB 110 Bandeirante		
Piper PA-23 Aztec		
Piper PA-31-350 Navajo Chieftain		
