= New Axis Airways =

Airline in France (1999–2009)

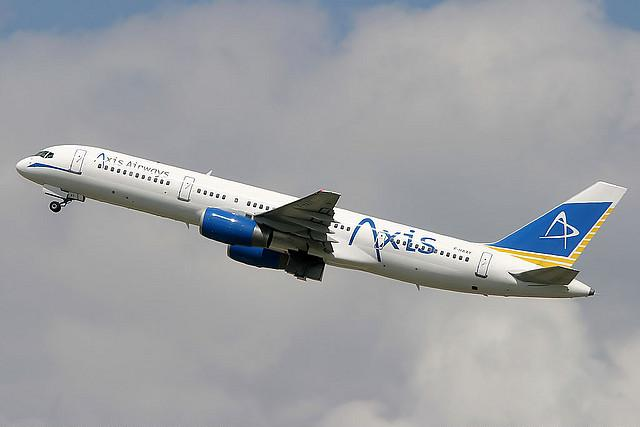
- Boeing 757-200
IATA	ICAO	Call sign
9X (6V Axis Airways)	AXY	AXIS
- Founded: november 1999 as Axis Partners
- Ceased operations: 7 December 2009
- Hubs: Paris-Charles de Gaulle Airport, Marseille Provence Airport
- Fleet size: 3
- Destinations: 9
- Parent company: ISF and Private Investors
- Headquarters: Marseille

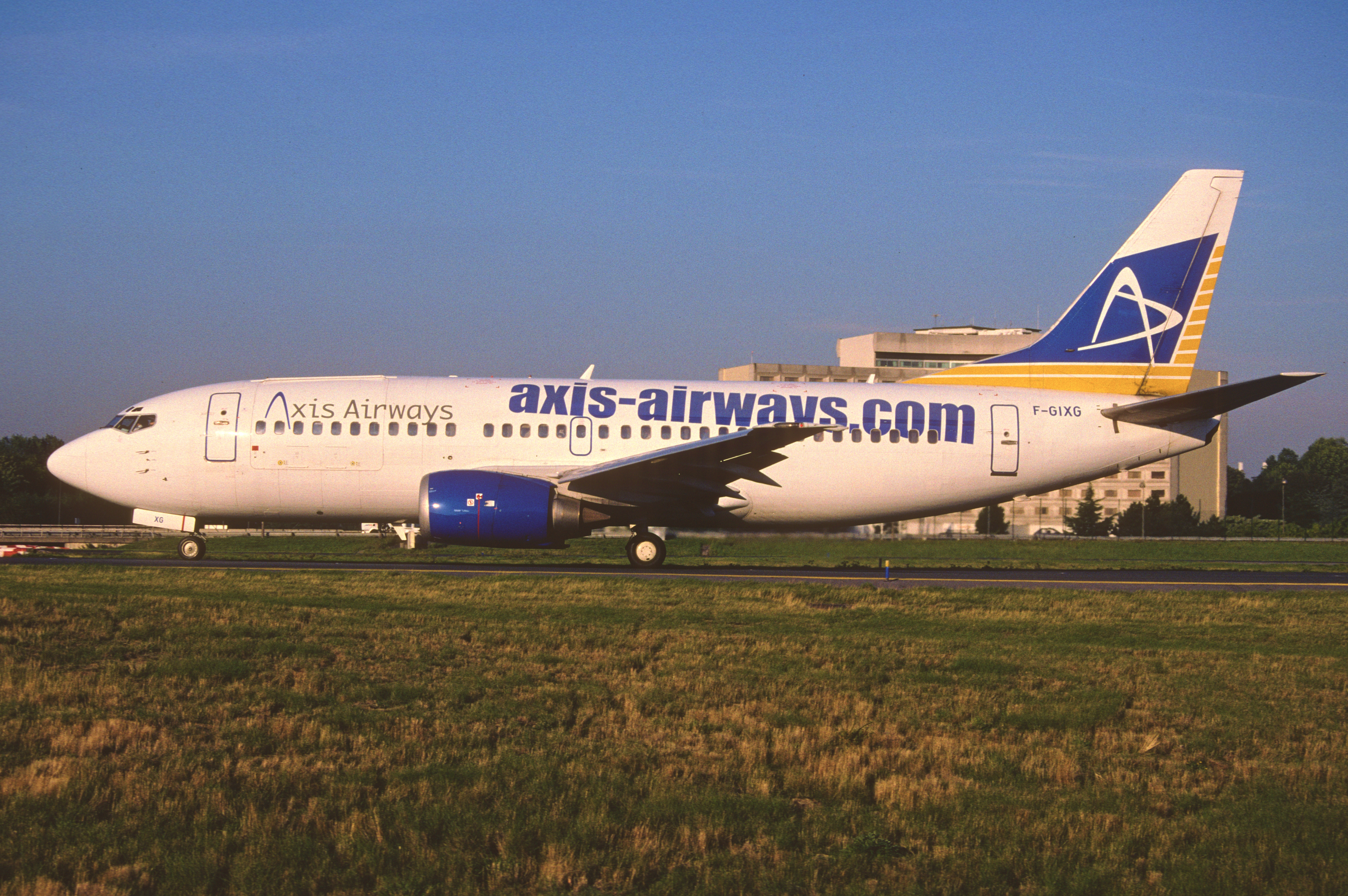
Axis Airways Boeing 737-300

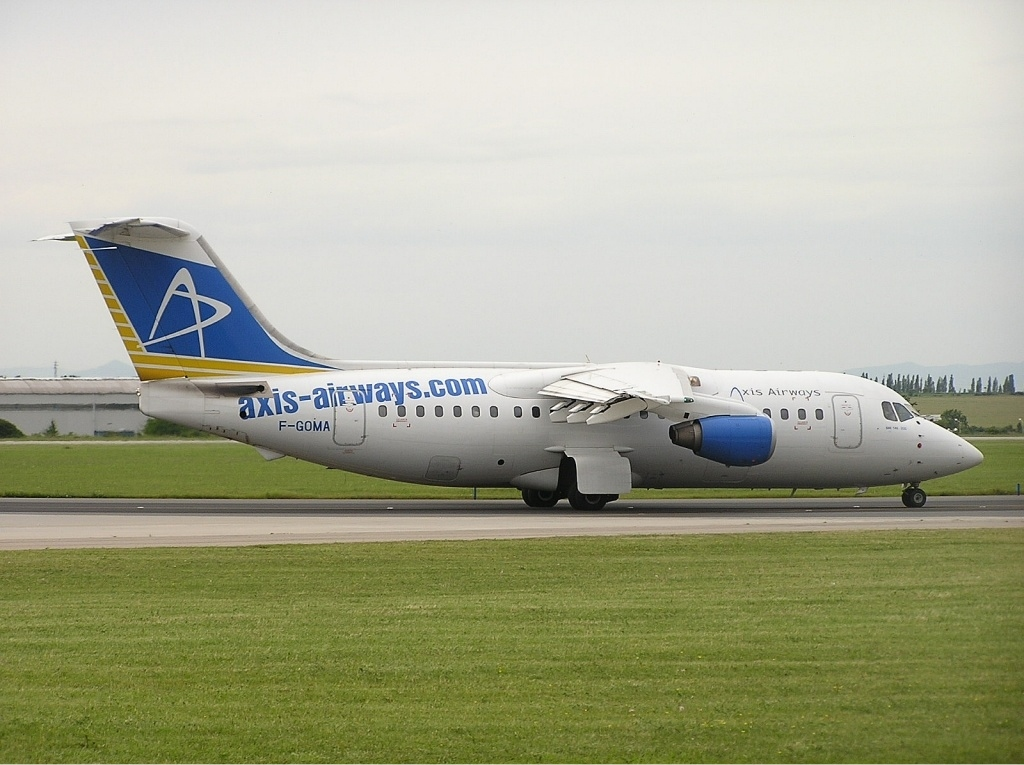
Axis Airways BAe 146-200QC

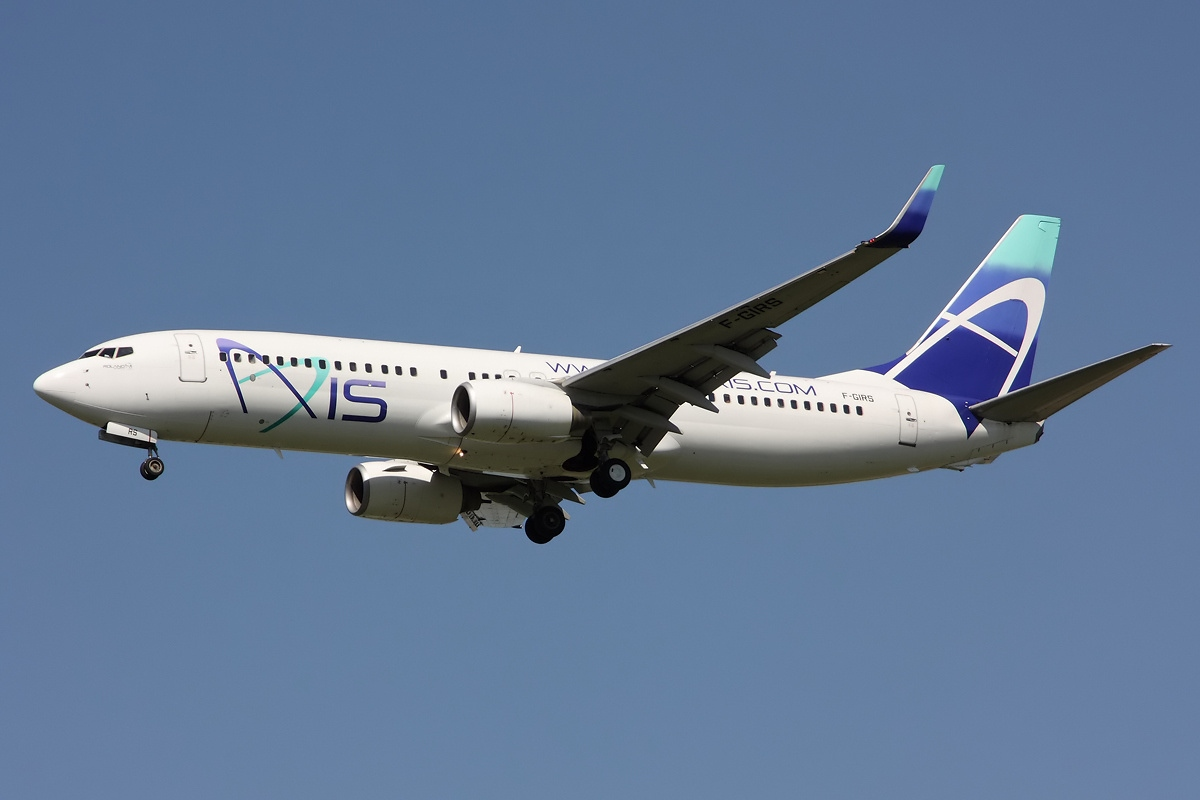
New Axis Airways Boeing 737-800

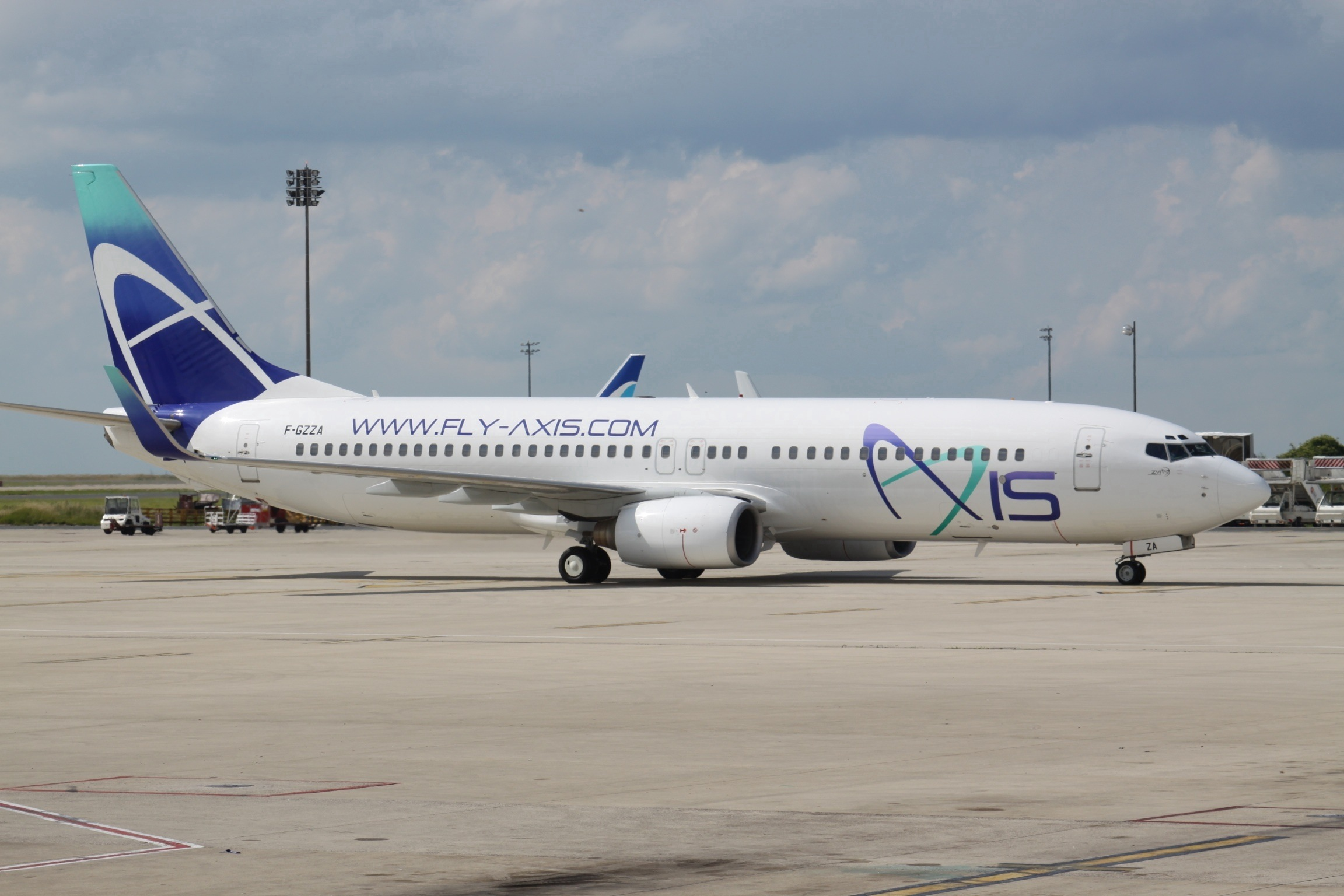
Axis Compagnie Aérienne Française Boeing 737-800

Axis had a particularly turbulent history marked by several corporate name and brand changes.

== History ==
The airline was founded in November 1999 with the incorporation of a commercial company under the name Axis Partners. The first cargo flight took place a month later, and the first passenger charter flight the following January. The operational headquarters were permanently relocated to Marseille Airport. In April, ownership of Sinair company, dedicated to private flights and small charters, was acquired. Its assets gave life to the following airline.

In early 2001, the company name was changed to Axis Airways, and the first charter flight took place in April. The first transatlantic freight flight also took place that same year. In 2005 it was the first French airline to equip with Boeing 757. In 2006, the airline became part of the Axis Airways Group but black clouds were over the horizon. In October, the company was declared insolvent and filed for bankruptcy with the Aix-en-Provence Commercial Court, which decided on a six-month observation period and a judicial administrator. Flight operations were halted.

On 1st December 2006, the Conseil Supérieur de l'Aviation Marchande (Higher Council for Commercial Aviation) issued the permit to continue activities under New Axis Airways name. It found a funding through a group of investors, which included Arkia Israel Airlines (20%). These new shareholders were bringing 4 million €uros of fresh capital plus another 4 as a guarantee. In that month 73 employees were on the payroll. The company hoped to be able to bring in three new generation jetliners in September 2007, such as Boeing 737-800s. Thanks also to the support of Arkia, at the end of the year the company launched Marseille-Tel Aviv air link and then, in March 2008, Paris CDG-Tel Aviv and Toulouse-Tel Aviv. In late spring, the company underwent a comprehensive restructuring and continued its conversion into a scheduled airline, such for Marseille-Casablanca route. In the first half of 2009, the airline continued its operations. This was a brief interlude, as in September it ceased all scheduled flights and announced its commitment to the charter market only.

The Axis Compagnie Aérienne Française or FlyAxis project was very short-lived. Despite the rental of two B737-800s, some charter flights, and scheduled flights to Tel Aviv the airline ceased flight operations on 16 November. Four days later the company announced a lack of funding, and on December 7, the company's liquidation was made official..

== Services ==
New Axis Airways operated services to

- Marseille – Marseille Provence Airport Hub
- Paris – Charles de Gaulle Airport Hub
- Luxor – Luxor Airport
- Hurghada – Hurghada Airport
- Cairo – Cairo International Airport
- Tel Aviv – Ben Gurion International Airport
- Faro – Faro Airport
- Heraklion – Heraklion International Airport
- Eilat – Ovda International Airport
