= Le Puy–Loudes Airport =

Le Puy–Loudes Airport Aéroport du Puy-en-Velay–Loudes
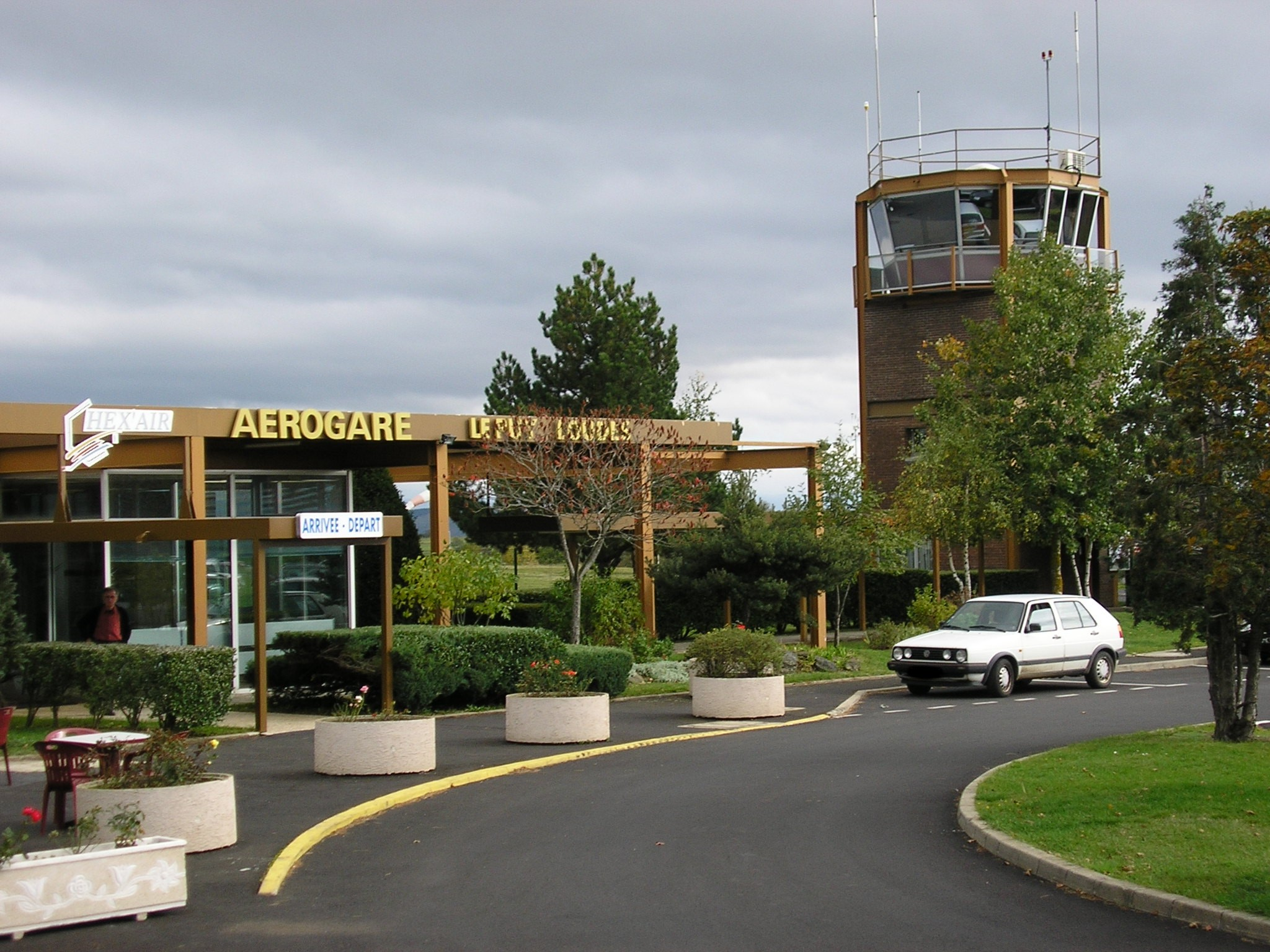
- IATA: LPY; ICAO: LFHP

Summary
- Airport type: Public
- Operator: Association de l'aérodrome départemental Le Puy en Velay
- Serves: Le Puy-en-Velay, France
- Location: Loudes, France
- Elevation AMSL: 2,731 ft / 832 m
- Coordinates: 45°04′47″N 03°45′48″E

Map
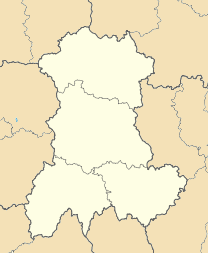
- Location of airport in Auvergne region LFHP (France)

Runways
Direction	Length		Surface
Direction	m	ft	Surface
15/33	1,393	4,570	Asphalt
15R/33L	940	3,084	Grass
- Source: French AIP

Le Puy–Loudes Airport (IATA: LPY, ICAO: LFHP) is an airport located in Loudes and 10 km west-northwest of Le Puy-en-Velay, both communes of the Haute-Loire département in the Auvergne région of France.

== Airlines and destinations ==
The following airlines operate regular scheduled and charter flights at Le Puy–Loudes Airport:

Airlines	Destinations
Twin Jet	Paris–Orly

The nearest international airport is Lyon–Saint-Exupéry Airport, which is located 161 km (100 mi) north east of Le Puy–Loudes Airport.
