= Virgin Express =

Airline of Belgium (1996–2007)

N.V. Virgin Express S.A.

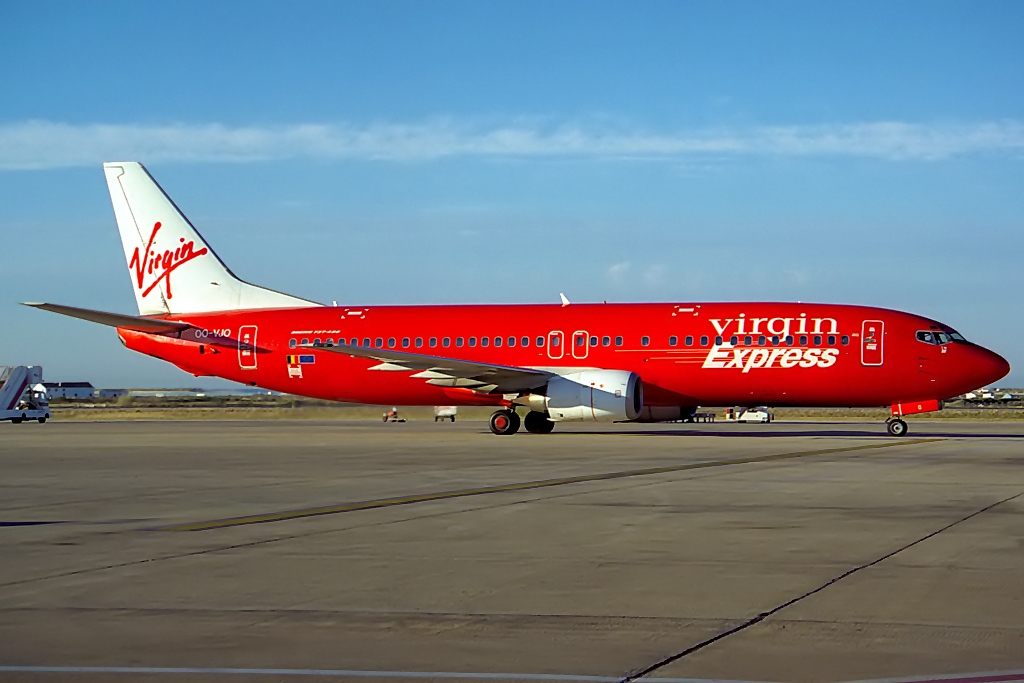
- Boeing 737-400
IATA	ICAO	Call sign
BQ (1991–1996); TV (1996–2007)	EBA (1991–1996); VEX (1996–2007)	BELSTAR (1991–1996); VIRGIN EXPRESS (1996–2007)
- Founded: November 1991 (as EBA - EuroBelgian Airlines); 23 April 1996 (as Virgin Express)
- Commenced operations: 1 April 1992 (as EBA - EuroBelgian Airlines); 1 August 1996 (as Virgin Express)
- Ceased operations: 1 August 1996 (as EBA - EuroBelgian Airlines); 25 March 2007 (as Virgin Express; merged with SN Brussels Airlines to form Brussels Airlines)
- Hubs: Brussels Airport
- Frequent-flyer program: Flight Club
- Subsidiaries: Virgin Express France (1996–1999); Virgin Express Ireland (1998–2001)
- Parent company: Virgin Group (1996–2004); SN Airholding (2004–2007)
- Headquarters: Brussels Airport, Zaventem, Belgium
- Key people: Richard Branson (chairman of Virgin Group)

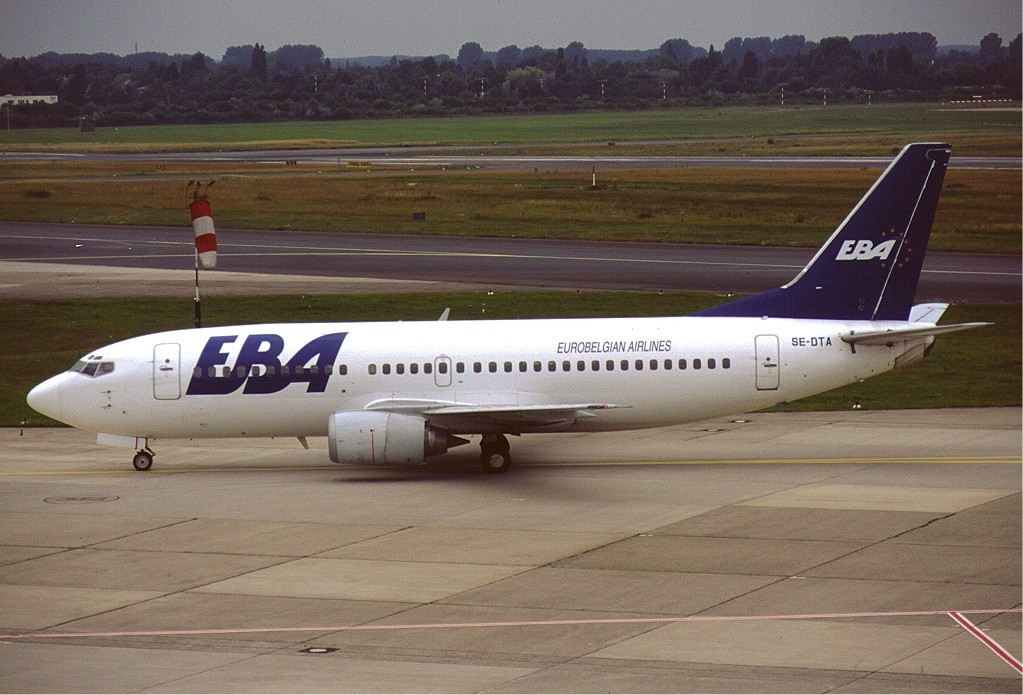
Eurobelgian Airlines Boeing 737-300

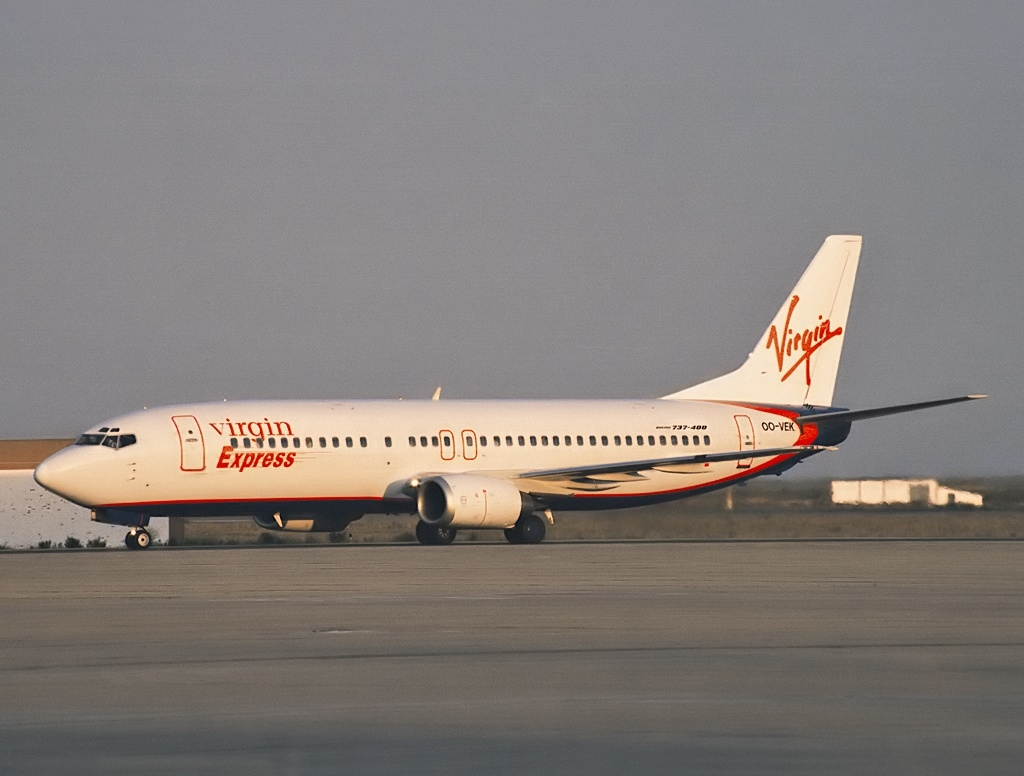
A Boeing 737-400 at Faro Airport in 1999

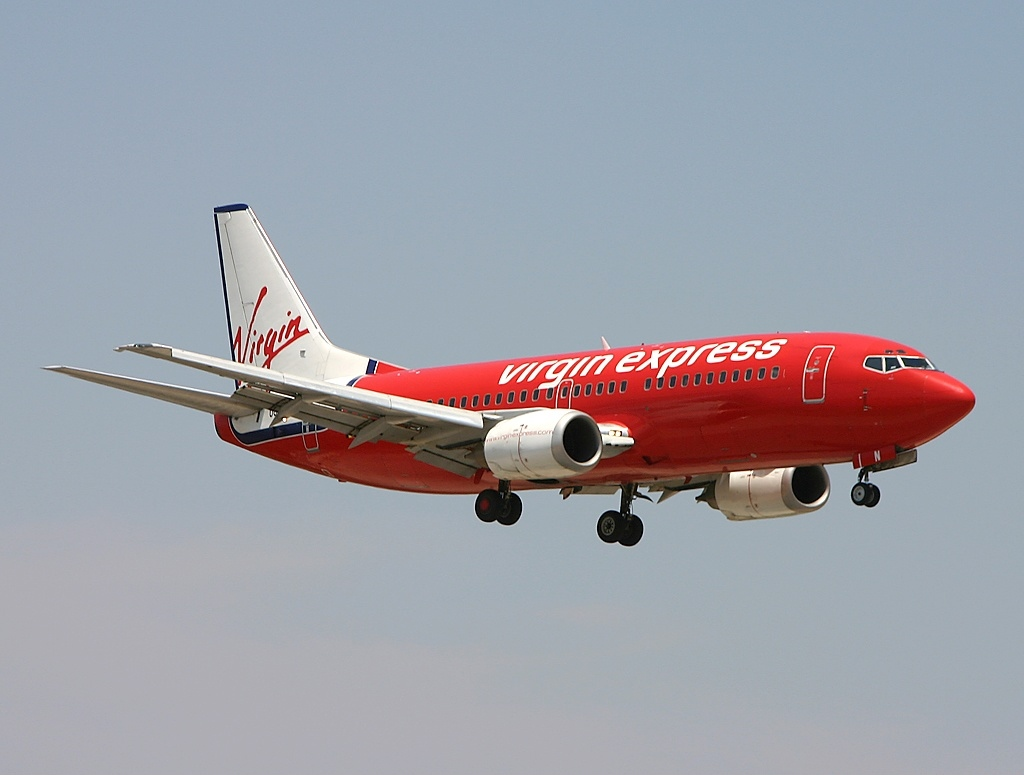
A Boeing 737-300 in 2005

Virgin Express was a Belgian airline created within the Virgin Group. It operated flights mainly to southern Europe from its hub at Brussels Airport. Ticket sales were mainly through the Internet. The airline merged to form Brussels Airlines in November 2006. Virgin Express' head office was in Building 116 at Brussels Airport in Zaventem, Belgium, near Brussels.

== History ==
On 23 April 1996, the Virgin Group (with chairman Richard Branson) bought the Belgian leisure airline EBA-EuroBelgian Airlines, founded by Victor Hasson and Georges Gutelman, and renamed it Virgin Express on September 2 of that same year. It also took over EBA's fleet of Boeing 737s and operated this type of aircraft from thereon. The airline soon concentrated on low-budget scheduled flights out of its Brussels hub, and became a major competitor for Sabena and later SN Brussels Airlines.

In October 2004, the Virgin Group sold the ownership to Delta Air Transport, and both airlines were placed under the control of SN Airholding holding company, chaired by Viscount Étienne Davignon. On 31 March 2006, SN Brussels Airlines and Virgin Express announced their merger into a single company, to be named Brussels Airlines. The combined airline added long haul destinations and strengthened its position in Africa.

== Fleet ==
During its 11-year existence, Virgin Express had operated the following aircraft:

Virgin Express retired fleet
Aircraft	Total	Introduced	Retired	Notes
Airbus A320-200	1	1997	1997	Leased from Constellation International Airlines
Boeing 737-200	2	1997	1997	Leased from AirFoyle Passenger Airlines
Boeing 737-300	15	1996	2007	
Boeing 737-400	11	1996	2007	
Lockheed L-1011 TriStar	1	1998	1998	Leased from Aer Turas
McDonnell Douglas DC-10-30	1	1998	1998	Used for charter flights for summer

== See also ==
- List of defunct airlines of Belgium
- SN Brussels Airlines
- Virgin Express France
