= MXN (disambiguation) =

MXN is the ISO 4217 currency code for Mexican peso, the currency of Mexico.

MXN or mxn may also refer to:

- Mariani Junction railway station (Indian Railways station code: MXN), a railway station in Assam, India
- Moi language (ISO 639-3: mxn), a West Papuan language of the Bird's Head Peninsula of New Guinea
- Morlaix – Ploujean Airport (IATA: MXN), an airport located in Ploujean, France
