= Bombardier CRJ family =

The Bombardier CRJ family includes:

- Bombardier CRJ100/200
- Bombardier CRJ700 series, extended to the CRJ900, and CRJ1000
