= List of Bombardier CRJ operators =

This article contains one version of a list of orders made by airlines and other buyers for the Bombardier CRJ family of regional aircraft.

Produced by Bombardier Aerospace of the Canadian aerospace and defence company Bombardier Inc., which was owned by Mitsubishi Aircraft Corporation, the former CRJ100 and CRJ200 series are no longer in modern production but remain in active service.

The more recent CRJ700, CRJ900 and CRJ1000 models were produced until 2020 whereupon Mitsubishi resolved to halt production wholesale.

== Orders and operators ==
=== CRJ100/CRJ200 ===
Deliveries and operators sortable, presorted by customer

- Ord — number of aircraft ordered from Bombardier
- Del — number of aircraft delivered by Bombardier
- Opr — number of aircraft in operation with specified airline
- Leasing Company.
- Defunct Carrier.

Customer	Ord	Del	Opr	Ord	Del	Opr	Ord	Del	Opr	Note
Customer	CRJ100			CRJ200			Total			Note
Aerolíneas Sosa			1						1	
Air Canada	24	24		17	17		41	41		
Air Dolomiti				5	5		5	5		
Air Littoral	19	19					19	19		
Air Nostrum				35	35		35	35		
Air Uganda						3			3	Operates an all-CRJ200 fleet
Air Wisconsin				64	64	62	64	64	62	
Austrian Airlines		-	-		12	-				From the into Austrian airlines merged airline Tyrolean Airways
Atlantic Southeast Airlines				45	45		45	45		Airline merged into ExpressJet
Boston Enterprises						1			1	
Brit Air	20	20					20	20		Airline merged into HOP!
British European				2	2		2	2		Airline rebranded as Flybe
Caterham Jet			1						1	
CemAir			6		2				6	
Charter Jets						1			1	
China Maritime Service						2			2	
China Yunnan Airlines				6	6		6	6		Airline merged into China Eastern Airlines
Cimber Air				2	2		2	2		
Club One Air			1						1	
Comair	110	110					110	110		
DAC Air				2	2		2	2		
DAC East Africa						1			1	
Delta Connection				94	94		94	94		Were operated by Endeavor Air, retired in 2023.
Fair Inc.				2	2		2	2		Rebranded as Ibex Airlines
Felix Airways						2			2	
Fly540			2						2	
Gama Aviation						1			1	
Gaughan Flying						1			1	
GECAS				5	5		5	5		
Georgian Airways						1			1	
Imatong Airlines			2						2	
Independence Air				87	87		87	87		
IrAero						1			1	Operated by RusLine
J-Air				9	9		9	9		
Jazz						0			0	Operated for Air Canada Express
Kendell Airlines				12	12		12	12		Airline merged into Rex Airlines
Kinetic Motion						1			1	
Lauda Air	8	8					8	8		Airline merged into Austrian Airlines
Lufthansa CityLine	35	35		10	10		45	45		Launch customer of CRJ-100
Maersk Air				11	11		11	11		Airline merged into Sterling Airlines
Malév Hungarian Airlines				4	4		4	4		Aircraft operated under Malév Express subsidiary
Med Airways						1			1	
Mesa Airlines				32	32		32	32		
MGC Airlines						1			1	
Midway Airlines				24	24		24	24		
MNG Jet						1			1	
MWR Aviation						1			1	
Northwest Airlines				142	142		142	142		Airline merged into Delta Air Lines
Nova Airways						2			2	
People's Liberation Army Air Force						5			5	
Rayan Aviation						1			1	
RusLine			8			5			13	
Saurya Airlines				2	2	2	2	2	2	
Saeaga Airlines				1	1		1	1		
SCAT Airlines						7			7	
Severstal Aircompany						4			4	
Shandong Airlines				5	5		5	5		
Shanghai Airlines				3	3		3	3		
Shree Airlines				2	2	2				
Skyward International Aviation						1			1	
SkyWest Airlines	10	10		100	100	69	110	110	69	Launch customer of CRJ-200
South African Express				6	6		6	6		
South Supreme Airlines			1						1	
Southern Winds Airlines				2	2		2	2		
Stewart–Haas Racing						2			2	Former US Airways Express aircraft
Styrian Spirit				1	1		1	1		
Sun Way						1			1	Operated by ExecuJet Air Charter
TransferVIP			1						1	Operated by Flight Test Consultants
Tyrolean Airways				13	13		13	13		
US Airways				35	35		35	35		Operated by PSA Airlines, US Airways merged into American Airlines
Voyageur Airways						7			7	
Wu Air						2			2	
Yamal Airlines						3			3	
Zambezi Airlines						1			1	
Zoom Air						5			5	
	CRJ100			CRJ200			Total			Aircraft no longer in production
	Ord	Del	Opr	Ord	Del	Opr	Ord	Del	Opr	Aircraft no longer in production
Totals	226	226	25	782	782	302	1008	1008	327	Aircraft no longer in production
Backlog	0			0			0			Aircraft no longer in production

=== CRJ700/CRJ900/CRJ1000 ===
Deliveries and operators sortable, presorted by customer

- Ord — number of aircraft ordered from Bombardier
- Del — number of aircraft delivered by Bombardier
- Opr — number of aircraft in operation with specified airline
- Leasing Company.
- Defunct Carrier.

Customer	Ord	Del	Opr	Ord	Del	Opr	Ord	Del	Opr	Ord	Del	Opr	Note
Customer	CRJ700			CRJ900			CRJ1000			Total			Note
Adria Airways				5	4					5			
Air Canada				15	15					15	15		Operated by Jazz Launch customer of CRJ-700
Air Nostrum				11	11		35	10	33	46	21	27	Launch customer and only current operator of CRJ-1000.
Air One CityLiner				10	10					10	10		Rebranded as Alitalia CityLiner
American Eagle	47	47								47	47		Operated by PSA Airlines
Arik Air				4	4	3	3	0		7	5	3	
Atlantic Southeast Airlines	12	12								12	12		Airline merged into ExpressJet
Air Century	10						10	3	0	20	6	0	First operator of the Caribbean
Brit Air	15	15					14	13		29	28		Airline merged into HOP! Launch customer of CRJ-700
CemAir			1			5						6	
China Express Airlines				40	40	38				40	40	38	
CityJet						17			6			23	Operated for Scandinavian Airlines and Lufthansa
Comair	20	20								20	20		
Delta Connection	30	30		44	44					74	74		Operated by Endeavor Air, ExpressJet
Delta Air Lines				60	60					40	3		Operated by Endeavor Air
Endeavor Air			13			123						136	
Estonian Air				3	3					3	3		Stopped operating 2015
Eurowings				15	15					15	15		All transferred to Lufthansa CityLine in 2017
Felix Airways	8	2	2							8	2	2	
GECAS	17	17					17	17		17	17	17	
GoJet Airlines	14	14	67							14	14	67	
Horizon Air	20	20								20	20		
Ibex Airlines			10									10	
Ibom Air				0	0	5	0	0	0	0	0	5	CRJ900
Iraqi Airways				10	6	6				10	6	6	
Jazz						35						35	CRJ705 (CRJ900 with 76 seats)
Libyan Airlines				8	8	4				8	8	4	
Lufthansa				8	8					8	8		Operated by Eurowings
Lufthansa CityLine	20	20		12	12	28				32	32	28	
Maersk Air	5	5								5	5		Airline merged into Sterling Airlines
MAT Macedonian Airlines				1	1					1	1		
Mesa Airlines	20	20		38	38					58	58		Launch customer of CRJ-900. Retired in 2023.
MyAir				4	4					4	4		
Nordic Aviation Capital							12	9		12	9		Leased to Garuda Indonesia
Northwest Airlines				36	36					36	36		Airline merged into Delta Air Lines
Oasis Leasing				1	1					1	1		Leased to Air Canada, operated by Jazz
Petroleum Air Services				1	1	1				1	1	1	
PLUNA				13	13					13	13		
PSA Airlines			38			69						107	
RwandAir				2	2	2				2	2	2	
Scandinavian Airlines				12	12	20				12	12	20	Operated by City Jet and XFly
Shandong Airlines	2	2								2	2		
Shree Airlines	2	2	2							2	2	2	
SkyWest Airlines	79	79	104	21	21	41				100	100	145	
Styrian Spirit	1	1								1	1		
Tatarstan Airlines				6	2					6	2		
Tuninter				1	1					1	1		Rebranded as TunisAir Express
TunisAir Express						1						1	
Uganda Airlines				4	4	4							
United Airlines	50	0								50	0		CRJ550 (CRJ700 with 50 seats)
Undisclosed customers	13	5	5										
	CRJ700			CRJ900			CRJ1000			Total			Aircraft no longer in production
	Ord	Del	Opr	Ord	Del	Opr	Ord	Del	Opr	Ord	Del	Opr	Aircraft no longer in production
Totals	333	317	242	385	376	392	64	34	33	782	727	661	Aircraft no longer in production
Backlog	0			0			0			0			Aircraft no longer in production

== See also ==
- Bombardier CRJ family of regional jets
  - Bombardier CRJ200 series (CRJ100, CRJ200)
  - Bombardier CRJ700 series (CRJ700, CRJ900, CRJ1000)
