= Brit Air Flight 5672 =

2003 aircraft accident in France

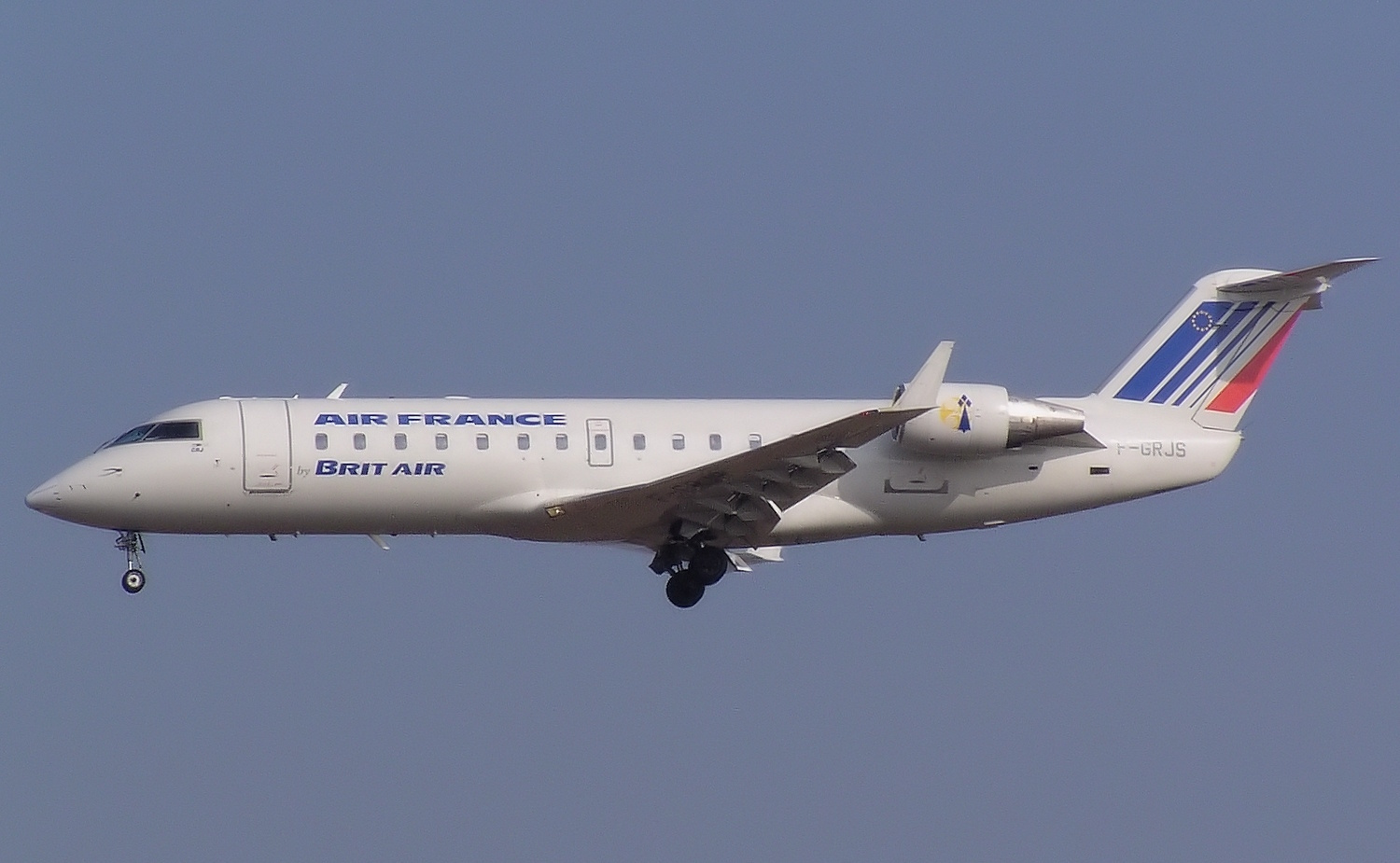
- F-GRJS, the aircraft involved in the accident, photographed in March 2003

Accident
- Date: 22 June 2003
- Summary: Controlled flight into terrain
- Site: Commune of Saint-Divy, near Brest-Guipavas Airport, Brest, France; 48°27′18″N 4°22′06″W

Aircraft
- Aircraft type: Bombardier CRJ100ER
- Operator: Brit Air for Air France
- IATA flight No.: AF5672
- Call sign: BRIT AIR 672 ECHO CHARLIE
- Registration: F-GRJS
- Flight origin: Nantes Atlantique Airport, Nantes, France
- Destination: Brest-Guipavas Airport, Brest, France
- Occupants: 24
- Passengers: 21
- Crew: 3
- Fatalities: 1
- Injuries: 9
- Survivors: 23

Brit Air Flight 5672 was a domestic passenger flight from Nantes Atlantique Airport to Brest-Guipavas Airport, France, which crashed on 22 June 2003. The flight was a Bombardier CRJ100ER operated by Brit Air, a regional airline which was a subsidiary of Air France. The aircraft crashed during its landing phase, striking multiple obstacles and then crashing onto a road and bursting into flames. The occupants were evacuated immediately. The captain was killed in the crash, while 23 survived.

An investigation led by France's air accident investigation body, the Bureau of Enquiry and Analysis for Civil Aviation Safety (BEA), revealed that the crew of Flight 5672 neglected to select the approach mode on the autopilot. As a result, the glideslope was not captured. The aircraft subsequently deviated significantly from its expected flight path, and the issue worsened as the crew failed to monitor the aircraft's altitude. The Ground Proximity Warning System sounded the alarm,

== Flight ==
The aircraft was operating a regular domestic passenger flight from Nantes to Brest under an Instrument flight rules (IFR) flight plan. It was carrying 21 passengers, two cockpit crew (a Captain and a First Officer) and one cabin crew member. The flight took off at 21:16 local time, 50 minutes later than scheduled.,

During the cruise segment of the flight, storms were brewing in the area. Cumulonimbus clouds were reportedly present with a cloud base at 200 ft. The crew had to deviate slightly from the planned route to avoid a storm system near Brest, Guipavas. The weather information in Brest indicated that the visibility was 800 meters and that fog was present.

At 21:39, air traffic control cleared the crew to descend the aircraft to an altitude of 7,000 feet (2,100 m) then later to enter a holding pattern. At 21:47, approximately 90 seconds before the start of the planned holding pattern, the controller cleared the crew to descend to 2,000 feet (610 m) and to continue the approach. Shortly after, the aircraft aligned with the ILS localizer, which is an instrument landing system that is used to guide the aircraft along the axis of the runway, and the crew prepared for landing. The controller stated that he would clear the aircraft to land after the crew reported their position.

=== Accident ===
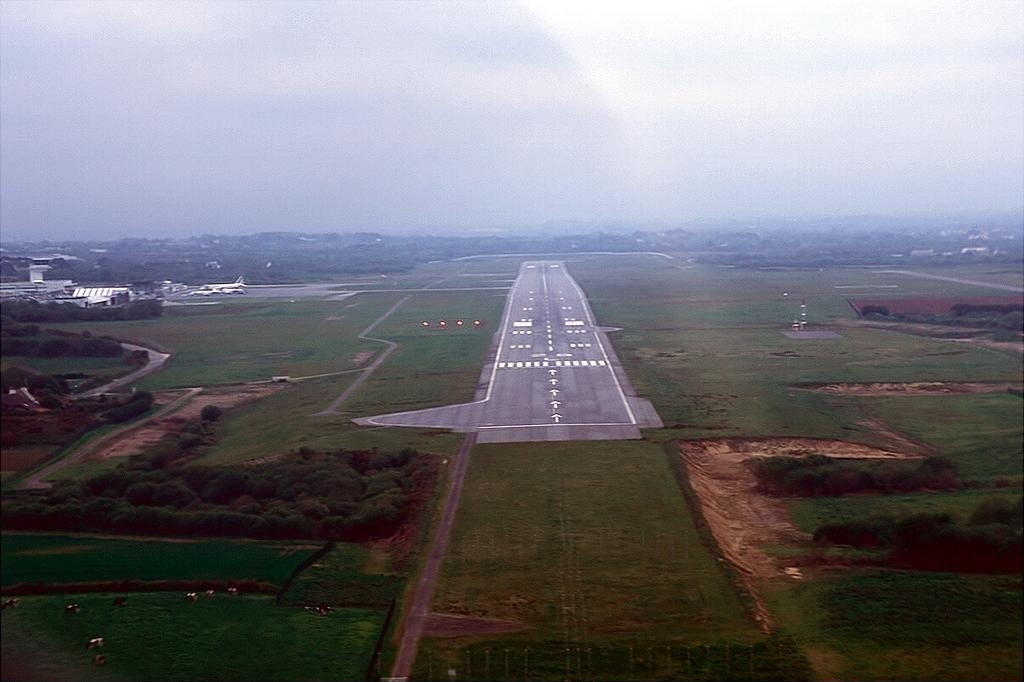
Brest Airport Runway 26L, the runway intended by Flight 5672 to land

At 21:48, the First Officer extended the flaps and the aircraft was stabilized at 2,000 ft. While the aircraft was stabilized, wind blowing from the northwest began to shift it from its route, pushing the aircraft to the left, something the crew failed to notice. At 21:49, the crew lowered the flaps to their final landing position and performed the pre-landing checklist.

At 21:51, while at an altitude of about 500 feet (150 m) during the approach to land, the aircraft's Ground Proximity Warning System (GPWS) sounded the "sink rate" alarm. The Captain then disengaged the autopilot and the aircraft continued its descent. At 100 ft the GPWS then warned the crew to "pull up". The captain called for a go-around and the crew added thrust to the engines.

At 21:51:22, Flight 5672 touched down on a grass field near the airport at a low speed. The Bombardier CRJ-100 then skidded and slammed into a wooded embankment. It then struck trees, causing the tip of the left wing to detach. Fire immediately broke out on the left wing. It then hit a concrete wall, causing the right wing and one of the aircraft doors to detach. The aircraft finally stopped after it hit a pole.

=== Evacuation ===
After the aircraft stopped, a fire began to spread. Intense fire developed inside the aircraft mostly to the left-hand side. Passengers witnessed the fire spread into the cabin through the sidewalls. The flight attendant opened the cockpit door and saw huge hull breaches in the cockpit. She ordered the passengers to evacuate through the missing right service door.

During the evacuation, several passengers still could not find the way out. Two passengers ran to the aft end of the cabin. They were later told by another passenger that there was no emergency exit at the back. A regular flyer of Flight 5672, who was seated at the center of the aircraft, opened the left emergency door. He realized that there was an intense fire on the left wing and decided to leave by the door. The flames then entered the aircraft through the opened emergency exit. The copilot evacuated from the cockpit through the hole that had been formed by the impact. The flight attendant exited the aircraft and assisted in the evacuation from the outside. The aircraft was evacuated in less than one minute. The evacuation went well as the cabin lighting and the fire enabled the passengers to find the exits in a timely manner.

=== Rescue operation ===
The control tower personnel reported to Brest Airport's fire brigade that they had lost all contact with Flight 5672 and fire crews began to search for the crash site. At 21:56, the fire brigade contacted Brest's city fire brigade. They later received phone calls from the passengers and crew of Flight 5672 that the aircraft had crashed near the airport. The fire services arrived at the crash site at 22:18. The copilot and a passenger were taken to a nearby hospital while the others were taken to the airport terminal. After being examined by doctors, some of them were later taken to a hospital for further treatment.

The captain was the only fatality. Nine others were injured.

== Investigation ==
Hours after the crash, the flight recorders were found in good condition. They were later sent to Paris for analysis. The FDR and CVR analyses were explained as follows:

At 21:44, the crew of Flight 5672 were told by Brest Tower to perform the holding pattern in response to the deteriorating weather in Brest. Flight 5672 was later cleared for the approach. The captain then began to arm the approach mode by selecting the heading mode. He later changed the navigation source to VOR and then activated the ILS frequency. These actions should only be done while arming the autopilot approach mode. However, after the captain activated the ILS frequency, the approach mode had not been armed. The crew should have armed the approach mode by pressing the approach button. Had it been armed at that moment, Flight 5672 would have captured the localizer beam. The wind then began to cause Flight 5672 to drift left. At 21:48, Flight 5672 exited the localizer beam. While the crew was attempting to regain the altitude, the aircraft deviated further from its planned track. The localizer deviation number rose to +1.75. After the aircraft "captured" the glide slope from above, the Captain armed the approach mode. However, it was too late, and no capture occurred. Believing that the glide slope had been captured, the crew shifted their attention to the horizontal navigation.

As Flight 5672 descended, multiple alarms and warnings began to sound. The captain then announced "go-around" and added more thrust to the engines. However, due to the low airspeed at the time, the aircraft failed to ascend. Flight 5672 later hit the ground and burst into flames.

=== Conclusion and recommendations ===
The BEA released its final report and concluded that the crash was caused by pilot error, specifically:

- failure to select the APPR mode at the start of the approach
- failure to detect flight path deviations
- continuing a non-stabilised approach down to the decision altitude.

A contributing factor was the change of strategy by the controller managing the flight. The BEA issued 13 recommendations to the General Directorate of Civil Aviation and Brit Air.
