= Ploujean =

Coordinates: 48°36′19″N 3°50′2″W

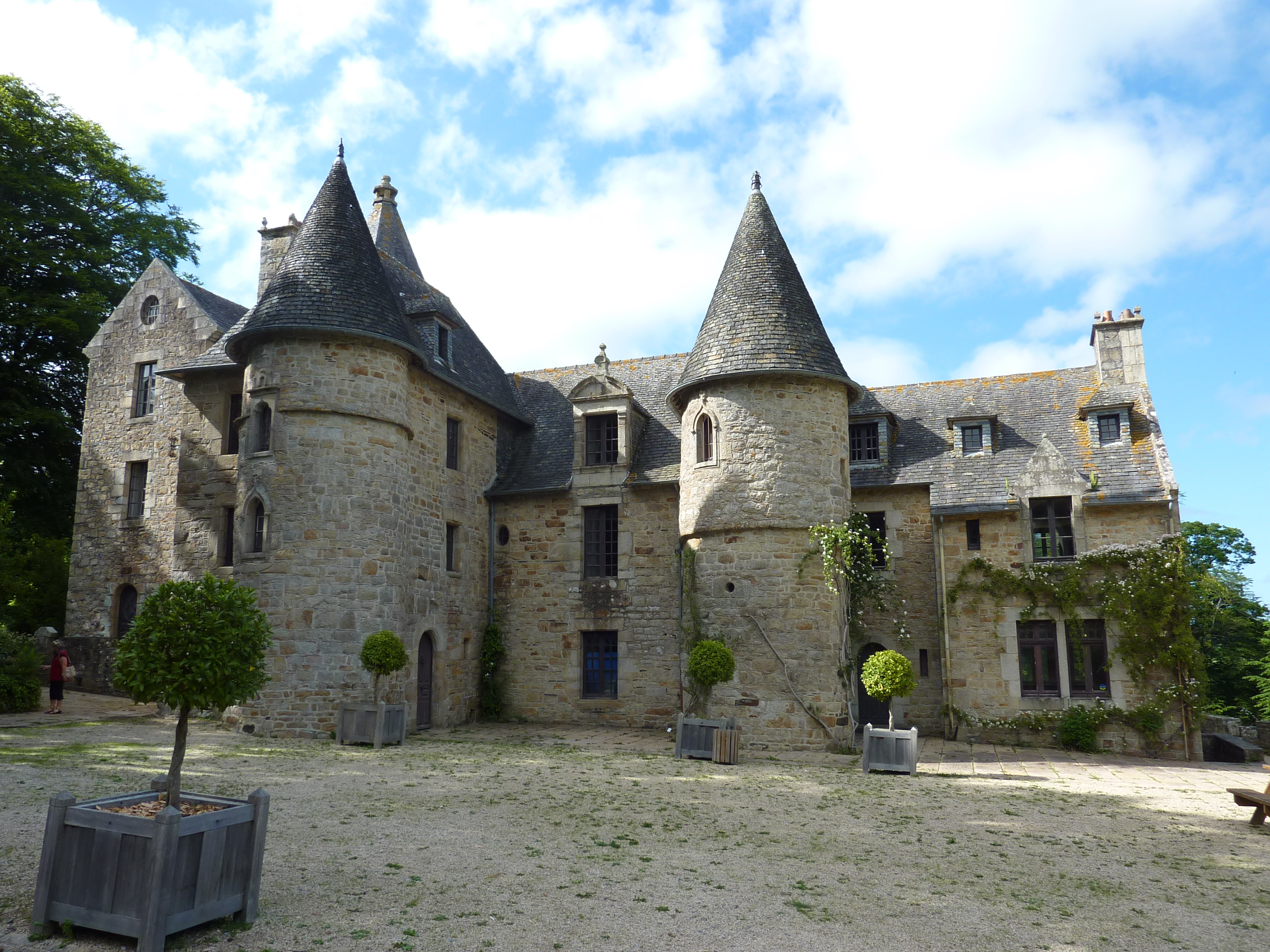
Manoir de Suscinio, Ploujean

Ploujean is a former commune of Finistère which is part of Morlaix since February 1959.

The church was built in the 15th century. It has been listed as a Monument historique since 1914 by the French Ministry of Culture, and its organ, built by Thomas Dallam II in the 17th century, has been listed since 1992.

It is the birthplace of the Breton poets Tristan Corbière and Olivier Souvestre (1835–1871). It is also the place where Gabriel Pierné died in 1937.

The population was 3,142 at the 1954 census.

Morlaix's airport, in Ploujean, is Morlaix – Ploujean Airport. Brit Air, a regional airline and Air France subsidiary, was headquartered by the airport in Ploujean. In 2013 the airline merged into HOP!.
