= Morlaix–Ploujean Airport =

Morlaix–Ploujean Airport Aéroport de Morlaix–Ploujean Advanced Landing Ground (ALG) A-51
- IATA: MXN; ICAO: LFRU

Summary
- Airport type: Public
- Operator: CCI Morlaix
- Serves: Morlaix, France
- Location: Ploujean, France
- Elevation AMSL: 277 ft (84 m)
- Coordinates: 48°36′03″N 003°49′00″W

Map
- Location of Morlaix – Ploujean Airport

Runways
| Direction | Length | | Surface |
| Direction | m | ft | Surface |
|---|---|---|---|
| 04/22 | 1,617 | 5,305 | Paved |
| 16/34 | 900 | 2,952 | Unpaved |
| 09/27 | 610 | 2,001 | Unpaved |
- Source: French AIP

Morlaix–Ploujean Airport (French: Aéroport de Morlaix–Ploujean; Breton: Aerborzh Morleiz-Plouja) (IATA: MXN, ICAO: LFRU) is an airport located 2 kilometres (1.2 mi) northeast of Morlaix, a commune of the Finistère department in the Brittany (French, Bretagne) region of France. The airport is located in the former commune of Ploujean.

Brit Air, a regional airline, had its head office on the grounds of the airport. In 2013, the airline merged into HOP!
