= Bombardier CRJ700 series =

Regional jet airliner series

CRJ700 series

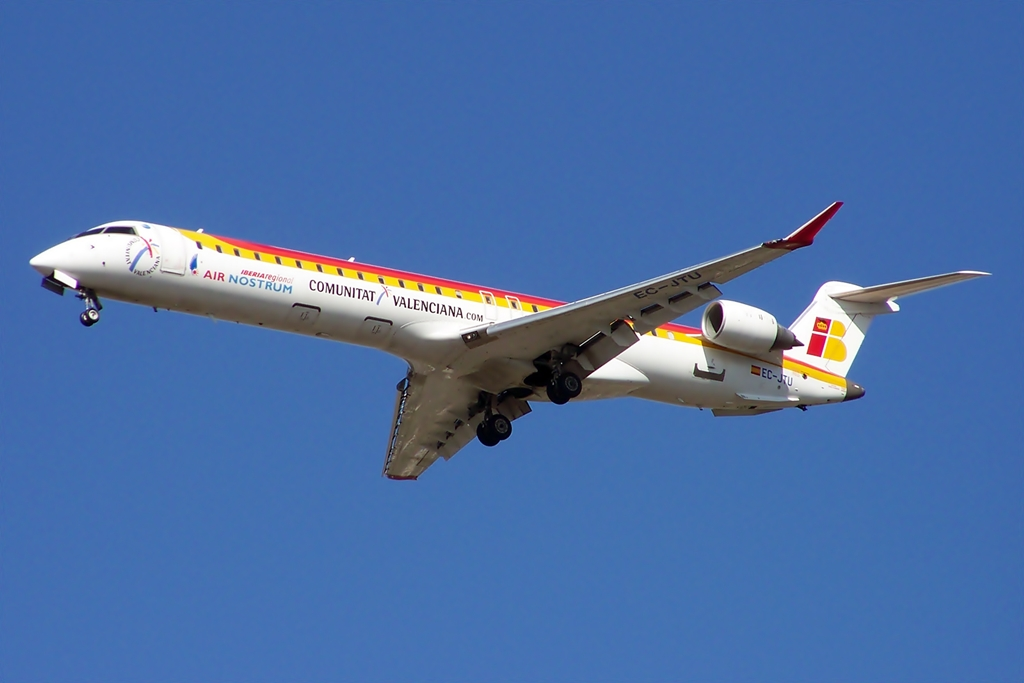
- An Air Nostrum CRJ900

General information
- Type: Regional jet
- National origin: Canada
- Manufacturer: Bombardier Aviation
- Status: In service
- Primary users: SkyWest Airlines PSA Airlines; Endeavor Air; GoJet Airlines
- Number built: 924 (Note: 1945 CRJs (all variants) minus 1021 CRJ100/200/440)

History
- Manufactured: 1999–2020
- Introduction date: 2001 with Brit Air
- First flight: 27 May 1999
- Developed from: Bombardier CRJ100/200

The Bombardier CRJ700 series is a family of regional jet airliners that were designed and manufactured by Canadian transportation conglomerate Bombardier. Officially launched in 1997, the CRJ700 made its maiden flight on 27 May 1999 and was soon followed by the stretched CRJ900 variant. Several additional models were introduced, including the further elongated CRJ1000 and the CRJ550 and CRJ705, which were modified to comply with scope clauses. In 2020, the Mitsubishi Aircraft Corporation acquired the CRJ program and subsequently ended production of the aircraft.

Development of the CRJ700 series was launched in 1994 under the CRJ-X program, aimed at creating larger variants of the successful CRJ100 and 200, the other members of the Bombardier CRJ series. Competing aircraft included the British Aerospace 146, the Embraer E-Jet family, the Fokker 70, and the Fokker 100.

In Bombardier’s product lineup, the CRJ-Series was marketed alongside the larger C-Series (now owned by Airbus and rebranded as the Airbus A220) and the Q-Series turboprop (now owned by De Havilland Canada and marketed as the Dash 8). In the late 2010s, Bombardier began divesting its commercial aircraft programs, and on 1 June 2020, Mitsubishi finalized the acquisition of the CRJ program. Bombardier continued manufacturing CRJ aircraft on behalf of Mitsubishi until fulfilling all existing orders in December 2020. While Mitsubishi continues to produce parts for existing CRJ operators, it currently has no plans to build new CRJ aircraft, having originally intended to focus on its SpaceJet aircraft, which has since been discontinued.

== Development ==
=== Origins ===
During the early 1990s, Bombardier Aerospace became interested in developing larger variants of the CRJ 100 and 200 and associated design work commenced in 1994. The CRJ-X, as the new range was initially designated, sought to compete with larger regional jets such as the Fokker 70, Fokker 100 or the British Aerospace 146. The CRJ-X featured a stretched fuselage, a lengthened wing, and up-rated General Electric CF34-8C engines, while maintaining a common type-rating with the CRJ 100 and 200. Leading-edge extensions and high-lift slats improved the wing performance, other aerodynamic changes included an enlarged horizontal tailfin. By March 1995, low-speed wind tunnel testing confirmed a range of 1,530 nautical miles (2,830 km; 1,760 mi) in a 74-seat configuration intended for the North American market and 1,270 nautical miles (2,350 km; 1,460 mi) in a 72-seat configuration intended for the European market. First deliveries were planned for 1999.

In 1995, the development was projected to cost around C$300 million (US$200 million). In June 1996, Bombardier selected Rockwell Collins' Pro Line 4 avionics suite. During May 1996, General Electric formally launched the previously selected CF34-8C variant. Extensive redesigning resulted in the CRJ700 retaining only 15% of the CRJ200 airframe.

=== Launch ===
The CRJ-X launch was delayed by several months, due to negotiations with suppliers and subcontractors. During September 1996, Bombardier's board authorised sales of the CRJ-X. During January 1997, the CRJ-X was officially launched. In March 1997, four prototypes were planned for the CRJ700's flight-test program. On 27 May 1999, the first prototype CRJ700 made its maiden flight. At this point, type certification was expected for 2001. By 1999, Bombardier had invested C$650 million (US$440 million) to develop the 70-seat CRJ700, which was listed at $24–25 million.

A new final-assembly facility was established at Montréal-Mirabel International Airport, as the CRJ100/200's existing line had insufficient capacity. In January 2001, Transport Canada granted the CRJ700 its type approval. In May 2001, the U.S. Federal Aviation Administration certification for the CRJ700 was close, but required two minor avionics-related changes.

In September 1998, Bombardier considered developing an all-new 90-seat model, the BRJ-X, but ultimately opted for a stretched version of the CRJ-X, which became the CRJ900. It would share a type rating with the CRJ700, allowing pilots to transition between them with a three-day cross-crew qualification course. Development of the CRJ900 was underway by 1999, with Bombardier investing C$200 million for the CRJ900. The aircraft was initially priced at $28–29 million. The CRJ900's official launch was delayed in May 2000 due to contract negotiations, but it was formally introduced in July 2000. The aircraft was designed for existing CRJ200 and CRJ700 operators seeking a larger capacity jet. One of the CRJ700 prototypes was modified to represent the CRJ900 configuration, later joined by a second purpose-built test aircraft. The CRJ900 made its maiden flight on February 21, 2001, five months ahead of schedule, and the first aircraft was delivered in April 2003.

The CRJ1000, originally launched as the CRJ-900X in February 2007, was developed as a further stretch of the CRJ900 to accommodate up to 100 passengers. The CRJ1000 shares a high level of commonality with the CRJ700 and CRJ900, but featured an improved version of the General Electric CF34 engine, with enhanced high-pressure turbine performance achieved through optimized blade airfoil geometry, software upgrades, and improved cooling. The turbine nozzles were also redesigned to reduce the number of vanes from 48 to 34. The CRJ1000 also introduced a new cabin design with larger overhead luggage bins, larger windows, improved lighting, and redesigned ceiling panels and sidewalls. A prototype aircraft completed its first flight in 2008, followed by the production flight on 28 July 2009 in Montreal. One month into the flight-test program, a fault in the rudder controls was discovered, grounding the jet until February 2010, and deliveries were projected to begin by January 2011.

=== Further improvements ===
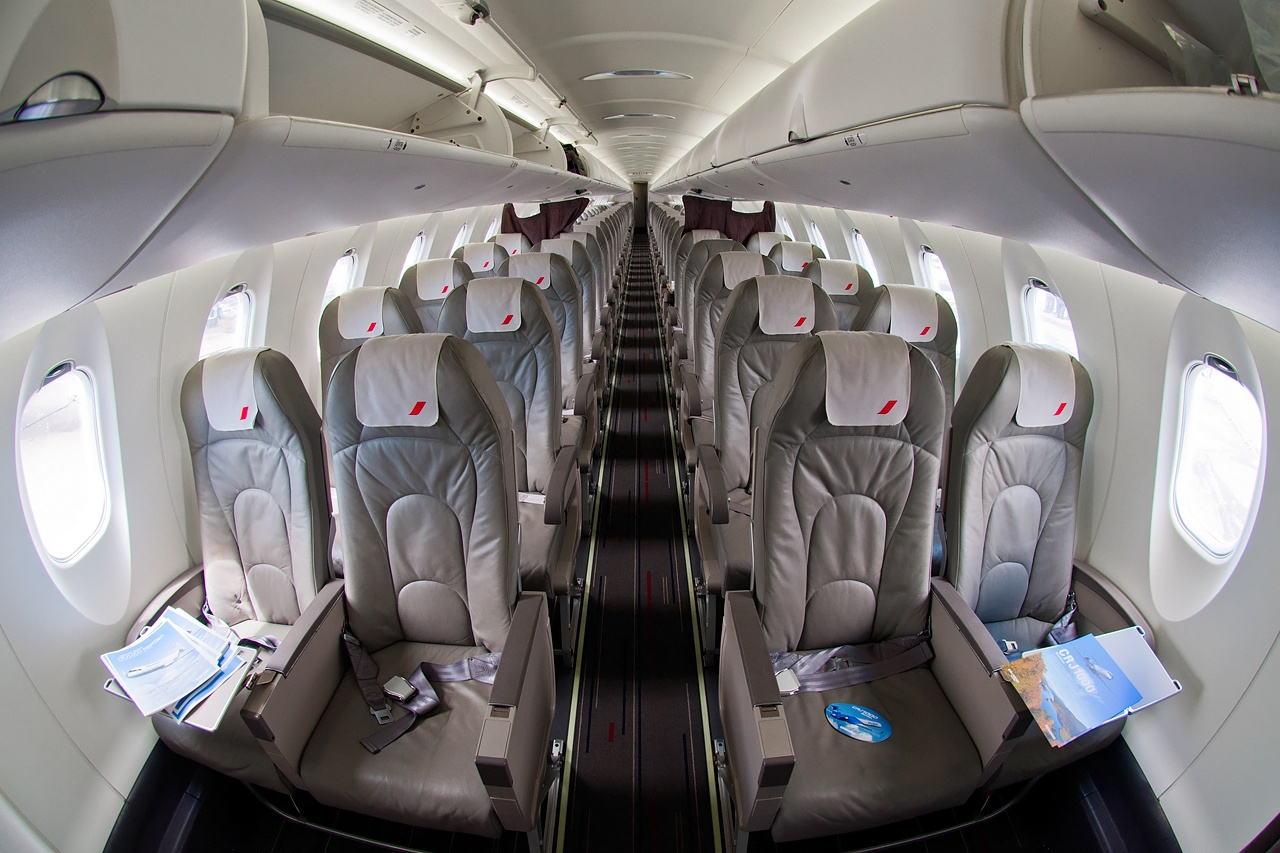
Four-abreast cabin seating of a CRJ1000 NextGen

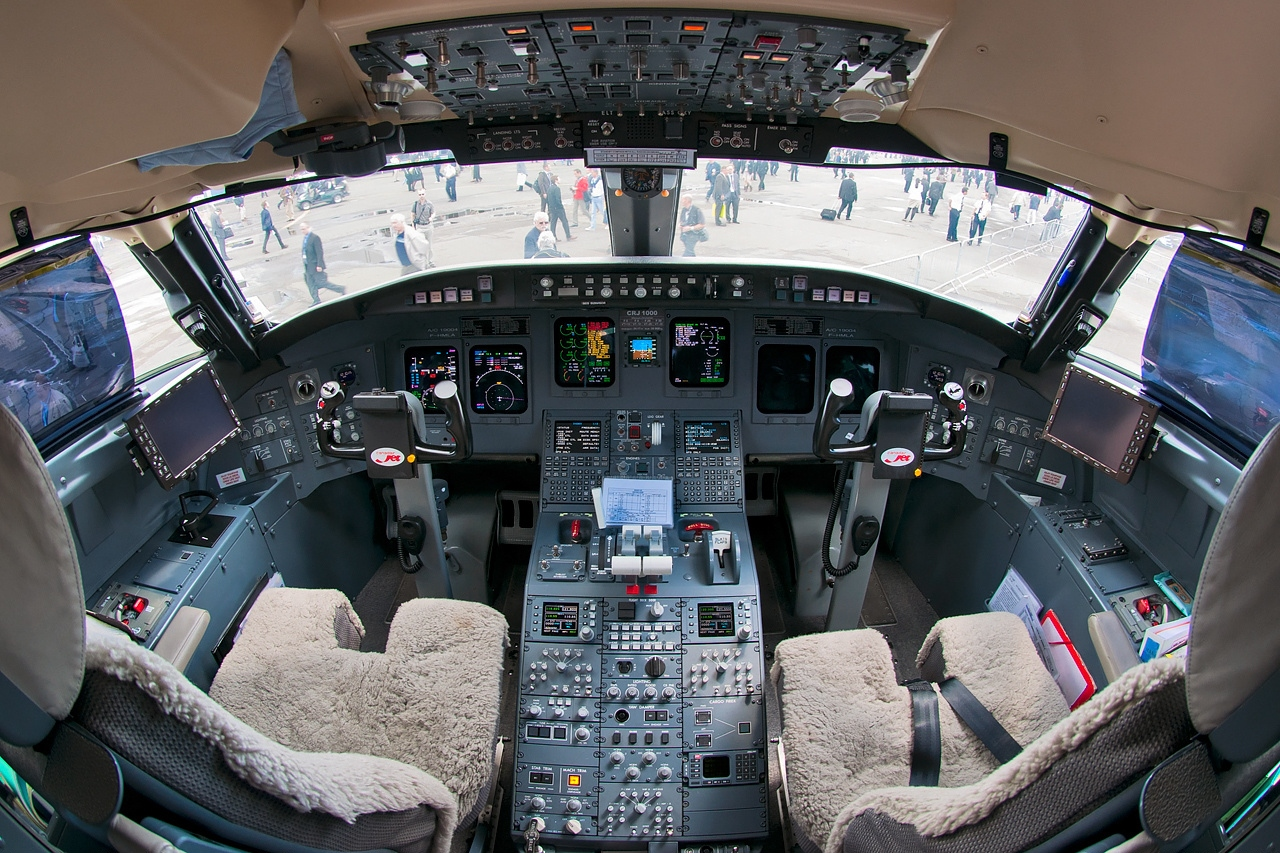
The flight deck of a CRJ1000 NextGen

During 2007, Bombardier launched the CRJ900 NextGen, featuring improvements developed for the CRJ1000. The improvements include improvements to the GE CF34 engine which enhanced fuel economy by 5.5%, a redesigned cabin with larger overhead bins, and reduced costs by extending maintenance intervals. Mesaba Aviation (now Endeavor Air) operating at the time as Northwest Airlink (now Delta Connection), was the launch customer for the CRJ900 NextGen, and remains the largest operator of the CRJ900. A similar NextGen package was rolled out to the CRJ700 in 2008, with SkyWest Airlines as the launch customer.

During 2016, Bombardier further modernized the CRJ Series with the "Atmosphere" cabin, which included a more spacious entryway, larger overhead bins, larger windows situated higher upon the fuselage, a larger forward lavatory on the CRJ900 and CRJ1000, and LED accent lighting. Maintenance intervals were also further extended, with "A" checks occurring every 800 flight hours and "C" checks every 8,000 flight hours. A new engine nozzle provided an additional 1% fuel efficiency improvement.

=== Re-engine study ===
Throughout its production, the CRJ family competed with the Embraer E-Jet family series. However, Bombardier ultimately ruled out a re-engining the CRJ to compete with the Embraer E-Jet E2. Bombardier and General Electric studied a NG34 next generation engine using technologies from the GEnx, and even went as far as building a prototype core for testing. However, Bombardier felt that the certification costs and the added weight of newer, more efficient engines would negate potential fuel burn improvements on short-haul regional routes.

== Sales history ==
During April 2000, a substantial early order, valued at US$10 billion, for the CRJ700 (and CRJ200) was issued by Delta Air Lines, involving 500 aircraft along with options for 406 more. Comair, operating as Delta Connection, placed an order of 14 CRJ900s; by November 2007, six of these had entered revenue service.

During September 2011, PLUNA received its 11th airplane (from an eventual total order of 15 with options). Estonian Air ordered three CRJ900 NextGen 88-seat aircraft. Also, SAS ordered 13 of these in March 2008. Iraqi Airways has ordered six Bombardier CRJ900 NextGen airliners and options on a further four of the type. In June 2010, Lufthansa ordered eight of the CRJ900 NextGen. In December 2012, Delta Air Lines ordered 40 CRJ900 NextGen worth $1.89 billion with 30 options.

During February 2012, Garuda Indonesia ordered six CRJ1000s and took options for another 18. Danish lessor Nordic Aviation Capital also ordered 12 for Garuda to operate, with delivery beginning in 2012.

According to Bombardier, by 2015, the CRJ series accounted for over 20% of all jet departures in North America; globally, the family operated in excess of 200,000 flights per month. Bombardier expected the 60–100-seat airliner market to represent 5,500 aircraft from 2018 through 2037.

=== Divestment ===
As of November 2018, following Bombardier's decisions to sell the CSeries to Airbus and the QSeries to Viking Air, the company was looking at "strategic options" to return the CRJ to profitability. Analysts suspected that it would decide to exit the commercial aircraft market altogether and refocus on business aircraft.

On 25 June 2019, Bombardier announced a deal to sell the CRJ program to Mitsubishi Heavy Industries, the parent company of Mitsubishi Aircraft Corporation, which was developing the SpaceJet. Mitsubishi had a historic interest in the CRJ program, having sounded out risk-sharing options with Bombardier, and at one point expected to take a stake in the venture during the 1990s. Bombardier stopped taking new sales; production of the CRJ continued at Mirabel until the order backlog was complete, with final deliveries in the second half of 2020. The deal included the type certificate for the CRJ series; Bombardier worked with Transport Canada to separate the CRJ certificate from that of the Challenger.

On 1 June 2020, closure of the deal was confirmed, with Bombardier's service and support activities transferred to a new Montreal-based company, MHI RJ Aviation Group. MHI RJ did not rename the aircraft, continuing to refer simply to the "CRJ Series".

=== End of production ===
The final CRJ to be produced, a CRJ900, was delivered to SkyWest Airlines on 28 February 2021.

== Variants ==
Series	Official model	Marketing	Max. seating	Remarks
CRJ700	CL-600-2C11	CRJ550	50	
CRJ700	CL-600-2C10	CRJ700	68	
CRJ700	CL-600-2C10	CRJ700ER	68	Extended Range
CRJ700	CL-600-2C10	CRJ701	70	
CRJ700	CL-600-2C10	CRJ701ER	70	Extended Range
CRJ700	CL-600-2C10	CRJ702	78	
CRJ700	CL-600-2C10	CRJ702ER	78	Extended Range
CRJ900	CL-600-2D15	CRJ705	75	All modified to CRJ900
CRJ900	CL-600-2D24	CRJ900	90	
CRJ900	CL-600-2D24	CRJ900ER	90	Extended Range
CRJ900	CL-600-2D24	CRJ900LR	90	Long Range
CRJ1000	CL-600-2E25	CRJ1000	104	
CRJ1000	CL-600-2E25	CRJ1000ER	104	Extended Range
CRJ1000	CL-600-2E25	CRJ1000EL	104	EuroLite

=== CRJ700 series ===
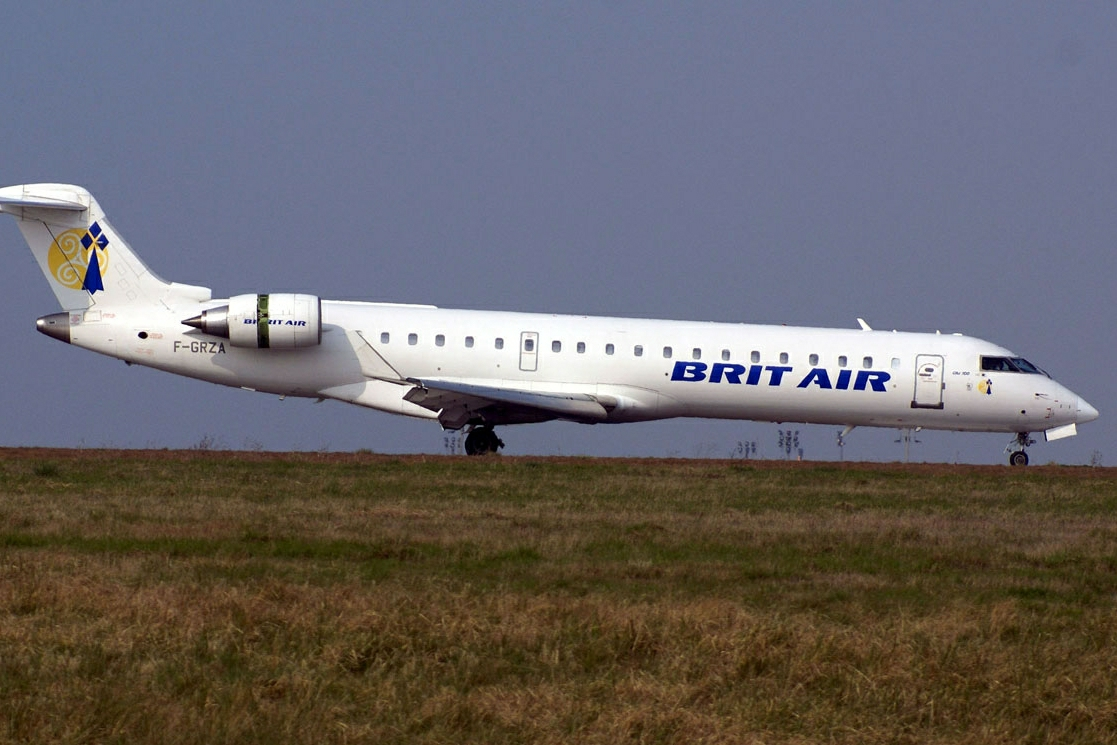
The CRJ700 was introduced by Brit Air in 2001.

Design work on the CRJ700 by Bombardier started in 1995, and the program was officially launched in January 1997. The CRJ700 is a stretched derivative of the CRJ200. The CRJ700 features a new wing with leading-edge slats and a stretched and slightly widened fuselage, with a lowered floor. Its first flight took place on 27 May 1999. The aircraft model is listed as CL-600-2C10 on the TCCA, FAA, and EASA Type Certificates. The CRJ700 first entered commercial service with Brit Air in 2001.

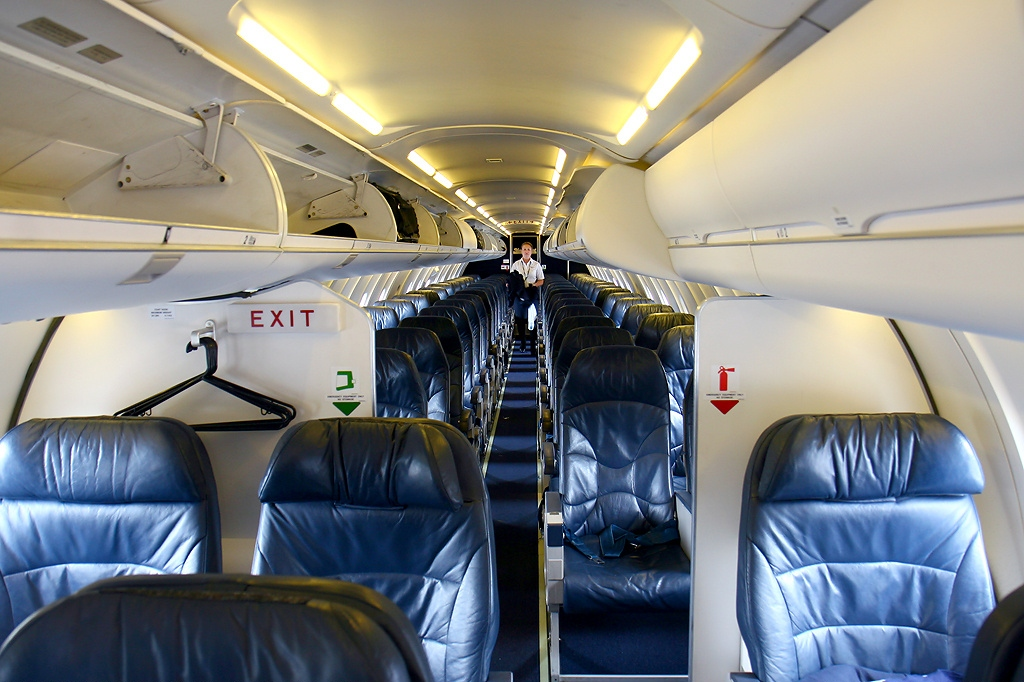
Two-class seating

The CRJ700 was built in three variants: Series 700 is limited to 68 passengers, the Series 701 to 70 passengers, and the Series 702 to 78 passengers. Each variant was offered with an ER ("Extended Range") option with increased in maximum weights, which in turn increases the range. The executive version is marketed as the Challenger 870. The CRJ700 directly competes with the Embraer 170, which typically seats 70 passengers.

Early-build aircraft were equipped with two General Electric CF34-8C1 engines, while later builds were equipped standard with the uprated -8C5.

Maximum speed is Mach 0.85 (561 mph; 903 km/h; 488 kn) at a maximum altitude of 41,000 ft (12,000 m). Depending upon payload and configuration, the CRJ700 has a range up to 2,032 nautical miles (3,763 km; 2,338 mi).

The CRJ700 family has seven different sub-variants:

==== CRJ700 ====
The baseline variant of the CRJ700 with a maximum passenger seating capacity of 68, a maximum takeoff weight (MTOW) of 72,750 pounds (33,000 kg) and a range of 1,702 nautical miles (3,152 km; 1,959 mi).

==== CRJ700ER ====
The "extended range" variant of the CRJ700 with a maximum passenger seating capacity of 68, a maximum takeoff weight (MTOW) of 75,000 pounds (34,000 kg) and a range of 2,032 nautical miles (3,763 km; 2,338 mi).

==== CRJ701 ====
The baseline variant of the CRJ701 with an increased maximum passenger seating capacity of 70, a maximum takeoff weight (MTOW) of 72,750 pounds (33,000 kg) and a range of 1,434 nautical miles (2,656 km; 1,650 mi).

==== CRJ701ER ====
The "extended range" variant of the CRJ701 with an increased maximum passenger seating capacity of 70, a maximum takeoff weight (MTOW) of 75,000 pounds (34,000 kg) and a range of 1,732 nautical miles (3,208 km; 1,993 mi).

==== CRJ702 ====
The baseline variant of the CRJ702 with a further increased maximum passenger seating capacity of 78, a maximum takeoff weight (MTOW) of 72,750 pounds (33,000 kg).

==== CRJ702ER ====
The "extended range" variant of the CRJ702 with a further increased maximum passenger seating capacity of 78, a maximum takeoff weight (MTOW) of 75,000 pounds (34,000 kg).

==== CRJ550 ====
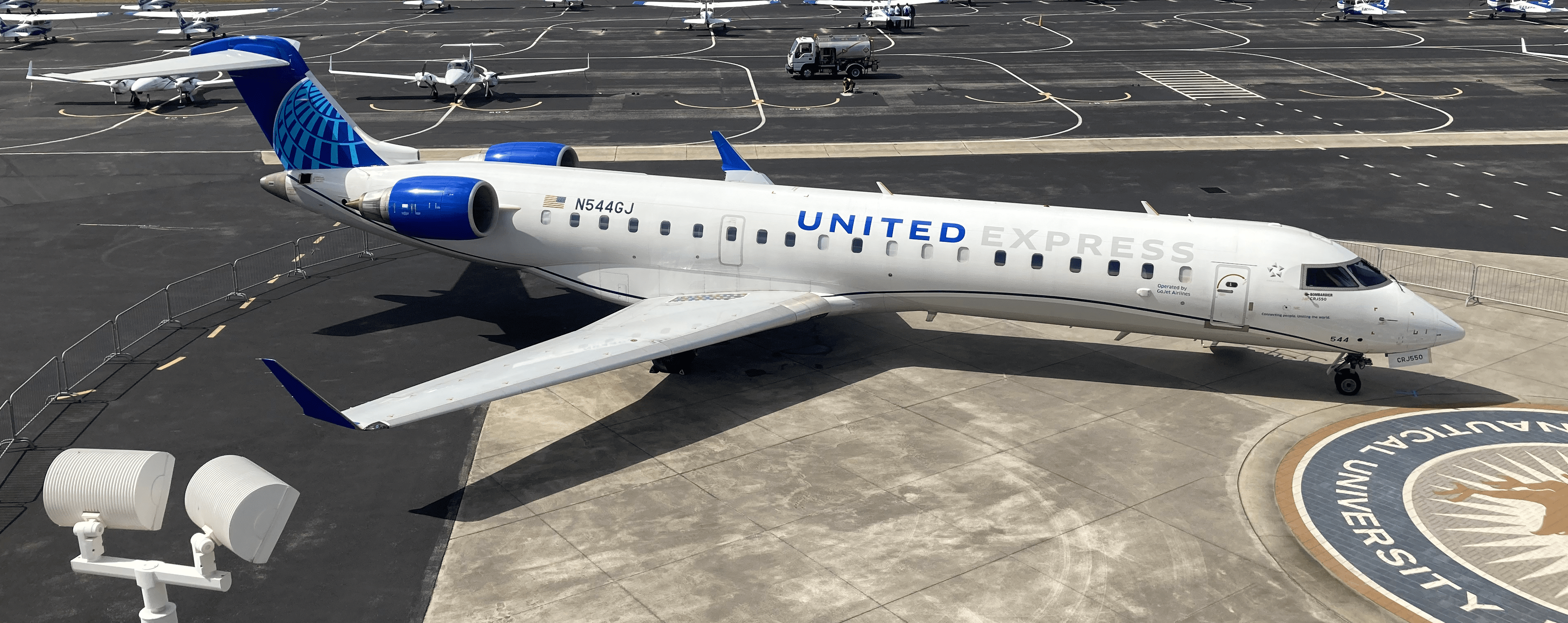
A Bombardier CRJ550 operated for United Express on display at Embry–Riddle Aeronautical University

The CRJ550 is a variant of the CRJ700 limited by type certification to just 50 passenger seats and a lower maximum takeoff weight (MTOW) of 65,000 pounds (29,000 kg), compared to the CRJ700's 75,000 pounds (34,000 kg). Bombardier introduced the first three-class 50-seat aircraft that complies with United's more stringent U.S. pilot contract scope clauses while offering premium seats.

All CRJ550s were converted from existing CRJ700s. The aircraft model is listed as CL-600-2C11 on the TCCA and FAA type certificates, after receiving certification in 2019. The CRJ550 has not yet been certified by EASA. Each converted CRJ550 has a supplemental aircraft identification data plate added next to the original data plate, reflecting its new model designation.

The variant was announced on 6 February 2019 with launch customer United Airlines, Operating as United Express, ordering 50 aircraft configured with 10 first class, 20 economy plus (extra legroom), and 20 economy seats. The first aircraft was delivered on 7 August 2019 ahead of FAA certification in September. These aircraft were initially operated by GoJet Airlines under the United Express brand.

In 2024, SkyWest Airlines also started operating a sizable fleet of CRJ550 aircraft. In July, it began introducing the first of 19 CRJ550s operating under the Delta Connection brand. In October, SkyWest announced it would operate an additional 40 CRJ550s under the United Express brand, including 11 previously operated by GoJet. In November 2024, SkyWest ordered 60 kits to convert aircraft into the CRJ550 configuration.

The reconfiguration addresses a shortcoming of the CRJ series: limited overhead storage. Four large storage cabinets are installed on the cabin floor, allowing passengers to stow their carry-on luggage inside the cabin. Aircraft with 50 or fewer seats require only one flight attendant. Because this aircraft has a sizable first-class section, where passengers might typically expect a flight attendant to be dedicated to only serving first-class passengers, the CRJ550 is equipped with a self-service galley area to be stocked with a selection of snacks and a refrigerator with non-alcoholic beverages, enabling first-class passengers to enjoy refreshments at their leisure, particularly when the flight attendant is serving the economy cabin.

=== CRJ900 series ===
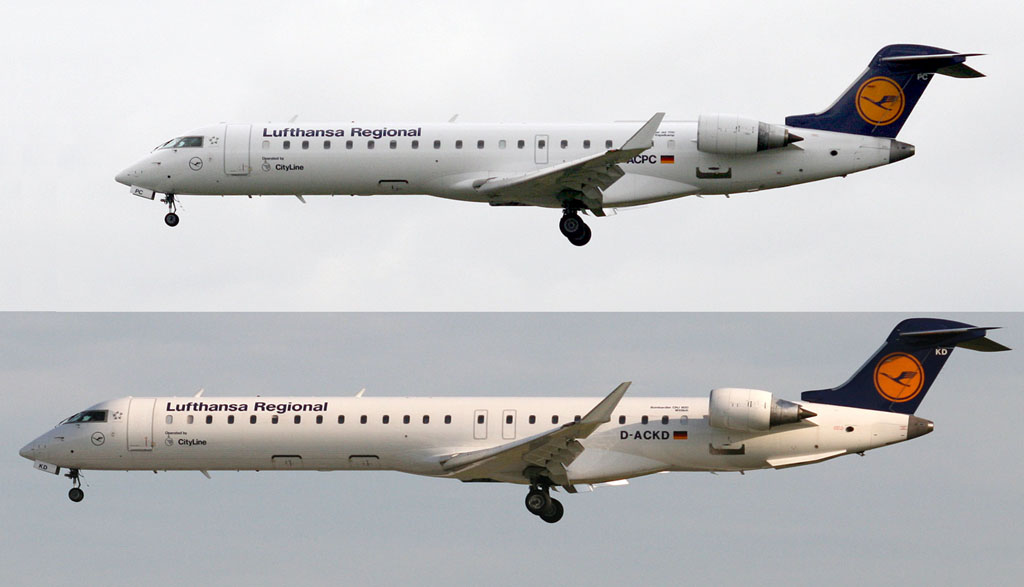
A comparison between the Bombardier CRJ700 (top) and the CRJ900 (bottom)

The CRJ900 is a stretched version of the CRJ700 with up to 90 seats. Internally designated as the RJX, the first CRJ900 (C-FRJX) was modified from the prototype CRJ700 by adding longer fuselage plugs fore and aft of the wings. It was later converted into the prototype CRJ1000 by replacing the fuselage plugs with longer plugs. The CRJ900 also features strakes located at the rear of the plane. The CRJ900 competes with the Embraer 175. Mesa Air Group was the launch customer for the CRJ900 painted in America West livery. The aircraft model is listed as CL-600-2D24 on the TCCA, FAA, and EASA Type Certificates.

The wing has been widened with additional leading-edge slats, while the tail features increased span and anhedral. The cabin floor has been lowered by 2 inches (5 cm), improving outward visibility by aligning the windows closer to eye level. A recirculation fan aids in cabin temperature control, and the environmental system uses a target temperature setting instead of a traditional hot-cold knob. The aircraft is equipped with a Honeywell RE220 auxiliary power unit, which provides increased airflow to the air conditioning packs and allows for higher altitude and engine start limits. Additionally, a second lavatory has been added at the front of the cabin.

The aircraft is powered by two GE CF34-8C5 engines, each producing of thrust with APR (automatic performance reserve). The engines are managed by a FADEC (full authority digital engine control) system, replacing traditional control cables and fuel-control units for improved efficiency and precision. In typical operations, the CRJ900 cruises 8,000 to 10,000 feet (2,400 to 3,000 m) higher than the CRJ700, with an average true airspeed of 450 to 500 knots (830 to 930 km/h; 520 to 580 mph) at the expense of slightly increased fuel burn. The aircraft has a maximum takeoff weight of 84,500 pounds (38,300 kg).

In 2018, the CRJ900 had a list price of $48 million, while its market value was approximately $24 million. However, most customers reportedly paid between $20 and $22 million, with American Airlines securing an order for 15 aircraft at under $20 million each. A six-year-old CRJ900 from 2012 was valued at less than $14 million, with projections indicating a 30% depreciation by 2021.

The CRJ900 family has four sub-variants:

==== CRJ900 ====
The baseline variant of the CRJ900 with a maximum takeoff weight (MTOW) of 80,500 pounds (36,500 kg) and a range of 1,350 nautical miles (2,500 km; 1,550 mi).

==== CRJ900ER ====
The "Extended Range" variant of the CRJ900 with an increased MTOW of 82,500 pounds (37,400 kg), enabling an increased range of 1,593 nautical miles (2,950 km; 1,833 mi).

==== CRJ900LR ====
The "Long Range" variant of the CRJ900 with a further increased MTOW of 84,500 pounds (38,300 kg), enabling an increased range of 1,828 nautical miles (3,385 km; 2,104 mi).

==== CRJ705 ====
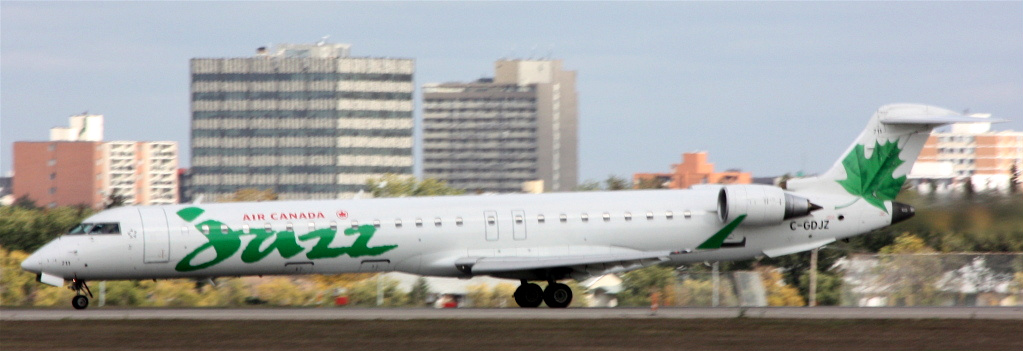
A Bombardier CRJ705 operated by Jazz Aviation

The CRJ705 was a variant of the CRJ900 regional jet limited by type certification to just 75 seats, to comply with Air Canada's pilot contract scope clause. Air Canada Jazz, a regional carrier operating under the Air Canada Express brand, served as the launch customer for this aircraft in 2005. These aircraft were configured with 10 business class and 65 economy class seats. The official designation for the CRJ705 on the TCCA and FAA Type Certificates was CL-600-2D15.

The CRJ705 variant was short-lived. In April 2016, Jazz Aviation announced a plan to convert them all to standard CRJ900 configuration with a slightly increased capacity of 76 with 12 business class and 64 economy class seats. By late February 2018, the conversion process was complete. All former CRJ705s received supplemental identification plates reflecting the change.

=== CRJ1000 series ===
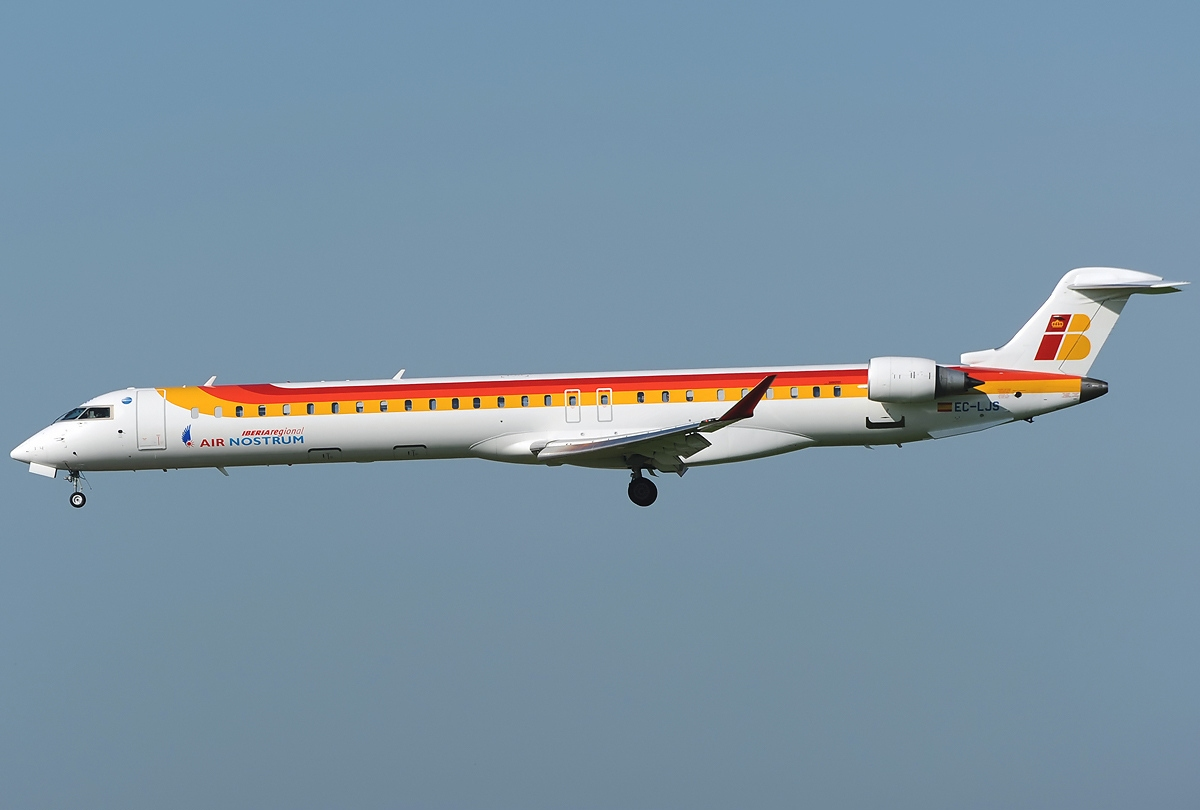
Air Nostrum CRJ1000, side view

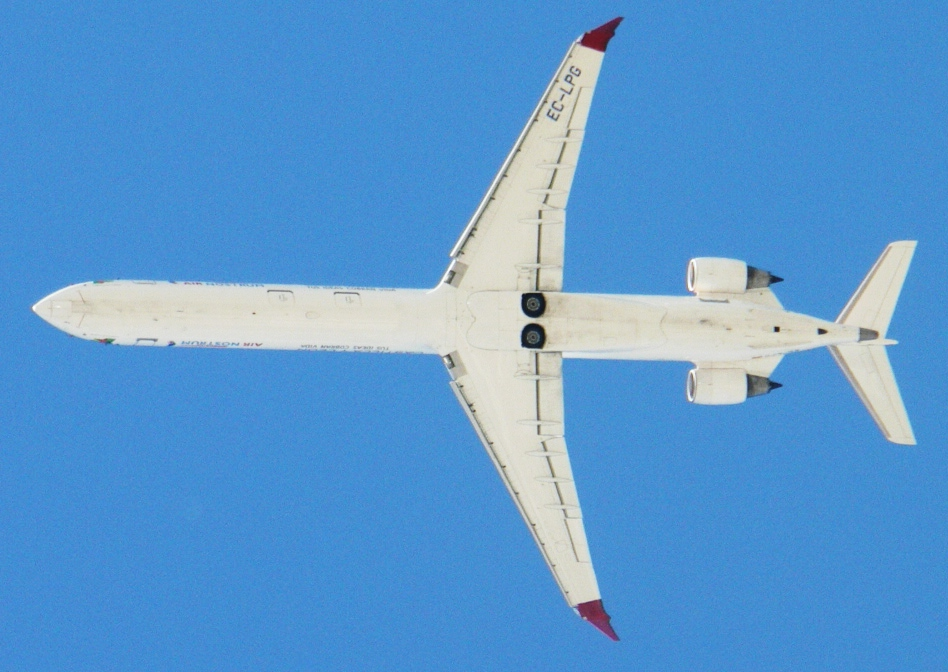
CRJ1000, planform view

On 19 February 2007, Bombardier launched the development of the CRJ1000, previously designated CRJ900X, as a stretched CRJ900, with up to 104 seats. The CRJ1000 completed its first production flight on 28 July 2009 in Montreal; the entry into service was planned for the first quarter of 2010. A month after the first flight, however, a fault in the rudder controls forced the flight-test program to be grounded; the program was not resumed until February 2010, and deliveries were projected to begin by January 2011. Brit Air and Air Nostrum were the launch customers for the CRJ1000.

Bombardier Aerospace announced on 10 November 2010 that its 100-seat CRJ1000 had been awarded aircraft type certificates by Transport Canada and the European Aviation Safety Agency, allowing deliveries to begin. On 14 December 2010, Bombardier began CRJ1000 deliveries to Brit Air and Air Nostrum. On 23 December 2010, it was announced that the Federal Aviation Administration had also awarded a type certificate, allowing the CRJ1000 to operate in US airspace. It has a separate type rating. Bombardier states that it offers better performance and a higher profit per seat than the competing Embraer E-190. The aircraft model is listed as CL-600-2E25 on the TCCA, FAA, and EASA Type Certificates.

In 2018, a new CRJ1000 discounted price was $24.8M, a 2015 model is valued $22.0M, a 2010 one is worth $15.5M for a $155,000 monthly lease, and it would be $12.0M in 2021 for a $145,000 monthly lease, while its D Check costs $800,000 and its engine overhaul costs $0.9 to 2.4M.

There are three variants of the CRJ1000:

==== CRJ1000 ====
The baseline variant of the CRJ1000 with a maximum takeoff weight (MTOW) of 90,000 pounds (41,000 kg) and a range of 1,457 nautical miles (2,698 km; 1,677 mi).

==== CRJ1000ER ====
The "Extended Range" variant of the CRJ1000 with an increased MTOW of 91,800 pounds (41,600 kg), enabling an increased range of 1,657 nautical miles (3,069 km; 1,907 mi). Its first customer is Garuda Indonesia.

==== CRJ1000EL ====
The "EuroLite" variant of the CRJ1000 has a reduced MTOW of 80,969 pounds (36,727 kg) to minimize weight-related charges for European operators. Consequently, the range on the EuroLite is reduced to 1,030 nautical miles (1,910 km; 1,190 mi). Its first customer is Air France–KLM regional subsidiary Brit Air.

=== Comparison of variants ===
Below is a list of major differences between the CRJ-700 series variants.

Variant	CRJ550	CRJ700	CRJ705	CRJ900	CRJ1000
Max. seating capacity	50	68 to 78	75	90	104
Cargo capacity	547 cu ft (15.5 m^{3}); 5,375 lb (2,438 kg)		594 cu ft (16.8 m^{3}); 6,075 lb (2,756 kg)		683 cu ft (19.4 m^{3}); 7,180 lb (3,257 kg)
Length	106 ft 1 in (32.3 m)		118 ft 11 in (36.2 m)		128 ft 5 in (39.1 m)
Wingspan	76 ft 3 in (23.2 m)		81 ft 7 in (24.9 m)		85 ft 11 in (26.2 m)
Wing area	760 sq ft (70.6 m^{2})		765 sq ft (71.1 m^{2})		833 sq ft (77.4 m^{2})
MTOW	65,000 lb (29,484 kg)	ER: 75,000 lb (34,019 kg)	80,500 lb (36,514 kg)	LR: 84,500 lb (38,330 kg)	ER: 91,800 lb (41,640 kg)
Operating empty	43,455 lb (19,711 kg)	44,245 lb (20,069 kg)	47,410 lb (21,504 kg)	48,160 lb (21,845 kg)	51,120 lb (23,188 kg)
Max. payload	15,545 lb (7,051 kg)	18,055 lb (8,190 kg)	22,590 lb (10,247 kg)	LR: 22,590 lb (10,247 kg)	26,380 lb (11,966 kg)
Max. fuel	19,595 lb (8,888 kg)				19,450 lb (8,822 kg)
Engines (2×)	GE CF34-8C5B1		GE CF34-8C5		GE CF34-8C5A1
Thrust (2×) (Note: APR, ISA +15 °C flat-rated)	13,790 lbf (61.3 kN)		14,510 lbf (64.5 kN)		
Max. speed	Mach .825 (473 kn, 876 km/h, 544 mph)		Mach .82 (470 kn, 871 km/h, 541 mph)		
Range (Note: 225 lb (102 kg) per pax.)	1,000 nmi (1,852 km; 1,151 mi)	1,434 to 2,032 nmi (2,656 to 3,763 km; 1,650 to 2,338 mi)	1,350 to 1,828 nmi (2,500 to 3,385 km; 1,554 to 2,104 mi)		1,457 to 1,657 nmi (2,698 to 3,069 km; 1,677 to 1,907 mi)
Takeoff (Note: ISA, SL, MTOW)	4,056 ft (1,236 m)	4,975 to 5,265 ft (1,516 to 1,605 m)	5,775 to 6,360 ft (1,760 to 1,939 m)		6,155 to 6,955 ft (1,876 to 2,120 m)
Landing (Note: ISA, SL, MLW.)	4,710 ft (1,436 m)	5,040 ft (1,540 m)	5,260 to 5,355 ft (1,603 to 1,632 m)		5,750 ft (1,750 m)

== Operators ==
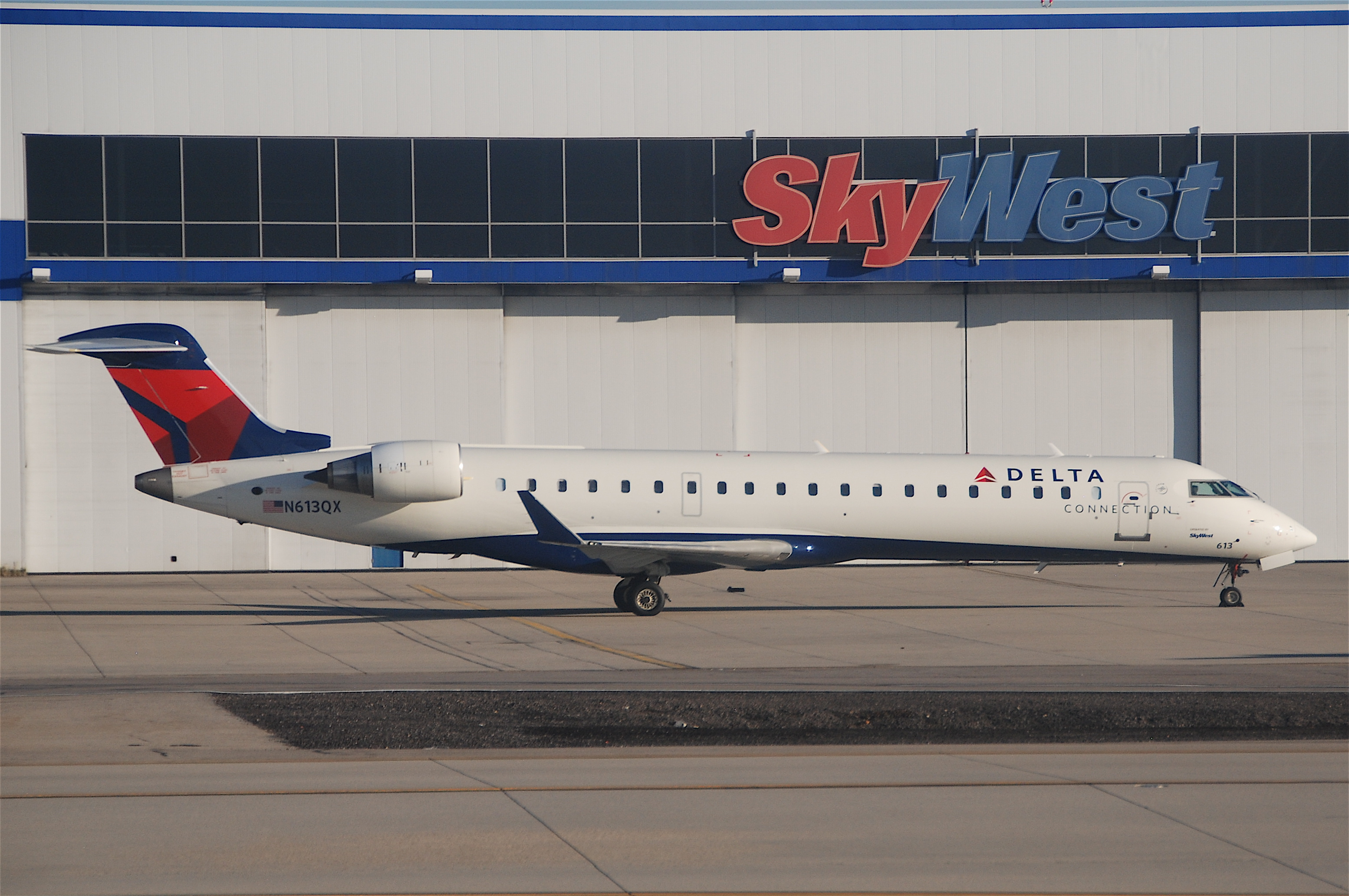
SkyWest Airlines is the largest operator of the series, operating them for Delta Connection (pictured), American Eagle, and United Express.

As of July 2019, 266 CRJ700 aircraft (all variants), 444 CRJ900 aircraft (all variants), and 62 CRJ1000 aircraft were in airline service with SkyWest Airlines (143), Endeavor Air (114), PSA Airlines (108), Mesa Airlines (84), and other operators with fewer aircraft of the type.

=== Deliveries ===
Model series	Deliveries
CRJ700 and CRJ550	330
CRJ705	16
CRJ900	487
CRJ1000	63
Total	896

Data as of 1 January 2021.

== Accidents and incidents ==
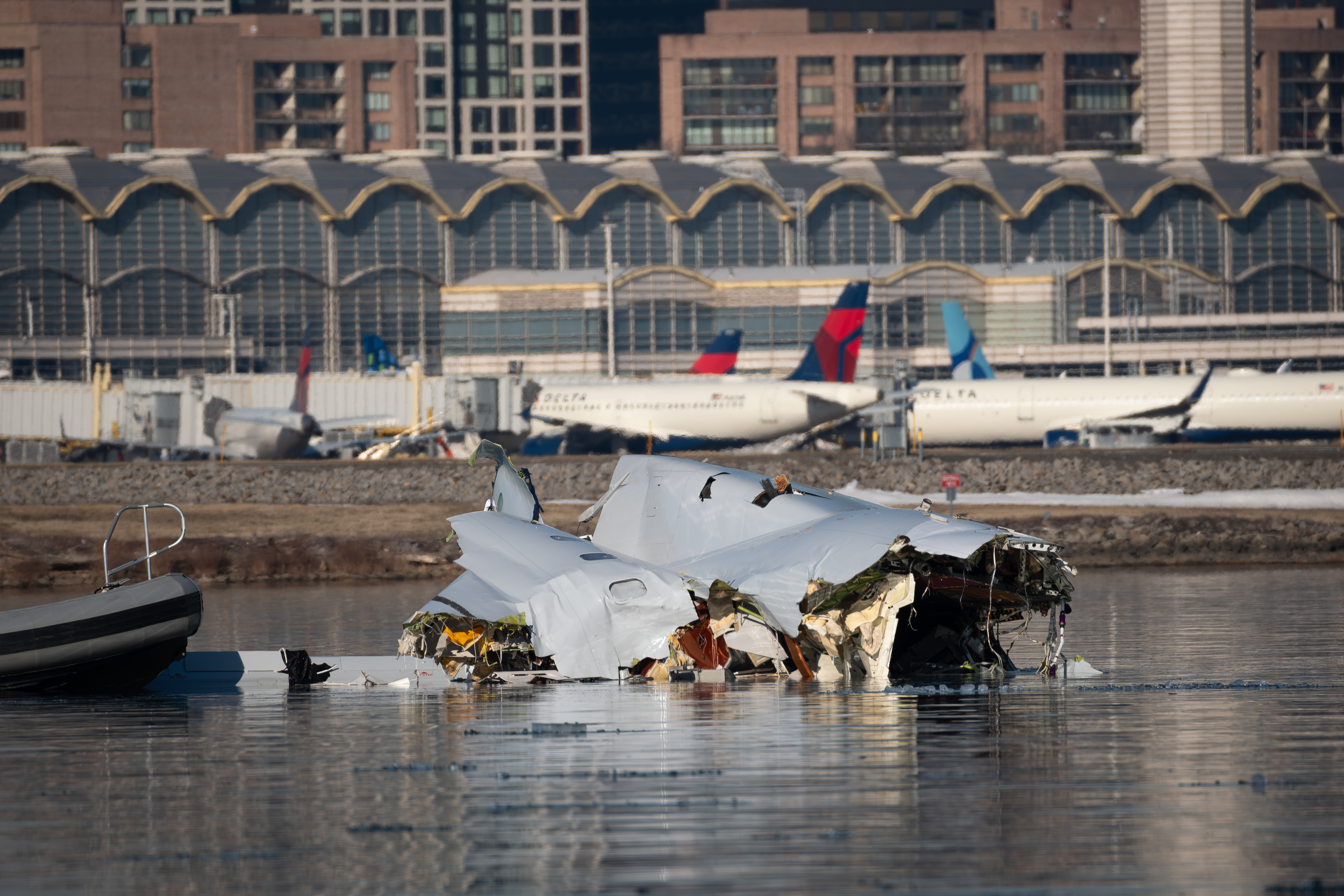
Remains of American Eagle Flight 5342 in the Potomac River, Washington, D.C.

- On 29 January 2025, American Eagle Flight 5342, a CRJ701ER registered as N709PS, carrying 64 people, collided with a United States Army Sikorsky UH-60 Black Hawk helicopter while approaching Ronald Reagan Washington National Airport, causing both aircraft to crash into the Potomac River. All 67 passengers and crew on both aircraft were killed (64 on the CRJ700 and 3 on the Black Hawk). It was the third hull loss and first fatal accident involving the Bombardier CRJ700 series.
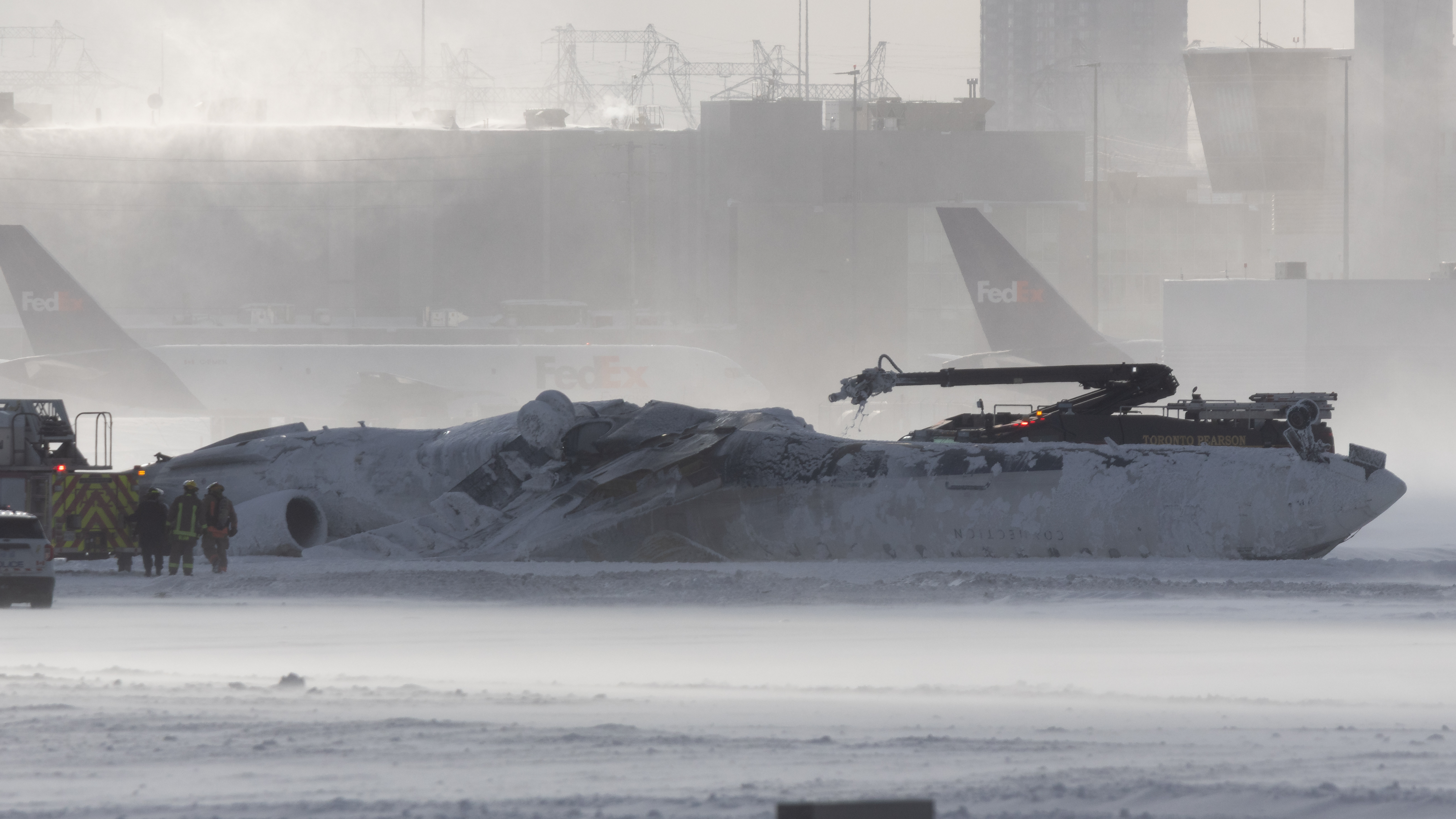
  Delta Connection Flight 4819 aircraft upside-down on Toronto Pearson International Airport runway 23
- On 17 February 2025, Delta Connection Flight 4819, a CRJ900LR registered as N932XJ, crashed on landing at Toronto Pearson International Airport, coming to rest upside-down. The plane lost its right wing and tail fin. There were no fatalities among the 80 passengers and crew, but the aircraft was damaged beyond repair.
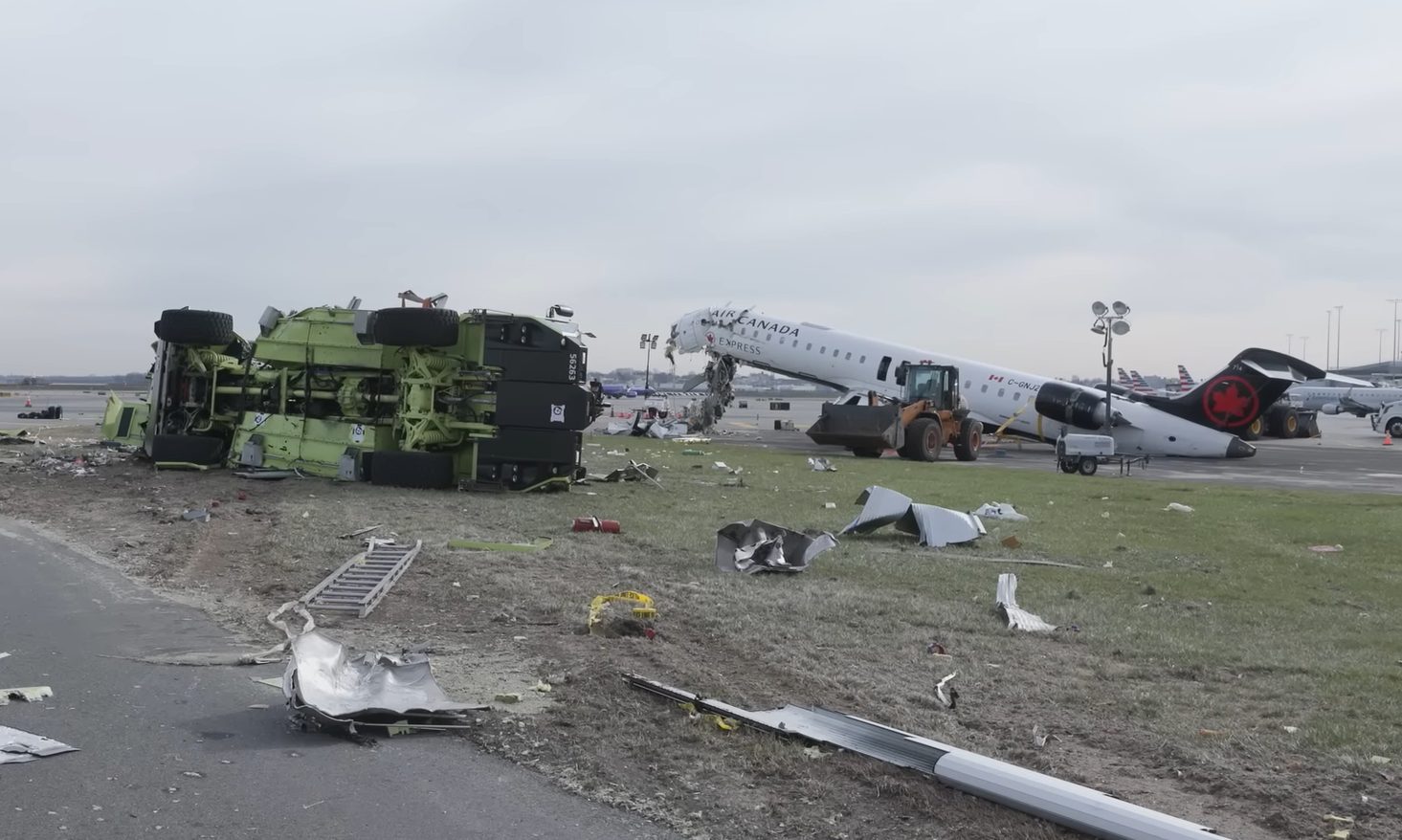
  Wreckage of Air Canada Express Flight 8646 and the ARFF truck it hit, sitting at LaGuardia Airport runway 04.
- On 22 March 2026, Air Canada Express Flight 8646 operated by Jazz Aviation, a CRJ900LR registered as C-GNJZ, carrying 76 people, collided with a firetruck responding to a separate emergency while landing at LaGuardia Airport, destroying the cockpit. There were two fatalities: the captain and the co-pilot. There were 41 total injuries. This marks the first fatal accident of a CRJ900.

== Specifications (CRJ900) ==
Data from

General characteristics

- Crew: 2
- Capacity: 90 passengers and 16.8 m^{3} (594 cu ft) or 2,756 kg (6,075 lb) of cargo
- Length: 36.2 m (118 ft 11 in)
- Wingspan: 24.9 m (81 ft 7 in)
- Width: 2.7 m (8 ft 10 in)
- Height: 7.5 m (24 ft 7 in)
- Wing area: 71.1 m^{2} (765 sq ft)
- Empty weight: 31,751 kg (70,000 lb)
- Max takeoff weight: 38,330 kg (84,500 lb)
- Fuel capacity: 8,888 kg (19,595 lb)
- Powerplant: 2 × GE CF34-8C5 high-bypass turbofan, 64.5 kN (14,510 lbf) thrust each

Performance

- Maximum speed: 871 km/h (541 mph, 470 kn)
- Maximum speed: Mach 0.82
- Cruise speed: 829 km/h (515 mph, 447 kn)
- Range: 2,871 km (1,784 mi, 1,550 nmi)
- Service ceiling: 12,497 m (41,000 ft)
- Takeoff distance: 1,770 m (5,820 ft)
- Landing distance: 1,630 m (5,360 ft)

== See also ==
Related development

- Bombardier CRJ200
- Bombardier Challenger 600

Aircraft of comparable role, configuration, and era

- Antonov An-148
- Comac C909
- Embraer E-Jet family
- Fairchild-Dornier 728 family
- Fokker 70/100
- Mitsubishi MRJ 70/MRJ 90
- Sukhoi Superjet 100
- Tupolev Tu-334

Related lists

- List of jet airliners
- List of Bombardier CRJ operators

== Notable appearances in media ==
In 2006, the CRJ700 was featured in Microsoft Flight Simulator X as one of the default aircraft.
