= Brit Air =

Regional airline of France (1973–2017)

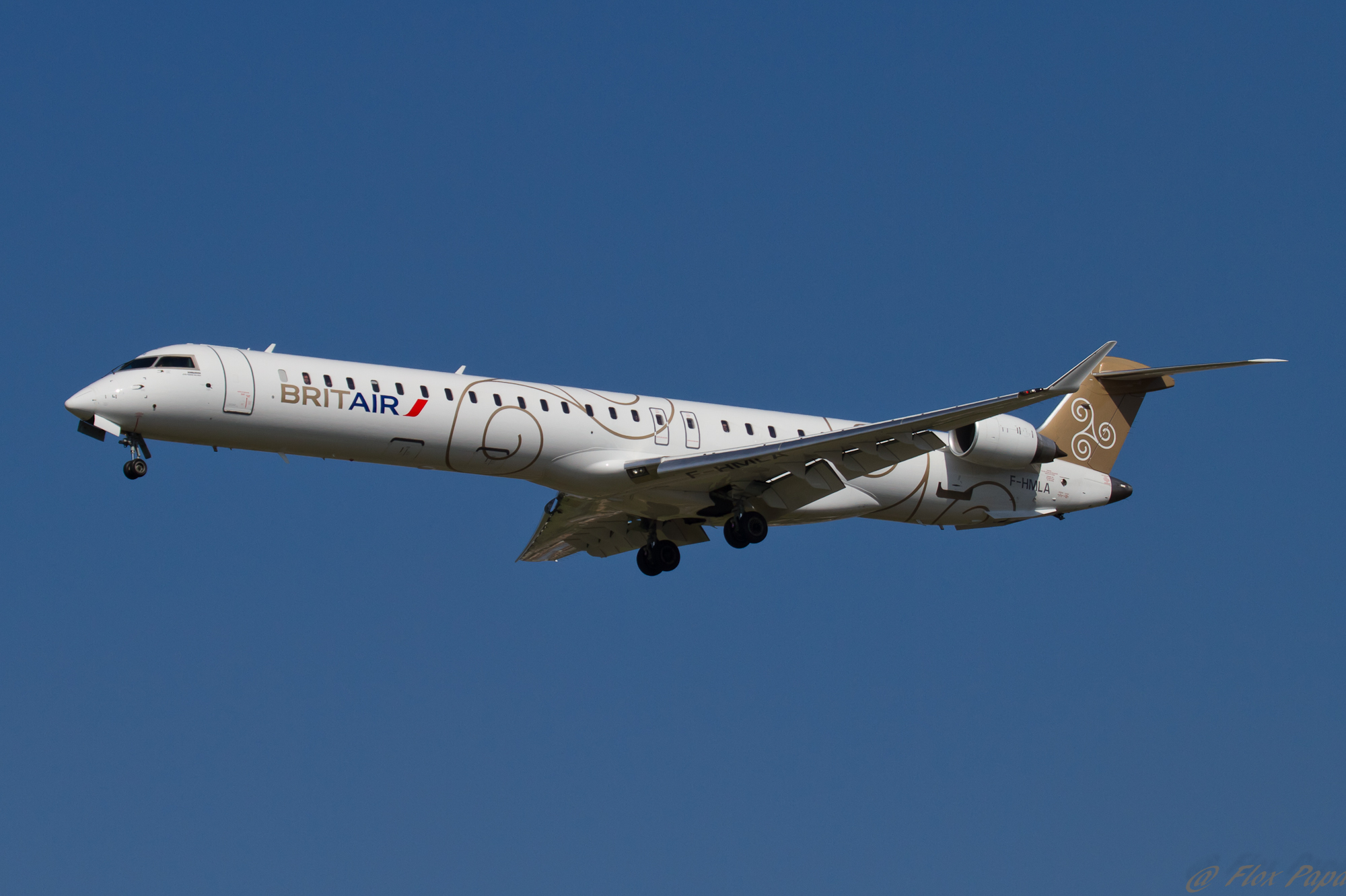
- Bombardier CRJ1000
IATA	ICAO	Call sign
DB	BZH	BRITAIR
- Founded: 1973
- Commenced operations: 1975
- Ceased operations: March 2017 (merged with Airlinair and Régional to form Air France Hop)
- Hubs: Lyon; Paris–Charles de Gaulle; Paris–Orly
- Frequent-flyer program: Flying Blue
- Alliance: SkyTeam (affiliate)
- Parent company: Air France-KLM
- Headquarters: Morlaix – Ploujean Airport; Ploujean, Morlaix, Brittany, France

Brit Air (French pronunciation: [bʁit‿ɛːʁ]), short for Brittany Air International, was a regional airline based at Morlaix – Ploujean Airport in Ploujean, Morlaix, Brittany, France, operating scheduled services as an Air France franchise from Lyon–Saint Exupéry Airport, Paris-Orly Airport and Paris-Charles de Gaulle Airport.

The airline, along with Régional and Airlinair, was fully merged with HOP! since 2017 after a year of negotiations.

== History ==
Since 31 March 2013, all Brit Air flights are operated under the HOP! name, Air France's new regional brand name.

Brit Air ceased all flight operations in March 2017 after its merger with HOP!.

== Destinations ==
Brit Air operated the following services (as of March 2013):

Country	City	IATA	ICAO	Airport	Notes
Croatia	Zagreb	ZAG	LDZA	Zagreb Airport	
Czech Republic	Prague	PRG	LKPR	Václav Havel Airport Prague	
Denmark	Copenhagen	CPH	EKCH	Copenhagen Airport	
France	Brest	BES	LFRB	Brest Bretagne Airport	
France	Caen	CFR	LFRK	Caen - Carpiquet Airport	
France	Limoges	LIG	LFBL	Limoges - Bellegarde Airport	
France	Lorient	LRT	LFRH	Lorient South Brittany Airport	
France	Lyon	LYS	LFLL	Lyon–Saint-Exupéry Airport	Hub
France	Marseille	MRS	LFML	Marseille Provence Airport	
France	Montpellier	MPL	LFMT	Montpellier–Méditerranée Airport	
France	Nantes	NTE	LFRS	Nantes Atlantique Airport	
France	Nice	NCE	LFMN	Nice Côte d'Azur Airport	
France	Paris	CDG	LFPG	Charles de Gaulle Airport	Hub
France	Paris	ORY	LFPO	Orly Airport	Hub
France	Quimper	UIP	LFRQ	Quimper–Cornouaille Airport	
France	Rennes	RNS	LFRN	Rennes–Saint-Jacques Airport	
France	Rodez	RDZ	LFCR	Rodez–Aveyron Airport	
France	Strasbourg	SXB	LFST	Strasbourg Airport	
France	Toulouse	TLS	LFBO	Toulouse–Blagnac Airport	
France	Tarbes	LDE	LFBT	Tarbes–Lourdes–Pyrénées Airport	
Germany	Düsseldorf	DUS	EDDL	Düsseldorf Airport	
Germany	Hamburg	HAM	EDDH	Hamburg Airport	
Italy	Florence	FLR	LIRQ	Florence Airport	
Italy	Genoa	GOA	LIMJ	Genoa Cristoforo Colombo Airport	
Italy	Rome	FCO	LIRF	Rome Fiumicino Airport	
Spain	Barcelona	BCN	LEBL	Josep Tarradellas Barcelona–El Prat Airport	
Spain	Bilbao	BIO	LEBB	Bilbao Airport	

== Fleet ==
Over the years, the airline has operated various aircraft types including:

Brit Air historic fleet
Aircraft	Introduced	Retired
ATR 42	1986	2005
ATR 72	1991	2003
Bombardier CRJ100	1995	
Bombardier CRJ700	2001	
Bombardier CRJ900	2010	2011
Bombardier CRJ1000	2010	
Fairchild Hiller FH-227		
Fokker F27		
Fokker F28		
Fokker 100	1999	2011
Saab 340	1987	1998

=== Photographic gallery ===
in chronological and livery order

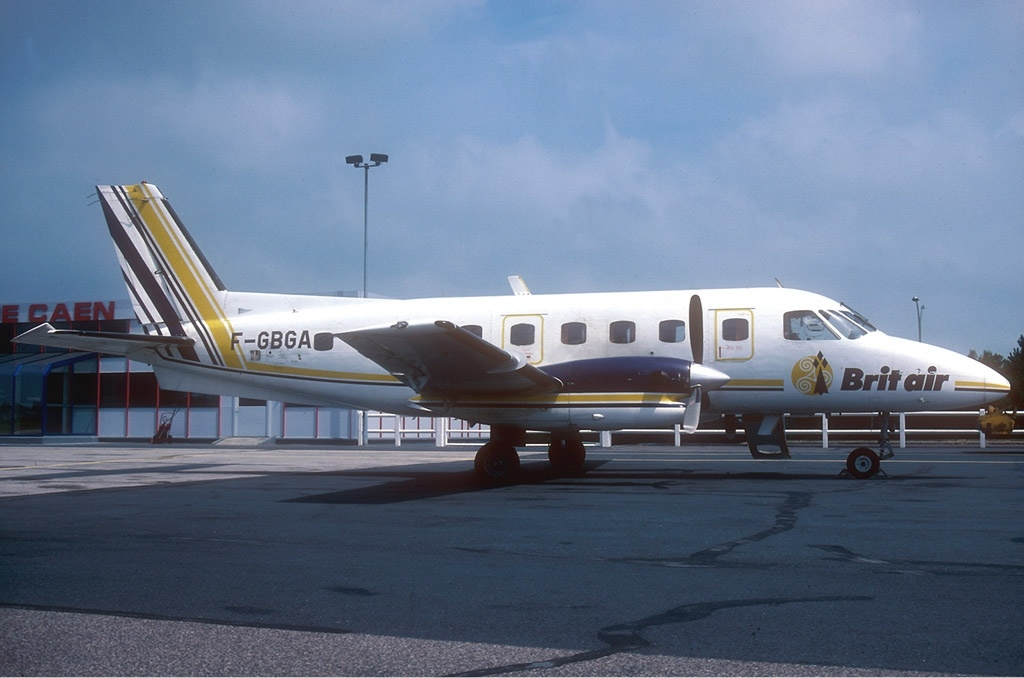
Embraer EMB-110 Bandeirante

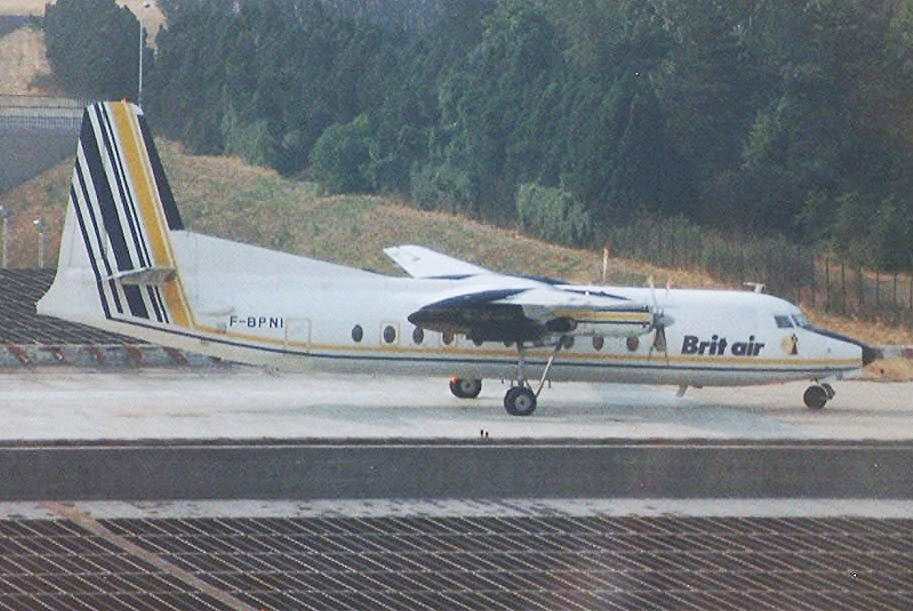
Fokker F27 Friendship

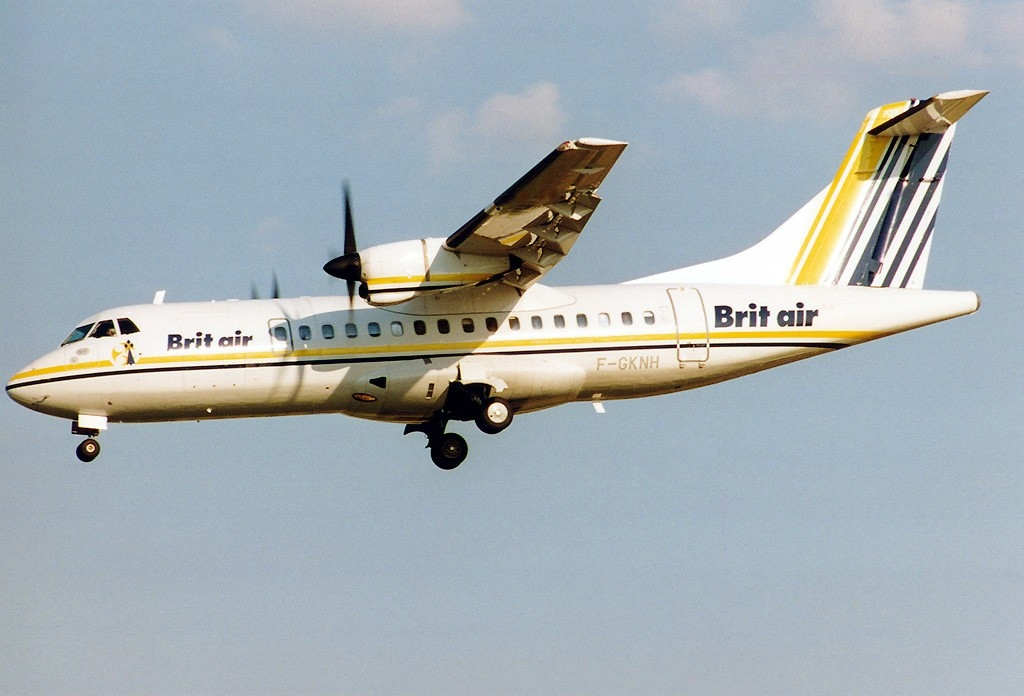
ATR 42-300

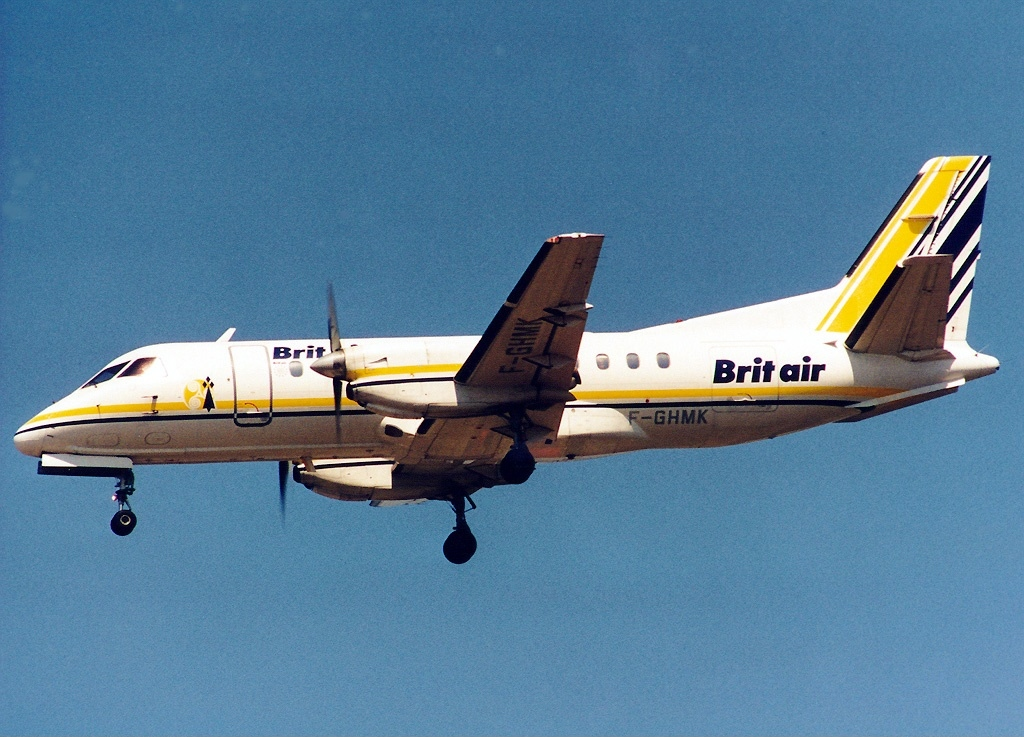
Saab 340

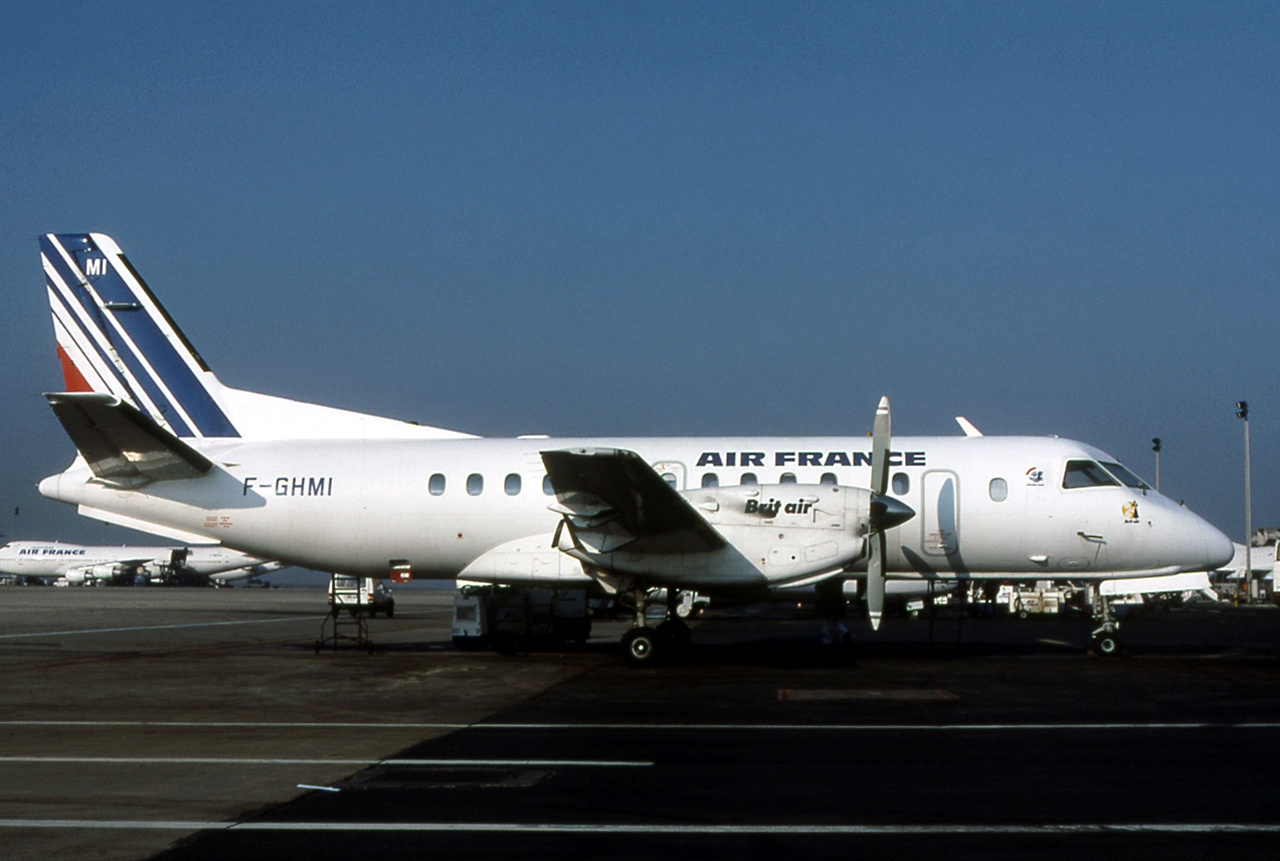
Saab 340 operated on behalf of Air France

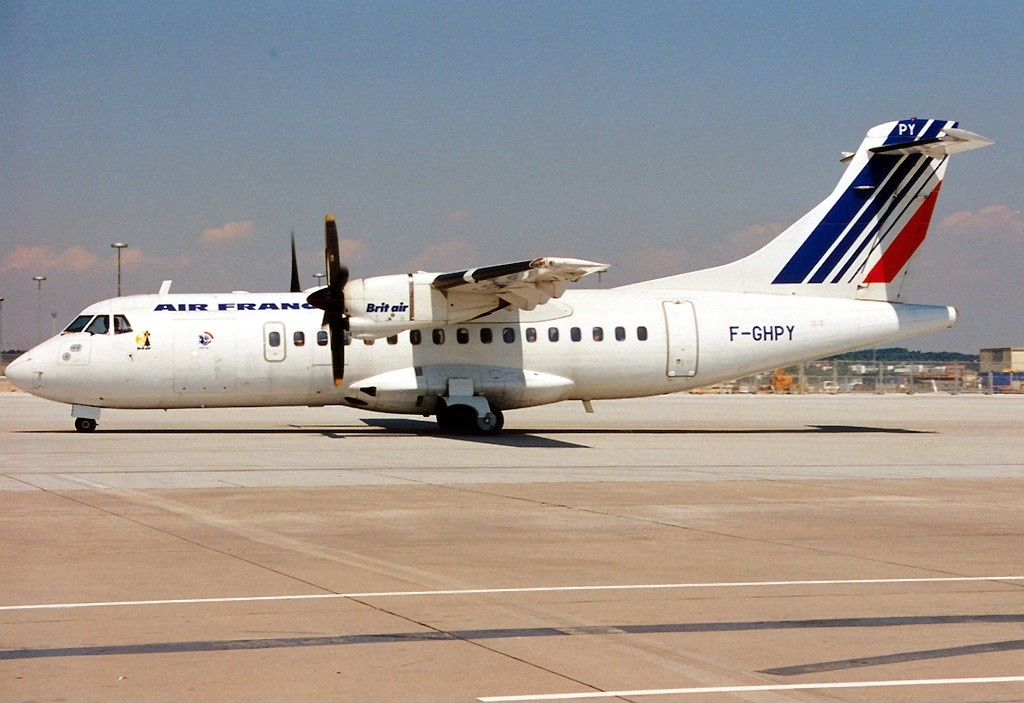
ATR 42-300 operated on behalf of Air France

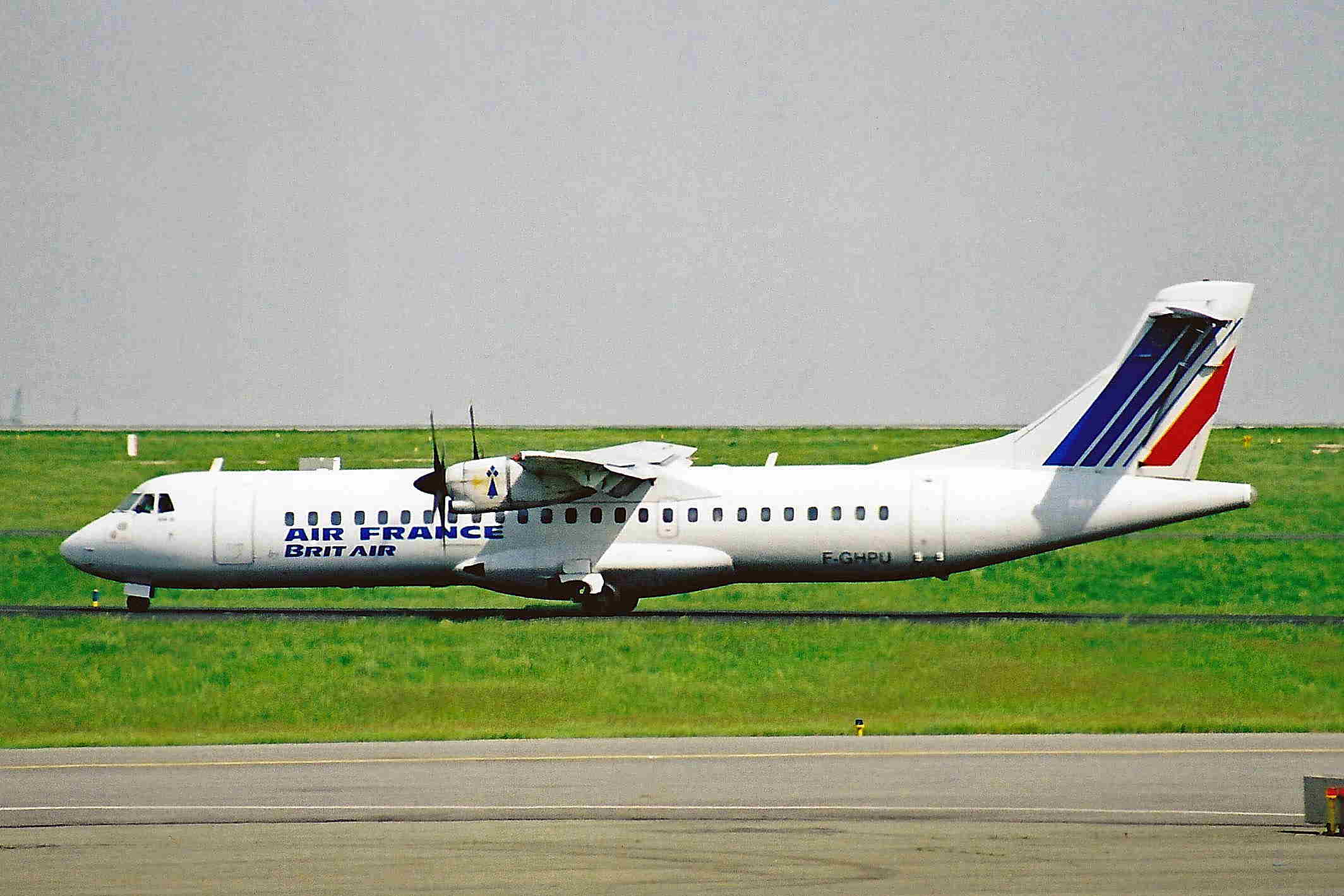
ATR 72-201 operated on behalf of Air France

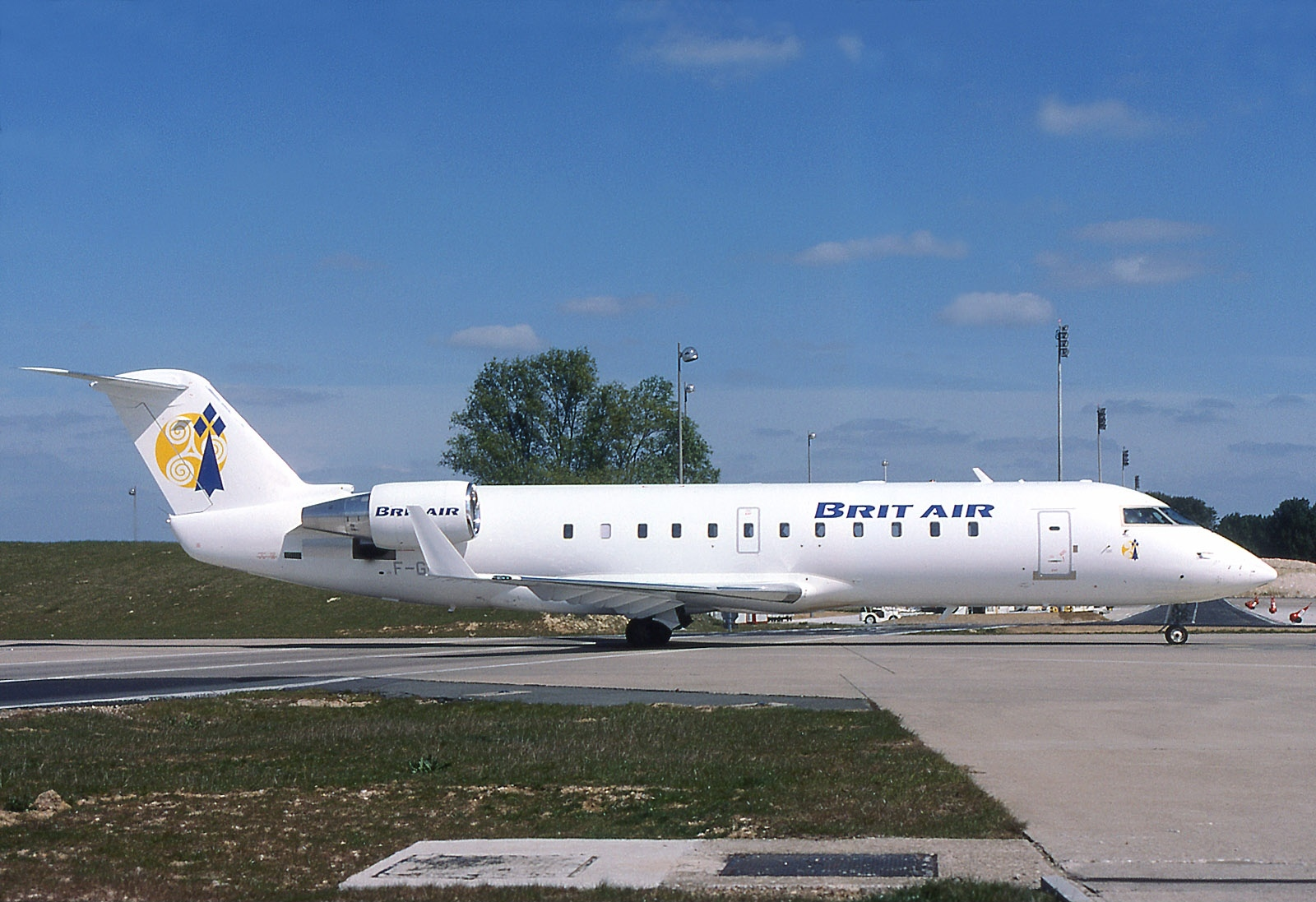
Bombardier CRJ100

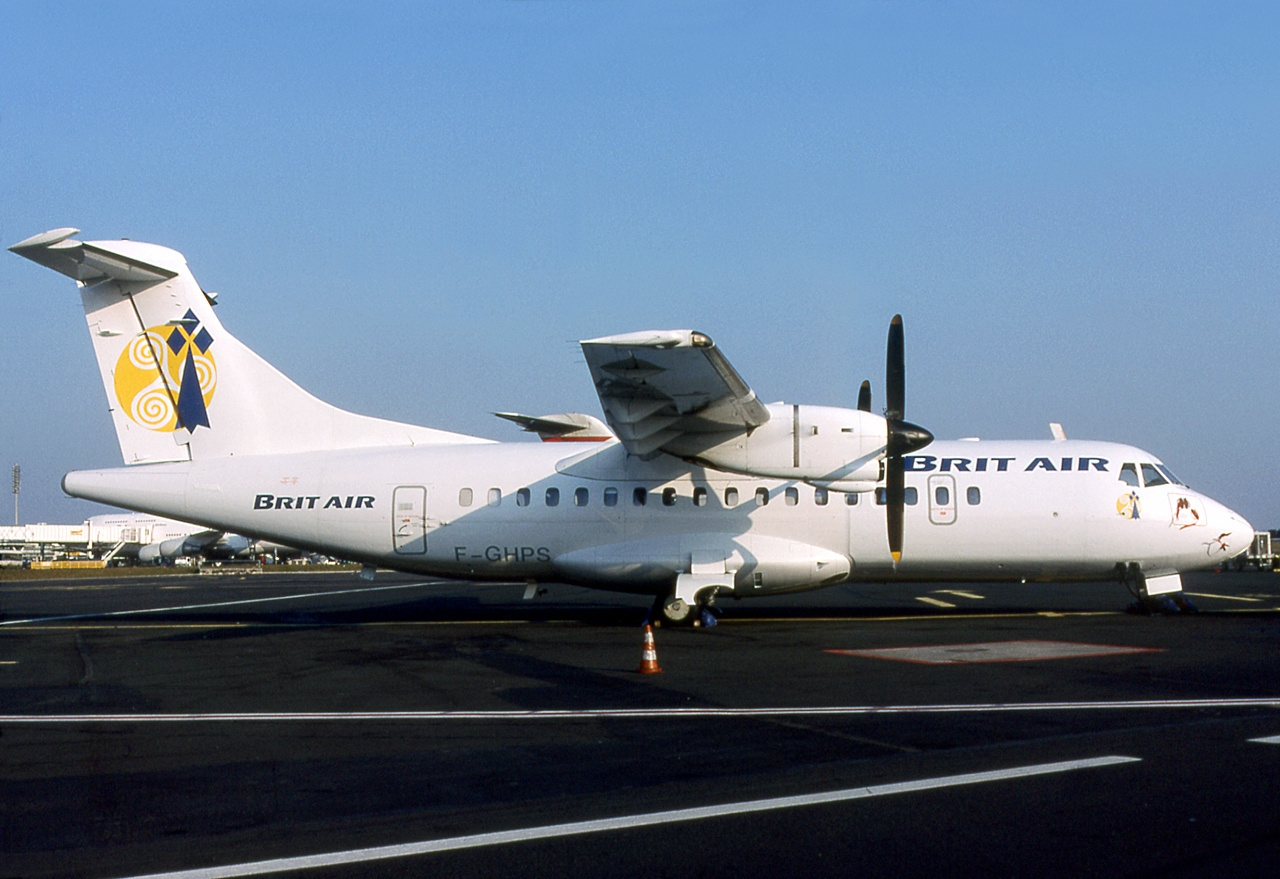
ATR 42-300

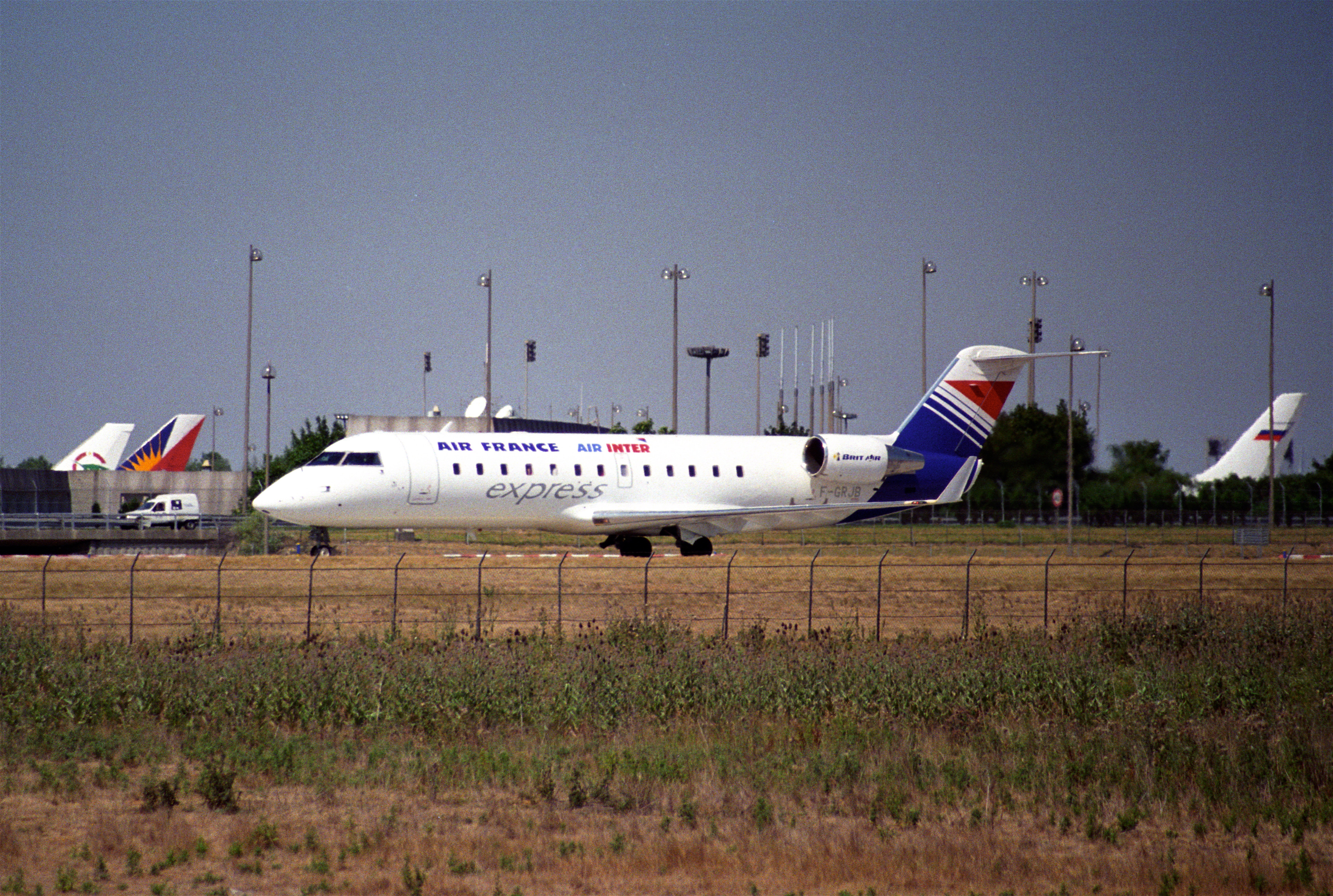
Bombardier CRJ100 operated on behalf of Air France and Air Inter

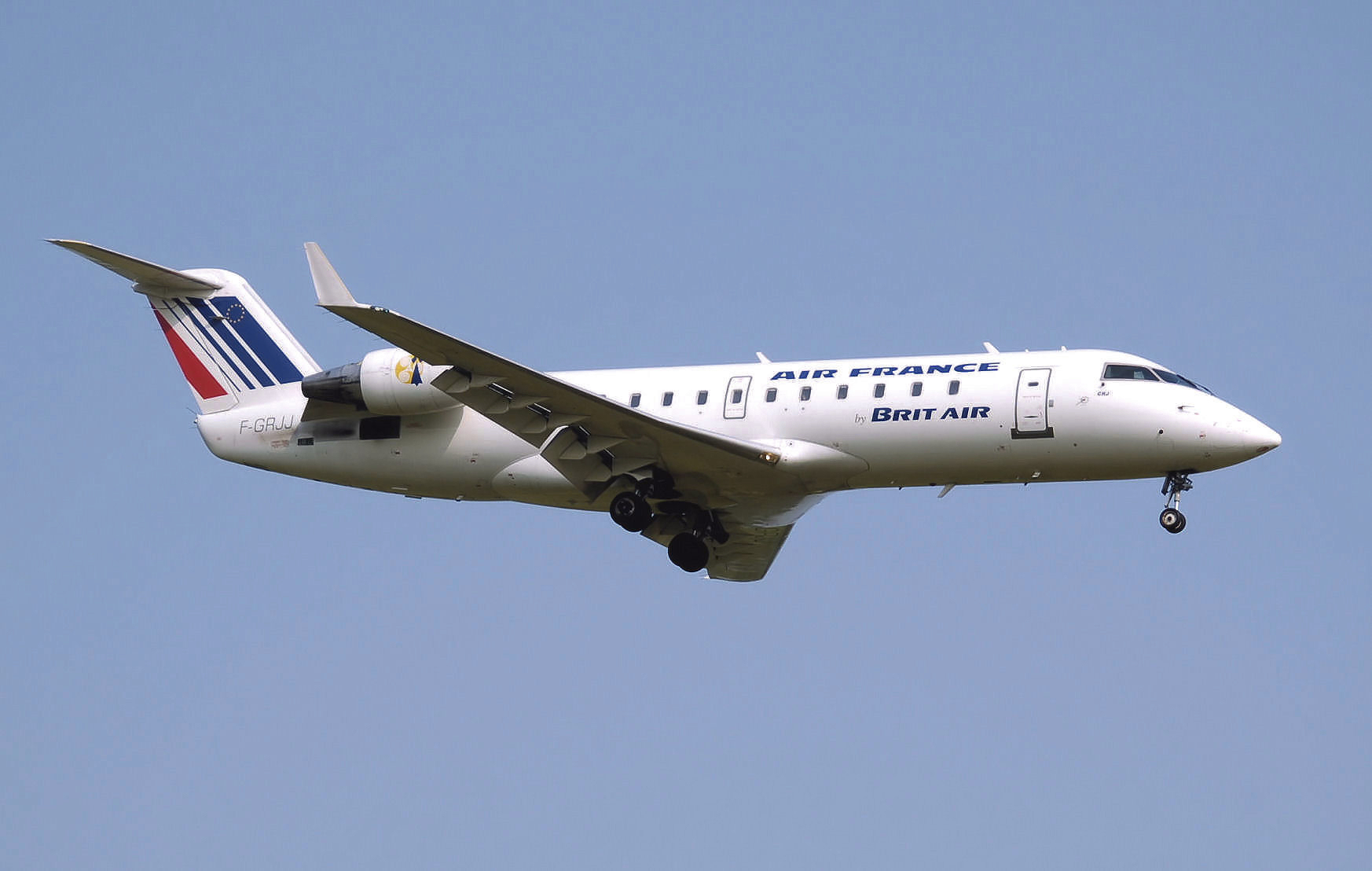
Bombardier CRJ100 operated on behalf of Air France

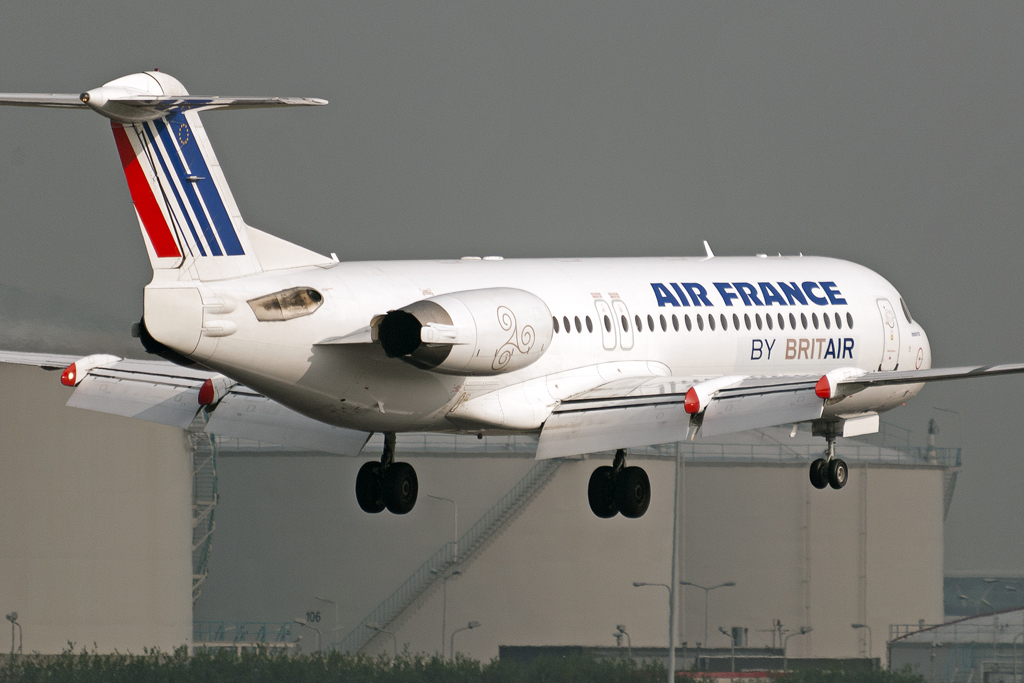
Fokker F28 Fellowship operated on behalf of Air France

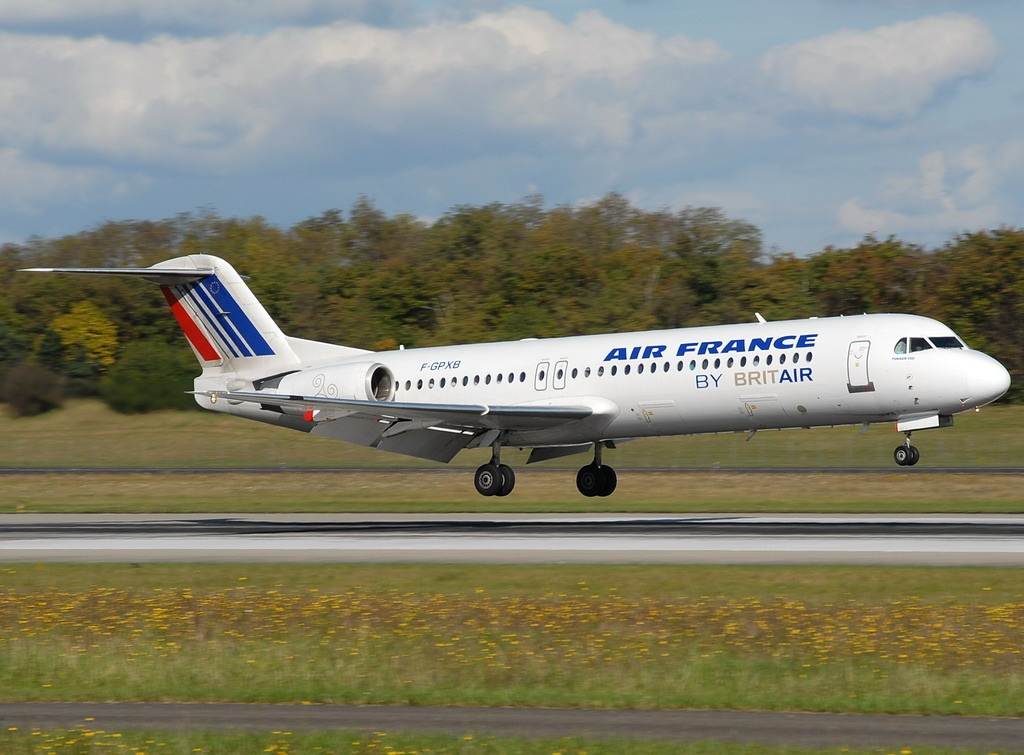
Fokker F100 operated on behalf of Air France

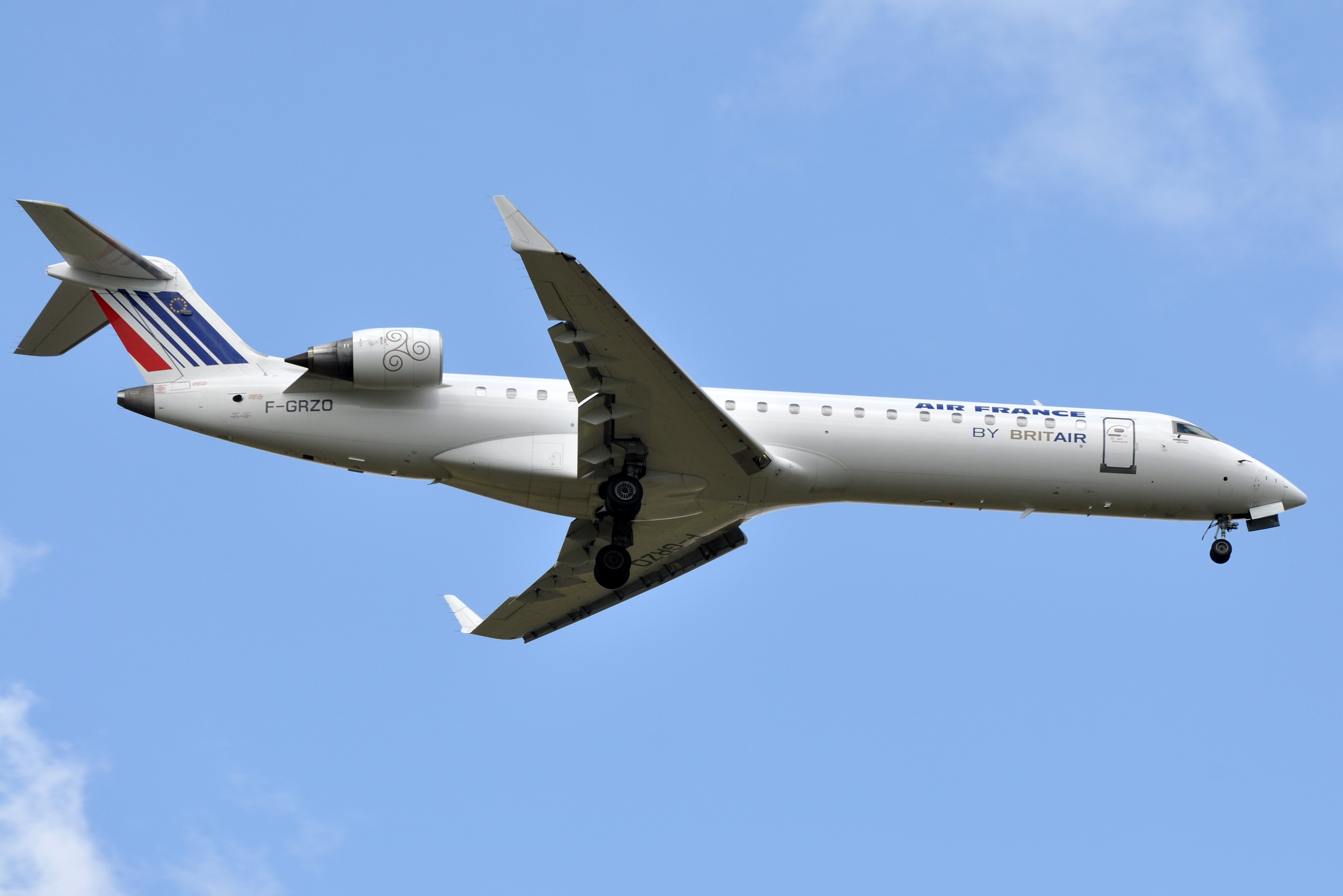
Bombardier CRJ700 operated on behalf of Air France

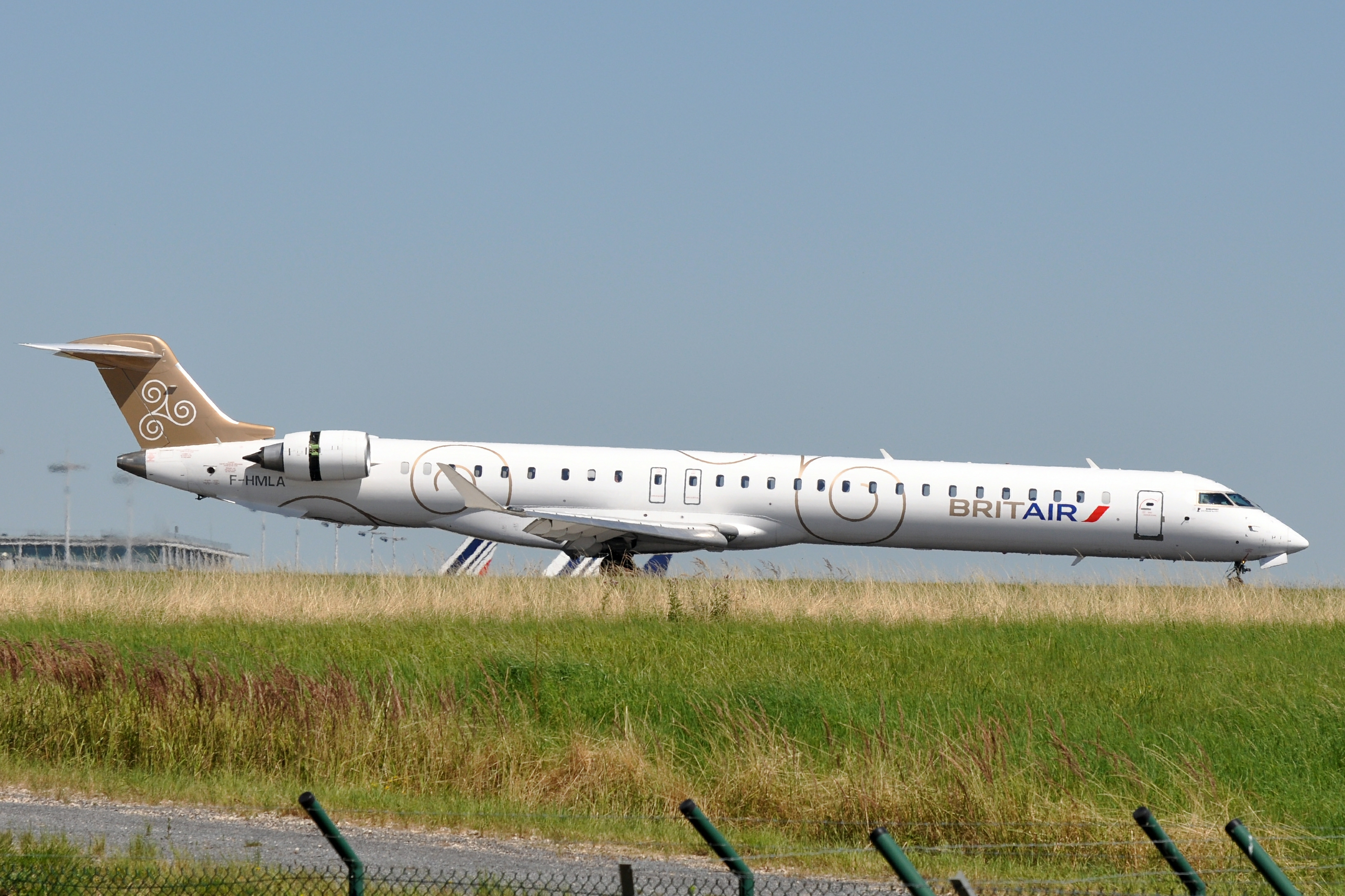
Bombardier CRJ1000

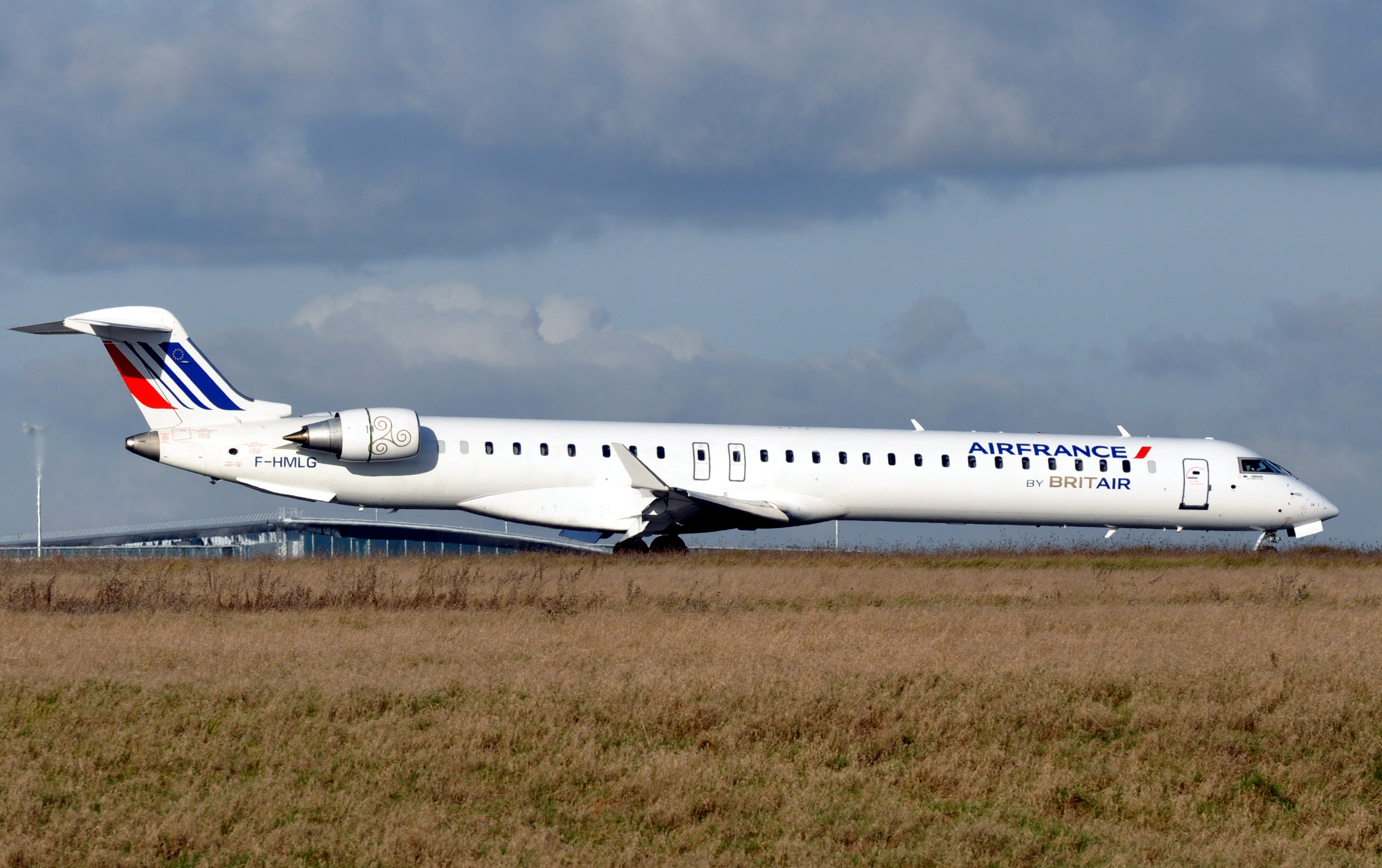
Bombardier CRJ1000 operated on behalf of Air France

== Incidents and accidents ==
On 22 June 2003, Air France Flight 5672 from Nantes to Brest, which was operated by a Brit Air CRJ100, crashed 2.3 miles short of the runway when attempting to land at Brest Bretagne Airport at 23:55 local time, resulting in the death of the captain. The aircraft involved (registered F-GRJS) subsequently caught fire (after all 21 passengers on board had been evacuated) and was damaged beyond repair. The most probable cause of the accident was declared to be pilot error, as the instrument approach had not been executed correctly.
