= Regional jet =

Small jet airliner

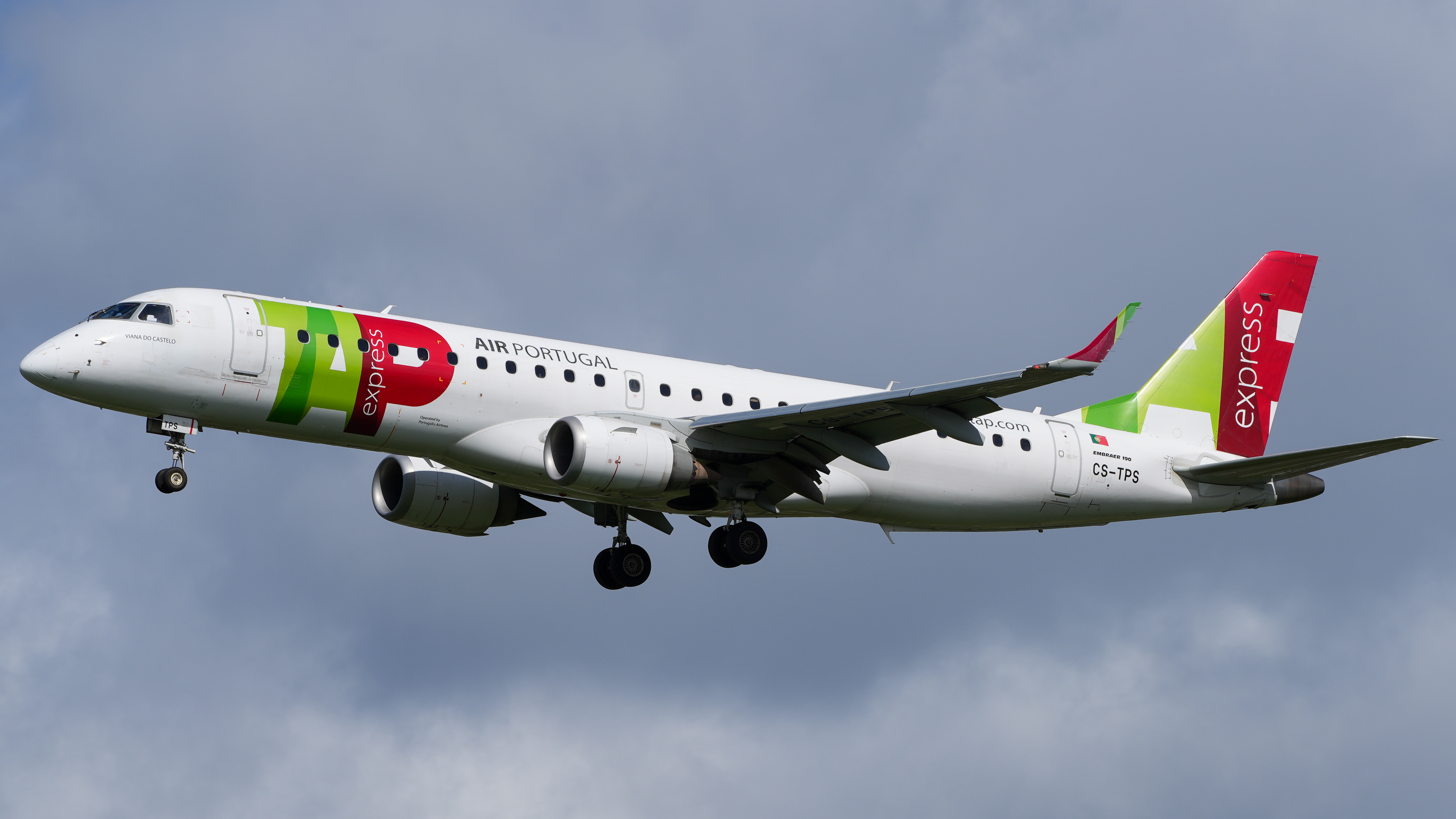
With more than 2900 aircraft delivered the Embraer E-Jet/E-Jet E2s are the most successful family of regional jets produced to date

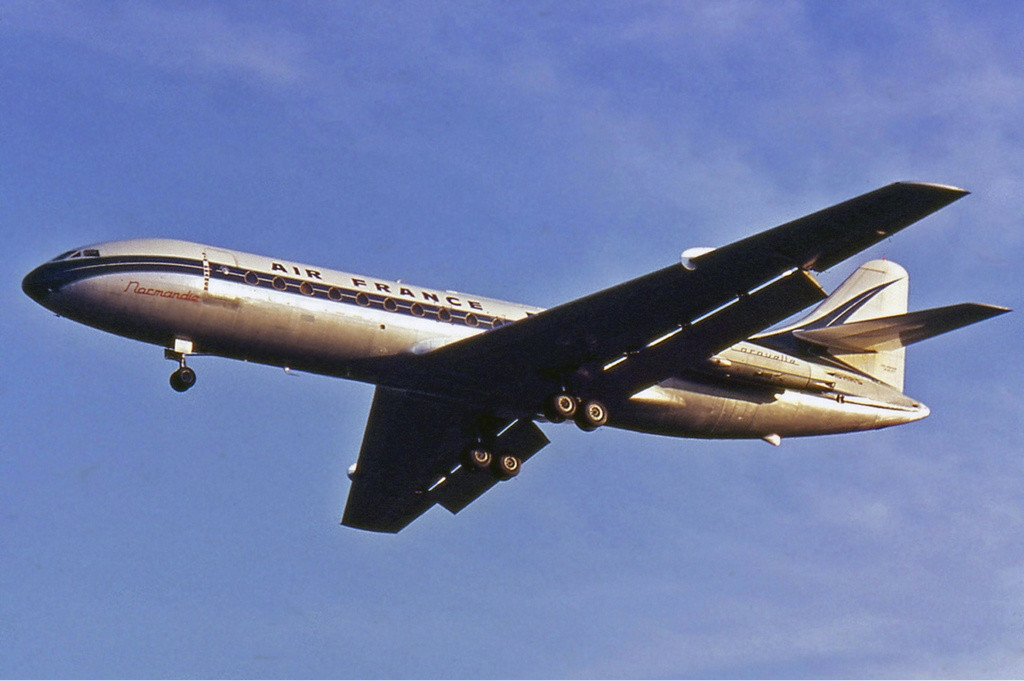
The Sud Aviation Caravelle short-haul jet airliner was the first regional jet introduced in 1959

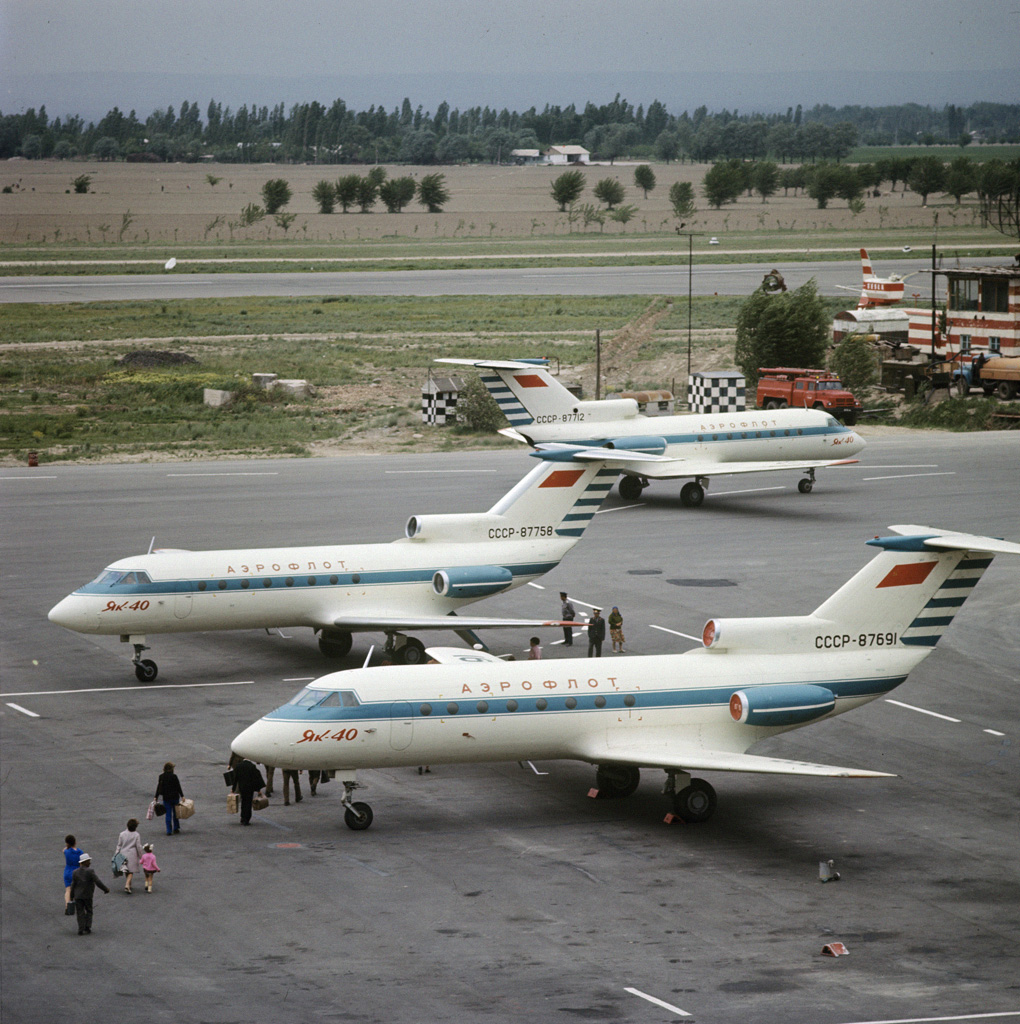
The Yakovlev Yak-40 was introduced in 1968

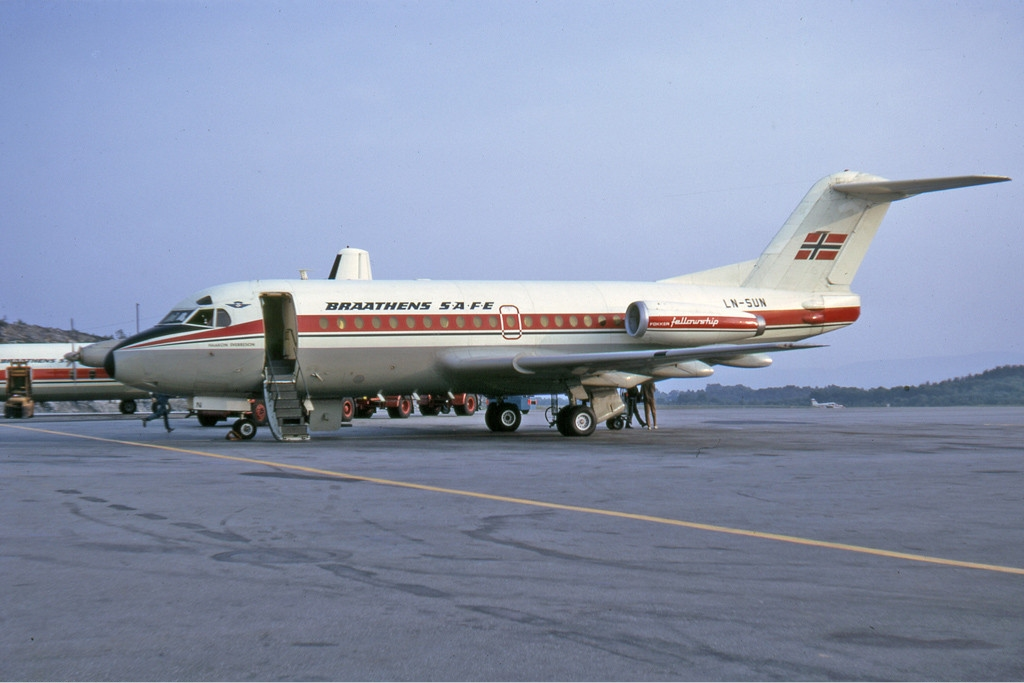
The Fokker F-28 was introduced in 1969 and was followed by the stretched Fokker 100 in 1988 and its Fokker 70 shrink in 1994.

A regional jet (RJ) is a jet-powered regional airliner usually defined by having fewer than 100 seats. The first aircraft considered part of this category was the Sud-Aviation Caravelle in 1959, followed by Douglas DC-9, BAC One-Eleven, Yakovlev Yak-40, Fokker F28, and BAe 146. The early versions of the Boeing 737 also competed in this category. The 1990s saw the emergence of the Canadair Regional Jet and Embraer Regional Jet families, followed by the larger Embraer E-Jet and multiple competing projects. These new developments brought heavy competition into the space, ultimately resulting in the bankruptcy of Fokker in 1996 and departure of BAE Systems from the RJ market in 2001.

Market consolidation continued as Bombardier Aviation sold its airliner programs between 2017 and 2019, leaving Embraer as the sole large independent regional jet manufacturer with its Embraer E-Jet E2 family. Comac of China introduced the C909 (at the time ARJ21) jet to fill China's missing regional industry since the retirement of the DC-9. Antonov of Ukraine was producing the Antonov An-148 until a fatal crash, Saratov Airlines Flight 703, and the Russian invasion of Ukraine halted its production. Lastly Sukhoi of Russia created the Sukhoi Superjet 100, although production has slowed down since the war in Ukraine.

== Definition ==
Regional Jet is a term in industry jargon and not a regulatory category. Embry–Riddle Aeronautical University defines the regional jet as up to 100 seats in capacity. This is also the limit capacity for two flight attendants in both the US and Europe.

FlightGlobal sort the 66- to 146-seat Embraer E-Jet/E2 as a regional aircraft, but the 116- to 141-seat Airbus A220 (ex Bombardier CSeries) as a mainline airliner. Boeing defines regional jets as below 90 seats.

Regional Jet is used in the name of multiple airliners:

- the 50-seat Canadair Regional Jet CRJ-100/200 was introduced in 1992 and evolved from 2001 in the 70- to 100-seat CRJ700/900/1000;
- the 70- to 112-seat BAe 146 was renamed as the Avro Regional Jet in 1993;
- the 34- to 50-seat Embraer Regional Jet ERJ-135/140/145 entered service in 1996;
- the later 66- to 124-seat Embraer E-Jet, introduced in 2004, still carries the ERJ type certificate name;
- the 98-seat Sukhoi Superjet 100, introduced in 2011, was initially known as the Russian Regional Jet, and is still called RRJ-95 in its type certificate;
- the 78- to 98-seat Comac ARJ21, introduced in 2016, stands for Advanced Regional Jet;
- the 78- to 92-seat Mitsubishi SpaceJet, marketed as the Mitsubishi Regional Jet before 2019

The scope clauses, limiting the aircraft size and number in US regional airlines, are often a design point for regional jets. Since 2012, American Airlines, Delta Air Lines and United Airlines cap their regional airlines' jets at 76 seats and maximum take-off weight at 86,000 lb (39 t).

For an EASA assessment of aircraft noise, regional jets were defined by ICAO/CAEP experts as 30–50 t (66,000–110,000 lb) MTOW aircraft.

These aircraft are widely used by commuter airlines such as SkyWest and American Eagle. The low rate of fuel consumption, which translates to low cost of operation, makes regional jets ideal for use as commuter aircraft or to connect lower traffic airports to large or medium hub airports. Regional jets are heavily used in the US Essential Air Service program.

== History ==
=== 1960s–1970s ===
The Sud Aviation Caravelle (80 to 140 seats), introduced in 1959 and ordered by many European flag carriers, was the first purpose-built short-haul jetliner. It was a twin turbojet design for inter-European routes. The Caravelle used the forward fuselage nose section of the de Havilland Comet, the first commercial jetliner, not effective for continental-European flights. The BAC One-Eleven (89 to 119 seats) was then introduced in 1965.

In 1968, Aeroflot introduced the 32-seat Yakovlev Yak-40 and the 65- to 85-seat Fokker F28 Fellowship was introduced in 1969. In 1975, the 40- to 44-seat VFW-Fokker 614 saw service entry with its distinctive overwing engines, 19 were built. Some business jets like the British Aerospace 125 (first delivery: 1964) and Dassault Falcon 20 (1965) were operated by small airlines from the 1960s, and the small Aerospatiale Corvette (1974) was used as a regional airliner from the 1970s.

=== 1980s ===
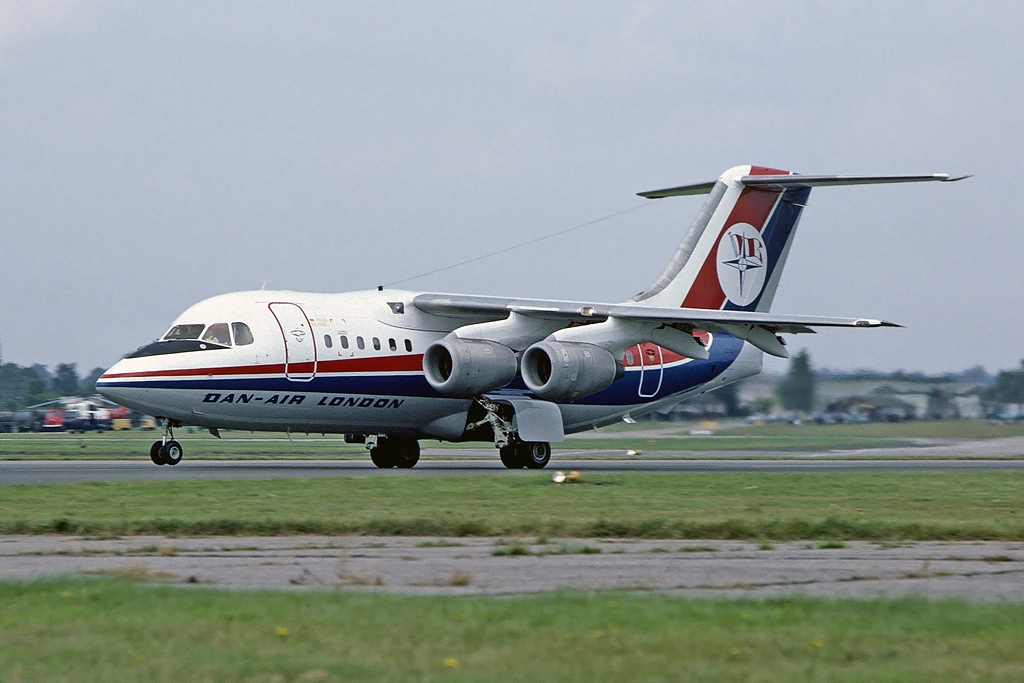
The Bae 146 started service in May 1983

In 1978, the US Airline Deregulation Act led to route liberalization, favouring small airliners demand. US passengers were disappointed by these, lacking aircraft lavatories or flight attendants of larger jet aircraft. As feeder routes grew, regional airlines replaced these small aircraft with larger turboprop airliners to feed larger airline hubs. These medium airliners were then supplanted by faster, longer range, regional jets like the first Bombardier CRJ100/200. Early small jets had higher operating costs than turboprops on short routes. The gap narrowed with better turbofans, and closed with the higher utilization due to higher speeds.

In 1983 British Aerospace introduced its BAe 146 short-range jet, produced in three sizes between 70 and 112 seats: the -100, -200, and the largest -300, later renamed the Avro Regional Jet. Low aircraft noise and short takeoffs were suited to city-center to city-center service, a small market niche, like the de Havilland Canada Dash 7, but four engines led to higher maintenance costs than twin-engine designs and BAe did not produce a lower operating cost twin-engine design, unlike the Dash 8.

In 1988, the 97- to 122-seat Fokker 100, a stretched F28, was introduced, followed by the shorter, 72– to 85-seat Fokker 70 in 1994.

=== 1990s ===
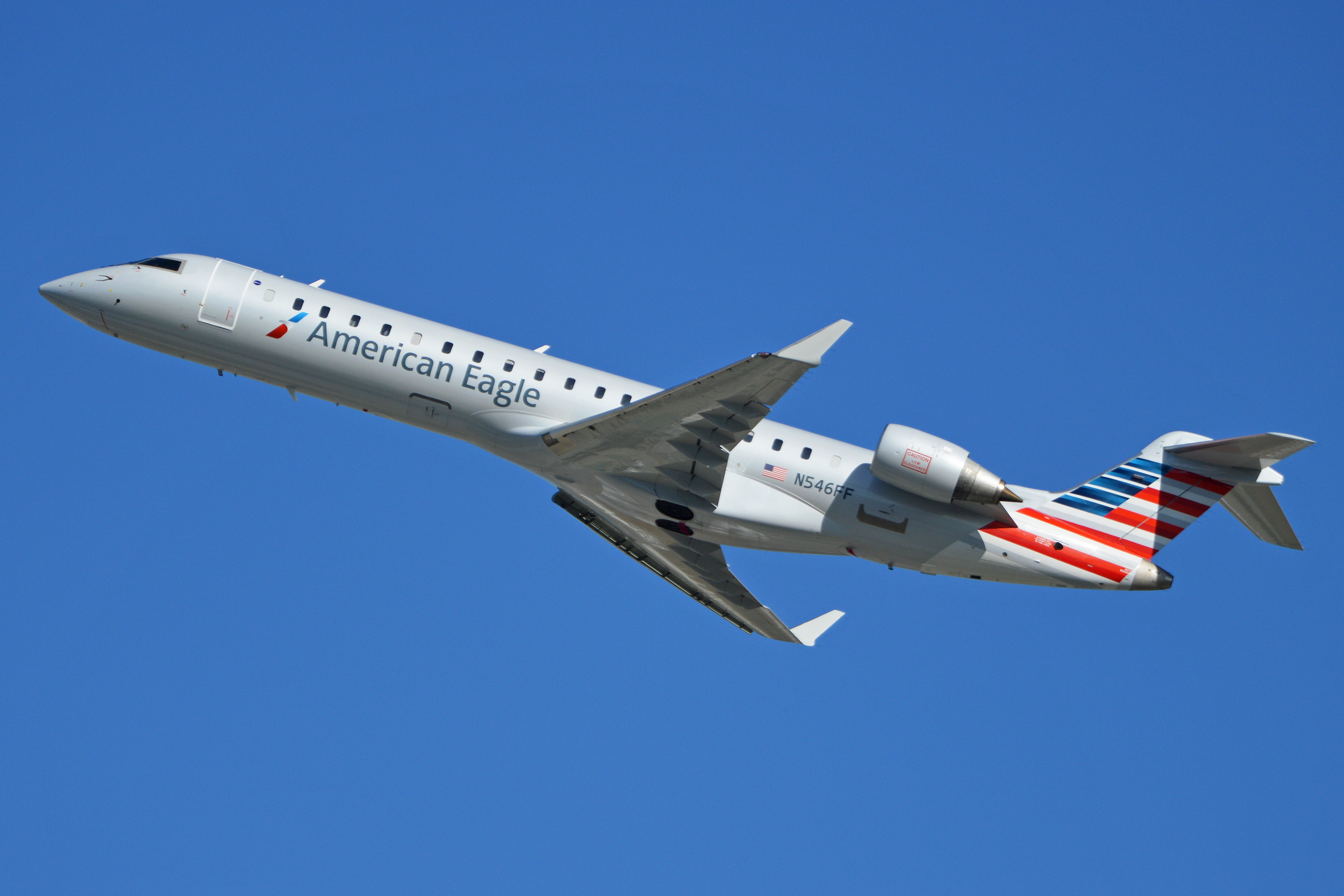
The Canadair Regional Jet family was introduced in 1992 with the Bombardier CRJ-100. In total 1945 aircraft were built until the end of production in 2020

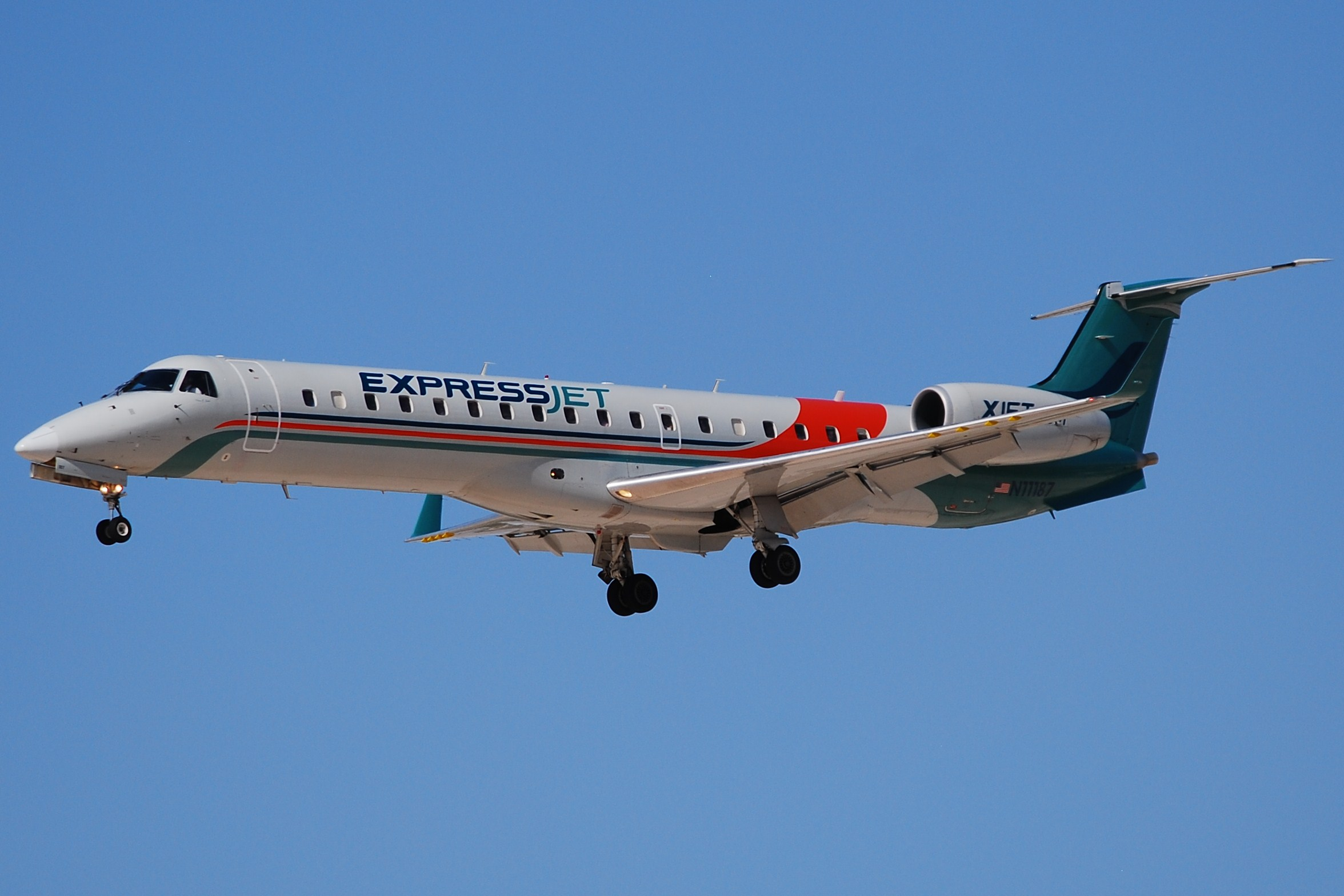
The Embraer ERJ family began in April 1997

Low fuel prices drove the development of the regional jet: in the 1990s oil prices were around $10–20 per barrel. Turboprop manufacturers wanted to develop their portfolio. Canadair's purchase by Bombardier in 1986 enabled a 50-seat stretched development of its Challenger business jet, green-lighted by then chief executive Laurent Beaudoin in March 1989. The first Bombardier four-abreast Canadair Regional Jet was delivered in October 1992 to Lufthansa CityLine.

Embraer then developed the 50-seat three-abreast ERJ 145 from the EMB-120 Brasilia turboprop, which was introduced in December 1996. They replaced the turboprops thanks to their better perceived image and larger range. On small-capacity long routes, they could offer a better service by increasing frequencies at a smaller capacity and could replace mainline jet airliners like McDonnell Douglas DC-9s and Boeing 737s. They can be used for direct airport-to-airport flights, to the detriment of the hub-and-spoke model.

Since 1999, the Fairchild Dornier 328JET was also competing but the type did not enter large scale production as Fairchild Dornier went bankrupt in 2002, also ending the larger Fairchild Dornier 728 family development. The CRJ/ERJ also resulted in the end of the BAe 146 line.

The CRJ and ERJ success also played a minor part in the failure of Fokker, whose Fokker 100 found itself squeezed on both sides by new models of the Boeing 737 and Airbus A319 on the "large" side and the RJs on the "small side". On 5 February 1996, Bombardier started looking at a takeover of a struggling Fokker, producer of the Fokker 100 100-seater. After evaluating Fokker's opportunities and challenges, Bombardier dropped the prospect on 27 February. Bombardier was feeling that the 100-seat market was already saturated by designs like the A319, a decision that looked foolish with the successful introduction of the E-Jets.

=== 2000s ===
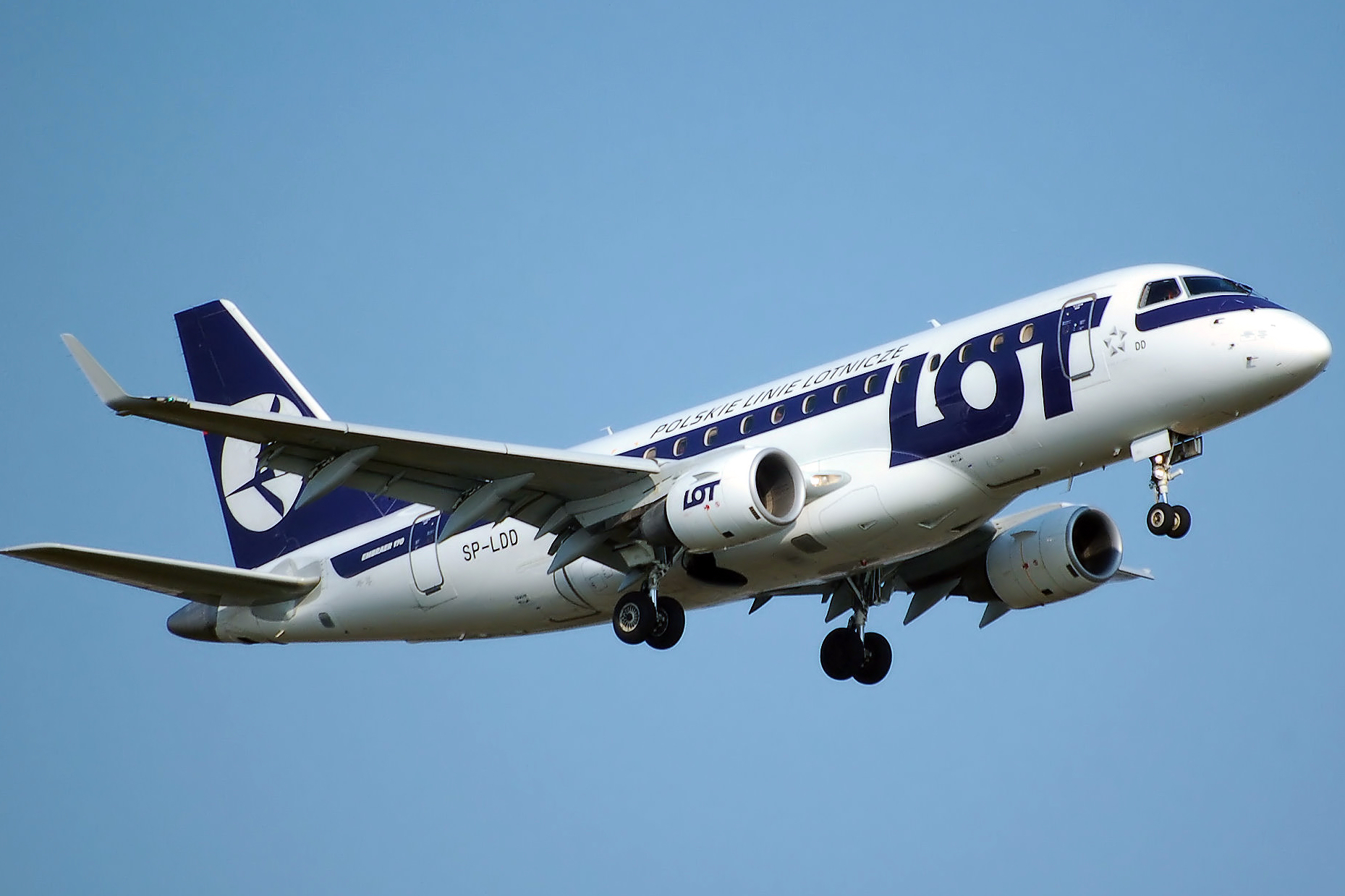
The Embraer E-Jet family was introduced in 2004

The share of US domestic passengers flying in 32- to 100-seat regional jets grew to one-third from 2000 to 2005, as network carriers subcontracted low-volume routes to cheaper commuter airlines with smaller planes. Amid regional jet usage saturation, bankruptcy of regional airlines and shrinking of Delta Air Lines and Northwest Airlines, cramped 50-seaters were evolving into more spacious 70- to 100-seaters, limited by union rules.

In late 2005, Bombardier suspended its CRJ-200 production line.

Between 2000 through 2006, 385 large planes were grounded while 1,029 regional jets were added. By June 2007, nearly a third of US domestic flights on major airlines were late, as using more smaller jets led to more crowded skies and runways in an already saturated system.

US major carriers high pilots' wages led them to subcontract flights to regional airlines with lower labor costs. Pilot unions then demanded to regulate subcontracted aircraft size to a 50 seats maximum scope clause. In turn, large routes were served by sub-optimal 50-seat jets which accelerated demand for those types in North America. Embraer envisioned a market for more than 500 aircraft and planned to produce up to 80 a year, but at peak delivered 157 ERJs in 2000 while Bombardier delivered 155 CRJs in 2003.

After 9/11, high fuel prices returned and jets had to grow to keep seat-mile costs down. Airlines renegotiated scope clause to limit jets to 70 seats as the market consolidated. Larger aircraft came back on regional routes for their efficiency, and on shorter routes turboprops were not much slower for a lower cost, reversing the 1990s trend. Bombardier delivered its last 50-seat CRJ in 2006 and Embraer delivered its last ERJ in 2011.

Bombardier switched to its lengthened 70- to 100-seat CRJ700/900/1000, while Embraer launched the four-abreast E-Jet series 170/175/190/195. 50-seat jet demand is lower with high fuel prices, and this reflects on their lower market value. A majority of them will be scrapped.

Bombardier and Embraer have started a series of lawsuits over export taxes and subsidies.

Although not as economical as the turboprop, by flying directly to and from smaller airports, regional jets reduced the need for low-cost regional airliners.

The 68- to 99-seat Antonov An-148, designed and produced by Antonov in Ukraine, made its maiden flight on 17 December 2004 after a development started in the 1990s. It was certified on 26 February 2007 and introduced in 2009. The stretched An-158 can seat 99 passengers.

=== 2010s ===
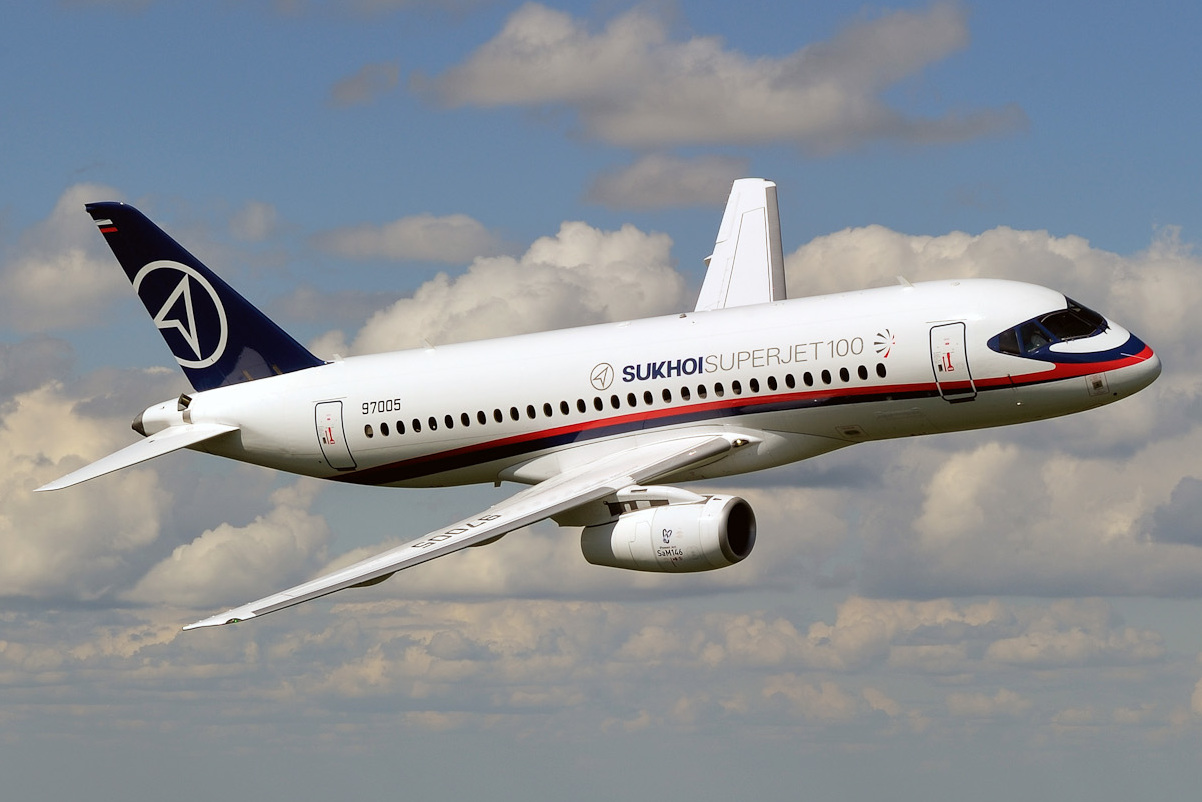
The Sukhoi Superjet 100 was introduced in 2011

United Aircraft Corporation subsidiary Sukhoi developed the Superjet 100, it made its maiden flight on 19 May 2008 and was introduced in April 2011 with Armavia. It typically seats 98 passengers and is powered by 2 PowerJet SaM146 turbofans from a Safran/NPO Saturn joint venture.

Many CRJ100/200 were retired since 2003 and in 2013 the first Embraer ERJ were disassembled: 50-seaters' value was dwindling as US carriers were dropping them. The ERJ retirements could be exacerbated because Rolls-Royce plc restricts parts choice, making engine maintenance more expensive, but its TotalCare agreements provide cost predictability.

The Comac ARJ21 is a 78- to 90-seat jet manufactured by the Chinese state-owned aerospace company Comac. Development began in March 2002, the first prototype was rolled out on 21 December 2007, and made its maiden flight on 28 November 2008. It received its CAAC Type Certification on 30 December 2014 and was introduced on 28 June 2016 by Chengdu Airlines. Resembling the McDonnell Douglas MD-80/MD-90 produced under licence in China, it features a 25° swept, supercritical wing designed by Antonov and twin rear-mounted General Electric CF34 engines.

Bombardier Aerospace developed the 108- to 160-seat CSeries powered by two Pratt & Whitney PW1000G geared turbofans. The smaller CS100 entered service in July 2016 with Swiss Global Air Lines and the larger CS300 entered service with airBaltic in December. After the April 2016 CSeries dumping petition by Boeing, Airbus acquired a 50.01% majority stake in the program in October 2017 and renamed it the A220-100/300 in July 2018.

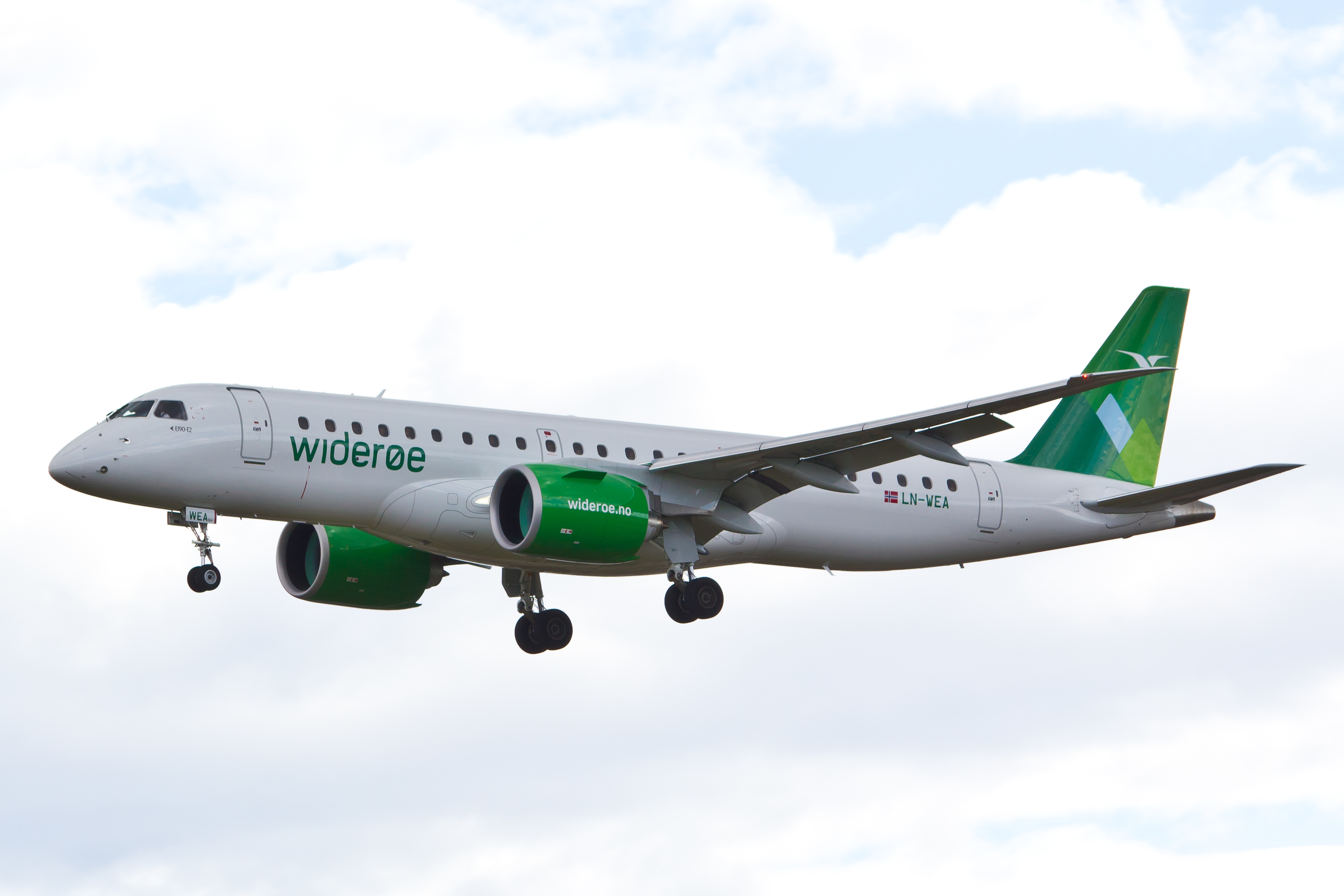
The Embraer E190-E2 was introduced in 2018

In 2017, Embraer started calling large, almost narrowbody regional jets "crossover" jets, for the Embraer E-Jet E2 and the CSeries. While those rival the A320neo, the smaller MRJ and SSJ100 could be stretched. They are often the largest airliners which can access city airports like London City Airport, benefiting from their longer range and lower fuel burn to open new markets while making lower noise for better local community acceptance.

In 2019, after attempting to renegotiate scope clauses, United Airlines ultimately decided to order fifty CRJs for its regional affiliates; the aircraft will be sourced from existing CRJ700 airframes and reconfigured with 50 seats in 3 classes. Bombardier will recertify the aircraft as the CRJ550 model, with a lower MTOW to comply with the scope clauses, and hopes to sell this new configuration to replace up to 700 existing 50-seaters with US regional airlines.

By August 2019, there were 1,100 50-seat jets operated worldwide including 700 in the US, many more than 20 years old. SkyWest wants to replace 150 of its 200 ageing Bombardier CRJ200s and ERJs and while many have logged 30,000 cycles, their life may be extended to 60,000 cycles for 10-15 more years of service. SkyWest asked Bombardier, Embraer and Mitsubishi Aircraft to develop a new aircraft but the market is regulated by scope clauses.

The Mitsubishi SpaceJet (ex MRJ), seating 70–90 passengers and manufactured by Mitsubishi Aircraft Corporation, made its first flight on 11 November 2015. After several delays, the program was canceled in February 2023. After Bombardier Aviation divested its CSeries and Dash 8 programmes, it sold the CRJ programme to Mitsubishi Heavy Industries, in a deal that closed on 1 June 2020.

== Operations ==
=== Costs ===
A smaller airplane is more costly per seat mile than a larger plane, but it mostly depends on the airline: in 2005, Bombardier was estimating regional jet costs at 9 to 10 US cents per seat mile while flying a Boeing 737 costs less than 8 cents per seat mile at Southwest Airlines but 15 cents at Continental Airlines.

=== Routes ===
While designed primarily for medium stage lengths, regional jets may now be found supplementing major trunk routes alongside traditional larger jet aircraft. RJs allow airlines to open new "long, thin" routings with jet equipment which heretofore did not exist, such as Atlanta to Monterrey, Nuevo León. RJs have also meant a return of jet service to cities where full-size jet service had departed over a decade ago, such as Macon, Georgia, and Brownsville, Texas.

The idea that regional jets would provide point-to-point service and bypass the hub-and-spoke system is debated. As of January 2003, 90% of all regional jet flights in the United States had a hub or major airport at one end of that flight, and this number has been gradually increasing since 1995. However an International Center for Air Transportation Report in 2004 noted that regional jets were no longer used solely for hub feeder operations. As such they filled a gap in the market by flying on longer routes than turboprops, but shorter than the narrow body jets.

== Models ==
Model	Seats	Seats /Row	Intro.	Prod. end	Built	State
Sud Aviation Caravelle	80–140	5	1959	1972	282	France
Yakovlev Yak-40	32	4	1968	1981	1011	USSR
Fokker F28 Fellowship	55–70	5	1969	1987	241	Netherlands
VFW-Fokker 614	40–44	4	1975	1977	19	Germany
Yakovlev Yak-42	120	6	1977	2003	187	USSR, Russia
BAe 146/Avro RJ	70–112	5	1983	2001	394	UK
Fokker 100	97–122	5	1988	1997	283	Netherlands
Bombardier CRJ100/200	50	4	1992	2006	1021	Canada
Fokker 70	72–85	5	1994	1997	48	Netherlands
Embraer ERJ family	37–50	3	1997	2020	1231	Brazil
Fairchild Dornier 328JET	30–33	3	1999	2004	110	Germany
Bombardier CRJ700/900/1000	66–104	4	2001	2020	924	Canada
Embraer E-Jet family	66–124	4	2004	in prod.	1750	Brazil
Antonov An-148	68–99	5	2009	2015	44	Ukraine
Sukhoi Superjet 100	87–108	5	2011	suspended in 2022 restart planned	236	Russia
Comac C909	78–105	5	2016	in prod.	210	China
Embraer E-Jet E2 family	80–146	4	2018	in prod.	203	Brazil
Mitsubishi SpaceJet	69–92	4	canceled	canceled	7	Japan

=== Fleet ===
Aircraft in Service [Backlog]
Year	2006	2007	2008	2009	2010	2011	2012	2013	2014	2015	2016	2018
E-Jet	167	252	390	537 [295]	631 [245]	723 [248]	835	917 [246]	1002 [249]	1102	1146	1349 [286]
CRJ700	260	373	441	497 [116]	545 [73]	580 [61]	592	600 [89]	649 [87]	696	751	777 [54]
CRJ100/200	938	954	950	925	923	824	788	723	648	563	560	498
ERJ	848	854	859	841	776	763	738	722	695	620	553	505
F100/F70	272	273	268	272	256	228	201	200	183	174	154	132
BAE146	310	284	291	284	250	208	183	176	172	160	152	118
SSJ100				[122]	[137]	2 [165]	9	13 [206]	28 [242]	50	63	114 [27]
328JET		70	68	59	54	38	17	13	11	14	21	11
An-148	2	2	2	2 [49]	5 [67]	8	11	16	14 [17]	13	13	7 [1]
C909				[55]	[87]	[189]		[252]	[306]		2	5 [103]
Spacejet				[65]	[15]	[15]		[165]	[223]		[203]	

=== Aircraft prices ===
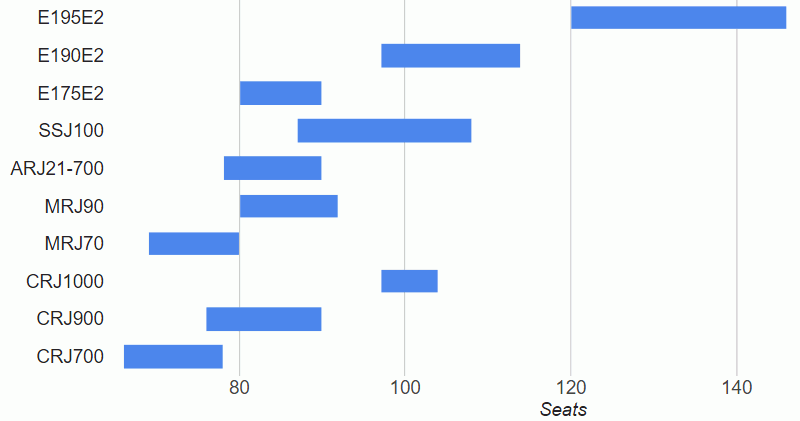
Graphical comparison between aircraft, based on the number of seats.

May 2016 market prices
Aircraft	List ($m)	Mkt Value ($m)	Discount	Seats	Mkt/Seat
E195	52.7	34.8	34%	106	328302
E190	49.8	33.1	34%	94	352128
E175	45.0	29.4	35%	78	376923
CRJ1000	49.0	25.5	43%	97	262887
SSJ100-95	35.0	25.3	28%	87	290805
CRJ900	46.0	25.0	46%	76	328947

== See also ==
- List of regional airliners
- List of aircraft
- Regional airliner
