= Aircraft maintenance checks =

Periodic scheduled inspection performed on aircraft to keep it airworthy

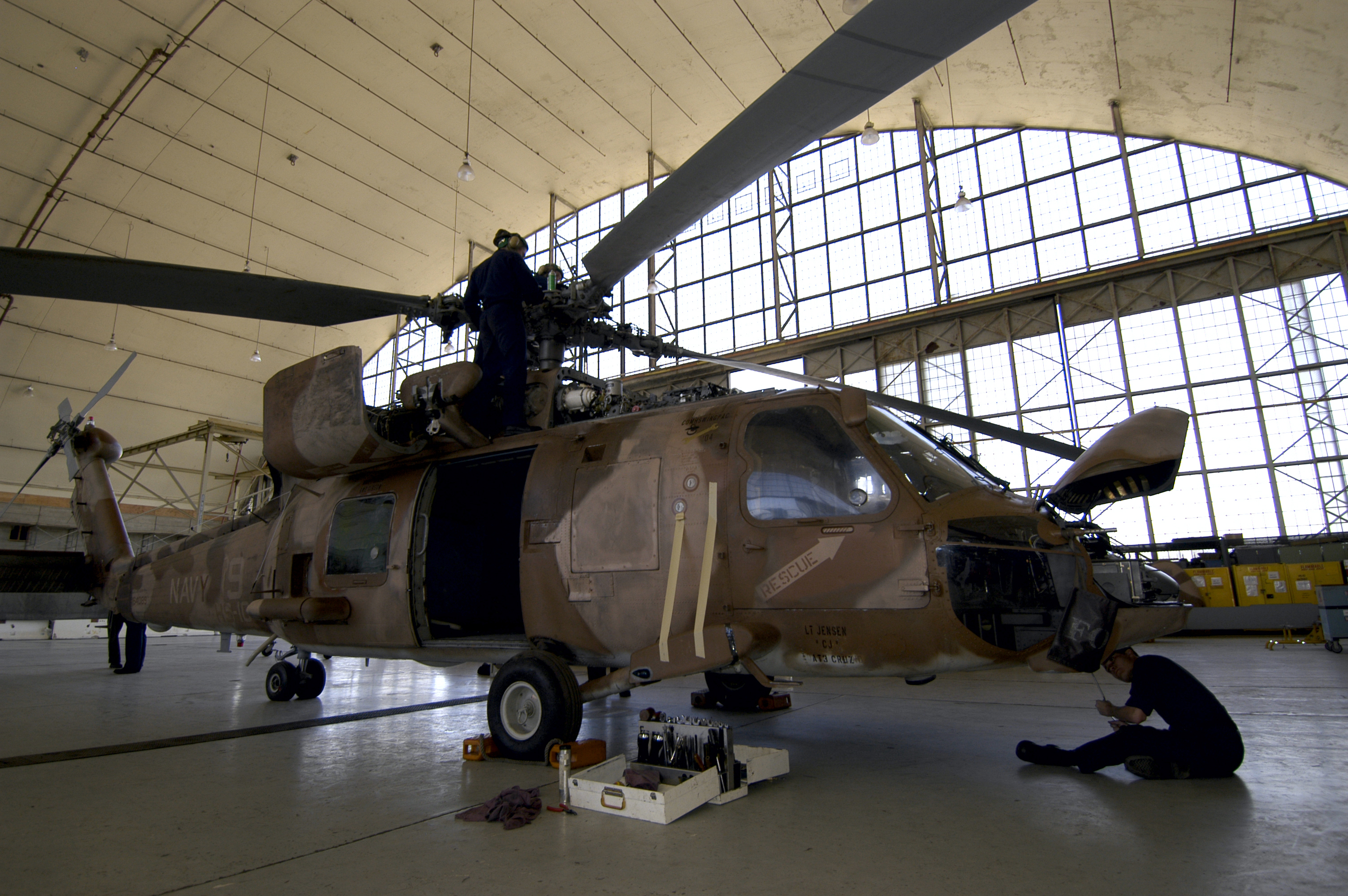
A United States Navy SH-60F Seahawk helicopter undergoing routine maintenance in 2005

Aircraft maintenance checks are periodic inspections that have to be done on all commercial and civil aircraft after a certain amount of time or usage. Military aircraft normally follow specific maintenance programmes which may, or may not, be similar to those of commercial and civil operators.

== Commercial aviation ==
Airlines and other commercial operators of large, or turbine-powered, aircraft follow a continuous inspection program approved by the Federal Aviation Administration (FAA) in the United States, or by other airworthiness authorities such as the Transport Canada Civil Aviation Directorate (TCCA), or the European Aviation Safety Agency (EASA). Each operator prepares a Continuous Airworthiness Maintenance Program (CAMP) under its Operations Specifications or "OpSpecs". The CAMP includes both routine and detailed inspections.

=== Maintenance Review Board ===
International approach (originated by the United States FAA) is to establish initial aircraft maintenance requirements for each aircraft type in a Maintenance Review Board Report (MRBR). The MRBR is based on the analysis performed using ATA "MSG-3 Operator/Manufacturer Scheduled Maintenance Development" document (MSG-3 is for Maintenance Steering Group – 3rd Task Force). The MRBR is an approved set of aircraft initial maintenance requirements as prescribed by the Appendix H to para. 25.1529 of 14 CFR part 25. Modern aircraft with MSG-3-derived maintenance programs employ usage parameters — such as flight hours, calendar time, or flight cycles — for each required maintenance task included in the MRBR aimed to avoid and/or timely correct certain failures of an aircraft systems and parts thereof. This allows for more flexibility in the scheduling of maintenance to minimize aircraft downtime.

=== ABC check system ===
Airlines and airworthiness authorities casually refer to the detailed inspections as "checks", commonly one of the following: A check, B check, C check, or D check. A and B checks are lighter checks, while C and D are considered heavier checks. Aircraft operators may perform some work at their own facilities, but often checks, and especially the heavier checks, take place at maintenance, repair and overhaul (MRO) company sites.

==== A check ====
The A check is performed approximately every 400 to 600 flight hours, or every 200 to 300 flights, depending on aircraft type. It needs about 50 to 70 man-hours, and is usually performed in an airport hangar. The A check takes a minimum of 10 hours. Often airlines schedule these checks to occur overnight to minimize the impact of the plane being taken out of service. The actual occurrence of this check varies by aircraft type, the flight cycle count, or the number of hours flown since the last check. The occurrence can be delayed by the airline if certain predetermined conditions are met.

==== B check ====
The B check is performed approximately every 6 to 8 months and typically takes 160 to 180 man-hours, depending on the aircraft. It is usually completed within 1 to 3 days in an airport hangar. However, modern aircraft no longer require stand-alone B checks. Instead, the necessary inspections and maintenance tasks have been integrated into successive A checks over the 6- to 8-month cycle, reducing aircraft downtime.

==== C check ====
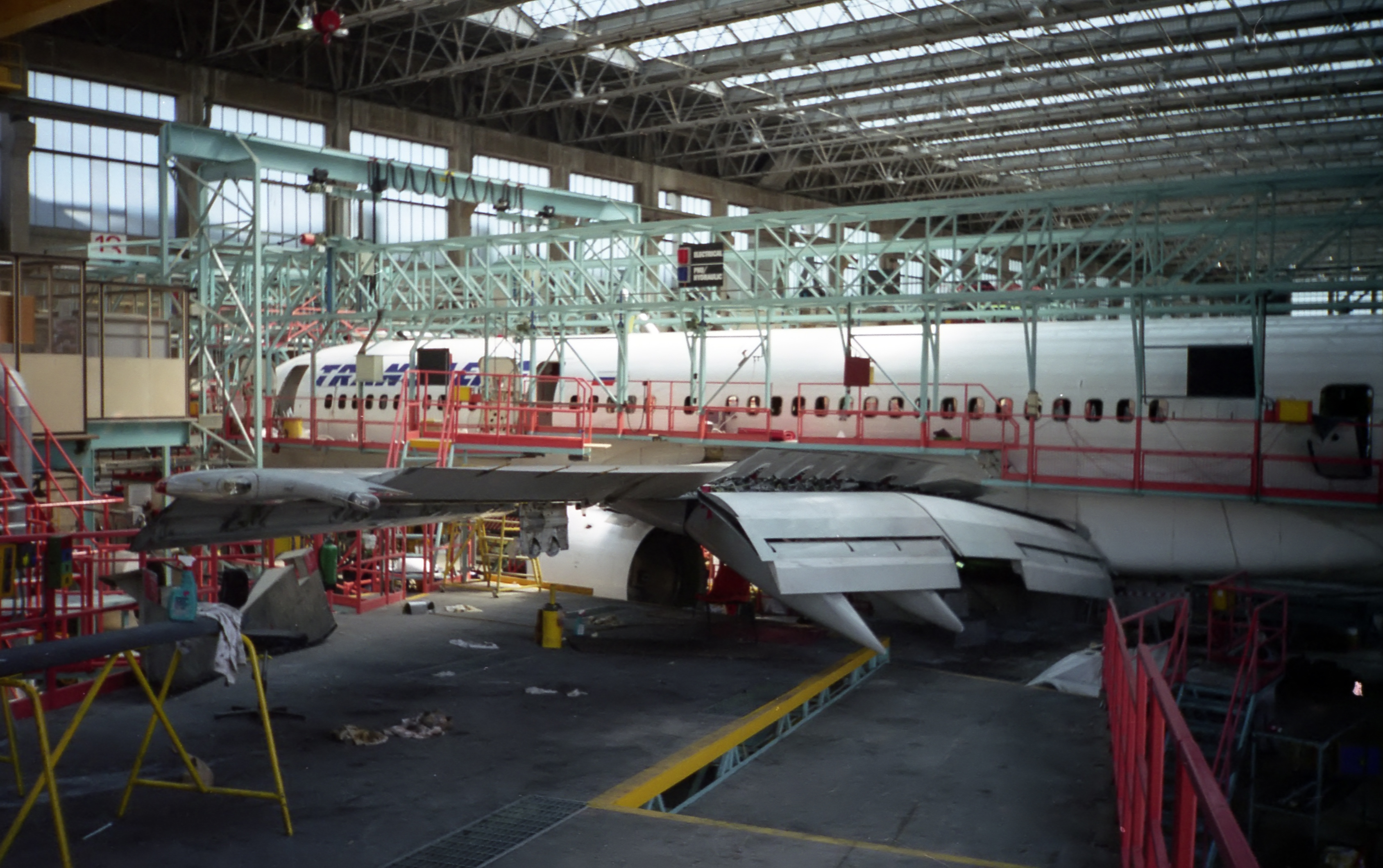
Transaero Boeing 757 undergoing C-check at the British Airways Engineering maintenance base, Heathrow (1996)

The C check is performed approximately every 20 to 24 months, after a specific number of actual flight hours, or as defined by the manufacturer. This maintenance check is much more extensive than the B check, requiring a large majority of the aircraft's components to be inspected. This check puts the aircraft out of service for 1 to 4 weeks. The aircraft must not leave the maintenance site until it is completed. It also requires more space than A and B checks, therefore, it is usually carried out in a hangar at a maintenance base. The effort needed to complete a C check is up to 6,000 man-hours.

==== 3C check ====
Some authorities use a type of check, known as a 3C check or Intermediate Layover (IL), which typically includes light structural maintenance, including checks for corrosion, or on specific high-load parts of the airframe. The 3C check may also be used as the opportunity for cabin upgrades, e.g. new seats, entertainment systems, carpeting. This shortens the time the aircraft is out of service, by performing two distinct tasks simultaneously. As component reliability has improved, some MROs now spread the workload across several C checks, or incorporate this 3C check into D checks instead.

==== D check ====
The D check, sometimes known as a "heavy maintenance visit" (HMV), is by far the most comprehensive and demanding check for an airplane. This check occurs approximately every 6 to 10 years. It is a check that more or less takes the entire airplane apart for inspection and overhaul. Even the paint may need to be completely removed for complete inspection of the fuselage metal skin. Such a check can generally take up to 50,000 man-hours, and six months to a year to complete depending on the number of technicians involved. It also requires the most space of all maintenance checks, and as such must be performed at a suitable maintenance base. The requirements and the tremendous effort involved in this maintenance check make it by far the most expensive, with total costs for a single D check in the million-dollar range.

Because of the nature and the cost of a D check, most airlines plan D checks for their aircraft years in advance. Often, older aircraft being phased out of a particular airline's fleet are either stored or scrapped upon reaching their next D check, due to the high costs involved in comparison to the aircraft's value. On average, a commercial aircraft undergoes two or three D checks before being retired.

Manufacturers often underestimate the cost of the D check. Boeing underestimates the cost for four of its aircraft, and the expectation is that it has underestimated it for the Boeing 787-9 which in 2018 had not been in service for long enough to have been put through a D check.

All amounts in millions of United States dollars, as of 2018.

Aircraft	Estimated	Actual
Boeing 777-200ER	$2.5	$4.0
Boeing 777-300ER	$2.7	$4.5
Boeing 747-400	$4.0	$6.0
Boeing 737-800	$0.65	$1.0

=== Offshore maintenance facilities ===
As of 2015, there are 731 foreign repair shops certified by the FAA performing critical maintenance inspections and repairs for airplanes operating in the United States. This includes repair facilities performing the "heavy maintenance", D Checks, such as the Aeroman facility located in El Salvador, where one in eight mechanics are FAA certified. At a major overhaul base used by United Airlines in China, the ratio is one FAA-certified mechanic for every 31 non-certified mechanics.

== Comparison ==
Flight hours maintenance intervals
Model	A Check	C Check	D Check
Airbus A220	1,000	8,500	
Airbus A320 family	750 (or 750 cycles or 4 months)	12,000 (or 8,000 cycles or 36 months)	6/12 years
ATR 42/ATR 72	750	5,000	2/4/8 years
Bombardier CRJ700 series	800	8,000	
Bombardier Dash 8	800	8,000	
Bombardier Global 7500	850/36 months	8,500 cycles / 12 years	
Embraer E-Jet family	1,000	7,500	
Embraer E-Jet E2 family	1,000	10,000	
Mitsubishi Regional Jet	750	7,500	
Boeing 737 NG	150/600	7,500 (or 730 days)	
Boeing 767-300ER	750 (or 300 flight cycles)	6,000 (or 3,000 flight cycles or 18 months)	
Boeing 747-400/747-8	600/1,000	7,500/10,000	6 years (systems); 8/8/6 years (most structures and zonal)
