= Scope clause =

Part of contracts between pilots' unions and airlines

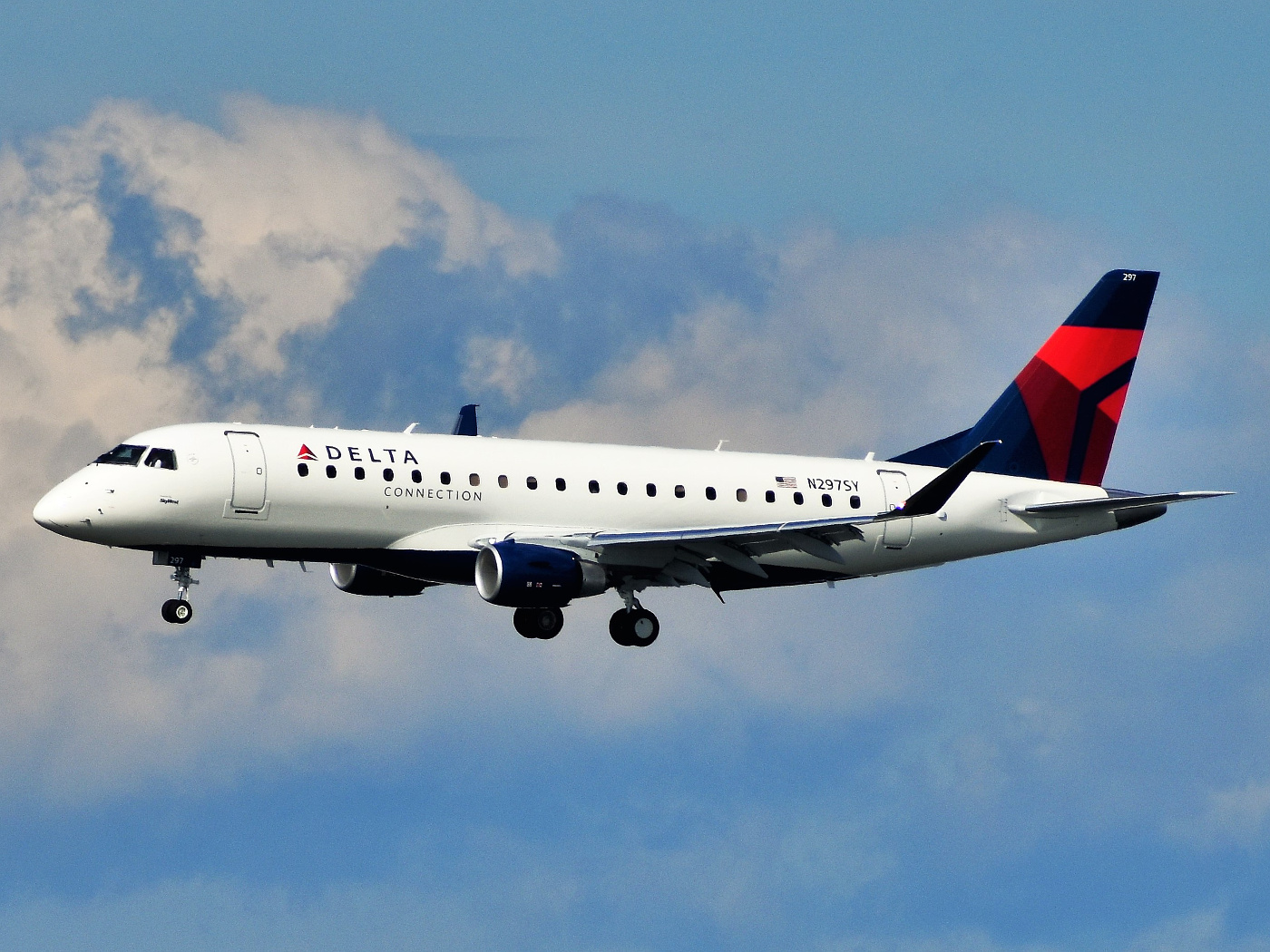
The Embraer 175 complies with the 76 seat limit

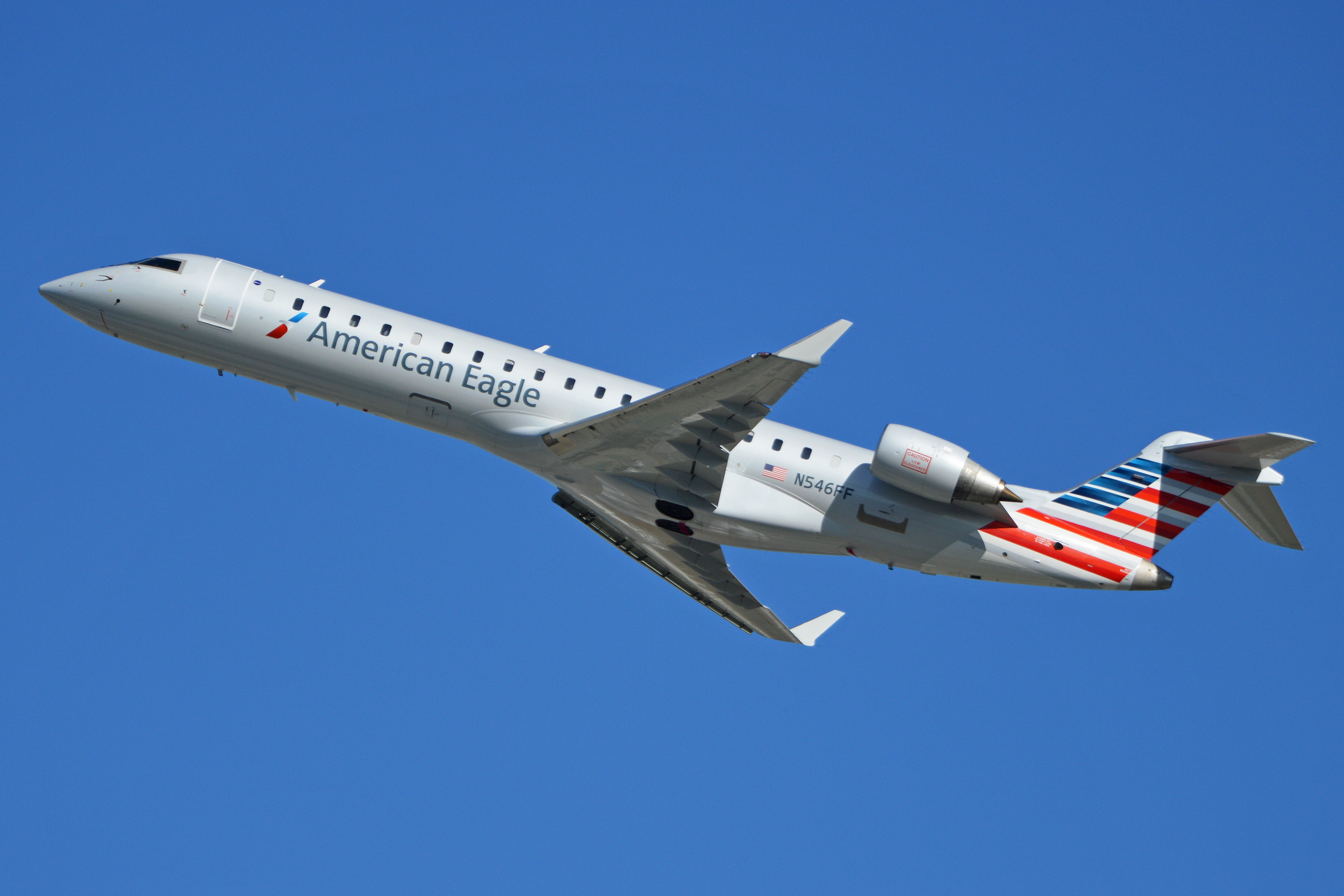
The CRJ700, also within the 76 seat limit

A scope clause is part of a contract between a major airline and the trade union of its pilots that limits the number and size of aircraft that may be flown by the airline's regional airline affiliate.

== Airlines ==
The scope clause's goal is to protect the union pilots' jobs at the major airline from being outsourced to the regional carriers by limiting the regional airlines' passenger capacity. These clauses exist primarily in the United States, Canada, and Mexico.

Scope clauses are supported as a means of saving union jobs. Major airline pilots are usually higher paid than regional pilots. Criticism of scope clauses centers on the limits they place on the regional airlines they target. Scope clauses are intended to prevent the major carriers from outsourcing routes calling for larger equipment to regional airlines, with their lower paid pilots, and thus reducing the number of more highly paid pilots at the majors.

Scope clauses place restrictions on how many and what size of aircraft a regional airline may operate. Some holding companies operate a large number of individual airlines, with each airline's fleet specifically tuned to the scope clause of that airline's contracted major carrier.

Select airline scope clauses
Carrier	Up to 50 seats	51 - 76 seats
American Airlines	No limit	Above 65 seats, a number not to exceed 40% of the mainline narrow-body fleet
Delta Air Lines	Up to 125 aircraft	Up to 102 70-seat aircraft, up to 223 76-seat aircraft (may be reduced by 35 aircraft if the flow provisions of Delta LOA #9 cease to be available at Endeavor Air)
United Airlines	Up to 90% of the United Airlines single-aisle fleet	255 aircraft between 51 and 76 seats, not to exceed 153 76-seat aircraft
Alaska Airlines	No limit	43% of the mainline aircraft total.
Hawaiian Airlines	Cannot be flown on trunk routes serviced by mainline aircraft	

Within American Airlines, regional flying between specific cities listed in contract may not exceed 1.25 percent of mainline block hours. CRJ-900 and E175 aircraft that used to fly for US Airways, and their future replacements, are grandfathered in to the seat limitation and may operate with 79 or 80 seats, respectively.

At Delta Air Lines, 85% of flying has to be less than 900 miles, and 90% of flying will be to and from hubs. For United Airlines, regional block hours must be less than mainline block hours. Mainline routes flown in last 24 months are prohibited unless United could not earn an adequate return.

== Aircraft manufacturers ==
Scope clauses have a major influence on manufacturers of regional aircraft. Manufacturers will create airplanes specifically tuned to the scope clauses of most airlines. For this reason and others, regional aircraft tend to be manufactured in families, and competing regional aircraft will often have identical seating capacity.

	Seats				
Manufacturer	44	50	70	90	100
Bombardier	CRJ440*	CRJ100/200*, CRJ550*	CRJ700*, Q400*	CRJ900*, Q400*	CRJ1000*
Embraer	ERJ140*	ERJ145*	E170*, E175	E175, E175-E2	E190/195*, E190-E2
ATR	ATR 42	ATR 42	ATR 72		
Airbus					A220-100

[*] Indicates aircraft is no longer in production

== Timeline ==
In 2012, American Airlines, Delta Air Lines and United Airlines capped their regional airlines' jets at 76 seats and a maximum take-off weight (MTOW) at 86,000 lb (39 t). Between 2013 and 2017, Embraer booked nearly 400 E175 orders in the United States, besting the CRJ900 by over 4 to 1. Delta Air Lines was reported in December 2017 to have maxed out on its 153 allowable 76-seat aircraft, and was forced to fly its 102 70-seaters. The E170 has six fewer business seats but the E175SC has 70 seats, keeping the same premium seats with 400 nmi (740 km; 460 mi) more range than the E170 or the CRJ700. SkyWest ordered 30 E175SCs for Delta to enter service in 2018. The E175SC is sold at E170 pricing, a 76-seat retrofit having to go through Embraer.

The 76 seats and 86,000 lb (39 t) MTOW limits could not be amended through negotiations until 2019 at United and 2020 at Delta and American, limiting the sales of the new Mitsubishi SpaceJet M90 and Embraer 175-E2 to the smaller M100 and E175.

United Airlines has been renegotiating its agreement with the Air Line Pilots Association (ALPA) after it became amendable on January 31, 2019. As of September 2019, "noneconomic" matters relating to pilot scheduling had been agreed and ALPA expected to start discussion of scope aspects. United is seeking to fly more aircraft in the 76-seat category, given that no manufacturers currently produce 50-seaters. ALPA wishes to tie scope discussions to United's overall fleet, including wide-body aircraft, whereas the current contract links regional restrictions only to the narrow-body fleet size. Any agreement reached with United is expected to set a standard for subsequent negotiations with Delta and American, whose pilot contracts become amendable in December 2019 and in 2020, respectively.

In February 2019, Bombardier launched the CRJ550, a 50-seat variant of its CRJ700. The reduced seating capacity and maximum takeoff weight were specifically designed to comply with scope clauses. United had been pushing to renegotiate the clauses, whereas pilots were arguing against what they see as a "flawed strategy of outsourcing". The decision to reconfigure larger existing models implies that the scope clauses remain frozen.

The Embraer 175-E2 first flew on December 12, 2019. The Mitsubishi SpaceJet program was suspended in October 2020, and then cancelled in 2023. This left the US market with the Embraer 175 as the only US scope clause compatible jet engine aircraft still in production.
