= Mitsubishi SpaceJet =

Cancelled regional jet airliner project by Mitsubishi Aircraft Corporation

SpaceJet
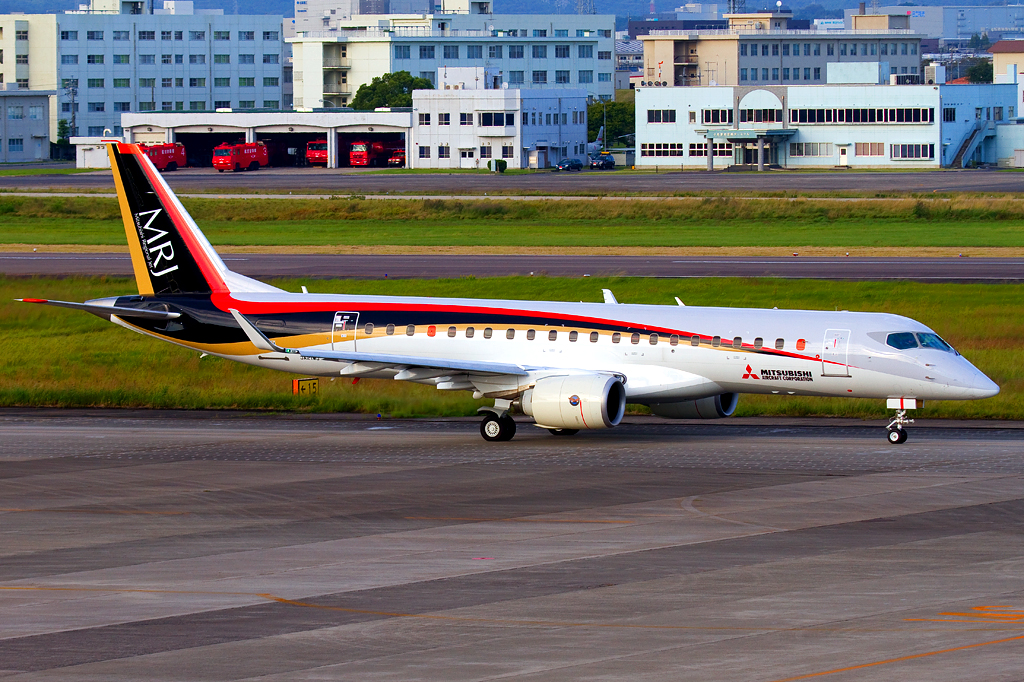
- JA21MJ, the first aircraft of its type

General information
- Type: Regional jet
- National origin: Japan
- Manufacturer: Mitsubishi Heavy Industries
- Designer: Mitsubishi Aircraft Corporation
- Status: Cancelled
- Number built: 7 MRJ90 test aircraft 1 MRJ70 test aircraft

History
- First flight: 11 November 2015

The Mitsubishi SpaceJet (Japanese: 三菱スペースジェット, originally named Mitsubishi Regional Jet) was a regional jet project by Japanese company Mitsubishi Aircraft Corporation (MAC), a Mitsubishi Heavy Industries (MHI) subsidiary, that ran from 2007 to 2023.

Work on what would become the SpaceJet can be traced back to 2003 with the backing of the Japanese government; the concept was formally presented by MHI at the Paris Air Show in June 2007 and launched one year later, at which point certification was targeted for 2012, as the first Japanese airliner since the 1962 NAMC YS-11. Extensive design changes were made during the late 2000s, which increased the weight of the airliner and led to commercial impacts. The airframe was made mainly in aluminium; some elements were composed of carbon fibre composites, such as the empennage. The low-wing twinjet was powered by underwing Pratt & Whitney PW1000Gs, and was the first program to select the geared turbofan. In June 2019, Mitsubishi rebranded the Mitsubishi Regional Jet (MRJ, Japanese: 三菱リージョナルジェット) program as the SpaceJet. The M90 (originally named MRJ90) was to seat 86 to 96, while the smaller MRJ70 was to accommodate 70 to 80 passengers. The MRJ70 was replaced by the SpaceJet M100, stretched by 1.1 m (3 ft 7 in) to better meet US scope clauses at 76 seats with premium seating. It was comparable with the Embraer E-Jet E2 family.

After a delayed development, the maiden flight of the MRJ90 took place on 11 November 2015. A total of eight test aircraft, seven MRJ90s and one MRJ70, were produced for the flight test programme. As flight testing took longer than expected, the scheduled entry into service was further pushed back. During October 2020, it was announced that the programme had been put on hold; in February 2023, the SpaceJet was officially cancelled altogether. All but one of the test aircraft have been dismantled while the sole remaining airframe has been preserved.

== Development ==
=== Launch ===
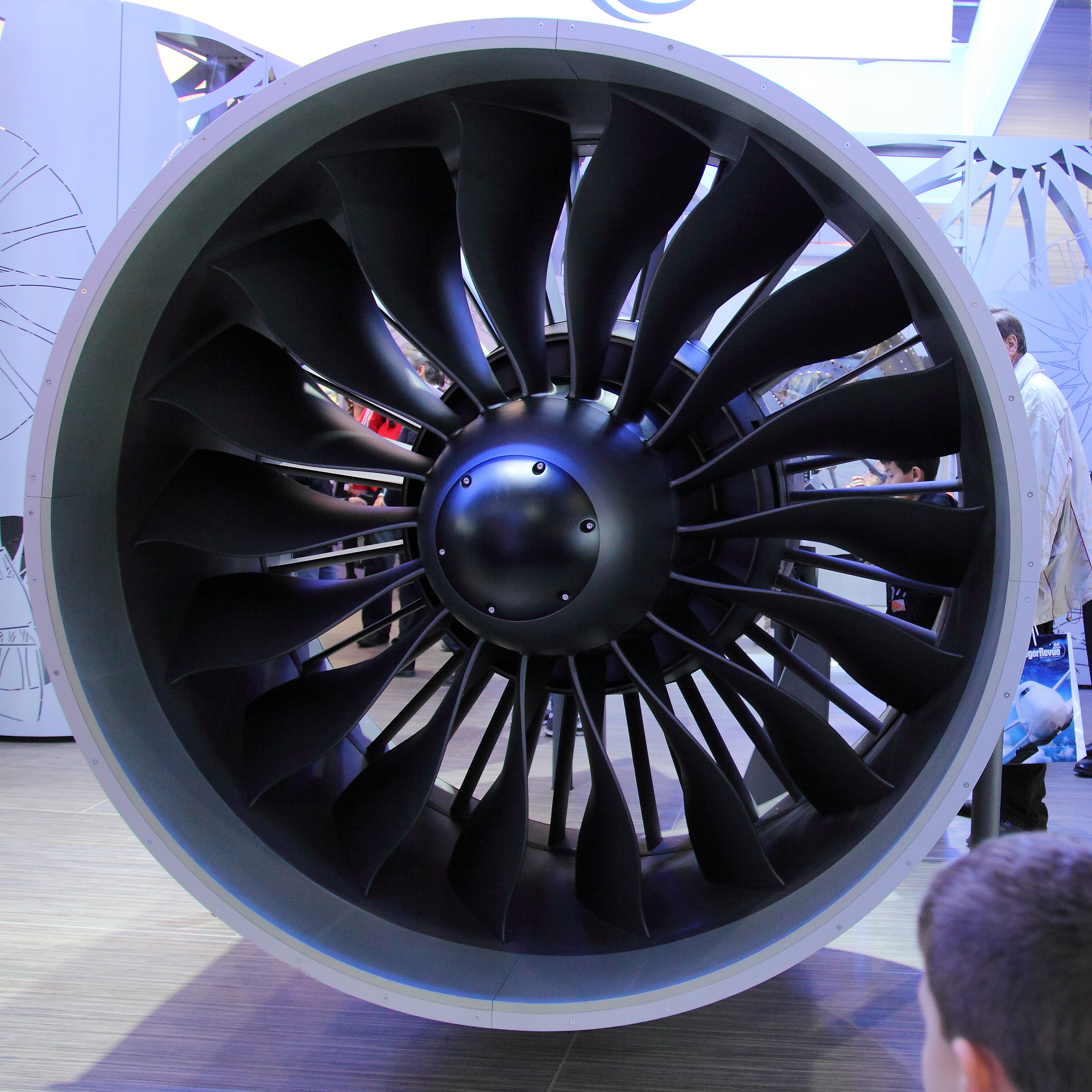
The Pratt & Whitney PW1000G geared turbofan

In 2003, the Japanese government started a five-year, ¥50 billion ($420 million) research program to study an indigenous regional jet for 30 to 90 passengers, led by Mitsubishi Heavy Industries (MHI). In 2004, MHI was reportedly focused on a 2m high by 2.8m-wide, four-seat-abreast cabin, seating 30 to 50 passengers, and was hoping to fly a prototype in 2007 and deliver the first aircraft in 2010. One year later, it switched to a larger 70-90 seat category.

During June 2007, MHI launched its concept at the Paris Air Show, showing a full-scale cabin mock-up and aiming to be the first regional jet with an all-composite airframe. At the time, certification was targeted for 2012. Mitsubishi formally offered the MRJ to airlines in October 2007 – the first Japanese airliner since the NAMC YS-11 which stopped production in 1974 – after being the first airframer to select the Pratt & Whitney PW1000G geared turbofan offering a 12 percent reduction in thrust specific fuel consumption, rated at 15,000 lbf (67 kN) thrust on the 70- to 80-seat MRJ70 and 17,000 lb thrust (75.7 kN) on the 86- to 96-seat MRJ90, projecting a ¥150 billion ($1.275 billion) development cost. The NAMC YS-11 of the 1960s was produced at a loss.

On 28 March 2008, MHI officially launched the Mitsubishi Regional Jet program, having secured an initial order for 25 aircraft (15 firm, 10 options) from All Nippon Airways, which was at that time targeting a 2013 introduction. Mitsubishi was targeting a 20 percent share of a 5,000 global sales forecast in the 70-90-seat bracket over 20 years. Flight testing was scheduled for late 2011 and the $1.9-billion program would have needed 300-400 sales to recoup its cost. Mitsubishi Aircraft Corporation (MAC) is a partnership between majority owner Mitsubishi Heavy Industries and minority owner Toyota with design assistance from Subaru Corporation, itself already an aerospace manufacturer. Various other companies would also be involved in the programme, including the American aerospace firm Boeing, who both performed consultancy work and was set to provide customer support.

=== Design ===
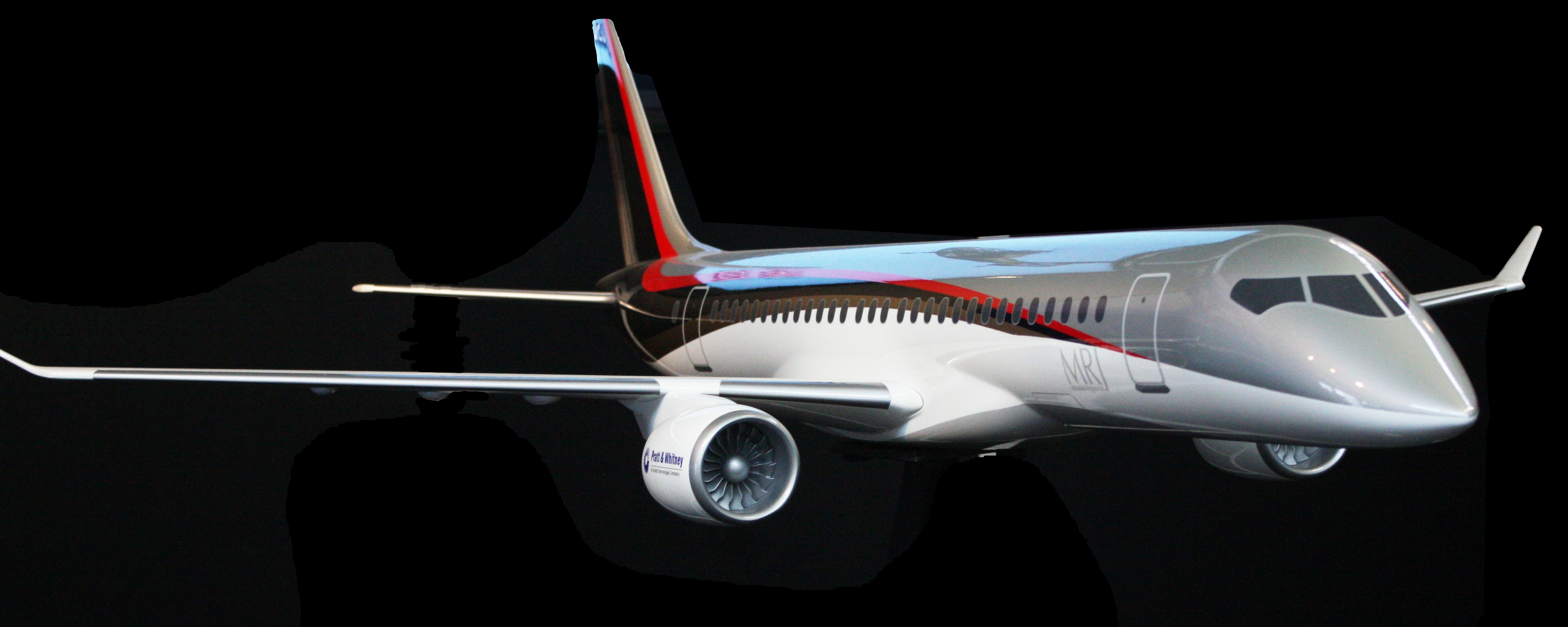
A model in 2010

In September 2009, Mitsubishi unveiled extensive design changes, using aluminium instead of carbon fibre composites for the aircraft's wings and wingbox; the remaining composite parts would make up 10-15 percent of the airframe: the empennage. The cabin height was increased by 1.5 in (4 cm) to 80.5 in (204 cm) and the fuselage height increased to 116.5 in (296 cm), giving a rounder cabin, wider and higher than its competition. The program was delayed by six months with final design frozen in mid-2010, first flight delayed to the second quarter of 2012 and deliveries to early 2014. Maintenance intervals were expected to be 750 flight hours per A Check and 7,500 flight hours per C check.

As early as December 2008, a 110-seat stretched MRJ100 was publicly under consideration; by March 2011, this option had been subject to a design study. Five years later, it was confirmed to have still been under evaluation.

As the MRJ90 MTOW of 39.6 tons was above the US regional carriers' scope clause of 39 tons, SkyWest and Trans States Holdings could have converted their MRJ90 orders for 100 and 50, respectively, to the 1.4 m shorter MRJ70: 67 percent of the 223 firm MRJ90 orders. However, the MRJ70 was to seat only 69 in two classes and attain the 76 seats scope close limit only in all-economy: Mitsubishi wanted to increase seating within its fuselage to compete with the currently compliant Embraer E-175 and Bombardier CRJ900. Mitsubishi worked on a three-class, 76-seat design, with more premium seating than the MRJ70 but still within the scope-clause 86,000 lb (39 t) MTOW, to be unveiled at the June 2019 Paris Air Show. The reworked MRJ70 was to be called the Space Jet M100 and was expected to receive its type certificate in 2022. Mitsubishi envisaged U.S. production. Program cost was expected to reach ¥800 billion by the projected 2020 debut of the SpaceJet M90.

=== Assembly ===
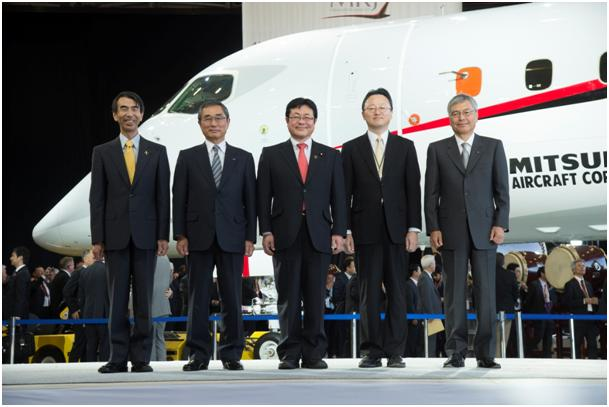
The MRJ90's rollout ceremony on 18 October 2014

On 15 September 2010, the Mitsubishi Aircraft Corporation announced that it had entered the production drawing phase and was proceeding with the manufacturing process. Assembly of the first aircraft began in April 2011 with construction of the emergency escape for the cockpit. By December 2012, MRJ90 delivery was scheduled for 2017.

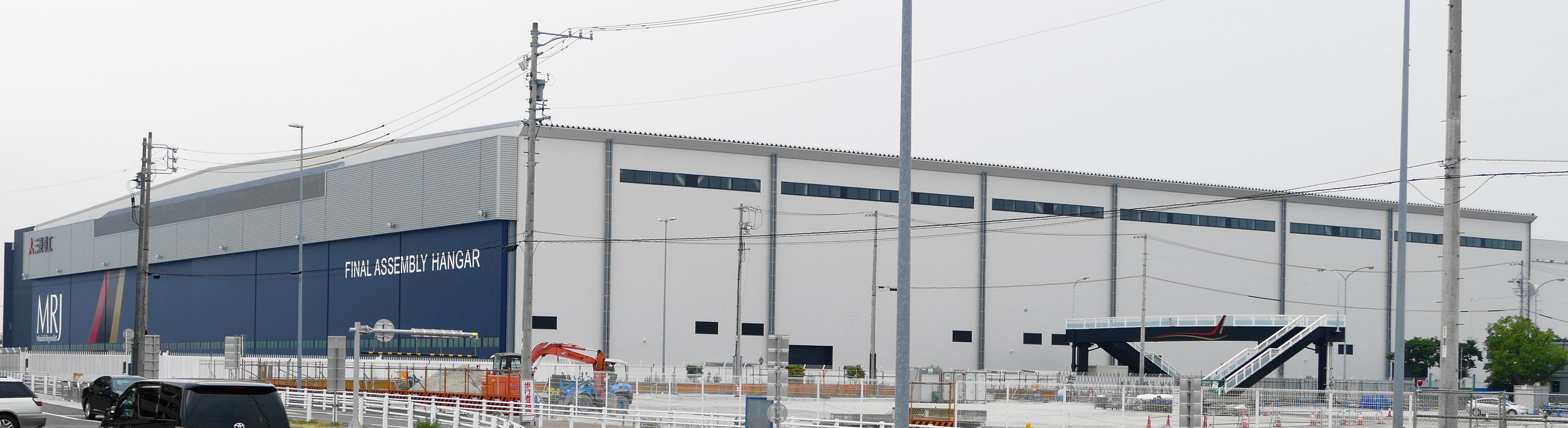
Final assembly hangar in Nagoya.

A new production facility for the aircraft was built at Komaki Airport in Nagoya, Japan, on land purchased from the government at a total cost of 60 billion yen. The 2015 roll-out of the MRJ took place at Komaki, which had previously been the development site of the Mitsubishi A6M Zero fighter. In early 2013, Pratt & Whitney delayed PW1200G certification to the "latter half" of 2014. Mitsubishi announced in June 2013 that it would establish a quality control facility in Illinois for the sourcing of MRJ components from the United States. In August 2013, Mitsubishi announced a third delay to the program, and that the first flight would take place in the second quarter of 2015 instead of end-2013, while the first delivery to launch customer ANA would take place in the second quarter of 2017 instead of 2015, due to parts delivery problems including Pratt & Whitney engines. On 7 September 2013, a prototype of the left wing and four aluminium sections (forward fuselage, front mid fuselage, aft mid fuselage and aft fuselage) were exhibited, to be assembled in October 2013. Mitsubishi hired foreign experts to help with relations with suppliers, ground tests, flight tests, and certification.

During May 2014, the first MRJ90 was fully assembled; work on other airframes was also proceeding. An official rollout of the first flyable airframe occurred on 18 October 2014. MHI employed new production methods such as integral wing stringers, unusually tight tolerances, shot peening of curved surfaces, and vacuum assisted resin transfer molding, intended to increase quality and thus reduce expensive fault correction to keep price competitive.

=== Testing ===
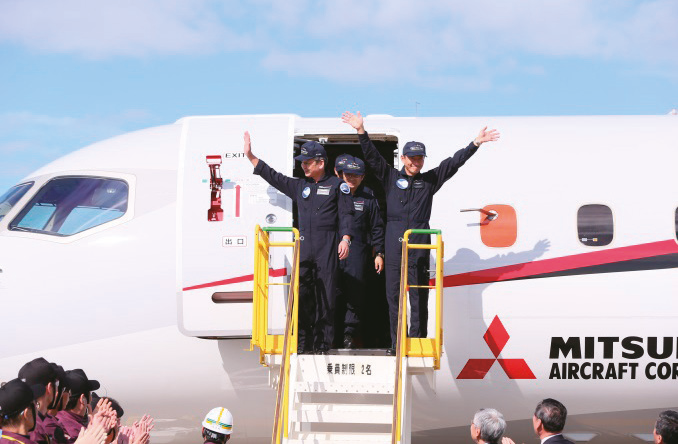
The flight test crew of the MRJ disembarking after its first flight

The maiden flight of the MRJ90 took place on 11 November 2015. On 24 December, Mitsubishi announced a one-year delay for the first delivery of the MRJ until mid-2018. The delay was attributed to insufficient wing strength and the redesign of the landing gear for better safety.

Much of the flight testing for the MRJ90 took place in Moses Lake, Washington, at the Grant County International Airport, due to the crowded airspace in Japan causing scheduling difficulties. Static strength tests were completed on 1 November 2016, and confirmed that the airframe could withstand 1.5 times the maximum load.

In January 2017, a further two-year delay was announced, pushing the expected first delivery to mid-2020. This resulted from moving the avionics bay and wiring looms and in March the flight certification program was extended from 2,500 to 3,000 flying hours. Four of the five delays were caused, at least partly, by failures to document work for certification or similar failures. As a result, development cost ballooned to 350 billion yen (US$3.17 billion) implying that the project might never be able to fully recover its costs. Mitsubishi originally planned to use five flight test aircraft and two ground test aircraft but one or two additional aircraft will also be needed following this introduction of a two-year delay to mid-2020.

On 26 April 2017, the fifth MRJ was complete in ANA livery, lacking only engines and nose cone, aircraft number six and seven had their fuselage and wings joined without the tails, and the eighth, the first MRJ70, was at the assembly line start; Mitsubishi planned to manufacture 12 aircraft concurrently: in station one are joined fuselage sections, in station two the landing gear, wings and horizontal stabilisers are attached, in section three the major components are assembled, in outfitting takes place in section four and ground tests in station five, then the completed aircraft moves to painting. Seattle engineering consultants Aerotec L.L.C. saw problems for avionics and its wiring certification: damage could cause single point of failure, due to fire, water flooding from a ruptured waterline, or from part penetration of an engine explosion. This necessitated hardware changes in the bays, now frozen, but the electrical wiring interconnection system had to be reconfigured with hired specialist Latecoere. By June 2017, 940 hours of flight tests had been performed and the four prototypes had an above 98 percent availability. On 21 August, FTA-2 experienced a flameout 170 km (92 nmi) west of Portland International where it landed; partial damage was confirmed in the PW1200G and the test fleet was grounded until the cause was known. Flight testing resumed on 6 September.

By December 2017, the MRJ test campaign was half complete, covering 1,500 flight hours and less than 1 percent cancelled due to technical issues. The rate was accelerating with tests set up before the January 2017 avionics bay redesign: special runway tests, extreme environment and high altitude tests, to be completed in 2018. An additional flight test aircraft incorporating the redesign was to join the campaign in the second half of 2018, focused on wiring tests such as lightning and high-intensity radio-frequency. Two additional aircraft (10007 and 10010), recently painted white and under structural assembly in December, were expected to join the flight test campaign towards the end of 2018. At the end of the year, the mid-2020 deadline seemed difficult to achieve.

In January 2018, the avionics bay rearrangement and rerouted wiring were almost complete to be adequate for extreme events such as bomb explosions or water ingress underfloor. Upgrades and ground tests were performed on four flight test aircraft from February to March at Moses Lake, preceding flight testing for natural icing, avionics and autopilot, performance, stability and control.

By April 2018, the test fleet had logged 1,900 flight hours. The flight-test fleet attained 2,000 hours in May 2018, and as most of the flight envelope was explored, the next trimester shifted to runway performance: takeoff, landing and minimum control speeds. The MRJ70 test aircraft (number 8 and 9) were in final assembly as of May for expected delivery by the end of 2021, one year after the MRJ90 introduction. An MRJ in All Nippon Airways livery was exhibited at the July Farnborough Airshow, alongside appearances by the similar Embraer 190 E2 and larger Airbus A220.

In October 2018, Bombardier sued Mitsubishi in Seattle, alleging that its ex-employees stole trade secrets to help for US certification. By then, the four MRJ90 prototypes had clocked 2,400 hours, targeting certification in late 2019 or early 2020 and first delivery in mid-2020, while the smaller MRJ70 was expected to be introduced in 2022. After the MRJ program lost ¥47.2 billion for six months to 30 September 2018 on top of its ¥110 billion deficit, Mitsubishi Heavy Industries injected ¥220bn ($1.94 billion) in Mitsubishi Aircraft, raising its stake from 64 percent to 86.7 percent and capital from ¥100 billion to ¥270 billion. Mitsubishi wanted to dismiss the Bombardier allegations and expected to be heard in Seattle's US District Court on 11 January 2019. By December 2018, the Japan Civil Aviation Bureau delivered its type inspection authorisation, allowing to debut certification flight testing in early 2019 with the four MRJ90 in Moses Lake.

In April 2019, a federal judge dismissed Bombardier's claims against Mitsubishi, a strong case but falling short as there was no proof that Mitsubishi knew about those secrets. By then, the program had completed 2,600 flight hours and was undergoing crosswind and climate testing, while two more MRJ90s were expected by the summer.

On 24 June 2019, Bombardier and Mitsubishi announced that Mitsubishi would purchase the CRJ Programme from Bombardier in exchange for US$550 million and assume US$200 million in liabilities. Under the deal, Mitsubishi will acquire the maintenance, support, refurbishment, marketing, and sales activities for the CRJ Series aircraft, including the support network locations in Montréal, Québec, and Toronto, Ontario, its service centres located in Bridgeport, West Virginia, and Tucson, Arizona, and the type certificates.

=== Rebranding ===
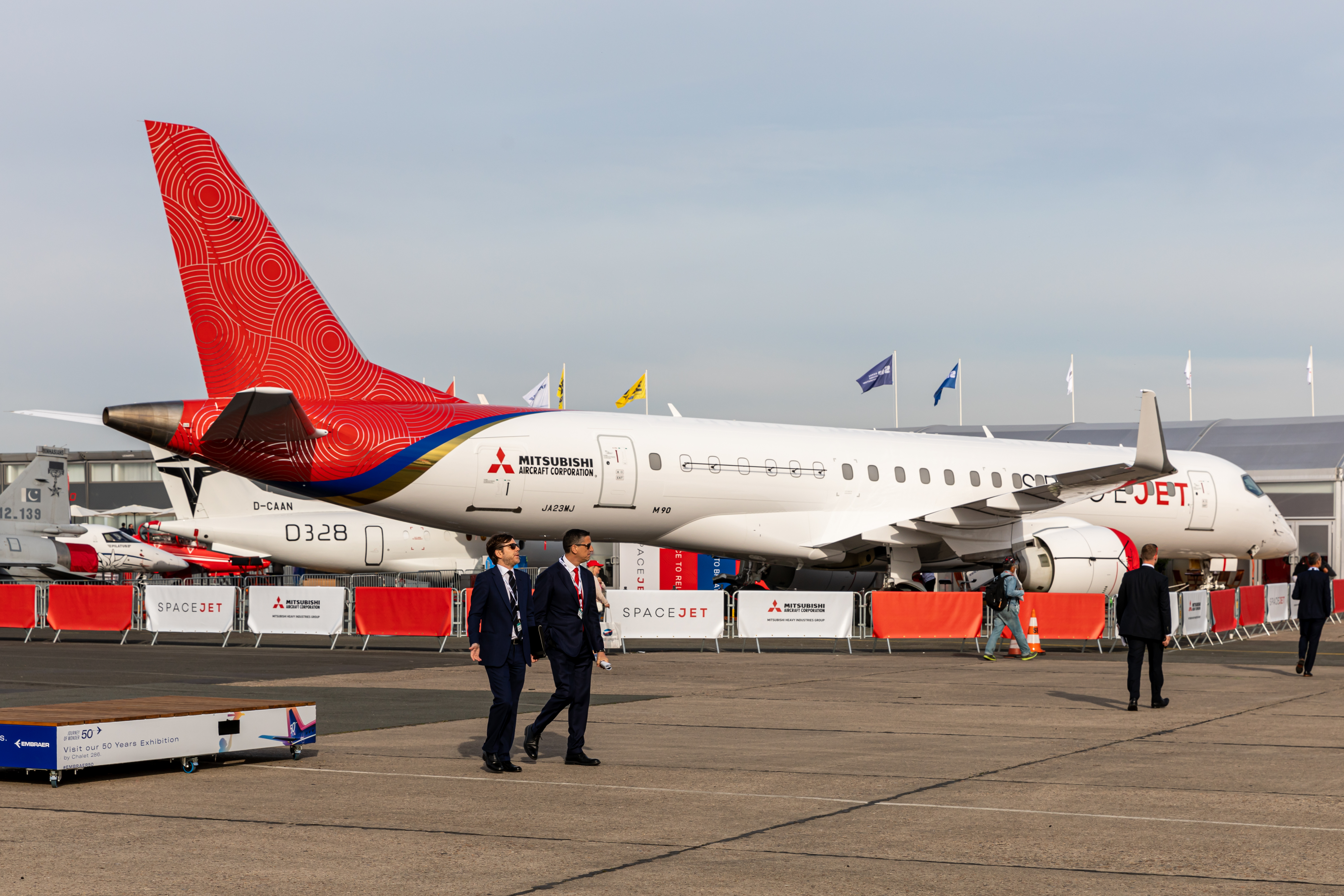
The MRJ90, renamed the SpaceJet M90 at the 2019 Paris Air Show

In June 2019, Mitsubishi rebranded the MRJ program as the SpaceJet. The MRJ90 was renamed as the SpaceJet M90 and a 76-seat variant specially targeted to meet US scope clauses, to be known as the SpaceJet M100, was announced. This version would have been 1.1 m (3 ft 7 in) longer than the abandoned MRJ70 but 1.3 m (4 ft 3 in) shorter than the M90.

The E175-E2 is heavier than the current, scope-compliant E175, with its larger GTF engines, and being longer (by one frame) and wider (by 2.3 m (7 ft 7 in)): when its cabin is full, it can only fill 4 t (8,800 lb) of fuel within the 86,000 lb (39 t) MTOW limit, limiting its range to a short 950 nmi (1,090 mi; 1,760 km). Compared to the E175-E2, the M100 cabin is a tighter fit around its 76 seats, and its wing is lighter, having 3.2 m (10 ft) less span and with smaller winglets than the MRJ90, giving it 50 percent more fuel than the E175-E2 at the MTOW limit for a 1,500 nmi (2,800 km) range with 76 passengers. Without the scope clause limit, a 42 t (93,000 lb) MTOW M100 could fly 1,910 nmi (2,200 mi; 3,540 km) with 84 passengers. The M100 redesign pushed back its projected service entry to 2023, one year later than the MRJ70, while the M90 was set to evolve into the M200.

The 2 ft (0.61 m) longer fuselage could seat 88 in single-class, and at 91 ft (28 m), the wingspan is 4 ft (1.2 m) shorter with the modified canted wingtip. The shorter span would allow operation at Colorado's Aspen/Pitkin County Airport, a popular tourist destination; the CRJ700 was the last jet in production to have the capability, until approval for Skywest E175 in late 2024. The M90 in its final configuration first flew on 18 March 2020, before joining the rest of the test fleet in Moses Lake.

=== Termination ===
In May 2020, Mitsubishi halved the budget of the SpaceJet program for the year ending 31 March 2021. At the time, the company confirmed its commitment to the baseline M90 version but intended to reconsider the M100 in light of the impact of the COVID-19 pandemic on the aviation industry. All work on the SpaceJet outside Japan, including flight testing of the M90 at Moses Lake, was repatriated to the company's headquarters in Nagoya. In October 2020, Mitsubishi announced a further budget reduction and a "temporary pause" to most SpaceJet activities other than type certification documentation while it assessed a "possible program restart."

However, Mitsubishi Aircraft slashed 95 percent of its employees in April 2021, leaving 150 employees, while the SpaceJet program budget was cut by half by 2020, from Y370 billion for FY2018, and was to be further cut to only Y20 billion ($194 million) from fiscal year 2021. In October 2021, the manufacturer confirmed to the Federal Aviation Administration that it did not plan to restart development and production of the SpaceJet in the foreseeable future.

On 17 April 2022, the third MRJ prototype built, formerly registered as JA23MJ, was dismantled.

On 6 February 2023, Mitsubishi Heavy Industries terminated the Spacejet project altogether, stating the uncertainty of the regional jet market size, and announced plans to dissolve its Mitsubishi Aircraft Corporation subsidiary. The announcement was made along with Mitsubishi's financial report, though the company said the decision would not hurt its bottom line.

On 8 March 2023, a second Spacejet prototype, registered as JA21MJ, was dismantled.

A new Spacejet prototype (No.10) was built in 2020, with the aim of obtaining certification. This prototype will be displayed at the Aichi Museum of Flight from late 2026; it is the only preserved airframe.

== Specifications ==
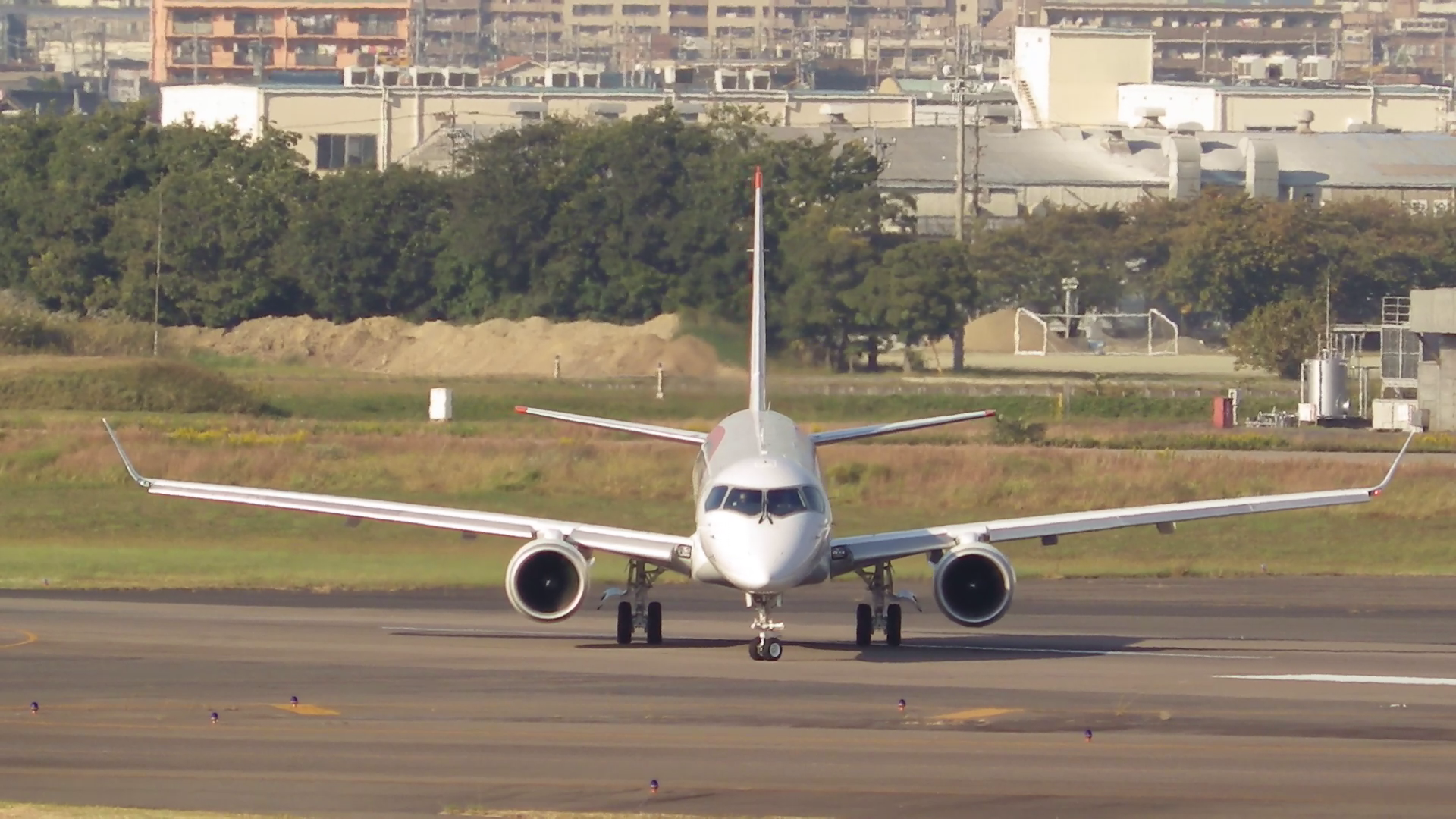
Front view

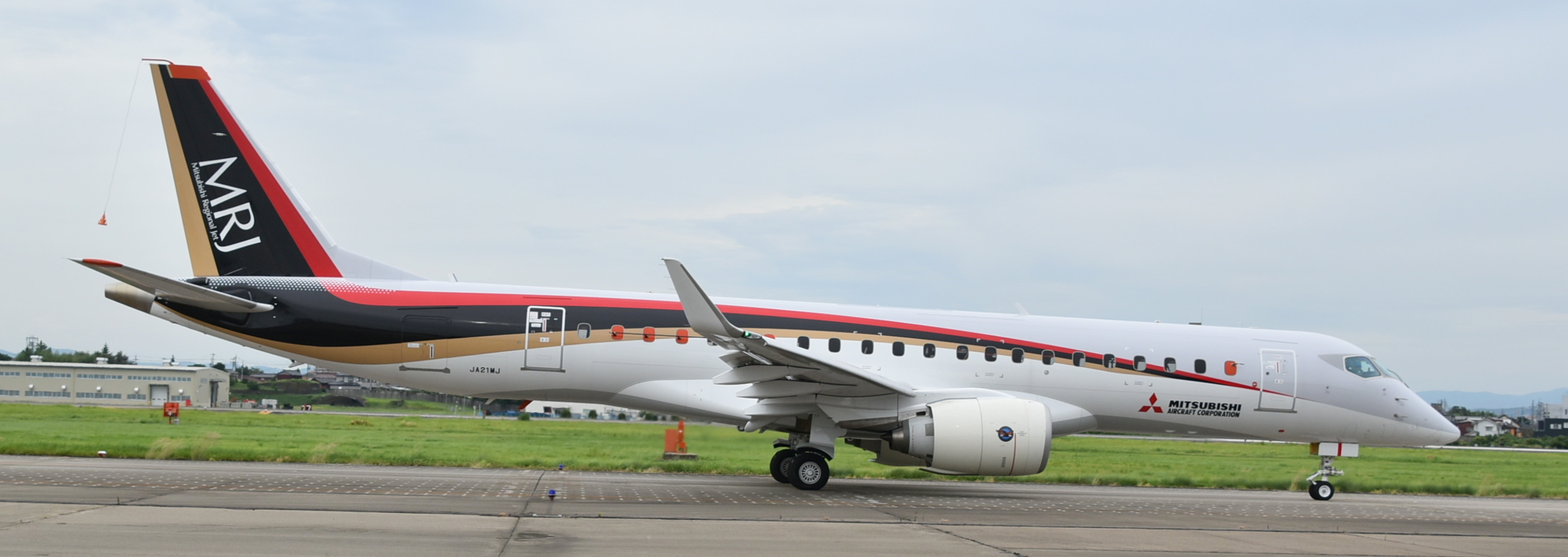
Side view

SpaceJet specifications
Variant	M90	M100
Single class	88Y @ 31" pitch	84Y @ 31" pitch
Mixed class	81 (9J@36" + 72Y@30")	76 (12J+12W+52Y)
Cargo	18.2 m³ / 644 ft³	13.6 m³ / 481 ft³
Cabin	2.02 m / 6 ft 8 in Height × 2.76 m / 9 ft 1 in Width	
Length	35.8 m / 117 ft 5 in	34.5 m / 113.2 ft
Wingspan	29.2 m / 95 ft 10 in	27.8 m / 91.3 ft
Tail height	10.4 m / 34 ft 2 in	10.3 m / 33.9 ft
MTOW	42.8 t / 94,358 lb	42.0 t / 92,594 lb (Note: US scope clause limit: 39 t / 86,000 lb MTOW, 1,500 nmi (1,700 mi; 2,800 km) range with 76 pax, 1,550 m / 5,090 ft takeoff)
OEW	26,000 kg (57,320 lb)	
Fuel capacity	12,100 L / 3,200 US gal / 2,664 imp gal - 21,344 lb / 9,680 kg	
Engines (2x)	Pratt & Whitney PW1200G	
Fan diameter	142 cm (56 in)	
Engine thrust (2x)	78.2 kN / 17,600 lbf	
Range (Note: 102 kg / 225 lb per pax, ISA, no wind, LRC, 100 nmi / 115 mi alternate)	3,770 km / 2,350 mi / 2,040 nmi	3,540 km / 2,200 mi / 1,910 nmi
MMo	Mach 0.78 (515 mph; 448 kn; 829 km/h)	
Ceiling	11,900 m / 39,000 ft	
Takeoff (MTOW, SL, ISA)	1,740 m / 5,710 ft	1,760 m / 5,770 ft
Landing (MLW, dry)	1,480 m / 4,860 ft	1,550 m / 5,090 ft

== Customers ==
=== Order history ===
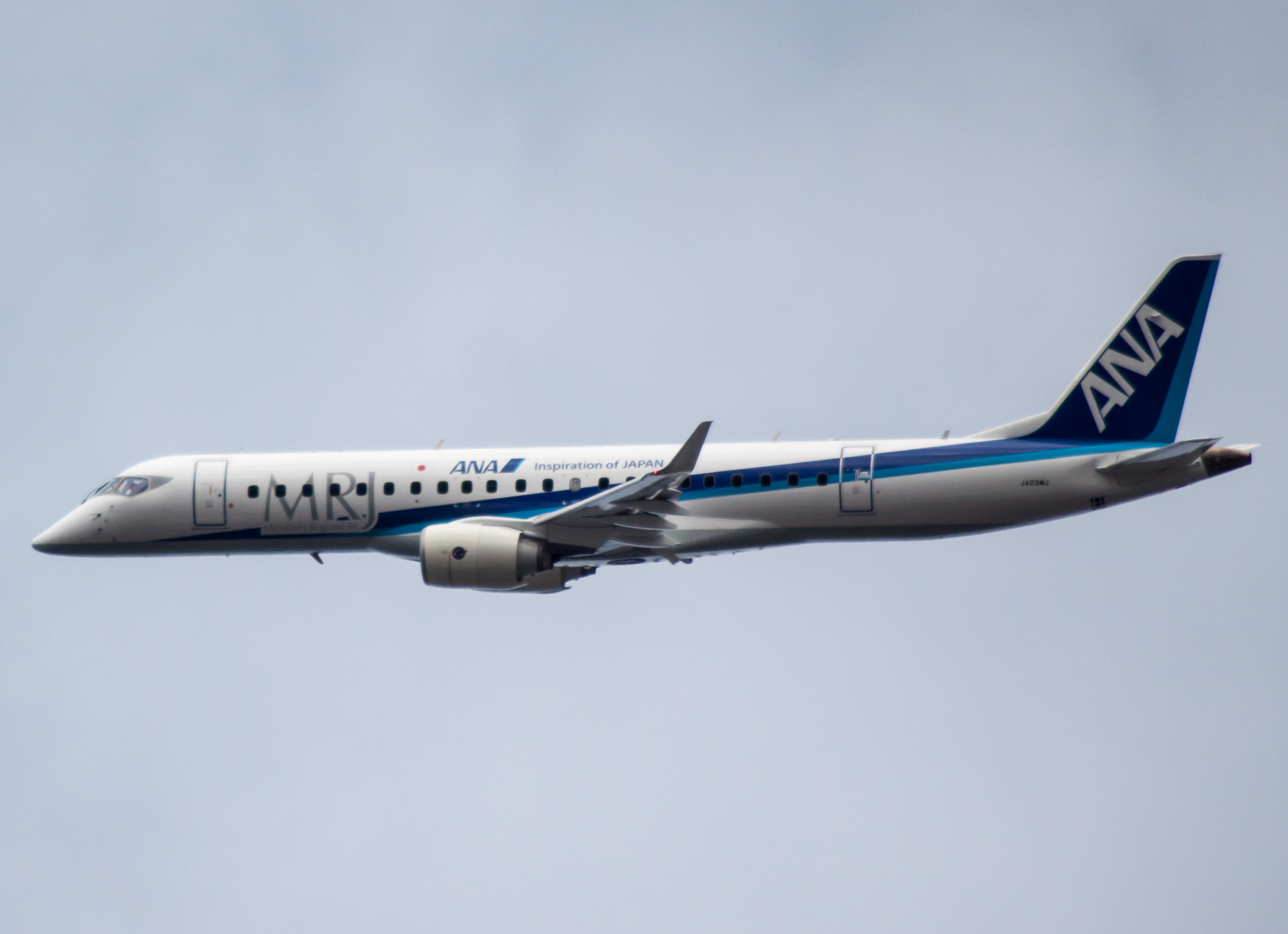
Third prototype of the SpaceJet, JA23MJ in the livery of formerly planned launch customer All Nippon Airways.

In 2008, All Nippon Airways was the first customer, with an order for 15 MRJ 90s and an option for 10 more.

In March 2008, and again in October 2008, Sankei Shimbun and Fuji Sankei Business I reported that the government of Japan would buy ten MRJs to serve as short-haul and small-field VIP transports, supplementing the existing Japanese Air Force One Boeing 747 aircraft. The government reportedly was still considering this option as of July 2013, with MRJs possibly supplementing the then new Boeing 777 on domestic and short-haul government flights.

At the July 2012 Farnborough Airshow, SkyWest agreed to buy 100 MRJ90s, to be delivered between 2017 and 2020. The deal was worth $4.2 billion at list prices. During the 2013 Regional Airlines Association conference, held in Montreal, Quebec, Canada, Mitsubishi announced that ANI Group Holdings, which firmed a MoU for five MRJ aircraft in June 2011, cancelled the deal, without giving further details.

On 20 July 2016, one of the officials at Iran's ministry of transportation announced Iran was buying 25 ATR airplanes for Iran Aseman Airlines and for further purchases Mitsubishi has shown interest in offering 20 MRJ planes. On 21 May 2017, Iran cancelled its plans to buy Mitsubishi's Regional Jet (MRJ); inability to set a delivery timeline for ordered aircraft and lack of testing were cited as their main reasons.

The MRJ's future was uncertain after six years of delays, with 70 percent of the backlog shared by two US regional carriers bound by scope clauses: the MRJ90 is too heavy and the smaller MRJ70 accommodates seven fewer seats than the 76 permitted. Following five postponements, and having lost ten percent of the MRJ's order book following the acquisition of Eastern Air Lines by Swift Air (bought existing Eastern assets only), Mitsubishi Aircraft closed its books at the end of March 2018 with a negative net worth of $979 million. By December 2018, the MRJ90 had 213 firm orders plus 194 commitments. During 2019, some of these orders were subsequently cancelled or converted to the new M100 variant, which had 115 commitments from US operators as of 31 October 2019.

On 19 June 2019, Mitsubishi signed a Memorandum of Understanding with an unnamed American customer for 15 of the new 76-seat SpaceJet M100 variant, to be delivered from 2024.

On 5 September 2019, US regional carrier Mesa Airlines signed a Memorandum of Understanding for up to 100 SpaceJet M100s, 50 of which were targeted as firm orders and 50 as purchase rights. Deliveries would have begun in 2024.

On 31 October 2019, Trans States Holdings cancelled its order for 100 MRJ90s (50 firm, 50 optional) because the aircraft did not comply with US airlines' scope clauses.

=== Outstanding orders prior to the cancellation of development ===
Order date	Airline / Purchaser	Entry into service	Type			Remarks
Order date	Airline / Purchaser	Entry into service	M100	M90	Options	Remarks
27 March 2008	(Japan) All Nippon Airways	2025	—	15	10	was to be operated by ANA Wings
11 July 2012	(United States) SkyWest	2022	—	100	100	
28 January 2015	Japan Airlines	2023	—	32	—	was to be operated by J-Air
11 July 2016	(Sweden) Rockton AB (Lessor)	2020	—	10	10	
5 September 2019	(United States) Mesa Airlines	2024	50	—	50	
Total			50	157	170	

=== Cancelled orders ===
Order date	Airline / Purchaser	Type			Remarks
Order date	Airline / Purchaser	MRJ70	MRJ90	Options	Remarks
16 June 2011	(Hong Kong) ANI Group Holdings (Lessor)	5		—	MoU cancelled in 2013
2014	(United States) Eastern Air Lines	—	20	20	Airline ceased operations in 2017 and order was subsequently terminated in January 2018
14 July 2014	(Myanmar) Air Mandalay	—	6	4	Airline ceased operations in 2018
2 October 2009	(United States) Trans States Holdings	—	50	50	Cancelled in October 2019 as the M90 does not comply with U.S. scope clauses
16 February 2016	(United States) Aerolease Aviation (Lessor)	—	10	10	Contract ended on 8 January 2021

== See also ==
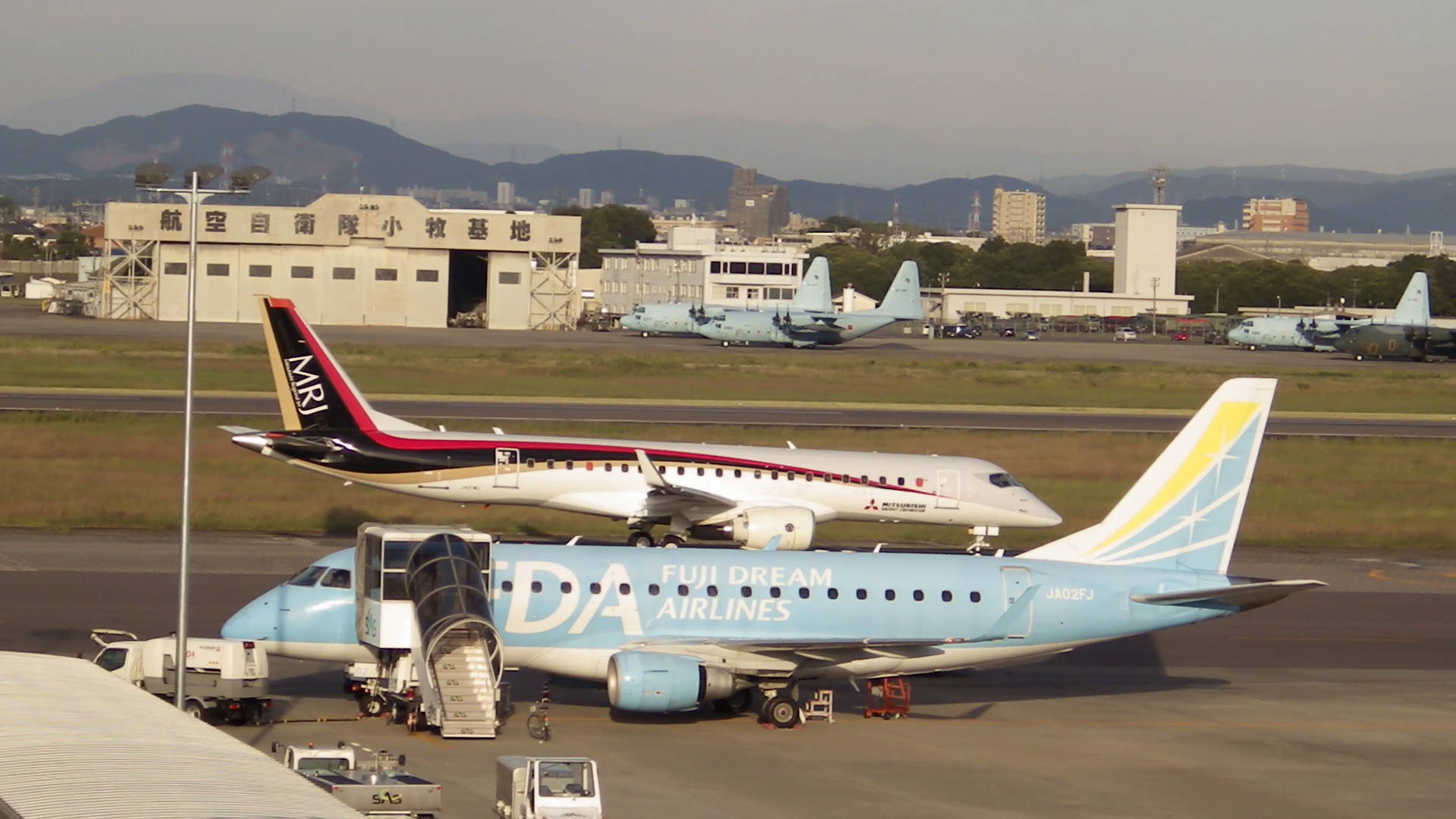
The MRJ behind an Embraer E-Jet 175

Aircraft of comparable role, configuration, and era

- Airbus A220
- Antonov An-148
- Bombardier CRJ700 series
- Comac C909
- Embraer E-Jets/E-Jets E2
- Sukhoi Superjet 100
