= Mitsubishi Aircraft Corporation =

Aerospace subsidiary of Mitsubishi Heavy Industries

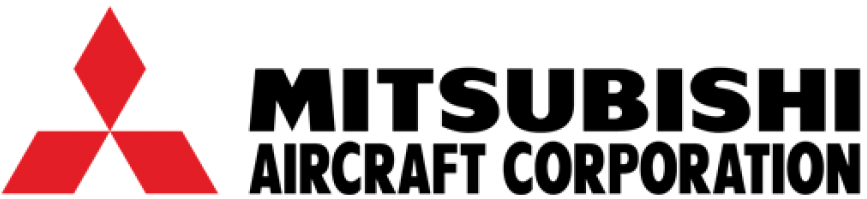
- Type: Subsidiary
- Industry: Aerospace
- Predecessor: Mitsubishi Aircraft Company
- Founded: 1 April 2008; 18 years ago
- Defunct: 6 February 2023
- Fate: Liquidation
- Headquarters: Japan
- Products: Aircraft
- Parent: Mitsubishi Heavy Industries
- Website: mhi.com

Mitsubishi Aircraft Corporation (三菱航空機株式会社, Mitsubishi Kōkūki Kabushiki-gaisha), abbreviated MITAC, was a Japanese company that developed, produced, sold and supported the Mitsubishi SpaceJet (formerly MRJ) passenger airliners. The manufacturing of the aircraft was planned to be carried out by parent company Mitsubishi Heavy Industries (MHI). In February 2023, its parent company MHI terminated the Spacejet project.

== History ==
MITAC was established on 1 April 2008. MHI owned 64% of the shares of the company, while Toyota Motor Corporation and Mitsubishi Corporation each owned 10% of the shares; other shareholders include state-owned Development Bank of Japan, Sumitomo Corporation and Mitsui & Co.

MITAC is headquartered at Nagoya Airfield in Komaki in Aichi Prefecture, adjacent to the MRJ production facilities. It has branch offices in Nagoya and Tokyo, which are co-located with MHI offices. MITAC has overseas subsidiaries based in Amsterdam and in Renton, Washington.

CEO Teruaki Kawai has indicated that the company will not produce aircraft larger than the MRJ, as MHI is a major supplier to Boeing (including manufacturing wings for the Boeing 787), and the group generally lacks the capability to compete with Airbus and Boeing.

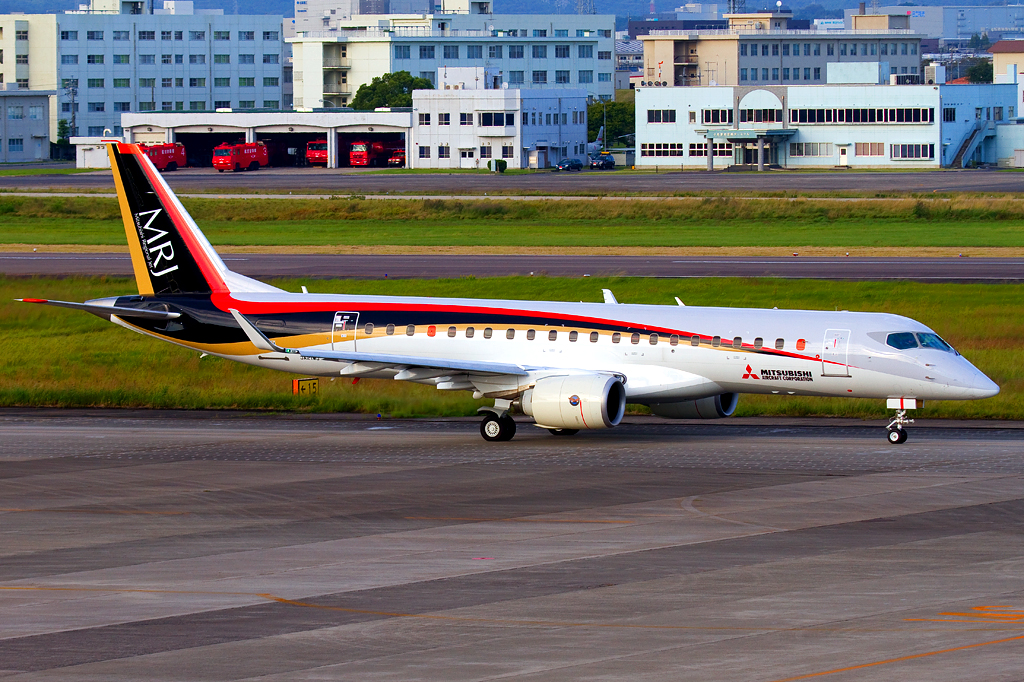
The first Mitsubishi Regional Jet (MRJ) prototype at Nagoya Airfield in Komaki (2015)

Following Bombardier Aviation's divestment of its CSeries and Dash 8 programmes, on 25 June 2019, MHI announced the acquisition of Bombardier's CRJ programme, in a deal expected to close in the first half of 2020, subject to regulatory approval. MHI will benefit from Bombardier's global expertise in areas ranging from engineering and certification to customer relations and support, boosting its SpaceJet programme, and potentially enabling the SpaceJet to be produced in North America.

The deal includes two service centres in Canada and two in the US, as well as the type certificates for the CRJ. Bombardier will retain its assembly facility at Mirabel, near Montreal, Canada, and will continue to produce the CRJ on behalf of MHI until the current order backlog is complete.

In September 2019, MITAC announced the creation of the "SpaceJet Montreal Centre" in the Boisbriand suburb of Montreal, initially employing around 100 staff to participate in Spacejet M90 certification and entry-into-service activities. Flight testing was being conducted from a site in Moses Lake, Washington, in partnership with AeroTEC, before being stopped in May 2020 as a result of budget cuts in light of the COVID-19 pandemic, with uncertainty about whether testing will eventually resume.

On 6 February 2023, Mitsubishi Heavy Industries terminated the Spacejet project along with its plans to enter the jetliner business and planned to liquidate its Mitsubishi Aircraft Corporation subsidiary. As of 25 April 2023, the company was renamed MSJ Asset Management Company as part of the liquidation and its website was taken offline.

== Products ==
- Mitsubishi SpaceJet (MRJ)
