= Major airlines of the United States =

Airlines with more than $1 billion in yearly revenue

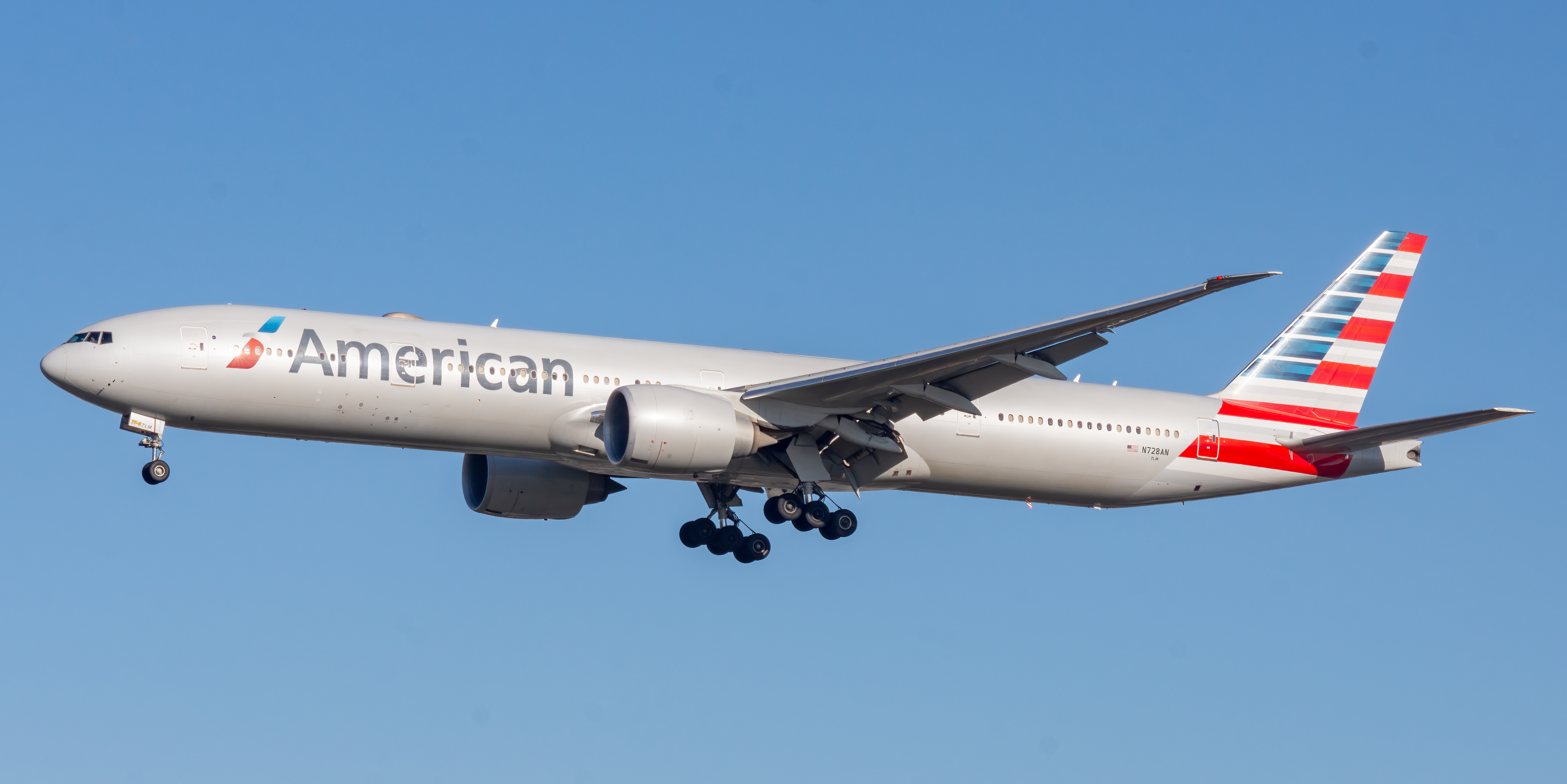
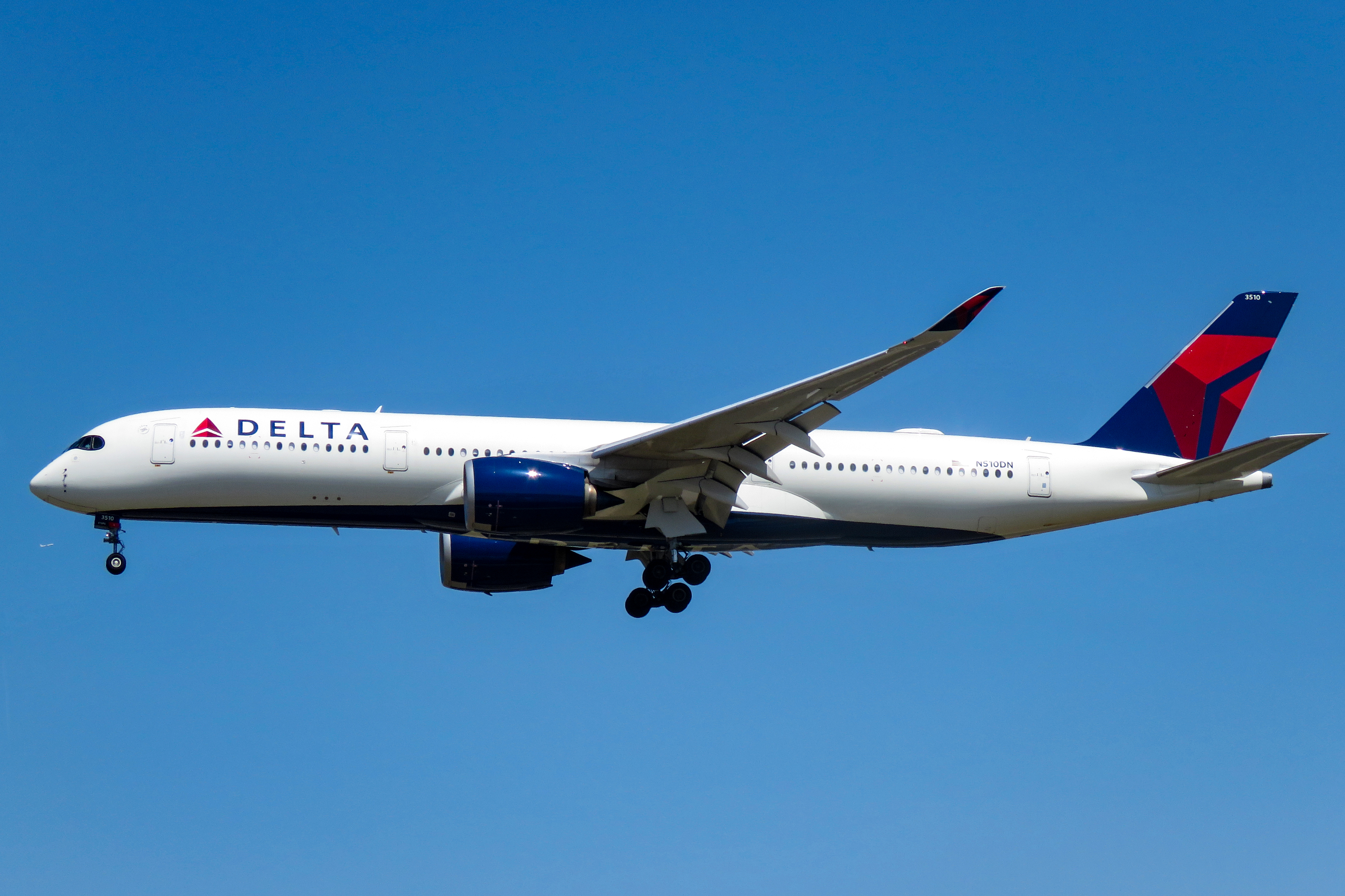
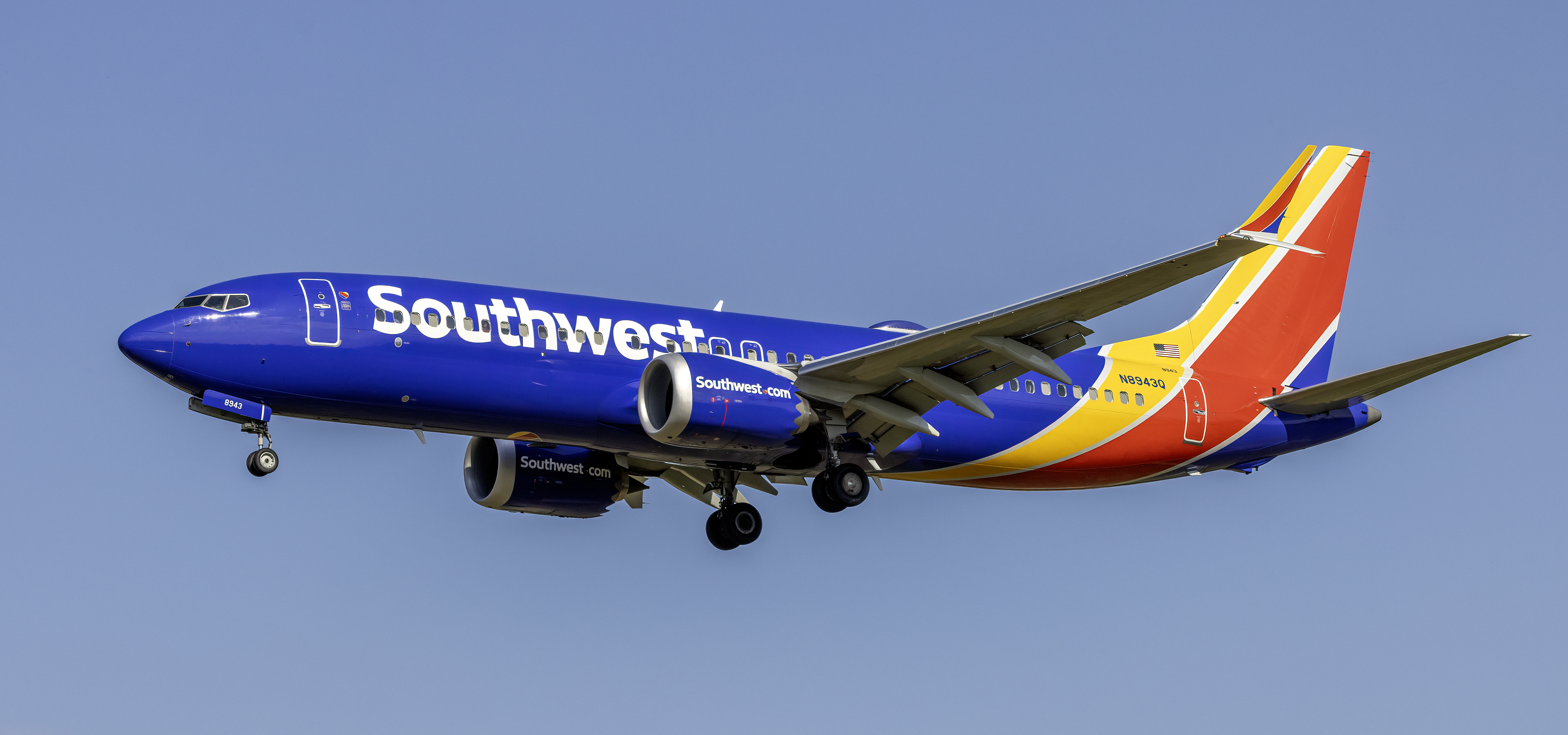
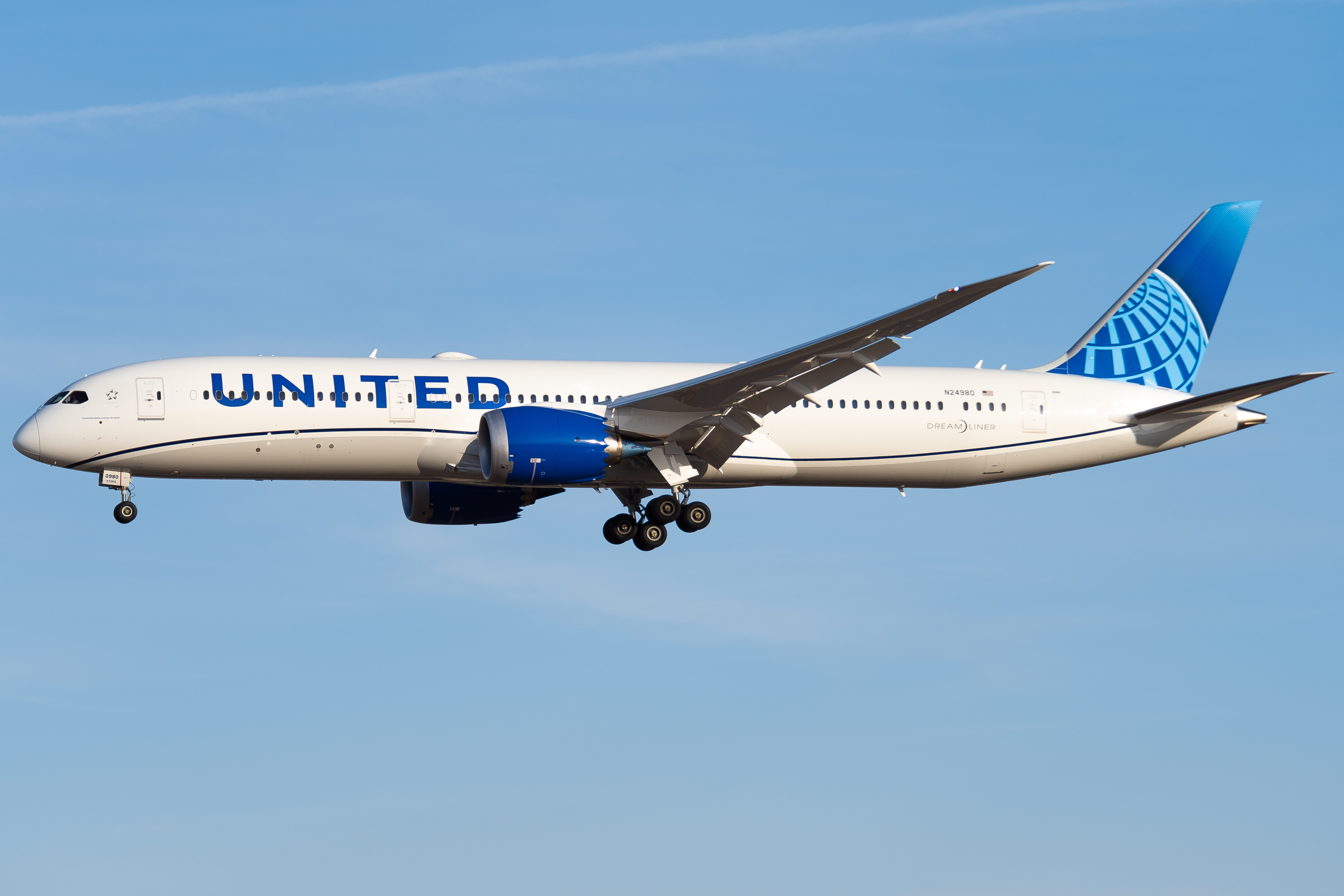
The "Big 4" American airlines. Clockwise from top left: American Airlines, Delta Air Lines, United Airlines, and Southwest Airlines

The United States Department of Transportation defines a major carrier or major airline carrier as a American-based airline that posts more than $1 billion in operating revenue during a fiscal year, grouped accordingly as "Group III".

== Airlines ==
The Bureau of Transportation Statistics updates the listing of major airlines once per year. According to FY2025 operating revenues, 19 carriers met the requirement for Group III status, including Spirit Airlines which later ceased operations as of May of 2026: (Note: Only 18 carriers are listed. The 19th designated Group III carrier, Spirit Airlines, ceased operations in May 2026.)

=== Mainline passenger ===
- Alaska Airlines (subsidiary of Alaska Air Group)
- Allegiant Air (subsidiary of Allegiant Travel Company)
- American Airlines (Note: Considered one of the "Big 4" U.S. airlines.) (subsidiary of American Airlines Group)
- Delta Air Lines
- Frontier Airlines
- Hawaiian Airlines (subsidiary of Alaska Air Group)
- JetBlue
- Southwest Airlines
- Sun Country Airlines (subsidiary of Allegiant Travel Company)
- United Airlines

=== Regional passenger ===
- Envoy Air (subsidiary of American Airlines Group)
- PSA Airlines (subsidiary of American Airlines Group)
- Republic Airways
- SkyWest Airlines

=== Cargo ===
- Atlas Air
- FedEx Express
- Kalitta Air
- UPS Airlines

== See also ==
- Largest airlines in the world
- List of largest airlines in North America
- List of airlines of the United States
- Legacy carrier
