= Aircraft flight manual =

Document or data set containing information about aircraft

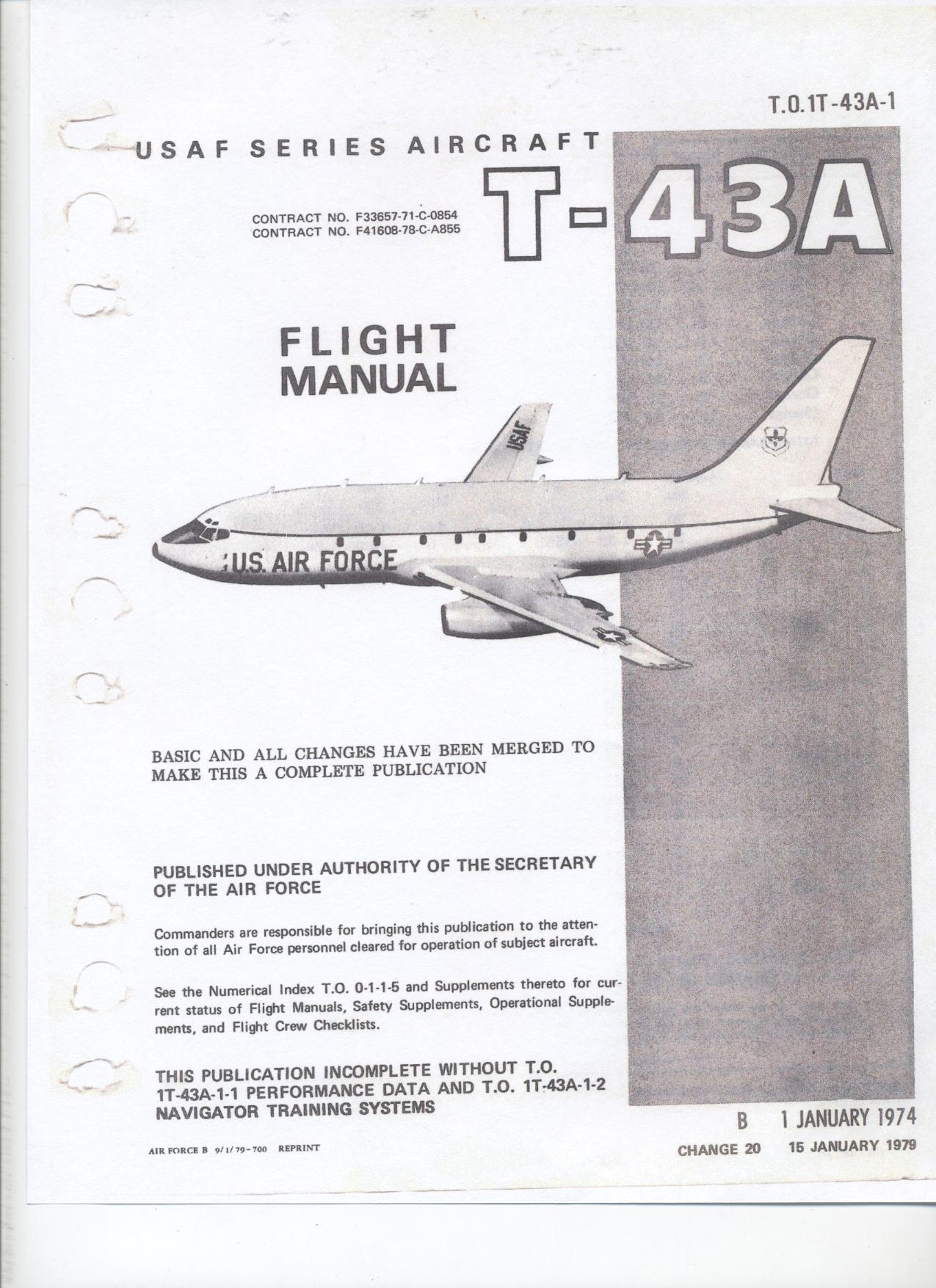
Title of the Boeing T-43A Flight Manual

An aircraft flight manual (AFM) is a paper book or electronic information set containing information required to operate an aircraft of certain type or particular aircraft of that type (each AFM is tailored for a specific aircraft, though aircraft of the same type naturally have very similar AFMs). The information within an AFM is also referred to as Technical Airworthiness Data (TAWD). A typical flight manual will contain the following: operating limitations, Normal/Abnormal/Emergency operating procedures, performance data and loading information.

An AFM will often include:

- V speeds
- Aircraft gross weight
- Maximum ramp weight
- Maximum takeoff weight
- Manufacturer's empty weight
- Operating empty weight
- Centre of gravity limitations
- Zero-fuel weight
- Takeoff distance
- Landing distance

Originally, an AFM would follow whichever format and order the manufacturer felt appropriate. Eventually, the General Aviation Manufacturers Association came to an agreement to standardize in GAMA Specification No. 1 the format of AFM's for general aviation airplanes and helicopters known as the Pilot's Operating Handbook (POH).

The chapters of a POH always follow the format of:

1. General
2. Limitations
3. Emergency Procedures
4. Normal Procedures
5. Performance
6. Weight and Balance/Equipment List
7. Systems Description
8. Handling, Service, and Maintenance
9. Supplements

== See also ==
- Index of aviation articles
- Electronic flight bag
- Quick Reference Handbook
