= Airbus A319 =

Airliner, shortened variant of the A320 family

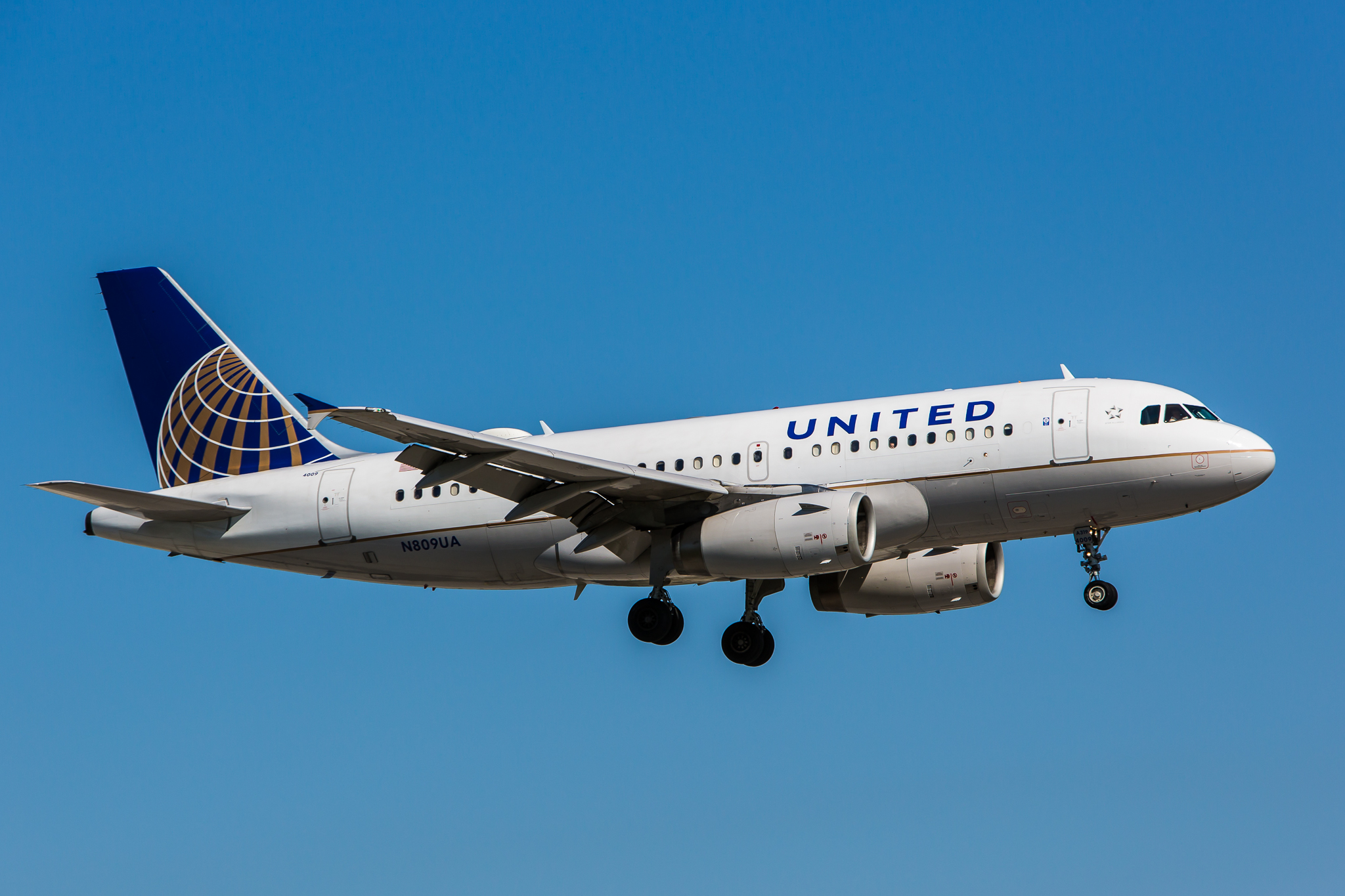
- A United Airlines Airbus A319 in 2014

General information
- Other name: A319ceo
- Type: Narrow-body jet airliner
- National origin: Multi-national (Note: Final assembly in China and Germany.)
- Manufacturer: Airbus
- Status: In service
- Primary users: American Airlines: United Airlines; EasyJet; Delta Air Lines
- Number built: 1,516 as of May 2025

History
- Manufactured: 1994–2021
- Introduction date: 25 April 1996 with Swissair
- First flight: 25 August 1995
- Developed from: Airbus A320
- Variant: Airbus A318
- Developed into: Airbus A319neo

The Airbus A319 is a member of the Airbus A320 family of short- to medium-range, narrow-body, commercial passenger twin-engine jet airliners manufactured by Airbus. (Note: Airbus was originally a consortium of European aerospace companies named, Airbus Industrie, and is now fully owned by Airbus, originally named EADS. Airbus' name has been Airbus SAS since 2001.) The A319 carries 124 to 156 passengers and has a maximum range of 3,700 nmi (6,900 km; 4,300 mi). Final assembly of the aircraft took place in Hamburg, Germany and Tianjin, China.

The A319 is a shortened-fuselage variant of the Airbus A320 and entered service in April 1996 with Swissair, around two years after the stretched Airbus A321 and eight years after the original A320. The aircraft shares a common type rating with all other Airbus A320 family variants, allowing existing A320 family pilots to fly the aircraft without the need for further training.

In December 2010, Airbus announced a new generation of the A320 family, the re-engined A320neo family (new engine option). The similarly shortened fuselage A319neo variant offers new, more efficient engines, combined with airframe improvements and the addition of winglets, named "sharklets" by Airbus. The aircraft promises fuel savings of up to 15%. The A319neo sales are much lower than other A320neo variants, with around 1% of orders by June 2020. The previous A319 generation was retroactively renamed the A319ceo (current engine option).

As of August 2025, a total of 1,518 Airbus A319 aircraft have been delivered, of which 1,264 are in service. In addition, another 24 airliners are on order. American Airlines is the largest operator with 133 A319ceo in its fleet.

== Development ==
=== Background ===
The first member of the A320 family was the A320 which was launched in March 1984 and first flew on 22 February 1987. The family was extended to include the stretched A321 (first delivered 1994), the shortened A319 (1996), and the further shortened A318 (2003). The A320 family pioneered the use of digital fly-by-wire flight control systems, as well as side stick controls, in commercial aircraft. The A319 was developed at the request of Steven Udvar-Hazy, the former president and CEO of ILFC according to The New York Times.

=== Origins and design ===
The A319 design is a shortened fuselage, minimum change derivative of the A320 with its origins in the 130- to 140-seat SA1, part of the Single-Aisle studies. The SA1 was shelved as the consortium concentrated on its bigger siblings. After healthy sales of the A320/A321, Airbus re-focused on what was then known as the A320M-7, meaning A320 minus seven fuselage frames. It would provide direct competition for the 737-300/-700. The shrink was achieved through the removal of four fuselage frames fore and three aft the wing, cutting the overall length by 3.73 metres (12 ft 3 in). Consequently, the number of overwing exits was reduced from four to two. High-density A319s, such as 156-seat aircraft used by EasyJet, retain four overwing exits. The bulk-cargo door was replaced by an aft container door, which can take in reduced height LD3-45 containers. Minor software changes were made to accommodate the different handling characteristics; otherwise the aircraft is largely unchanged. Power is provided by either the CFM56-5A engine made by CFM International, or the V2500-A5 engine made by International Aero Engines, both derated to 98 kN (22,000 lbf), with an option for 105 kN (24,000 lbf) of thrust.

With virtually the same fuel capacity as the A320-200 and fewer passengers, the range with 124 passengers in a two-class configuration extends to 6,650 km (3,590 nmi), or 6,850 km (3,700 nmi) with the "Sharklets". The A319's wingspan is wider than the aircraft's overall length.

=== Production and testing ===
Airbus began offering the new model from 22 May 1992, and the A319's first customer was ILFC, who signed for six aircraft. Anticipating further orders by Swissair and Alitalia, Airbus launched the $275 million (€250 million) programme on 10 June 1993. On 23 March 1995, the first A319 underwent final assembly at Airbus's German plant in Hamburg, where the A321s are also assembled. It was rolled out on 24 August 1995, with the maiden flight the following day. The certification programme took 350 airborne hours involving two aircraft; certification for the CFM56-5B6/2-equipped variant was granted in April 1996, and the qualification for the V2524-A5 started the following month.

Delivery of the first A319, to Swissair, took place on 25 April 1996, entering service by month's end. In January 1997, an A319 broke a record during a delivery flight by flying 3,588 nautical miles (6,645 km) on the great circle route from Hamburg to Winnipeg, Manitoba, in 9 hours 5 minutes. The A319 has proved popular with low-cost airlines such as EasyJet, with 172 delivered.

A total of 1,484 of the A319ceo (current engine option) model have been delivered.

== Variants ==
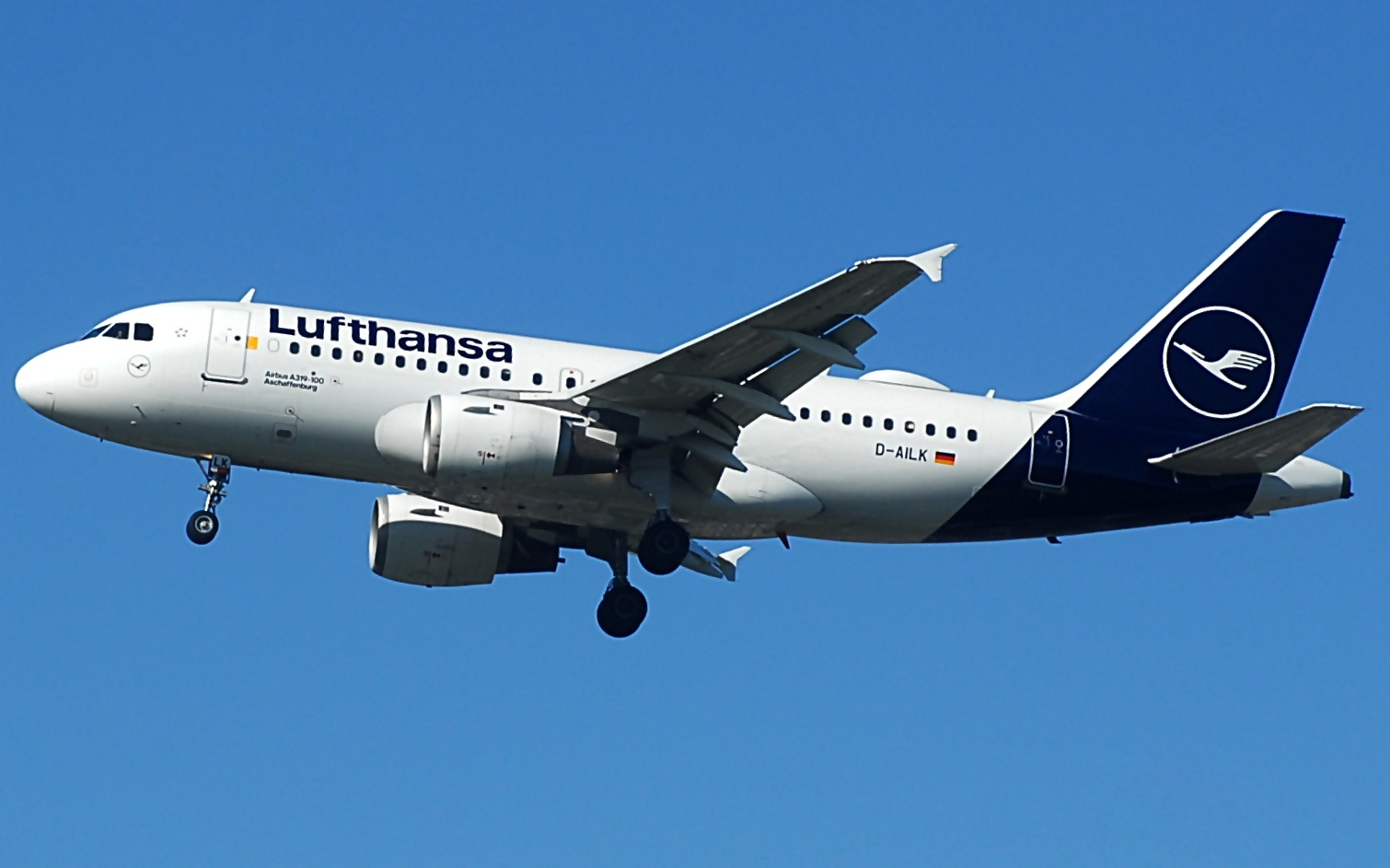
Lufthansa A319-100

=== A319CJ ===
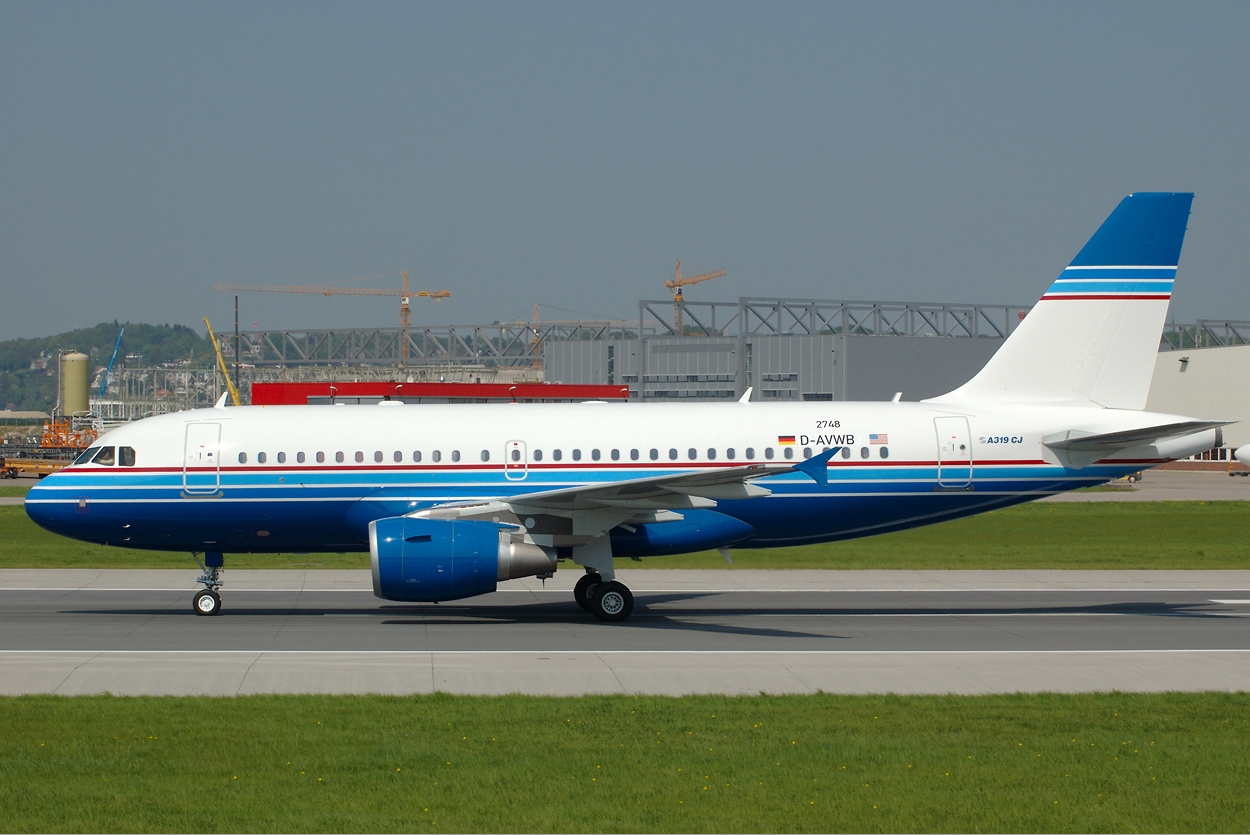
Pharmair Corporation A319CJ

The A319CJ (rebranded ACJ319 "Elegance") is the corporate jet version of the A319. It incorporates removable extra fuel tanks (up to six additional Center Tanks) which are installed in the cargo compartment, and an increased service ceiling of 12,500 m (41,000 ft). Range with eight passengers' payload and auxiliary fuel tanks (ACTs) is up to 6,000 nautical miles (6,900 mi; 11,100 km). Upon resale, the aircraft can be reconfigured as a standard A319 by removing its extra tanks and corporate cabin outfit, thus maximising its resale value. It was formerly also known as the ACJ, or Airbus Corporate Jet, while starting with 2014 it has the marketing designation ACJ319.

The aircraft seats up to 39 passengers, but may be outfitted by the customers into any configuration. Tyrolean Jet Service Nfg. GmbH & CO KG, MJET and Reliance Industries are among its users. The A319CJ competes with other ultralarge-cabin corporate jets such as the Boeing 737-700-based Boeing Business Jet (BBJ) and Embraer Lineage 1000, as well as with large-cabin and ultralong-range Gulfstream G650, Gulfstream G550 and Bombardier's Global 6000. It is powered by the same engine types as the A320. The A319CJ was used by the Escadron de Transport, d'Entraînement et de Calibration which is in charge of transportation for France's officials and also by the Flugbereitschaft of the German Air Force for transportation of Germany's officials. An ACJ serves as a presidential or official aircraft of Albania, Armenia, Azerbaijan, Bulgaria, Czech Republic, Germany, Hungary, Italy, Malaysia, Slovakia, Thailand, Turkey, Ukraine, and Venezuela.

Starting from 2014, a modularized cabin version of the ACJ319, known as "Elegance", is also available. It is said to be able to lower cost and ease reconfiguration.

=== A319LR ===
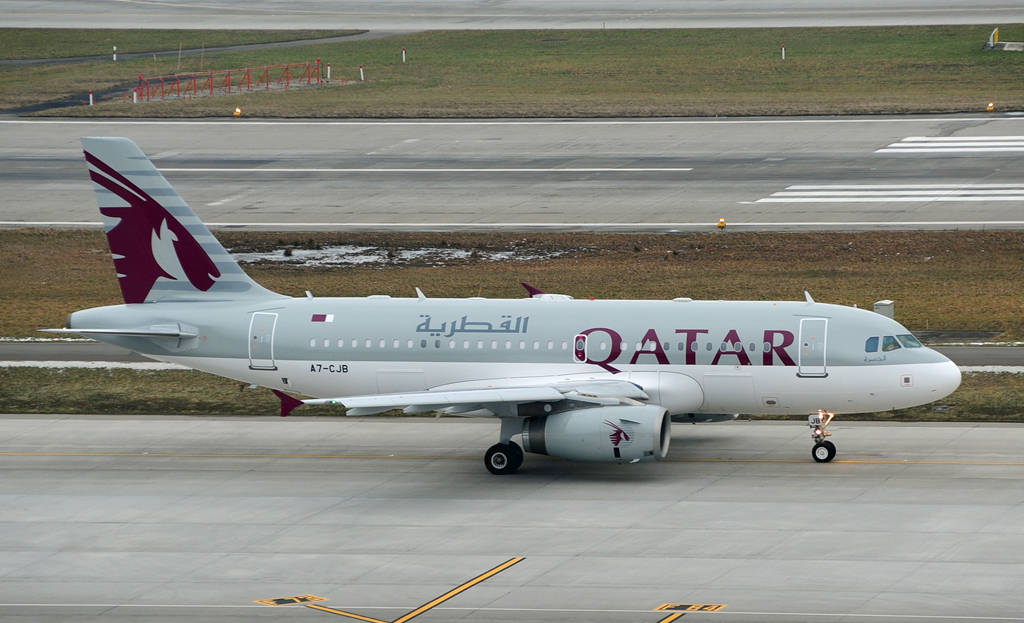
A Qatari A319LR in 2011.

The A319LR is the longer-range version of the A319. The typical range of the A319LR is increased up to 4,500 nautical miles (8,300 km) compared to the standard A319. Qatar Airways was the launch customer, receiving two A319-100LRs, PrivatAir received two A319LRs in 2003, and Eurofly acquired two in 2005.

=== A319neo ===
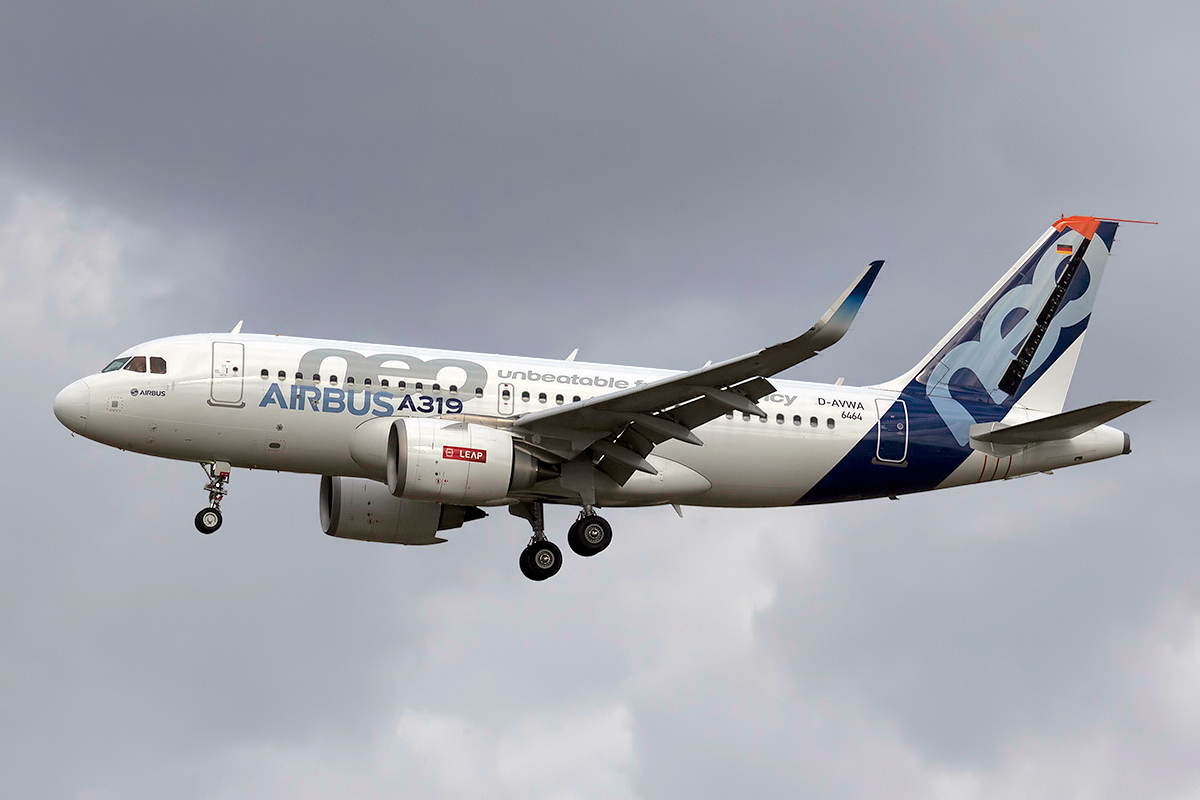
Airbus A319neo prototype

The A319neo is the shortest variant of the Airbus A320neo family of airliners developed since December 2010 by Airbus, with the suffix "neo" meaning "new engine option". It is the last step of the A320 Enhanced (A320E) modernisation programme, which was started in 2006. The A319neo replaces the original A319, which is now referred to as A319ceo, for "current engine option".

In addition to the new engines, the modernisation programme also included such improvements as: aerodynamic refinements, large curved winglets (sharklets), weight savings, a new aircraft cabin with larger hand luggage spaces, and an improved air purification system. Customers will have a choice of either the CFM International LEAP-1A or the Pratt & Whitney PW1100G engines.

These improvements in combination are predicted to result in 15% lower fuel consumption per aircraft, 8% lower operating costs, reduced noise production, and a reduction of nitrogen oxide (NO_{x}) emissions by at least 10% compared to the A320 series, as well as an increase in range of approximately 500 nautical miles (600 mi; 900 km).

The A319neo is the least popular variant of the Airbus A320neo family, with total orders for only 57 aircraft placed as of October 2025, compared with 4,057 for the A320neo and 7,142 for the A321neo.

=== Military variants ===
==== A319 MPA ====
The Airbus A319 MPA (Maritime Patrol Aircraft) is a military derivative of the Airbus A319. Development was announced in 2018 by Airbus Defence and Space to compete against the Boeing P-8 Poseidon, which is a derivative aircraft of the Boeing 737 manufactured in the United States.

==== A319 OH ====
The new observation platform A319OH which means "Offener Himmel" (meaning "Open Sky") is equipped with electro-optical sensors, an EO-S/digital camera and an infrared sensor (IR-S). It is based on an A319CJ from Lufthansa Technik.

This aircraft is designed for the German Air Force which uses it to perform surveillance missions as part of the Treaty on Open Skies. Twenty missions are planned every year by the German Air Force, and it is offered for lease to other countries who want to conduct such mission without the appropriate equipment.

==== Other military variants ====
VC-319A

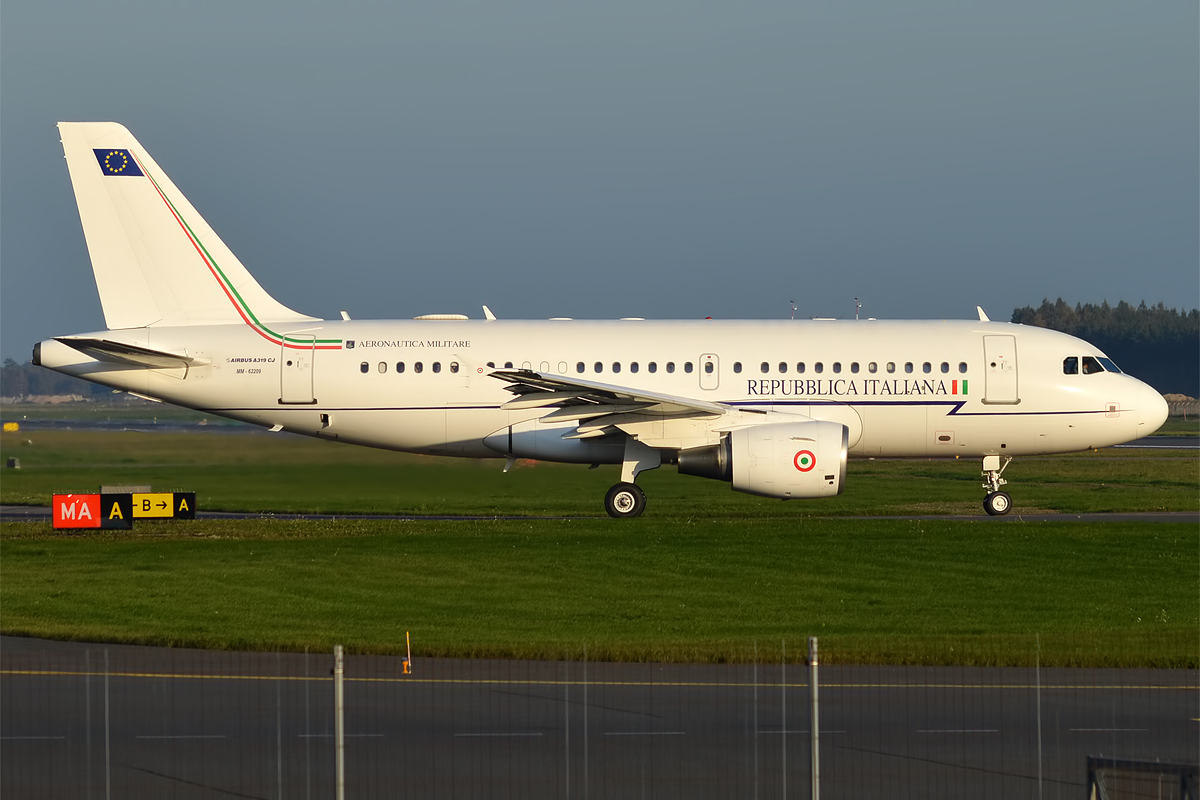
Airbus VC-319A - 31st Wing, Italian Air Force

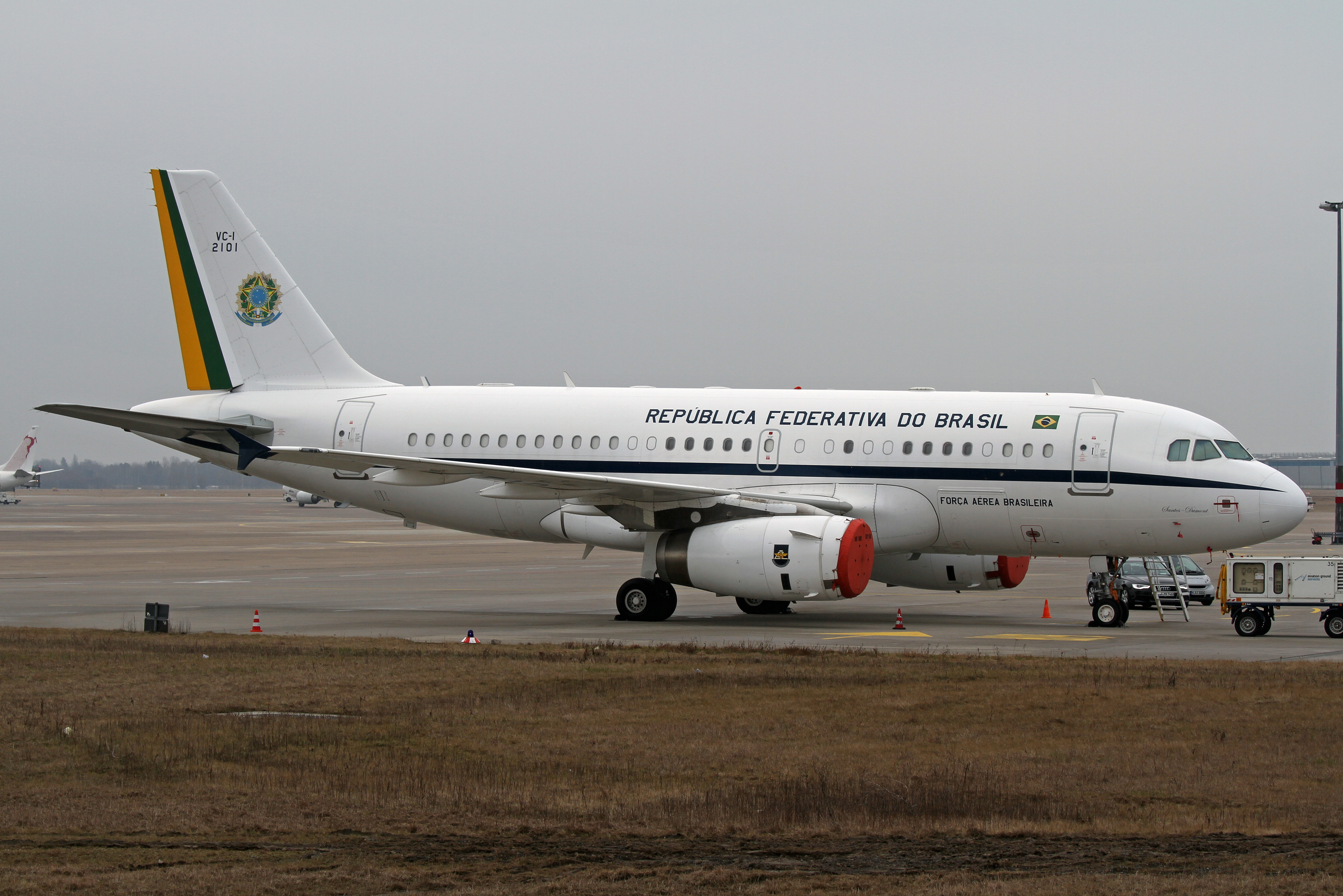
Airbus VC-1 A319 for the Brazilian president.

Italian Air Force designation for the three modified Airbus A319-115 (CJ) used for government transport. The planes fly under the callsign "IAM9001" when transporting the President. All aircraft are operated by the 31st Wing based in Ciampino Air Base, Rome.

VC-1A
A single A319-133X(CJ) served as a VIP transport for the president of Brazil. Known by its call sign Brazilian Air Force One, the aircraft was delivered in 2005. The Brazilian government began looking for a replacement for the VC-1A in 2024 after an engine issue in Mexico forced President Luiz Inácio Lula da Silva to return to Brazil on a different aircraft.
B.L.15
(Thai: บ.ล.๑๕) Royal Thai Armed Forces designation for the A319-115CJ.

=== Future variants ===
==== A319FF ====
A319FF or A319F_{2} (FireFighter) is the tentative designation of the A319ceo converted by and for Neptune Aviation, an American aerial firefighting company based in Montana. On 6 December 2024, Neptune announced they had signed a developmental contract with Aerotec & Concept, a French aerospace engineering company, to jointly design, integrate, and eventually certify a fire retardant/water tank installation on an A319ceo. The new tank will have a payload of 4,500 gallons (approx. 37,500 lb; 17 tons), which is 50% greater than its current platform, the BAe 146-200A. The Airbus will supplement, and eventually replace, the BAe 146, the youngest of which was built in 1991, and the oldest having been built in 1985. It was expected to enter service in spring/summer 2027. However, after a closed-door meeting with employees, it was speculated that the first aircraft purchased (a 2006 A319-112, MSN 2662) may arrive in autumn of 2027. This is due to various ongoing delays involving the airframe, engines and tank design.

== Operators ==
As of October 2025, 1,264 Airbus A319 aircraft (1,229 ceo+35 neo) were in service with 87 operators, with American Airlines, EasyJet, United Airlines and Delta Air Lines operating the largest A319 fleets of 133, 88, 83 and 57 aircraft respectively. The A319 is the most popular variant of the Airbus A320 family to be operated by governments and as executive and private jets, with 78 aircraft (71 ceo+7 neo) in operation in these capacities as of 2025.

=== Orders and deliveries ===
| | Orders | | Deliveries | | | | | | | | | | |
| Type | Total | Backlog | Total | 2025 | 2024 | 2023 | 2022 | 2021 | 2020 | 2019 | 2018 | 2017 | 2016 |
|---|---|---|---|---|---|---|---|---|---|---|---|---|---|
| A319ceo | 1,486 | 2 | 1,484 | — | — | — | — | 2 | 3 | 4 | 8 | 3 | 4 |
| A319neo | 57 | 25 | 32 | 6 | 9 | 7 | 6 | 2 | — | 2 | — | — | — |
| (A319) | (1,543) | (27) | (1,516) | (6) | (9) | (7) | (6) | (4) | (3) | (6) | (8) | (3) | (4) |

Deliveries
| Type | 2015 | 2014 | 2013 | 2012 | 2011 | 2010 | 2009 | 2008 | 2007 | 2006 | 2005 | 2004 | 2003 | 2002 | 2001 | 2000 | 1999 | 1998 | 1997 | 1996 |
|---|---|---|---|---|---|---|---|---|---|---|---|---|---|---|---|---|---|---|---|---|
| A319ceo | 24 | 34 | 38 | 38 | 47 | 51 | 88 | 98 | 105 | 137 | 142 | 87 | 72 | 85 | 89 | 112 | 88 | 53 | 47 | 18 |
| A319neo | — | — | — | — | — | — | — | — | — | — | — | — | — | — | — | — | — | — | — | — |
| (A319) | (24) | (34) | (38) | (38) | (47) | (51) | (88) | (98) | (105) | (137) | (142) | (87) | (72) | (85) | (89) | (112) | (88) | (53) | (47) | (18) |

Data as of May 2025.

== Accidents and incidents ==
As of May 2022, there have been 23 aviation accidents and incidents involving the Airbus A319, including five hull-loss accidents. No fatal accidents have been recorded involving the aircraft type.

== Preserved aircraft ==
| Photograph | Registration | Model | Build date | First flight | Last flight | Operator | Location | Status | Notes | Refs. |
|---|---|---|---|---|---|---|---|---|---|---|
| | I-EEZQ | A319-112 | 1996 | 26 April, 1996 | September 2011 | Swissair; Swiss; Mexicana; Wilmington Trust Company; Celestair; Air Burkina; Air Ivoire; Meridiana Fly | Kirklees College, Huddersfield, West Yorkshire, England | On static display | Named "Bachenbülach" by Swissair. Named "Vancouver" by Mexicana. Preserved as a Cabin Trainer. | |
| | 5N-FND | A319-113 | 1997 | 13 January 1997 | 17 August, 2016 | Air Inter Europe; Air France; Wind Jet; First Nation Airways | Supreme Continental Hotels and Resort, Ilora, Oyo, Oyo State, Nigeria | On static display | Named "Endurance" by First Nation Airways. Preserved as a restaurant. | |
| | CS-TTE | A319-111 | 1998 | 23 April, 1998 | 24 November, 2020 | TAP Air Portugal | Cardington Studios, Cardington, Bedfordshire, United Kingdom | On static display | Named "Francisco d’Ollanda". Preserved as a prop at Cardington Studios. | |

== Specifications ==
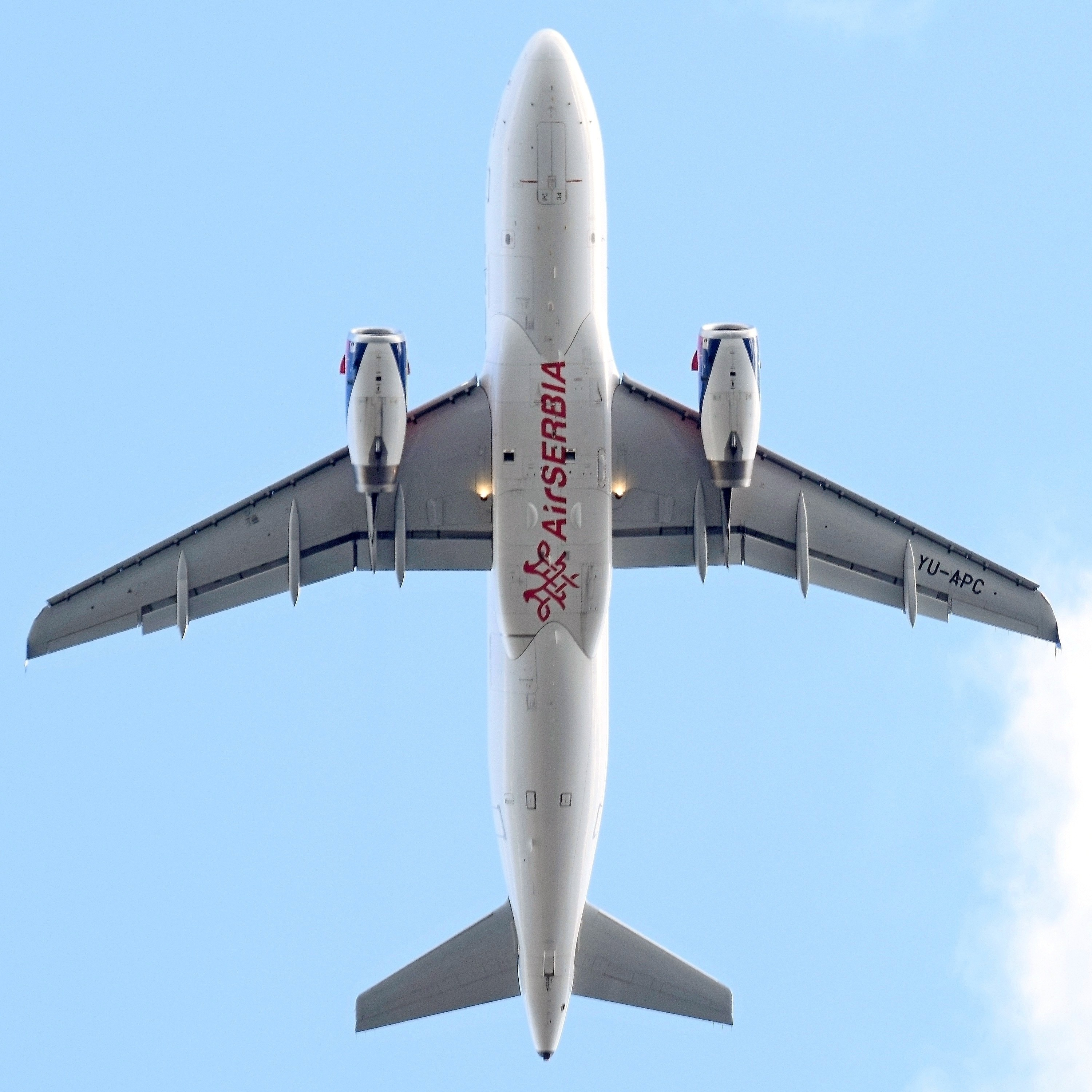
Planform view of an Airbus A319-100

Airbus A319
| Cockpit crew | Two |
| Exit limit | 160 / 150 |
| 1-class max. seating | 156 at 71–76 cm (28–30 in) pitch |
| 1-class, typical | 134 at 81 cm (32 in) pitch |
| 2-class, typical | 124 (8F @ 38 in, 116Y @ 32 in) |
| Cargo capacity | 27.7 m^{3} (980 cu ft) |
| Unit load devices | 4× LD3-45 |
| Length | 33.84 m (111 ft 0 in) |
| Wheelbase | 11.04 m (36 ft 3 in) |
| Track | 7.59 m (24 ft 11 in) |
| Wingspan | 35.8 m (117 ft 5 in) (Note: with sharklets) |
| Wing area | 122.4 m^{2} (1,318 sq ft) |
| Wing sweepback | 25 degrees |
| Tail height | 11.76 m (38 ft 7 in) |
| Cabin width | 3.70 m (12 ft 2 in) |
| Fuselage width | 3.95 m (13 ft 0 in) |
| Fuselage height | 4.14 m (13 ft 7 in) |
| Operating empty weight (OEW) | 40.8 t (90,000 lb) |
| Maximum zero-fuel weight (MZFW) | 58.5 t (129,000 lb) |
| Maximum landing weight (MLW) | 62.5 t (138,000 lb) |
| Maximum takeoff weight (MTOW) | 75.5 t (166,000 lb) |
| Cruising speed | Mach 0.78 (829 km/h; 515 mph; 448 kn) |
| Maximum speed | Mach 0.82 (872 km/h; 542 mph; 471 kn) |
| Range, typical payload (Note: Passengers and bags) | 3,750 nmi (6,940 km; 4,320 mi) |
| ACJ range | 6,000 nmi (11,100 km; 6,900 mi) |
| Takeoff (MTOW, SL, ISA) | 1,850 m (6,070 ft) |
| Landing (MLW, SL, ISA) | 1,360 m (4,460 ft) |
| Fuel capacity | 24,210–30,190 L (6,400–7,980 US gal; 5,330–6,640 imp gal) |
| Service ceiling | 39,100–41,000 ft (11,900–12,500 m) |
| Engines (×2) | CFM56-5, 68.3 in (1.73 m) fan IAE V2500-A5, 63.5 in (1.61 m) fan |
| Thrust (×2) | 98–120 kN (22,000–27,000 lb_{f}) |

=== Engines ===
| Aircraft Model | Certification Date | Engines |
|---|---|---|
| A319-111 | 10 April 1996 | CFM56-5B5 |
| A319-112 | 10 April 1996 | CFM56-5B6 |
| A319-113 | 31 May 1996 | CFM56-5A4 |
| A319-114 | 31 May 1996 | CFM56-5A5 |
| A319-115 | 30 July 1999 | CFM56-5B7 |
| A319-131 | 18 December 1996 | IAE V2522-A5 |
| A319-132 | 18 December 1996 | IAE V2524-A5 |
| A319-133 | 30 July 1999 | IAE V2527M-A5 |

== See also ==
- Airbus Corporate Jets

Related development

- Airbus A318
- Airbus A320 family

Aircraft of comparable role, configuration, and era

- Boeing 717
- Boeing 737-300
- Boeing 737-700
- Bombardier CSeries
- Comac C919
- Irkut MC-21
- Tupolev Tu-204

Related lists

- List of Airbus A320 operators
- List of jet airliners
- Lists of airlines

== Sources ==
- Eden, Paul E., ed. (2008). Civil Aircraft Today. London: Amber Books. ISBN 978-1-905704-86-6.
- Gunston, Bill (2009). Airbus: The Complete Story. Sparkford, Yeovil, Somerset, UK: Haynes Publishing. ISBN 978-1-84425-585-6.
- Norris, Guy; Wagner, Mark (1999). Airbus. St. Paul, Minnesota: MBI Publishing. ISBN 978-0-7603-0677-2.
