= Empty weight =

The empty weight of plane is based on its weight without any payload (cargo, passengers, usable fuel, etc.).

== Standards ==
Many different empty weight definitions exist. Here are some of the more common ones used.

=== GAMA standardization ===
In 1975 (or 1976 per FAA-H-8083-1B) the General Aviation Manufacturers Association (GAMA) standardized the definition of empty weight terms for Pilot Operating Handbooks as follows:

	Standard Empty Weight
+	Optional Equipment
	Basic Empty Weight

Standard Empty Weight includes the following:

- Empty weight of the airplane
- Full Hydraulic Fluid
- Unusable Fuel
- Full Oil

Optional Equipment includes the following:

- All equipment installed beyond standard

=== Non-GAMA usage ===
Previously (Regarding aircraft certified under CAR Part 3) the following were commonly used to define empty weights:

	Empty Weight
+	Unusable Fuel
	Standard Empty Weight

	Standard Empty Weight
+	Optional Equipment
	Licensed Empty Weight

In this definition Empty Weight includes the following:

- Empty weight of the airplane
- Undrainable Oil
- Full Hydraulic Fluid

Note that weight of oil must be added to Licensed Empty Weight for it to be equivalent to Basic Empty Weight

== See also ==
- Zero Fuel Weight
- Maximum Takeoff Weight
- Tare weight
