= Bombardier CRJ =

Bombardier CRJ series

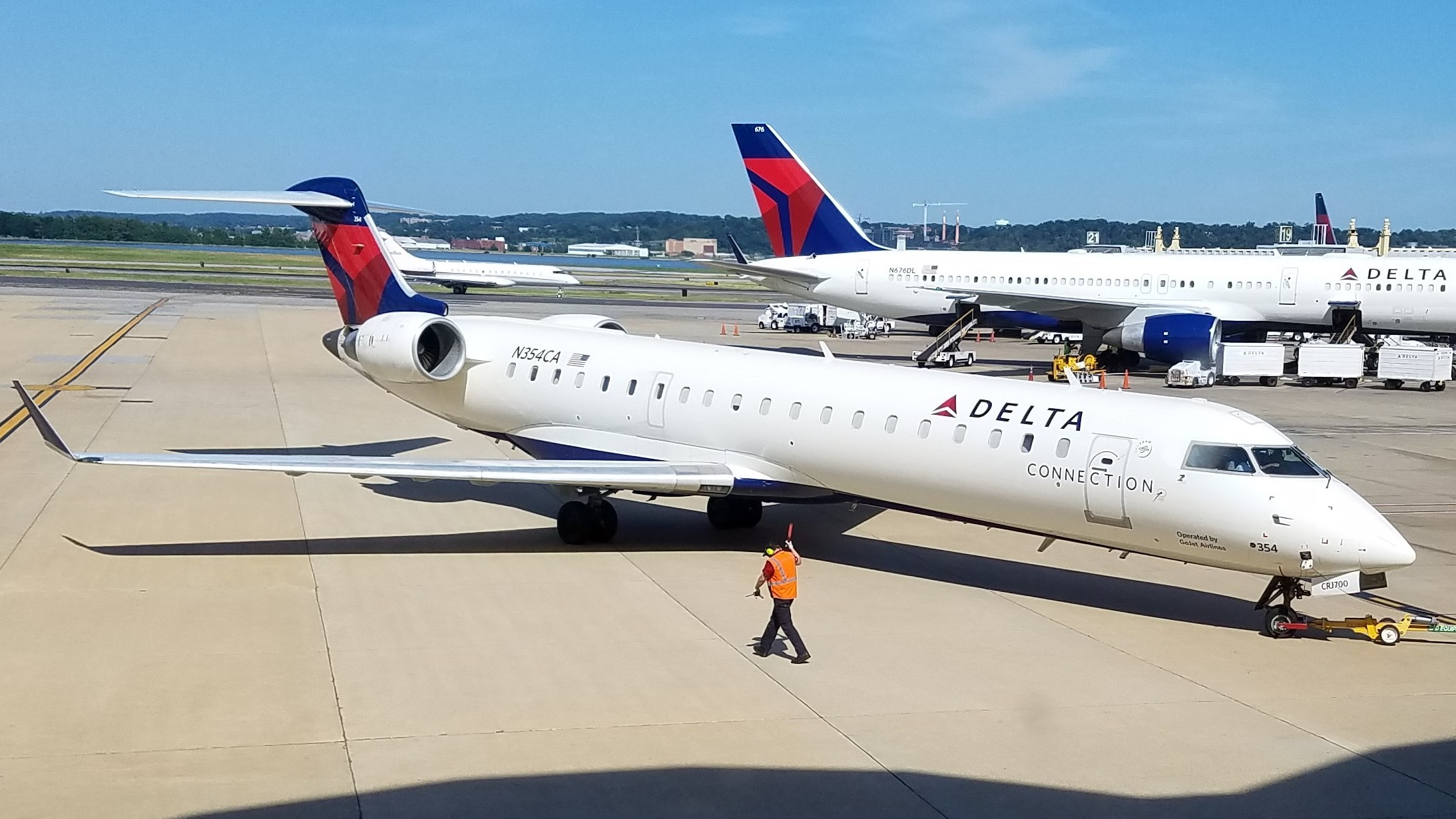
- A Delta Connection Bombardier CRJ-700 (N354CA)

General information
- Type: Regional jet
- National origin: Canada
- Manufacturer: Bombardier Aviation
- Status: In service
- Primary users: SkyWest Airlines Endeavor Air; PSA Airlines; GoJet Airlines
- Number built: 1,945

History
- Manufactured: 1991–2020
- Introduction date: 19 October 1992 with Lufthansa CityLine
- First flight: 10 May 1991
- Developed from: Bombardier Challenger 600 series
- Variants: Bombardier CRJ100/200; Bombardier CRJ700 series

The Bombardier CRJ/Mitsubishi CRJ or CRJ Series (for Canadair Regional Jet) is a family of regional jets introduced in 1991 by Bombardier Aerospace. The CRJ was manufactured by Bombardier Aerospace with the manufacturing of the first CRJ generation, the CRJ100/200 starting in 1991 and the second CRJ generation, the CRJ700 series starting in 1999.

The CRJ programme was acquired by Japanese corporation Mitsubishi Heavy Industries (MHI RJ Aviation Group) in a deal that closed 1 June 2020. Bombardier subsequently completed the assembly of the order backlog on behalf of Mitsubishi.

Bombardier claims it is the most successful family of regional jets in the world. Production ended in December 2020 after 1,945 were built.

In April 2026, Aviation Week Fleet Discovery lists about 1,300 CRJs in the global fleet, with about a third of them are built as CRJ-200s.

With the exception of life-extension maintenance programmes, CRJ200s and CRJ700s can operate for 80,000 cycles, while CRJ900s and CRJ1000s have 60,000-cycle limits.

== Background ==
The family consists of the following aircraft generations and models/derivatives:

- CRJ100/200
  - CRJ100 – maximum of 50 passenger seats
  - CRJ200 – maximum of 50 passenger seats, improved CF34-3B1 engine
    - CRJ440 – CRJ200 limited to 44 passenger seats
    - CRJ450 - CRJ200 limited to 41 passenger seats
- CRJ700 series
  - CRJ700 – maximum of 78 passenger seats
    - CRJ550 – CRJ700 limited to 50 passenger seats
  - CRJ900 – maximum of 90 passenger seats
    - CRJ705 – CRJ900 limited to 75 passenger seats
  - CRJ1000 – maximum of 104 passenger seats

== Divestment ==
As of November 2018, following Bombardier's decisions to sell the CSeries to Airbus and the Q Series to De Havilland Canada, the company was looking at "strategic options" to return the CRJ to profitability. Analysts suspected that it might decide to exit the commercial aircraft market altogether and refocus on business aircraft. That prediction came to pass on June 25, 2019, when a deal was announced to sell the CRJ programme to Mitsubishi Heavy Industries, the parent company of Mitsubishi Aircraft Corporation. Mitsubishi had a historic interest in the CRJ programme, having sounded out risk-sharing options with Bombardier, and were at one point expected to take a stake in its SpaceJet venture during the 1990s. Bombardier ceased new sales and announced that production of the CRJ would continue at Mirabel until the current order backlog was complete. The deal was to include the type certificate for the CRJ series; Bombardier worked with Transport Canada to separate the CRJ certificate from that of the Challenger.

Closure of the deal was confirmed on June 1, 2020, with Bombardier's service and support activities transferred to a new Montreal-based company, MHI RJ Aviation Group. MHI RJ has not renamed the aircraft, and its website referred simply to the CRJ Series.

The final Bombardier CRJ to be produced, a CRJ900, finished production and was delivered to SkyWest Airlines on February 28, 2021.

In 2021, Mitsubishi investigated restarting production on the CRJ550, a variant of the CRJ700 limited to 50 passenger seats, similar to the nominal seating capacity of the 100/200 models. Restarting production would involve building a new plant, as the former plant is now making Airbus A220s, and taking the tooling out of storage. However, as of March 2024, Mitsubishi has not pursued a restart.

== Specifications ==
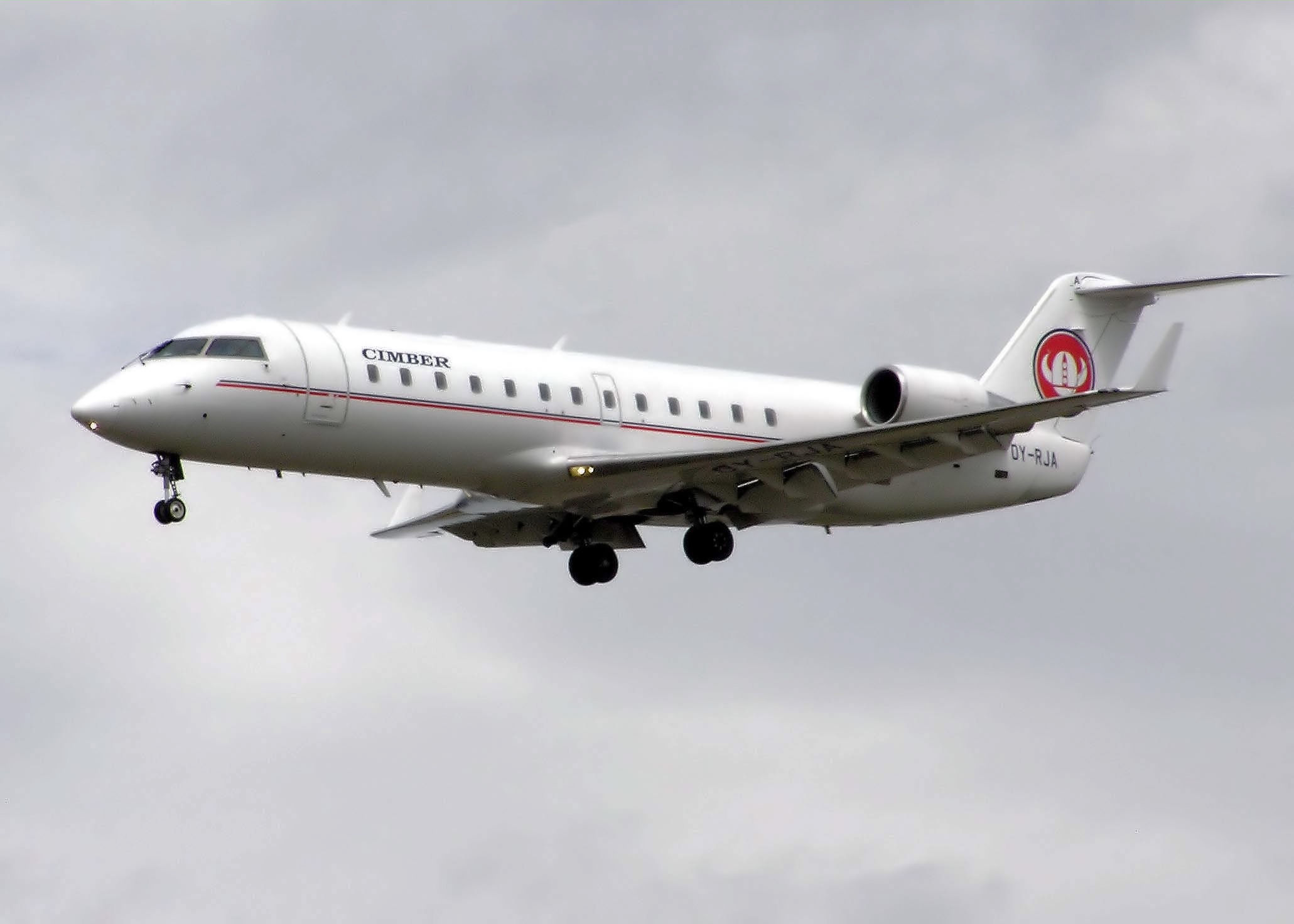
Cimber Air CRJ-200

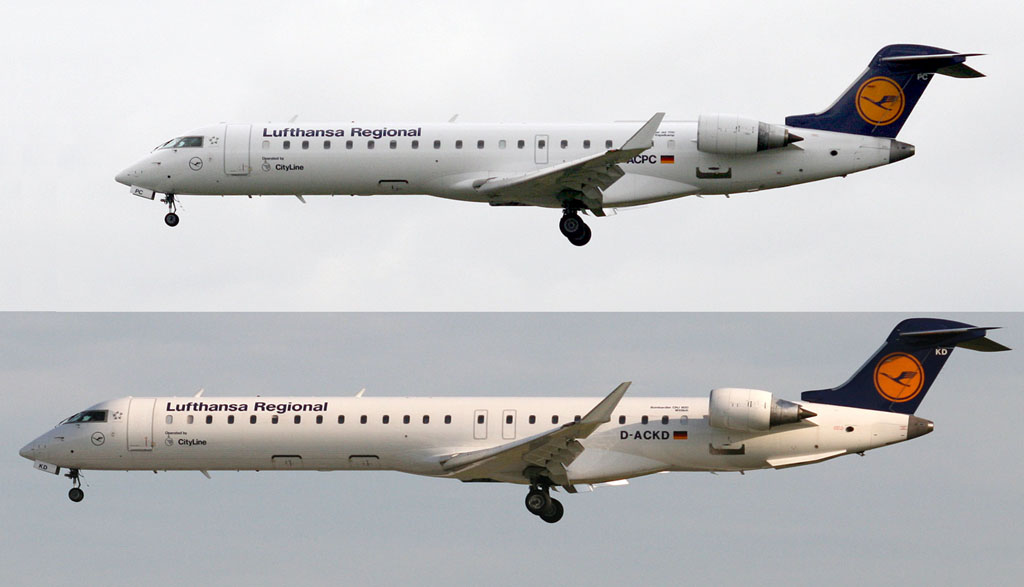
CRJ-700 (top) and CRJ-900 (bottom)

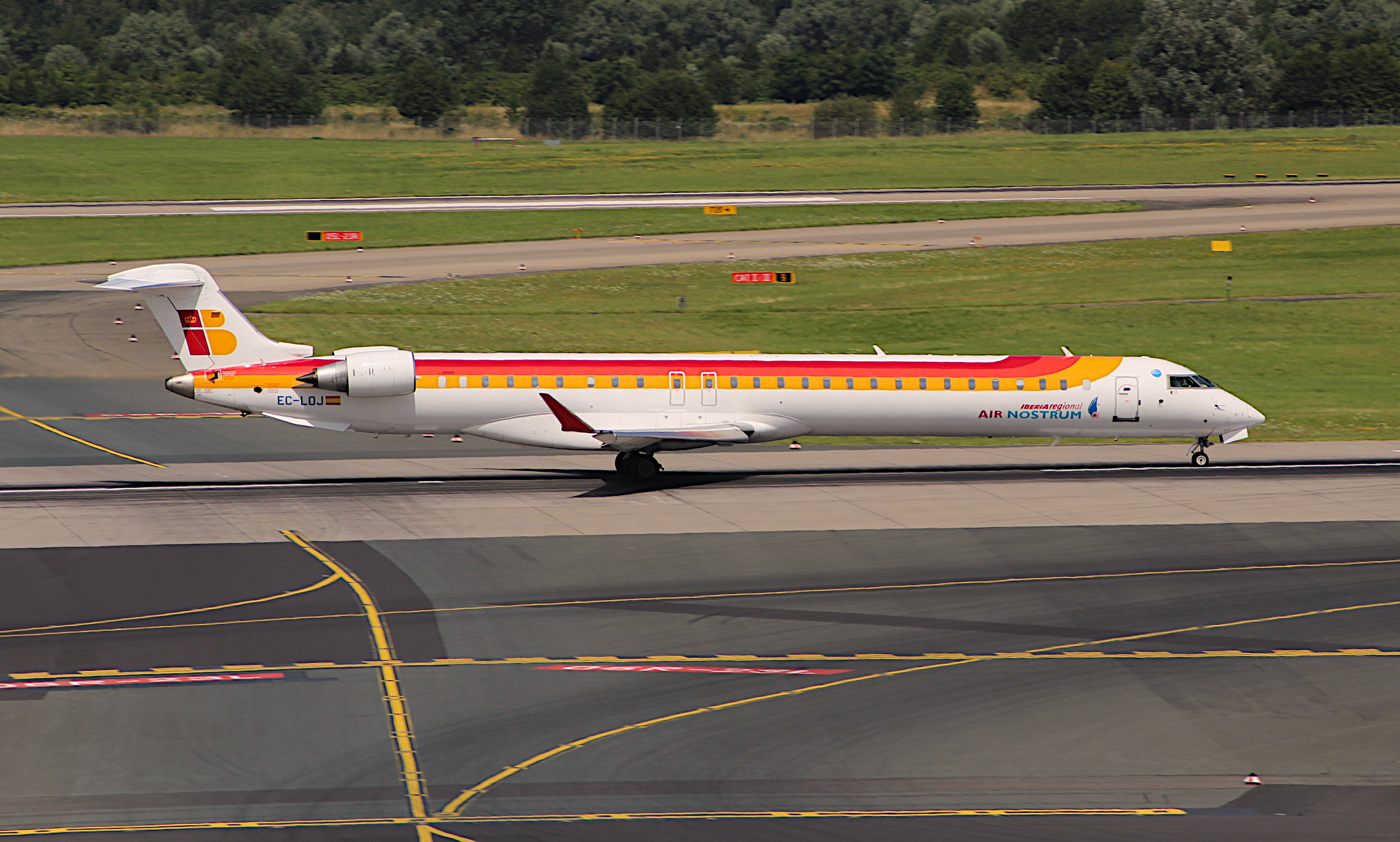
Air Nostrum CRJ-1000

CRJ Family Characteristics
Variant	CRJ100	CRJ200	CRJ700	CRJ900	CRJ1000
Cockpit crew	Two				
Max. seating	50		78	90	104
Length	87 ft 10 in (26.77 m)		106 ft 1 in (32.3 m)	118 ft 11 in (36.2 m)	128 ft 5 in (39.1 m)
Height	20 ft 8 in (6.3 m)		24 ft 10 in (7.6 m)	24 ft 7 in (7.5 m)	
Wingspan	69 ft 6 in (21.21 m)		76 ft 3 in (23.2 m)	81 ft 7 in (24.9 m)	85 ft 11 in (26.2 m)
Wing area	520.4 sq ft (48.35 m^{2})		760 sq ft (70.6 m^{2})	765 sq ft (71.1 m^{2})	833 sq ft (77.4 m^{2})
Fuselage diameter	8 ft 10 in (2.69 m)				
Maximum takeoff weight	51,000–53,000 lb (23,133–24,041 kg)		75,000 lb (34,019 kg)	84,500 lb (38,330 kg)	91,800 lb (41,640 kg)
Operating empty weight	30,500 lb (13,835 kg)		44,245 lb (20,069 kg)	48,160 lb (21,845 kg)	51,120 lb (23,188 kg)
Max. payload	13,500 lb (6,124 kg)		18,055 lb (8,190 kg)	22,590 lb (10,247 kg)	26,380 lb (11,966 kg)
Max fuel	2,135 US gal (8,081 L); 14,305 lb (6,489 kg)		2,925 US gal (11,070 L); 19,595 lb (8,888 kg)		2,903 US gal (10,990 L); 19,450 lb (8,822 kg)
Engines (2x)	GE CF34-3A1	GE CF34-3B1	GE CF34-8C5B1	GE CF34-8C5	GE CF34-8C5A1
Takeoff thrust (2x)	8,729 lbf (38.84 kN)		13,790 lbf (61.3 kN)	14,510 lbf (64.5 kN)	
Cruise	Mach .74 – Mach .81 (424–465 kn; 786–860 km/h; 488–535 mph)		Mach .78 – Mach .825 (447–473.2 kn; 829–876.4 km/h; 515–544.6 mph)		
Range	1,305–1,700 nmi (2,417–3,148 km; 1,502–1,956 mi)		1,400 nmi (2,593 km; 1,600 mi)	1,550 nmi (2,871 km; 1,780 mi)	1,650 nmi (3,056 km; 1,900 mi)
Ceiling	41,000 ft (12,496 m)				
Takeoff (SL, ISA, MTOW)	5,800–6,290 ft (1,770–1,920 m)		5,265 ft (1,605 m)	5,820 ft (1,770 m)	6,670 ft (2,030 m)
Landing (SL, MLW)	4,850 ft (1,480 m)		5,040 ft (1,540 m)	5,360 ft (1,630 m)	5,740 ft (1,750 m)
ICAO type	CRJ1	CRJ2	CRJ7	CRJ9	CRJX
