= Maximum ramp weight =

Maximum weight authorised for manoeuvring an aircraft

The maximum ramp weight (MRW) (also known as the maximum taxi weight (MTW)) is the maximum weight authorised for manoeuvring (taxiing or towing) an aircraft on the ground as limited by aircraft strength and airworthiness requirements. It includes the weight of taxi and run-up fuel for the engines and the auxiliary power unit (APU).

It is greater than the maximum takeoff weight due to the fuel that will be burned during the taxi and run-up operations.

The difference between the maximum taxi/ramp weight and the maximum take-off weight (maximum taxi fuel allowance) depends on the size of the aircraft, the number of engines, APU operation, and engines/APU fuel consumption, and is typically assumed for 10 to 15 minutes allowance of taxi and run-up operations.

== See also ==
- Aircraft gross weight
- Maximum takeoff weight (MTOW)
- Maximum landing weight (MLW)
- Maximum zero-fuel weight (MZFW)
- Manufacturer's empty weight (MEW)
