= Delta Air Lines Flight 89 =

2020 aviation incident over California

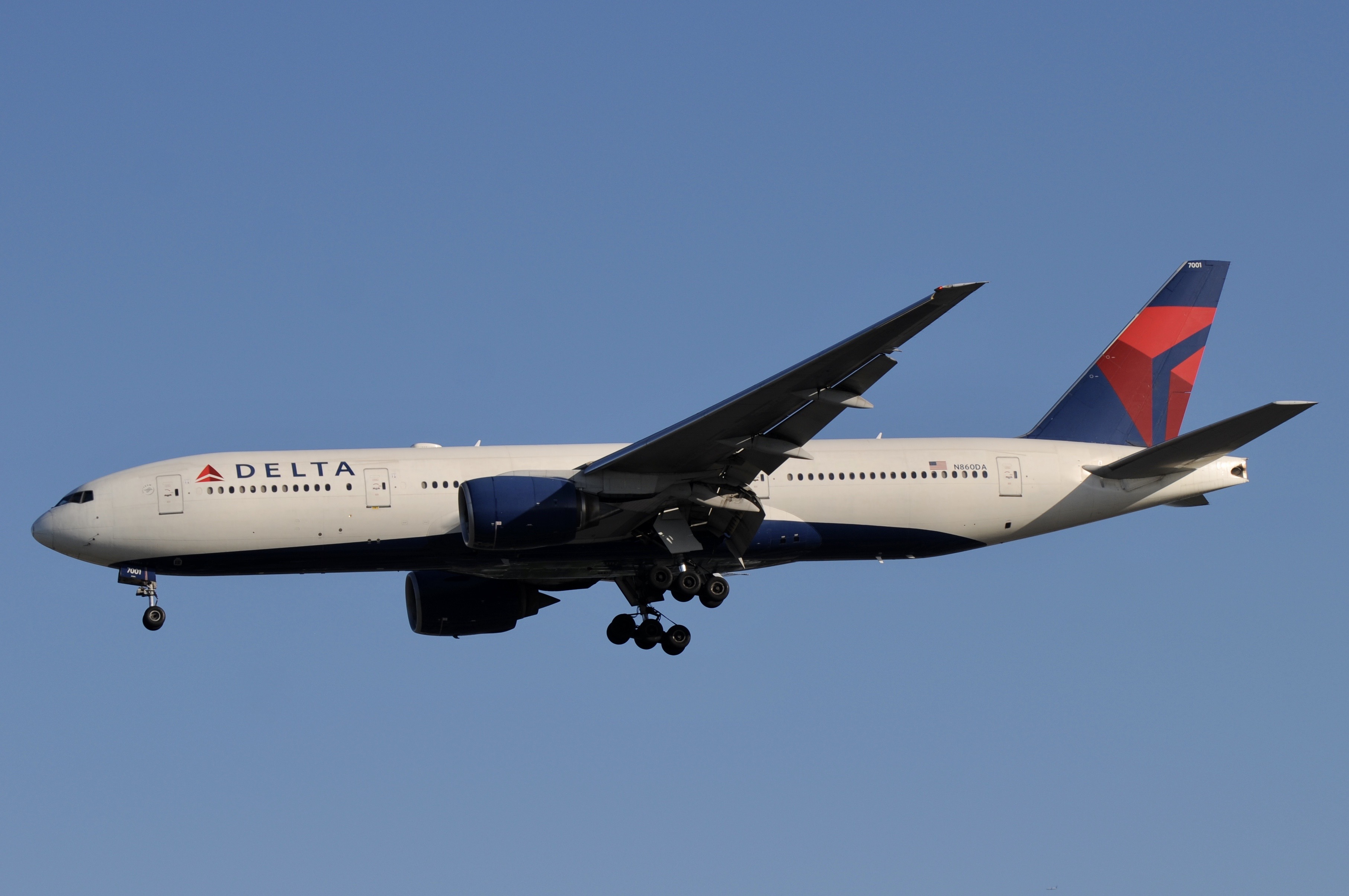
- N860DA, the aircraft involved in the incident, seen in 2017

Incident
- Date: January 14, 2020
- Summary: Compressor stall, subsequent fuel dumping
- Site: South Los Angeles, California, United States; 33.96°N 118.173°W
- Total injuries: 56

Aircraft
- Aircraft type: Boeing 777-232ER
- Operator: Delta Air Lines
- IATA flight No.: DL89
- ICAO flight No.: DAL89
- Call sign: DELTA 89
- Registration: N860DA
- Flight origin: Los Angeles International Airport
- Destination: Shanghai Pudong International Airport
- Occupants: 165
- Passengers: 149
- Crew: 16
- Fatalities: 0
- Survivors: 165

Ground casualties
- Ground injuries: 56 (sickness caused by exposure to fuel)

Delta Air Lines Flight 89 was a scheduled international flight from Los Angeles International Airport to Shanghai Pudong International Airport. On January 14, 2020, the Boeing 777-232ER conducting the flight had engine problems shortly after takeoff; while returning to the origin airport for an emergency landing, it dumped fuel over populated areas adjacent to the city of Los Angeles, resulting in skin and lung irritation in at least 56 people on the ground and triggering a Federal Aviation Administration (FAA) investigation. The aircraft landed safely with no injuries to passengers or crew.

== Background ==
=== Aircraft ===
The aircraft involved was a Boeing 777-232ER, with serial number 29951 and registered as N860DA. It was manufactured by Boeing Commercial Airplanes in 1999 and was powered by two Rolls-Royce Trent 892 engines each producing about 92,000 pounds-force (410 kN) of thrust.

=== Flight ===
Flight 89 was a regularly scheduled Delta Air Lines flight from LAX to Shanghai Pudong International Airport. On January 14, 2020, the Boeing 777-200ER widebody jet aircraft operating as Flight 89 departed from LAX at 11:32 a.m. The aircraft had 149 passengers and 16 crew members on board.

To reach Shanghai, the aircraft would be carrying enough fuel to exceed its certified maximum landing weight, increasing its landing distance and risking structural damage if fuel was not dumped. However, according to retired 777 pilot and CNN aviation analyst Les Abend, many runways at major airports can safely accommodate a landing by an overweight 777 in dry conditions.

== Incident ==
Minutes after departing LAX and initiating a climb over the Pacific Ocean, the pilots reported a compressor stall in the aircraft's right Rolls-Royce Trent 892 engine. Air traffic controllers asked Flight 89's pilots if they wanted to remain over the ocean to dump fuel, but the pilots declined, saying "we've got it under control... we're not critical." Controllers again asked, "OK, so you don't need to hold or dump fuel or anything like that?", to which the pilots responded, "Negative." The pilots requested Runway 25R, the longest runway at the airport. Flight 89 turned back towards land and headed towards LAX to make an emergency landing.

While over land and approaching LAX for an emergency landing, the plane dumped fuel over a five-mile portion of the Los Angeles county area, including five elementary schools and a high school. The most affected area was Park Avenue Elementary School in Cudahy, where several students were doused with jet fuel. Students at elementary schools in South Gate were also affected. Children who were in a physical education class thought it was rain before seeing the plane above them. CBS News reported that, based on the expert opinion of a former Boeing 777 captain, Flight 89 would have likely dumped 15,000–20,000 US gallons (12,000–17,000 imp gal; 57–76 m^{3}) of fuel. Shortly after completing the fuel dump, the aircraft landed safely.

== Aftermath ==
First responders were called to multiple schools to treat children and staff who were outdoors at the time Flight 89 dumped fuel. At least 56 children and adults were reported to have minor skin and lung irritations. All affected schools were closed for cleaning, but reopened the following day.

The story received widespread media attention, with detailed investigation and analysis from organizations including CBS News, The New York Times, the Los Angeles Times, and received substantial international media coverage. Aviation experts were puzzled by the actions of the flight crew. A former United Airlines captain called the fuel dump over a populated area "a pretty outrageous thing" that "nobody" would do. Safety expert John Cox said that because "they were not in an immediate threat condition, and they started out over water", the pilots will need to explain "why they continued to dump fuel at low altitude when they weren't in a fuel-dumping area, and didn't advise ATC that they were dumping fuel". Abend noted that the pilots twice told controllers that they needed to delay the landing for unexplained reasons, suggesting that they needed more time to complete checklists and dump fuel, and did not feel compelled to land right away. However—trying to surmise why the pilots did not use the extra time to explain their intentions, nor to ask for vectors to a dumping area over the ocean—Abend stated "Honestly, I don't have the answer."

Following the Flight 89 incident, the mayor of Burien, Washington, a city located adjacent to Seattle–Tacoma International Airport, called on the Port of Seattle to develop an emergency response plan for similar situations.

On August 25, 2025, Delta agreed to pay $78.75 million in a class action lawsuit filed by residents affected by the fuel dump.

== Investigation ==
On January 15, 2020, the FAA announced it was investigating the Flight 89 incident. In a statement, the FAA noted that "There are special fuel-dumping procedures for aircraft operating into and out of any major U.S. airport", and that "procedures call for fuel to be dumped over designated unpopulated areas, typically at higher altitudes so the fuel atomizes and disperses before it reaches the ground".
