= Aircraft gross weight =

Total aircraft weight during flight or ground operation

The aircraft gross weight (also known as the all-up weight and abbreviated AUW) is the total aircraft weight at any moment during the flight or ground operation.

An aircraft's gross weight will decrease during a flight due to fuel and oil consumption. An aircraft's gross weight may also vary during a flight due to payload dropping or in-flight refuelling.

At the moment of releasing its brakes, the gross weight of an aircraft is equal to its takeoff weight. During flight, an aircraft's gross weight is referred to as the en-route weight or in-flight weight.

== Design weight limits (structural design weights) ==
An aircraft's gross weight is limited by several weight restrictions in order to avoid overloading its structure or to avoid unacceptable performance or handling qualities while in operation.

Aircraft gross weight limits are established during an aircraft's design and certification period and are laid down in the aircraft's type certificate and manufacturer specification documents.

The absolute maximum weight capabilities of a given aircraft are referred to as the structural weight limits. The structural weight limits are based on aircraft maximum structural capability and define the envelope for the CG charts (both maximum weight and CG limits).

An aircraft's structural weight capability is typically a function of when the aircraft was manufactured, and in some cases, old aircraft can have their structural weight capability increased by structural modifications.

=== Maximum design taxi weight (MDTW) ===
The maximum design taxi weight (also known as the maximum design ramp weight (MDRW)) is the maximum weight certificated for aircraft manoeuvring on the ground (taxiing or towing) as limited by aircraft strength and airworthiness requirements.

=== Maximum design takeoff weight (MDTOW) ===
Is the maximum certificated design weight when the brakes are released for takeoff and is the greatest weight for which compliance with the relevant structural and engineering requirements has been demonstrated by the manufacturer.

=== Maximum design landing weight (MDLW) ===
The maximum certificated design weight at which the aircraft meets the appropriate landing certification requirements. It generally depends on the landing gear strength or the landing impact loads on certain parts of the wing structure.

The MDLW must not exceed the MDTOW.

The maximum landing weight is typically designed for 10 feet per second (600 feet per minute) sink rate at touch down with no structural damage.

=== Maximum design zero-fuel weight (MDZFW) ===
The maximum certificated design weight of the aircraft less all usable fuel and other specified usable agents (engine injection fluid, and other consumable propulsion agents). It is the maximum weight permitted before usable fuel and other specified usable fluids are loaded in specified sections of the airplane. The MDZFW is limited by strength and airworthiness requirements. At this weight, the subsequent addition of fuel will not result in the aircraft design strength being exceeded. The weight difference between the MDTOW and the MDZFW may be utilised only for the addition of fuel.

=== Minimum and maximum flight weight (MFW) ===
Minimum flight weight is usually limited by either the practicality (operating empty weight plus weight of the crew and minimal amount of fuel) or handling considerations (frequently related to the balance).

Maximum flight weight is limited by aircraft strength and airworthiness requirements. Maximum flight weight is also known as maximum in-flight weight, maximum en route weight. Typically it is the same as the maximum takeoff weight (notable exception is due to inflight refueling).

== Authorised weight limits ==
Aircraft authorised gross weight limits (also referred to as certified weight limits) are laid down in the aircraft flight manuals (AFM) and/or associated certificate of airworthiness (C of A). The authorised or permitted limits may be equal to or lower than the structural design weight limits.

The authorised weight limits that can legally be used by an operator or airline are those listed in the AFM and the weight and balance manual.

The authorised (or certified) weight limits are chosen by the customer/airline and they are referred to as the "purchased weights". An operator may purchase a certified weight below the maximum design weights because many of the airport operating fees are based on the aircraft AFM maximum allowable weight values. An aircraft purchase price is, typically, a function of the certified weight purchased.

Maximum weights established, for each aircraft, by design and certification must not be exceeded during aircraft operation (ramp or taxying, takeoff, en-route flight, approach, and landing) and during aircraft loading (zero fuel conditions, centre of gravity position, and weight distribution).

Weights could be restricted on some type of aircraft depending on the aircraft handling requirements; for example aerobatic aircraft, where certain aerobatic manoeuvres can only be executed with a limited gross weight.

In addition, the authorised maximum weight limits may be less as limited by centre of gravity, fuel density, and fuel loading limits.

=== Maximum taxi weight (MTW) ===
The maximum taxi weight (MTW) (also known as the maximum ramp weight (MRW) is the maximum weight authorized for maneuvering (taxiing or towing) an aircraft on the ground as limited by aircraft strength and airworthiness requirements. It includes the weight of taxi and run-up fuel for the engines and the APU.

It is greater than the maximum takeoff weight due to the fuel that will be burned during the taxi and runup operations.

The difference between the maximum taxi/ramp weight and the maximum take-off weight (maximum taxi fuel allowance) depends on the size of the aircraft, the number of engines, APU operation, and engines/APU fuel consumption, and is typically assumed for 10 to 15 minutes allowance of taxi and run-up operations.

=== Maximum takeoff weight (MTOW) ===
The maximum takeoff weight (also known as the maximum brake-release weight) is the maximum weight authorised at brake release for takeoff, or at the start of the takeoff roll.

The maximum takeoff weight is always less than the maximum taxi/ramp weight to allow for fuel burned during taxi by the engines and the APU.

In operation, the maximum weight for takeoff may be limited to values less than the maximum takeoff weight due to aircraft performance, environmental conditions, airfield characteristics (takeoff field length, altitude), maximum tire speed and brake energy, obstacle clearances, and/or en route and landing weight requirements.

=== Maximum landing weight (MLW) ===
The maximum weight authorised for normal landing of an aircraft.

The MLW must not exceed the MTOW.

The operation landing weight may be limited to a weight lower than the Maximum Landing Weight by the most restrictive of the following requirements:

- Aircraft performance requirements for a given altitude and temperature:

landing field length requirements,
approach and landing climb requirements

- Noise requirements

If the flight has been of short duration, fuel may have to be jettisoned to reduce the landing weight.

Overweight landings require a structural inspection or evaluation of the touch-down loads before the next aircraft operation.

=== Maximum zero-fuel weight (MZFW) ===
The maximum permissible weight of the aircraft less all usable fuel and other specified usable agents (engine injection fluid, and other consumable propulsion agents). It is the maximum weight permitted before usable fuel and other specified usable fluids are loaded in specified sections of the airplane.

== See also ==
- Manufacturer's empty weight
- Operating empty weight
- Fuel dumping
- Center of gravity of an aircraft
- Aircraft weight class
