= First Nation Airways =

Airline

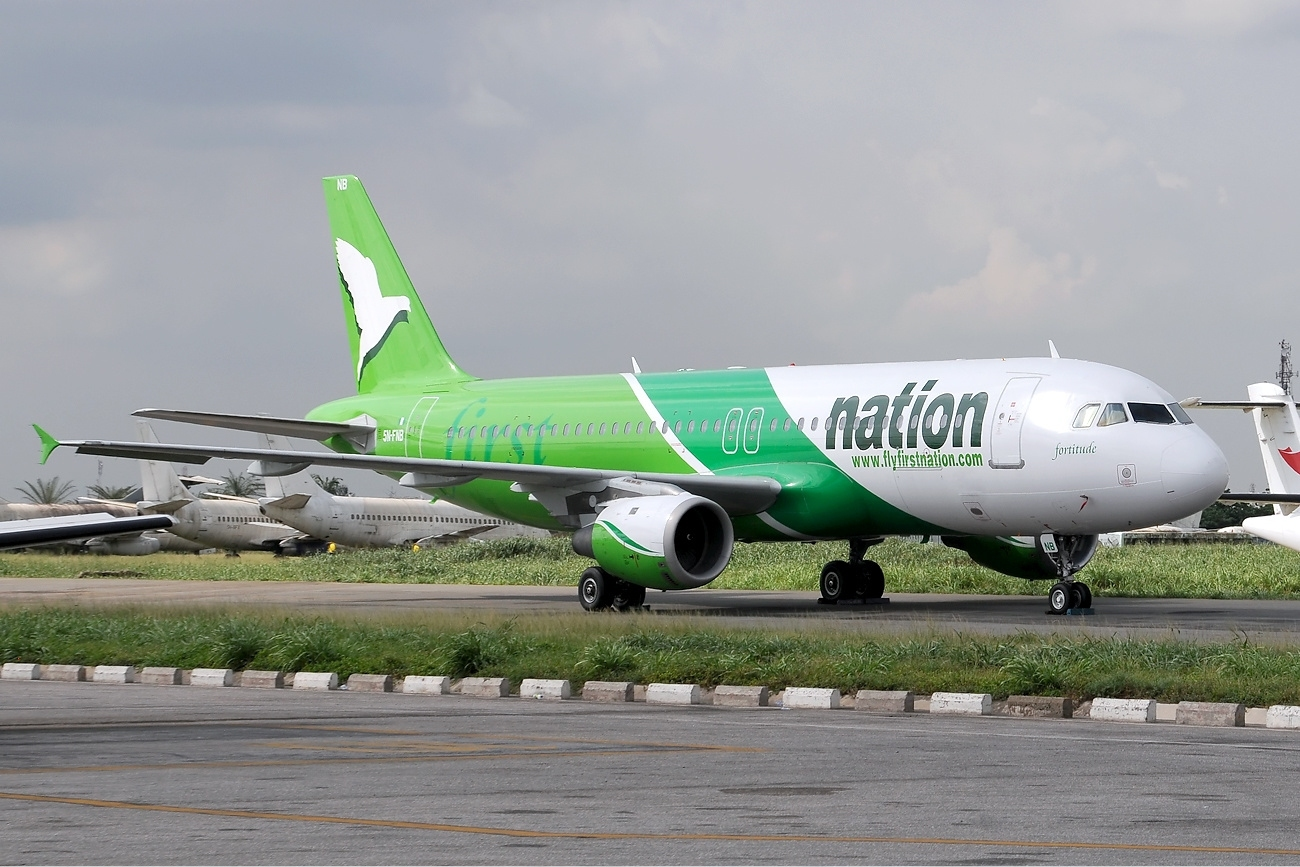
- First Nation Airways Airbus A320-200
| IATA | ICAO | Call sign |
|---|---|---|
| - | FRN | FIRST NATION |
- Founded: 2010
- Commenced operations: 2011
- Ceased operations: 2018
- Hubs: Murtala Mohammed Airport
- Frequent-flyer program: Green club
- Fleet size: 0
- Destinations: 0
- Headquarters: Lagos, Nigeria
- Website: flyfirstnation.com

First Nation Airways Ltd. was a Nigerian airline with its headquarters in Lagos and base at Murtala Mohammed Airport.

== History ==
First Nation Airways (SS) Limited is a privately owned, passenger airline. It commenced daily flights to Nnamdi Azikiwe International Airport in October 2013 and planned an additional aircraft expansion in 2019 to 2020. In May 2018 however, the Nigerian authorities suspended the airlines operations as her two aircraft were ferried out on maintenance check . As of June 2019, the airline did not resume any flights as they are still undergoing re-certification process .

== Destinations ==
First Nation Airways served the following destinations:

- Abuja - Nnamdi Azikiwe International Airport
- Lagos - Murtala Mohammed International Airport base
- Port Harcourt - Port Harcourt International Airport

== Fleet ==
The First Nation Airways fleet consisted of the following aircraft (As of August 2018):

In September 2020, One of First Nation's A319, with registration 5N-FNE was scrapped.

First Nation Airways Fleet
| Aircraft | In Fleet | Orders | Passengers |
|---|---|---|---|
| Airbus A319-100 | 2 | | 126 |
| Total | 2 | | |

=== Former fleet ===
The airline previously operated the following aircraft:

- 3 Airbus A320-200 (2011-2012)
