= MJET =

Charter airline of Austria

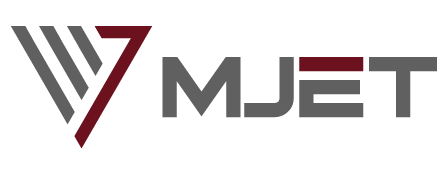

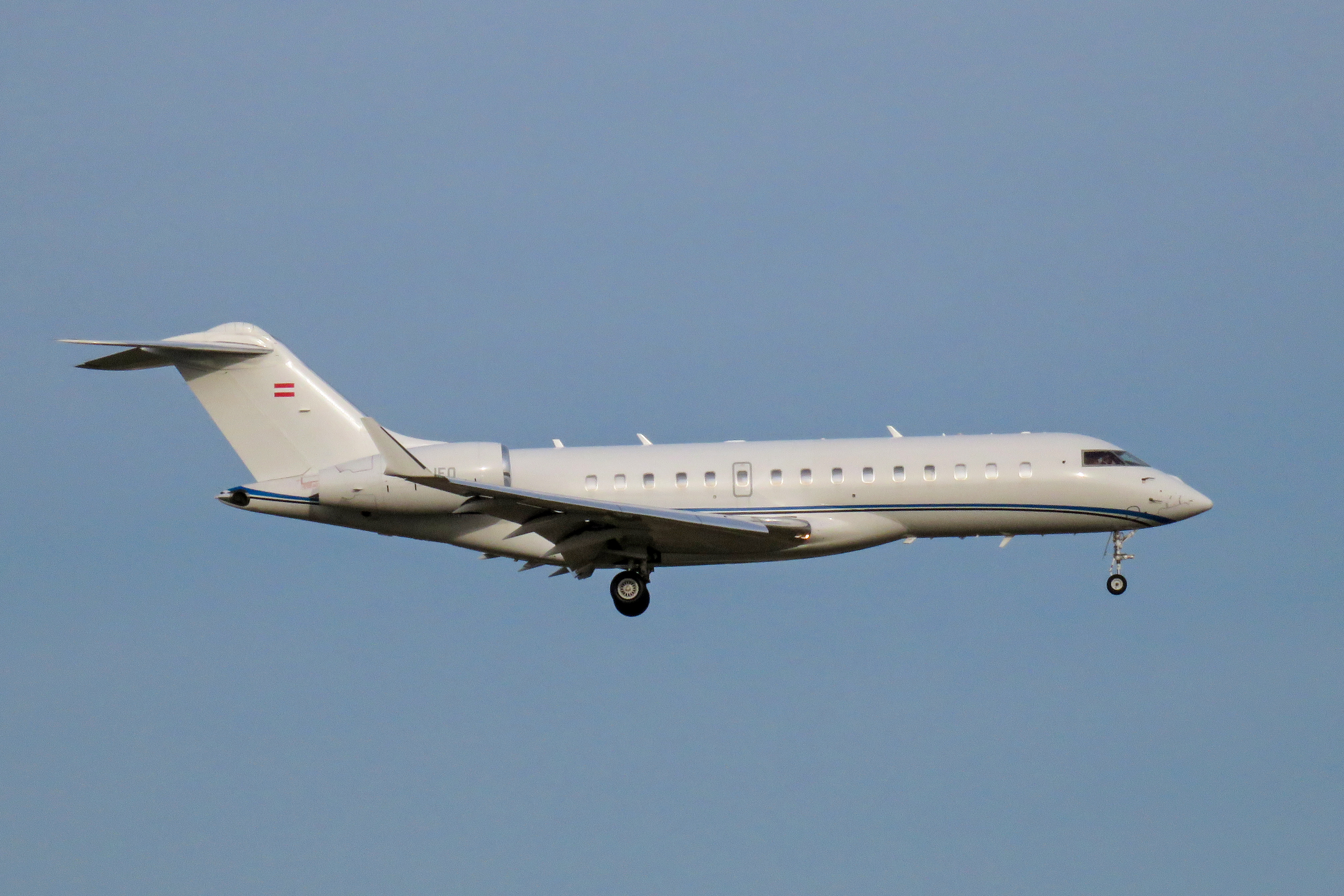
- Bombardier Global 6000
IATA	ICAO	Call sign
-	MJF	EM-EXPRESS
- Founded: 2007
- AOC #: A-115
- Operating bases: Vienna International Airport
- Fleet size: 14
- Destinations: charter
- Headquarters: Schwechat, Austria
- Website: mjet.eu

MJET is an Austrian operator headquartered in Schwechat and based at Vienna International Airport.

== Overview ==
Established in 2007, the company is specialized in business jet management and operations, as well as in other aviation-related activities, including consulting, flight support, aircraft sales & acquisitions, new or used aircraft deliveries. An operations control center, coordinating the company's worldwide operations, is located in MJET's headquarters in Schwechat, Austria, close to Vienna International Airport.

MJET's Airbus ACJ319 was displayed by Airbus S.A.S. several times at aviation exhibitions between 2014 and 2018.

== Fleet ==
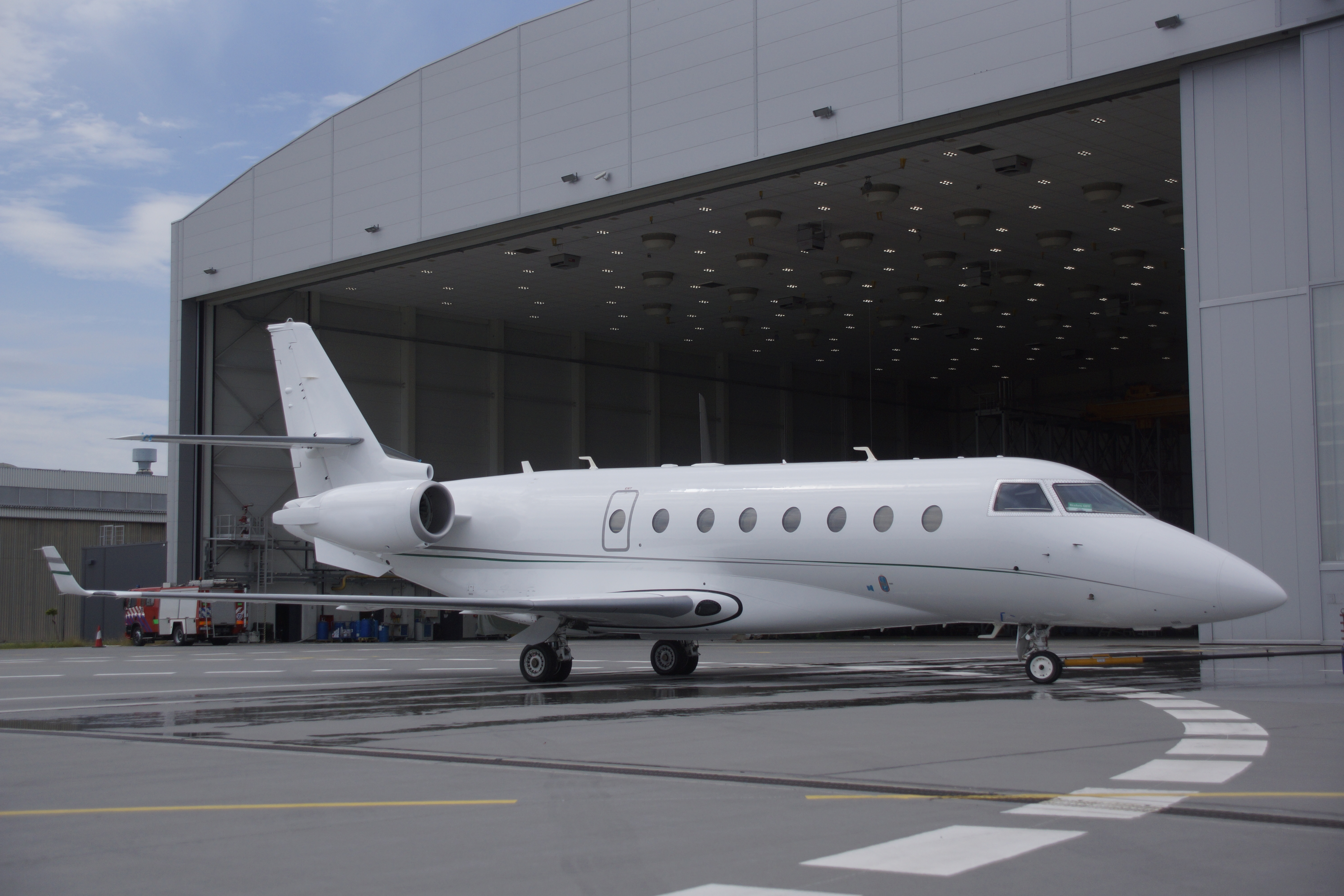
Gulfstream G200

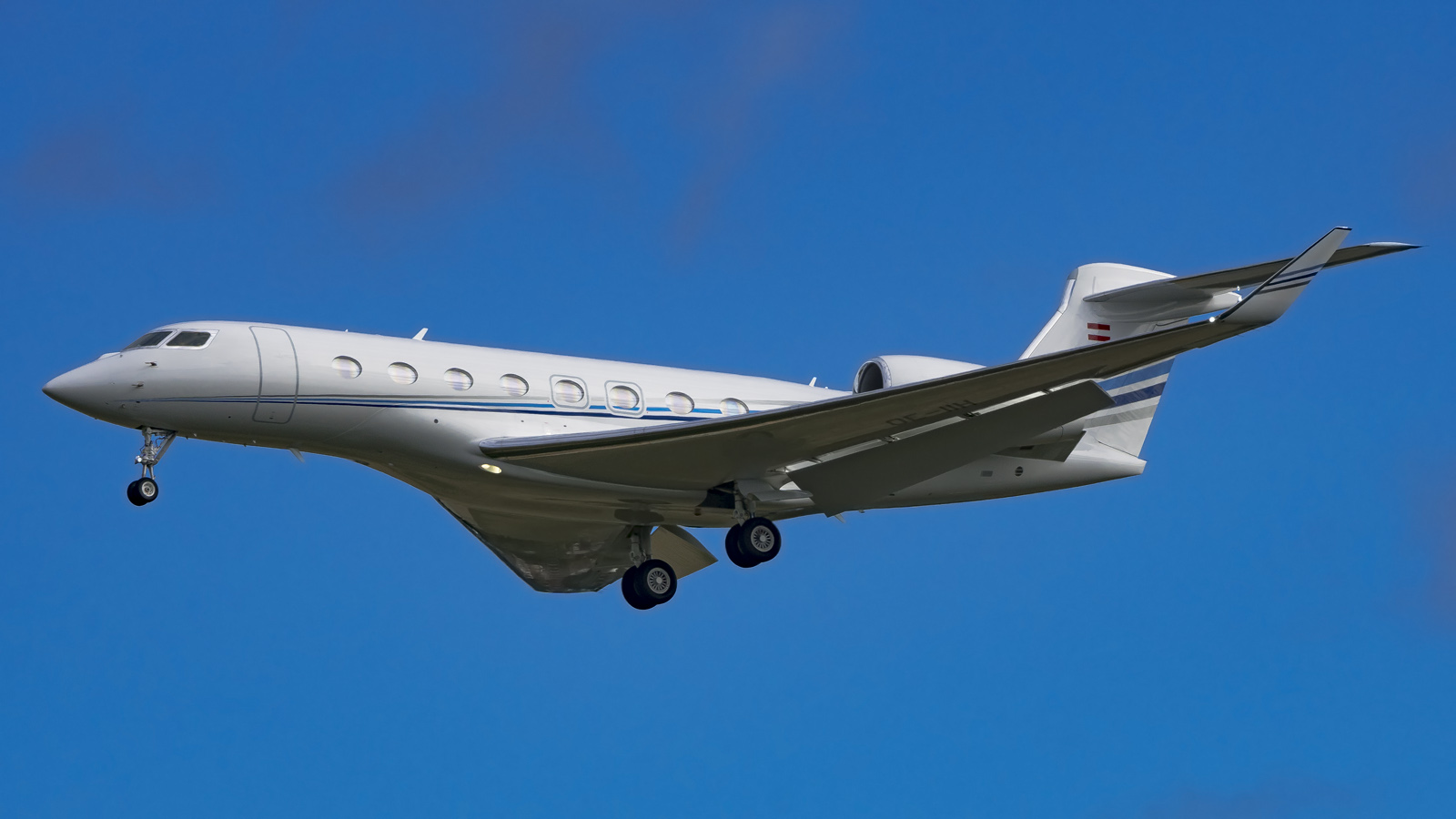
Gulfstream G650

=== Current fleet ===
The MJET managed fleet consists of the following aircraft:

A/C Type	QTY	Range	Seats
Gulfstream G650	1	Ultralong-range	16
Gulfstream G600	1	Ultralong-range	15
Airbus ACJ319	1	Long-range	21
Gulfstream G500	3	Long-range	13-14
Gulfstream G450	3	Long-range	13-16
Challenger 650	1	Long-range	12
Embraer Legacy 650 / Legacy 600	1	Long-range	13
Gulfstream G200	1	Long-range	9-10
Embraer Phenom 300	1	short-range	6
Pilatus PC-24	2	short-range	6-8

=== Former aircraft types ===
The following aircraft types have been operated or managed by MJET in the past and phased-out or replaced with newer jets: Gulfstream V, Hawker 900XP, Hawker 750, Challenger 601, Fokker 100EJ* and Airbus A320 VIP.
