= Fuel dumping =

Emergency procedure for aircraft to reduce weight

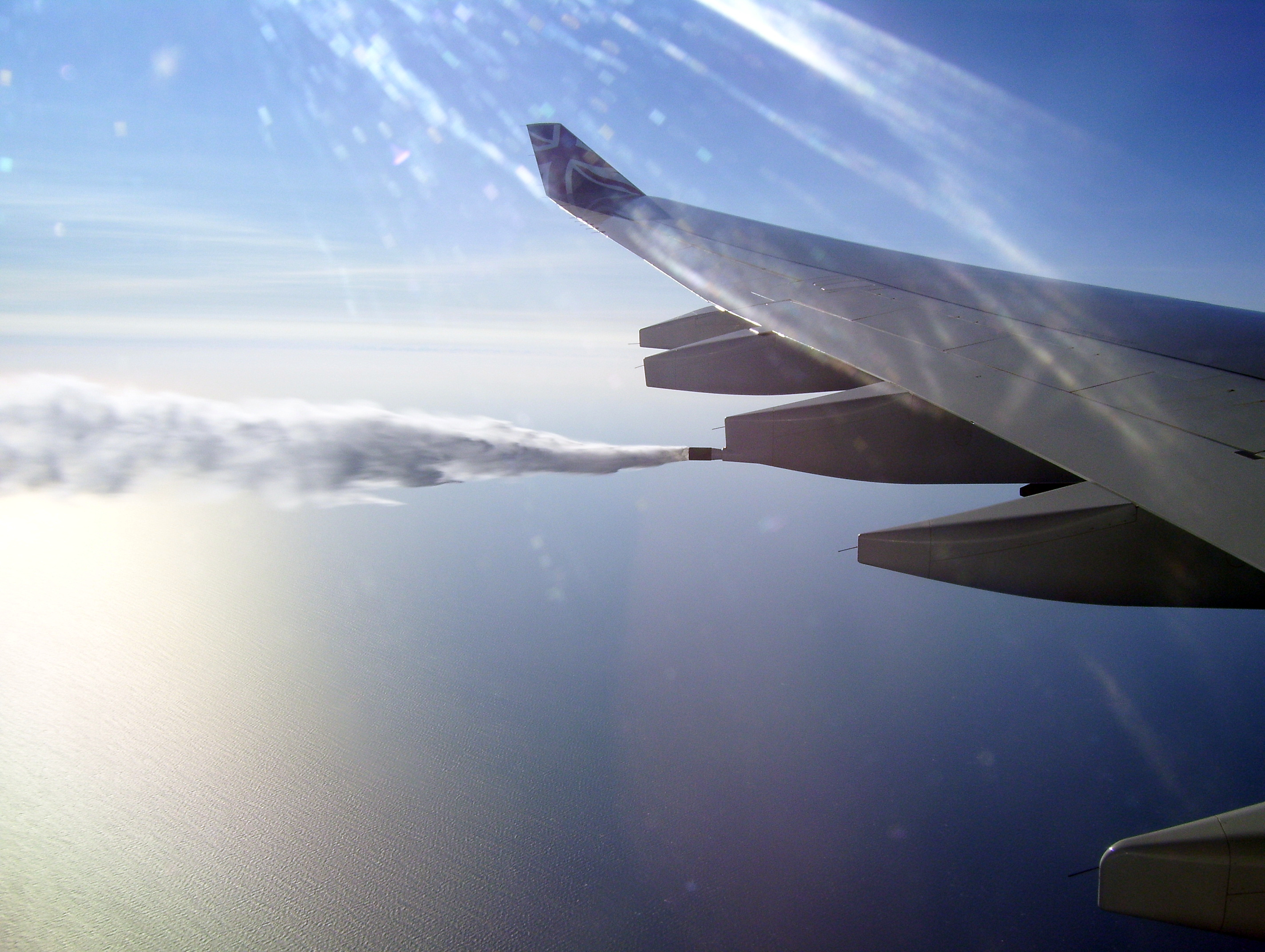
Fuel dumping of an Airbus A340-600 above the Atlantic Ocean near Nova Scotia

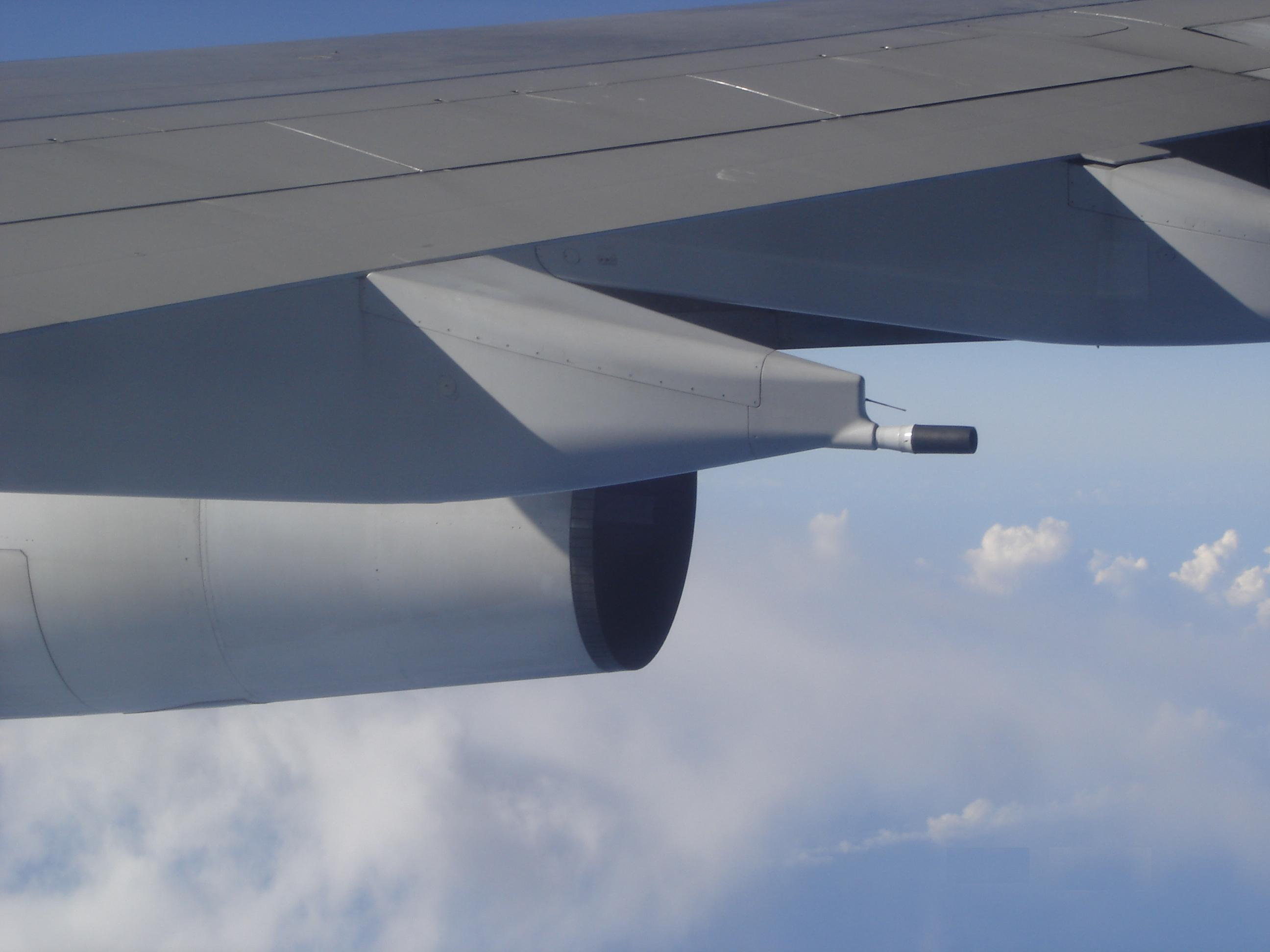
Fuel dump nozzle of an Airbus A340-300

Fuel dumping (or a fuel jettison) is the ejection of fuel by an aircraft while being in the air. It is done in certain emergency situations before a return to the airport shortly after takeoff, or before landing short of the intended destination (emergency landing) to reduce the aircraft's weight.

== Aircraft fuel dump ==
=== Weight issues ===
Aircraft have two main types of weight limits: the maximum takeoff weight is composed of dry operating weight (DOW) plus payload (passengers and cargo), collectively the zero fuel weight (ZFW), plus the trip fuel, contingency, alternate, final reserve and the block fuel (taxi fuel), and the maximum structural landing weight, with the maximum structural landing weight almost always being the lower of the two. This allows an aircraft on a normal, routine flight to take off at a higher weight, consume fuel en route, and arrive at a lower weight.

=== History ===
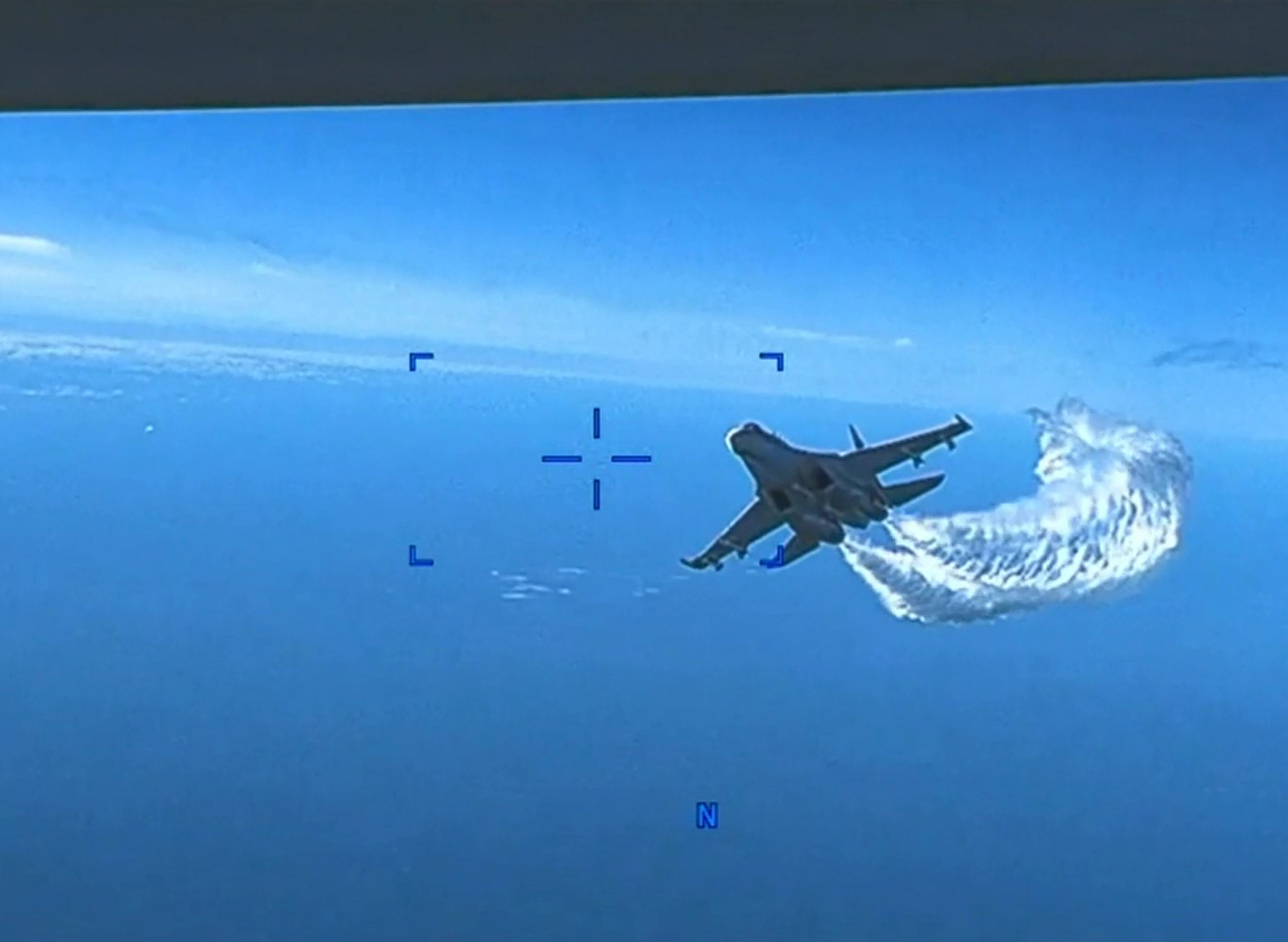
A Sukhoi Su-27 Flanker fighter jet of the Russian Air Force attempting to dump fuel onto a General Atomics MQ-9 Reaper of the United States Air Force over the Black Sea during the 2023 Black Sea drone incident

As jets began flying in the US in the late 1950s and early 1960s, the FAA rule in effect at the time mandated that if the ratio between an aircraft's maximum structural takeoff weight and its maximum structural landing weight was greater than 1.05, the aircraft had to have a fuel-dump system installed. Aircraft such as the Boeing 707 and 727 and the Douglas DC-8 had fuel dump systems. Any of those aircraft needing to return to a takeoff airport above the maximum landing weight would jettison an amount of fuel sufficient to reduce the aircraft's weight below that maximum landing weight limit, and then land.

During the 1960s, Boeing introduced the 737, and Douglas introduced the DC-9, the original models of each being for shorter routes; the 105% figure was not an issue, thus they had no fuel-dump systems installed. During the 1960s and 1970s, both Boeing and Douglas "grew" their respective aircraft as far as operational capabilities were concerned via Pratt & Whitney's development of increasingly powerful variants of the JT8D engines that powered both aircraft series. Both aircraft were now capable of longer duration flights, with increased weight limits, and complying with the existing 105% rule became problematic due to the costs associated with adding a fuel-dump system to aircraft in production. Considering the more powerful engines that had been developed, the FAA changed the rules to delete the 105% requirement, and Federal Aviation Regulations 25.1001 was enacted stating a jettison system was not required if the climb requirements of FAR 25.119 (Landing Climb) and FAR 25.121 (Approach Climb) could be met, assuming a 15-minute flight. In other words, for a go-around with full landing flaps and all engines operating, and at approach flap setting and one engine inoperative, respectively.

- On 11 September 2001 a large-scale fuel dumping occurred, when U.S. airspace was closed due to the September 11 attacks. International flights en route to the U.S. were either turned back to their point of origin or diverted to land in Canada and other countries. Many of these flights were fuelled for travel well into the American interior; for those mid-flight aircraft unable to land due to excessive fuel weight, dumping was necessary.
- On 04 April 2018 a McDonnell Douglas KC-10 Extender operated by the United States Air Force dumped 43 tonnes of fuel over Rhineland-Palatinate at a height of 5,000 meters shortly after taking off from Ramstein Air Base.
- On 14 March 2023 a Russian Sukhoi Su-27 fighter dumped fuel on an American MQ-9 Reaper drone over the Black Sea, according to US European Command. Video of the incident appeared to corroborate the report.

=== Types of aircraft ===
Since most twin jet airliners can meet these requirements, most aircraft of this type such as the Boeing 737 (all models), the DC-9/MD80/Boeing 717, the A320 family and various regional jet ("RJ") aircraft do not have fuel dump systems installed. In the event of an emergency requiring a return to the departure airport, the aircraft circles nearby in order to consume fuel to get down to within the maximum structural landing weight limit, or, if the situation demands, simply land overweight without delay. Modern aircraft are designed with possible overweight landings in mind, but this is not done except in cases of emergency, and various maintenance inspections are required afterwards.

Long-range twin jets such as the Boeing 767 and the Airbus A300, A310, A330, and A350 may or may not have fuel dump systems, depending upon how the aircraft was ordered, since on some aircraft they are a customer option. However, Boeing's larger long-range twin jets such as the Boeing 767-400ER, 777 and 787 always have a fuel dump system. Three- and four-engine jets like the Lockheed L-1011, McDonnell Douglas DC-10 / MD-11, Boeing 747, and Airbus A340 and A380 usually have difficulty meeting the requirements of FAR 25.119 near maximum structural takeoff weight, thus most of those have jettison systems. A Boeing 757 has no fuel-dump capability as its maximum landing weight is similar to the maximum take-off weight.

=== Area and flight level ===
Fuel-dumping operations are coordinated with air traffic control, and precautions are taken to keep other aircraft clear of such areas. Fuel dumping is usually accomplished at a high enough altitude (minimum 6,000 feet, AGL), where the fuel will dissipate before reaching the ground. Fuel leaves the aircraft through a specific point on each wing, usually closer to the wingtips and farther away from engines, and initially appears as more liquid than vapor. Specific areas have been designated where fuel dumping is allowed to avoid damage or harm where the fuel may drop; generally speaking, this is above seas or unpopulated areas above land. Delta Air Lines Flight 89 is an example of fuel dumping that violated established regulations: on 14 January 2020, it likely dumped 15,000–20,000 US gallons (12,000–17,000 imp gal; 57,000–76,000 L) of fuel at a low altitude over a populated area in Los Angeles, causing injuries to 56 people including school children below.

=== Dump rates ===
It is difficult to quote specific dump rates even for specific types of aircraft since the dumped fuel is not pumped but delivered by gravity feed so as to be more independent of electrical systems, which might be unavailable in a fuel-dump scenario. This means the actual rate depends on the pressure exerted by the fuel head: the more fuel on board, the higher the rate at which it flows out. This also means that the dump rate is not constant, but decreases while dumping because the fuel head and its pressure decrease.

As a rule of thumb for the Boeing 747, pilots either quote dump rates ranging within 1–2 tons per minute or reference a thumb formula of dump time = (dump weight / 2) + 5 in minutes. In 2009, an Airbus A340-300 returning to its airport of departure shortly after takeoff dumped 53 tons of fuel in 11 minutes.

== Dump-and-burn ==
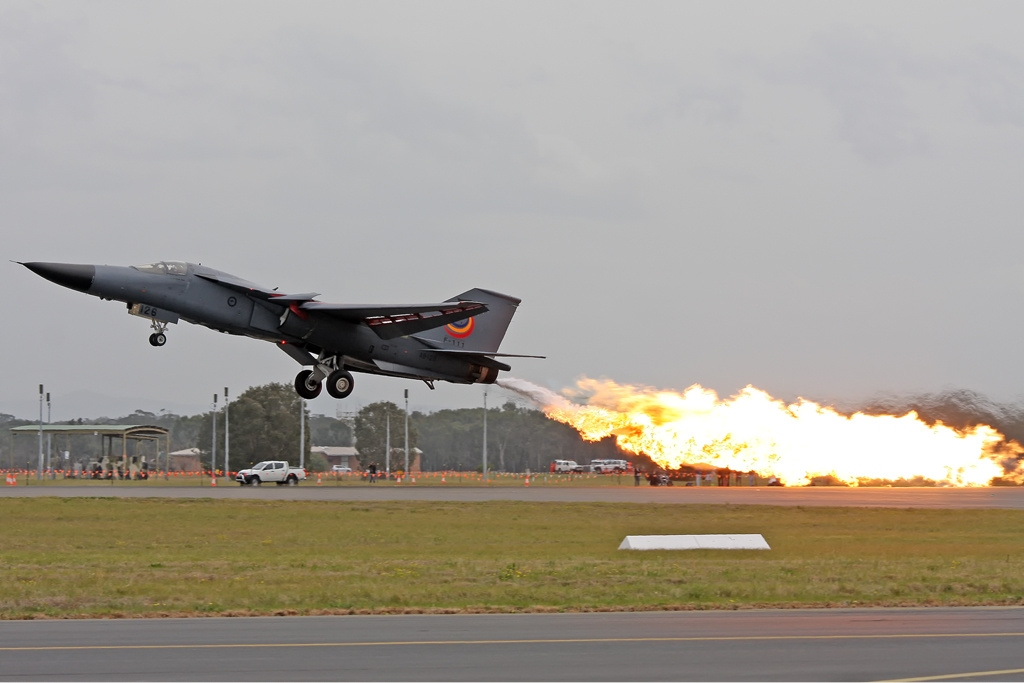
RAAF F-111 performing a dump-and-burn

A dump-and-burn is a fuel dump in which the fuel is ignited, intentionally, using the plane's afterburner. A spectacular flame combined with high speed makes this a popular display for air shows or as a finale to fireworks. Dump-and-burns are also referred to as "torching" or "zippos".

The General Dynamics F-111 Aardvark's dump and burn is so powerful that it can set a runway on fire, as the flame burns rubber from skid marks. The aircraft was used for this purpose in Australia during the closing ceremony of the 2000 Summer Olympics and (until 2010) regularly at Brisbane's Riverfire and the Australian Grand Prix. The F-111 is well suited to perform the dump-and-burn maneuver, as its fuel dump nozzle is located between the engine exhausts.

== See also ==
- Drop tank – external tank that can be jettisoned when empty or in an emergency
- Delta Air Lines Flight 89 – dumped fuel over a densely populated area, resulting in illness of people on ground
- Cessna 188 Pacific rescue – use of fuel dumping in an attempt to make the aircraft more visible
- Swissair Flight 111 – dumped fuel as per procedures, but was engulfed in flames before the landing weight was reached
- Samoan Clipper – in-flight explosion
