= Manufacturer's empty weight =

In aviation, manufacturer's empty weight (MEW) (also known as manufacturer's weight empty (MWE)) is the weight of the aircraft "as built" and includes the weight of the structure, power plant, furnishings, installations, systems, and other equipment that are considered an integral part of an aircraft before additional operator items are added for operation.

Basic aircraft empty weight is essentially the same and excludes any baggage, passengers, or usable fuel. Some manufacturers define this empty weight as including optional equipment, i.e. GPS units, cargo baskets, or spotlights.

== Specification MEW ==
This is the MEW quoted in the manufacturer's standard specification documents and is the aircraft standard basic dry weight upon which all other standard specifications and aircraft performance are based by the manufacturer.

The Specification MEW includes the weight of:

- Airframe structure – primary and secondary structures (fuselage, wing, tail, control surfaces, nacelles, landing gear).
- Powerplant.
- Auxiliary power unit (APU).
- Systems (instruments, navigation, hydraulics, pneumatics, fuel systems (but not fuel itself), electrical system, electronics, fixed furnishings (but not operator specific), air conditioning, anti-ice system, etc.).
- Fixed equipment and services considered an integral part of the aircraft.
- Fixed ballast (if present).
- Closed system fluids (such as hydraulic fluids).

For small aircraft, the MEW may include unusable fuel and oil.

The Specification MEW excludes the weight of:

- All fuel (both usable and unusable).
- Potable water, anti-ice, and chemicals in toilets.
- Engine oil and APU oil.
- All specification items, selections, and installations which are non-basic (i.e. optional selections).
- Customer specific selections, installations, and options.
- Operator/operating items.
- Removable equipment and services.
- Payload.

For small aircraft, the specification MEW is known as the standard empty weight (or standard weight empty).

== See also ==
- Aircraft gross weight
- Operating empty weight
