= Operating empty weight =

Aircraft weight without fuel or payload

Empty weight (EW) is the sum of the ‘as built’ manufacturer's empty weight (MEW), plus any standard items (SI) plus any operator items (OI), EW = MEW + SI + OI. The EW is calculated for each aircraft series and each unique configuration of an aircraft and is confirmed by periodically weighing it. The "Operating empty weight" (OEW) is the sum of the empty weight and the crew plus their baggage.

Standard items include all structural modification or configuration orders that may have altered the MEW, including all fluids necessary for operation such as engine oil, engine coolant, water, hydraulic fluid and unusable fuel. Operator items include fixed, optional equipment added by the operator for service reasons.

The weight added to the aircraft above its OEW for a given flight is variable and includes fuel for the flight and the cargo. Cargo depends upon the type of aircraft; i.e., passengers plus baggage for a transport or commuter airplane, materiel for a cargo airplane, stores for fighters/bombers and service loads such as meals and beverages. Fuel and cargo weights may alter the centre of gravity and flight performance, and require careful calculation before each flight.

Aircraft purchase price by type is a close linear function of EW.

== See also ==
- Maximum takeoff weight
- Aircraft gross weight
- Zero-fuel weight
