= Maximum landing weight =

Maximum permitted aircraft weight

The maximum landing weight (MLW), also known as the maximum structural landing weight or maximum structural landing mass, is the maximum aircraft gross weight due to design or operational limitations at which an aircraft is permitted to land. The MLW is set in order to ensure safe landings; if an aircraft weighs too much, it may suffer structural damage or even break apart upon landing. Aircraft also have a maximum take-off weight, which is almost always higher than the maximum landing weight, so that an aircraft can weigh less upon landing due to burning fuel during the flight.

The operation landing weight may be limited to a weight lower than the maximum landing weight by the most restrictive of the following requirements:

- Aircraft performance requirements for a given altitude and temperature:

- landing field length requirements,
- approach and landing climb requirements.

- Noise requirements

If the flight has been of unusually short duration, such as due to an emergency just after takeoff requiring a return to the airport, it may be necessary to dump fuel to reduce the landing weight. Some aircraft are unable to dump fuel, however. For example, on 3 February 2020, Air Canada Flight 837, a Boeing 767-300, suffered a rear tyre failure during take-off at Madrid–Barajas Airport on its way to Toronto, causing its left engine to catch fire. The pilots managed to extinguish it by shutting the engine down, but as 767-300s are not designed for fuel dumping, it had to stay in a single-engine holding pattern for over 4 hours to burn fuel and achieve its maximum landing weight, while an SAF fighter reported minimal damage to the landing gear. The plane landed safely and nobody was injured.

Sometimes the emergency may be so pressing that the aircraft has no time to dump or burn fuel in order to achieve its maximum landing weight before touchdown; in that case, a risky overweight landing may be permitted. In other cases, the flight crew may fail to dump fuel when it still had the time to do so before landing, leading to fatal accidents such as Aeroflot Flight 1492 on 5 May 2019, where an apparently needlessly overweight landing turned into a crash that killed 41 of the 78 people on board.

Where aircraft overweight landing is permitted, a structural inspection or evaluation of the touch-down loads before the next aircraft operation will be required in case damage has occurred.
