= Zero-fuel weight =

Total weight of an aircraft and its contents, minus usable fuel

The zero-fuel weight (ZFW) of an aircraft is the total weight of the airplane and all its contents, minus the total weight of the usable fuel on board. Unusable fuel is included in ZFW. Remember the takeoff weight components contributions:

$$OEW + PL + FOB = TOW$$

Where OEW is the Operating Empty Weight (that is a characteristic of the plane), PL is the Payload actually embarked, and FOB the Fuel actually embarked and TOW the actual take-off weight. ZFW is also defined as OEW + PL. The previous formula becomes:

$$ZFW + FOB = TOW$$.

For many types of airplane, the airworthiness limitations include a maximum zero-fuel weight. This limitation is specified to ensure bending moments on the wing roots are not excessive during flight. When the aircraft is loaded before flight, the zero-fuel weight must not exceed the maximum zero-fuel weight.

== Maximum zero fuel weight ==
The maximum zero fuel weight (MZFW) is the maximum weight allowed before usable fuel and other specified usable agents (engine injection fluid, and other consumable propulsion agents) are loaded in defined sections of the aircraft as limited by strength and airworthiness requirements. It may include usable fuel in specified tanks when carried in lieu of payload. The addition of usable and consumable items to the zero fuel weight must be in accordance with the applicable government regulations so that airplane structure and airworthiness requirements are not exceeded.

If the limitations applicable to a transport category airplane type include a maximum zero-fuel weight it must be specified in the Airplane Flight Manual and the type certificate data sheet for the airplane type.

=== Maximum zero fuel weight in aircraft operations ===
When an aircraft is being loaded with crew, passengers, baggage and freight it is most important to ensure that the ZFW does not exceed the MZFW. When an aircraft is being loaded with fuel it is most important to ensure that the takeoff weight will not exceed the maximum permissible takeoff weight.

MZFW : The maximum permissible weight of an aircraft with no disposable fuel or oil.

$$ZFW + FOB = TOW$$

where FOB is Fuel On Board.

For any aircraft with a defined MZFW, the maximum payload ($PL_{max}$) can be calculated as the MZFW minus the OEW (operational empty weight)

$$PL_{max} = MZFW - OEW$$

=== Maximum zero fuel weight in type certification ===
The maximum zero fuel weight is an important parameter in demonstrating compliance with gust design criteria for transport category airplanes.

== Wing bending relief ==
In fixed-wing aircraft, fuel is usually carried in the wings. While the aircraft is in the air, weight in the wings does not contribute as significantly to the bending moment in the wing as does weight in the fuselage. This is because the lift on the wings and the weight of the fuselage bend the wing tips upwards and the wing roots downwards; but the weight of the wings, including the weight of fuel in the wings, bend the wing tips downwards, providing relief to the bending effect on the wing.

Considering the bending moment at the wing root, the capacity for extra weight in the wings is greater than the capacity for extra weight in the fuselage. Designers of airplanes can optimise the maximum takeoff weight and prevent overloading in the fuselage by specifying a MZFW. This is usually done for large airplanes with cantilever wings. (Airplanes with strut-braced wings achieve substantial wing bending relief by having the load of the fuselage applied by the strut mid-way along the wing semi-span. Extra wing bending relief cannot be achieved by particular placement of the fuel. There is usually no MZFW specified for an airplane with a strut-braced wing.)

Most small airplanes do not have an MZFW specified among their limitations. For these airplanes with cantilever wings, the loading case that must be considered when determining the maximum takeoff weight is the airplane with zero fuel and all disposable load in the fuselage. With zero fuel in the wing the only wing bending relief is due to the weight of the wing.

== See also ==
- Index of aviation articles
- Aircraft gross weight
- Dry weight - The equivalent term for automobiles
