= Usable fuel =

In aviation, usable fuel is the fuel on board an aircraft that can actually be used by its engines. It is defined as the total quantity of fuel in all fuel tanks, minus the fuel quantity necessary to comply with the unusable fuel supply determination requirements. It is the only value that should be used when calculating the amount of fuel required. It is also used when calculating or defining other key parameters of an aircraft such as MTOW, zero-fuel weight etc.

As this figure is calculated/defined for a plane in level flight it is possible that the engines of an aircraft run dry (out of fuel) even when the amount of usable fuel is still above zero, such as if the wings are not level and/or the angle of attack is higher or lower than when cruising. The inverse is also possible; in some conditions, fuel can continue to be fed to the engines when the usable fuel is below zero.

The opposite of usable fuel is unusable fuel. This is the fuel quantity stored in the aircraft fuel tank that cannot be supplied to the engine, due to the design and positioning of fuel pumps, tank ribs, such as fuel under the pump-intake, fuel behind ribs of a tank, fuel in lines between the tanks and the engines. However the value is often used to help calibrate the aircraft's fuel gauge. The unusable fuel figure is calculated for an aircraft fuel tank in "the most adverse fuel feed condition occurring under each intended operation and flight maneuver involving that tank". Although the term is mainly used in aviation it is sometimes also used for other craft with engines.

== Factors that limit usable fuel ==
There are several factors that can make it difficult to determine the amount of usable fuel. One such factor is the aircraft's movement during flight. When an aircraft is in motion, changes in attitude such as role or pitch movements mean the fuel tanks do not always remain level. To mitigate this risk, analytical methods are used to calculate the maximum available fuel whilst the aircraft is in such extreme attitudes.

The complexity of an aircraft's fuel delivery system may also influence the amount of usable fuel available. Simple systems on light aircraft often use only two gravity fed tanks to deliver fuel to the engine. However larger aircraft can feature multiple tanks along with multiple pumps. This complexity increases the risk of fuel starvation incidents even when plenty of fuel is available, for example via incorrect tank selection or faulty components, leaving fuel unavailable to use. In larger aircraft, due to tank shape or installation constraints, a small amount of fuel can remain and cannot be pumped by the fuel pumps into the feeder tanks, thus becoming part of the unusable fuel.

Unusable fuel also includes the quantity of fuel required to fill the aircraft's fuel lines, and includes the fuel that remains trapped in the tank sumps. The fuel sumps are designed to allow water and debris contamination to migrate to the lowest point where it can be drained before flight. If the drain points become blocked by sludge, ice, or other contaminants, the amount of unusable fuel may also increase.

== See also ==
- Index of aviation articles
