= Maximum takeoff weight =

Maximum weight of a craft at which takeoff is permitted

Takeoff weight components

The maximum takeoff weight (MTOW) or maximum gross takeoff weight (MGTOW) or maximum takeoff mass (MTOM) of an aircraft, also known as the maximum structural takeoff weight or maximum structural takeoff mass, is the maximum weight at which the pilot is allowed to attempt to take off, due to structural or other limits. The analogous term for rockets is gross lift-off mass, or GLOW. MTOW is usually specified in units of kilograms or pounds.

MTOW is the heaviest weight at which the aircraft has been shown to meet all the airworthiness requirements applicable to it. It refers to the maximum permissible aircraft weight at the start of the takeoff run. MTOW of an aircraft is fixed and does not vary with altitude, air temperature, or the length of the runway to be used for takeoff or landing.

Maximum permissible takeoff weight or "regulated takeoff weight", varies according to flap setting, altitude, air temperature, length of runway and other factors. It is different from one takeoff to the next, but can never be higher than the MTOW.

== Certification standards ==
Certification standards applicable to the airworthiness of an aircraft contain many requirements. Some of these requirements can only be met by specifying a maximum weight for the aircraft, and demonstrating that the aircraft can meet the requirement at all weights up to, and including, the specified maximum. This limit is typically driven by structural requirements – to ensure the aircraft structure is capable of withstanding all the loads likely to be imposed on it during the takeoff, and occasionally by the maximum flight weight.

== Multiple MTOW ==
It is possible to have an aircraft certified with a reduced MTOW, lower than the structural maximum, to take advantage of lower MTOW-based fees, such as insurance premiums, landing fees and air traffic control fees. This is considered a permanent modification.

Alternatively, holders of an Air Operator Certificate (AOC) may vary the Maximum Declared Take-Off Weight (MDTOW) for their aircraft. They can subscribe to a scheme, and then vary the weight for each aircraft without further charge.

An aircraft can have its MTOW increased by reinforcement due to additional or stronger materials. For example, the Airbus A330 242 tonnes MTOW variant / A330neo uses Scandium–aluminium (scalmalloy) to avoid an empty weight increase.

== Maximum permissible takeoff weight or maximum allowed takeoff weight ==
In many circumstances an aircraft may not be permitted to take off at its MTOW. In these circumstances the maximum weight permitted for takeoff will be determined taking account of the following:

- Wing flap setting. See the Spanair Flight 5022 crash
- Airfield altitude (height above sea-level) – This affects air pressure which affects maximum engine power or thrust.
- Air temperature – This affects air density which affects maximum engine power or thrust.
- Length of runway – A short runway means the aircraft has less distance to accelerate to takeoff speed. The length for computation of maximum permitted takeoff weight may be adjusted if the runway has clearways and/or stopways.
- Runway wind component – The best condition is a strong headwind straight along the runway. The worst condition is a tailwind. If there is a crosswind it is the wind component along the runway which must be taken into account.
- Condition of runway – The best runway for taking off is a dry, paved runway. An unpaved runway or one with traces of snow will provide more rolling friction which will cause the airplane to accelerate more slowly. See the Munich air disaster.
- Obstacles – An airplane must be able to take off and gain enough height to clear all obstacles and terrain beyond the end of the runway.

The maximum weight at which a takeoff may be attempted, taking into account the above factors, is called the maximum permissible takeoff weight, maximum allowed takeoff weight or regulated takeoff weight.

== Field Limited Weight ==
The Field Limited Weight is the lowest of the:

- Take-Off Distance Limited Weight
- Engine-Out accelerate-stop distance limited weight
- Engine-Out Take-Off Distance Limited Weight

== Runway Limited Weight ==
The Runway Limited Weight is the lowest of the:

- Field Limited Weight
- VMCG limited weight
- Tyre speed limited weight
- Brake energy limited weight

== Regulated Take-Off Weight ==
The Regulated Take-Off Weight is the lowest of the:

- Runway limited weight
- Obstacle limited weight
- Climb limited weight

== See also ==
- ICAO recommendations on use of the International System of Units
- Aircraft gross weight
- List of airliners by maximum takeoff weight
- Maximum zero-fuel weight
- Operating empty weight
- Wake turbulence category
