= Bombardier CRJ100/200 =

Regional jet airliner

CRJ100 / CRJ200
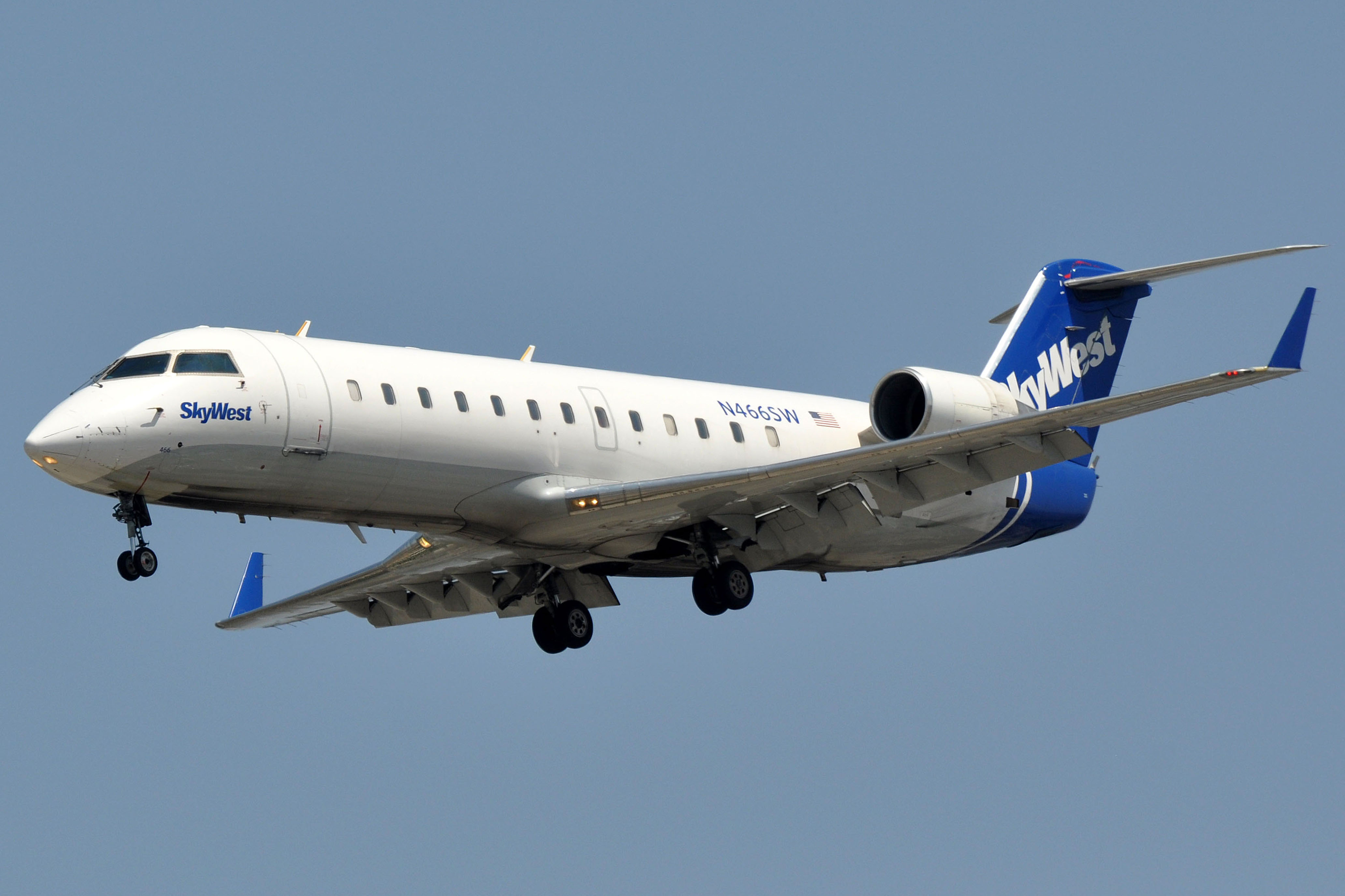
- CRJ200 flown by SkyWest Airlines, the largest operator of the type

General information
- Type: Regional jet
- National origin: Canada
- Manufacturer: Bombardier Aerospace
- Status: In service
- Primary users: SkyWest Airlines Air Wisconsin; Jazz Aviation
- Number built: 1,021

History
- Manufactured: 1991–2006
- Introduction date: 19 October 1992 with Lufthansa CityLine
- First flight: 10 May 1991
- Developed from: Bombardier Challenger 600 series
- Variant: Bombardier Challenger 850
- Developed into: Bombardier CRJ700 series

The Bombardier CRJ100 and CRJ200 (previously Canadair CRJ100 and CRJ200) are regional jets designed and manufactured by Bombardier Aerospace between 1991 and 2006, the first of the Bombardier CRJ family.

The Canadair Regional Jet (CRJ) program, derived from the Challenger 600 business jet, was launched in early 1989. The first CRJ100 prototype made its maiden flight on 10 May 1991. Canada's first jet airliner to enter commercial service was introduced by launch customer Lufthansa in 1992.

The 50 seat aircraft is powered by two GE CF34 turbofans, mounted on the rear fuselage. The CRJ200 has more efficient turbofan engines for lower fuel consumption, increased cruise altitude and speed. During the late 1990s, it was stretched into the CRJ700 series. Production ended in 2006 but many remain in service. In 2020, Mitsubishi Heavy Industries purchased the entire CRJ line from Bombardier, and will continue support for the aircraft.

CRJ100 and CRJ200 are marketing designations defining a CRJ100 of aircraft type CL-600-2B19 with CF34-3A1 engines and a CRJ200 as CL-600-2B19 variant with CF34-3B1 engines.

Some frequent flyers have nicknamed the model the "Devil's Chariot", citing its cramped seating and windows positioned below the average passenger's line of sight.

== Development ==
=== Origins ===
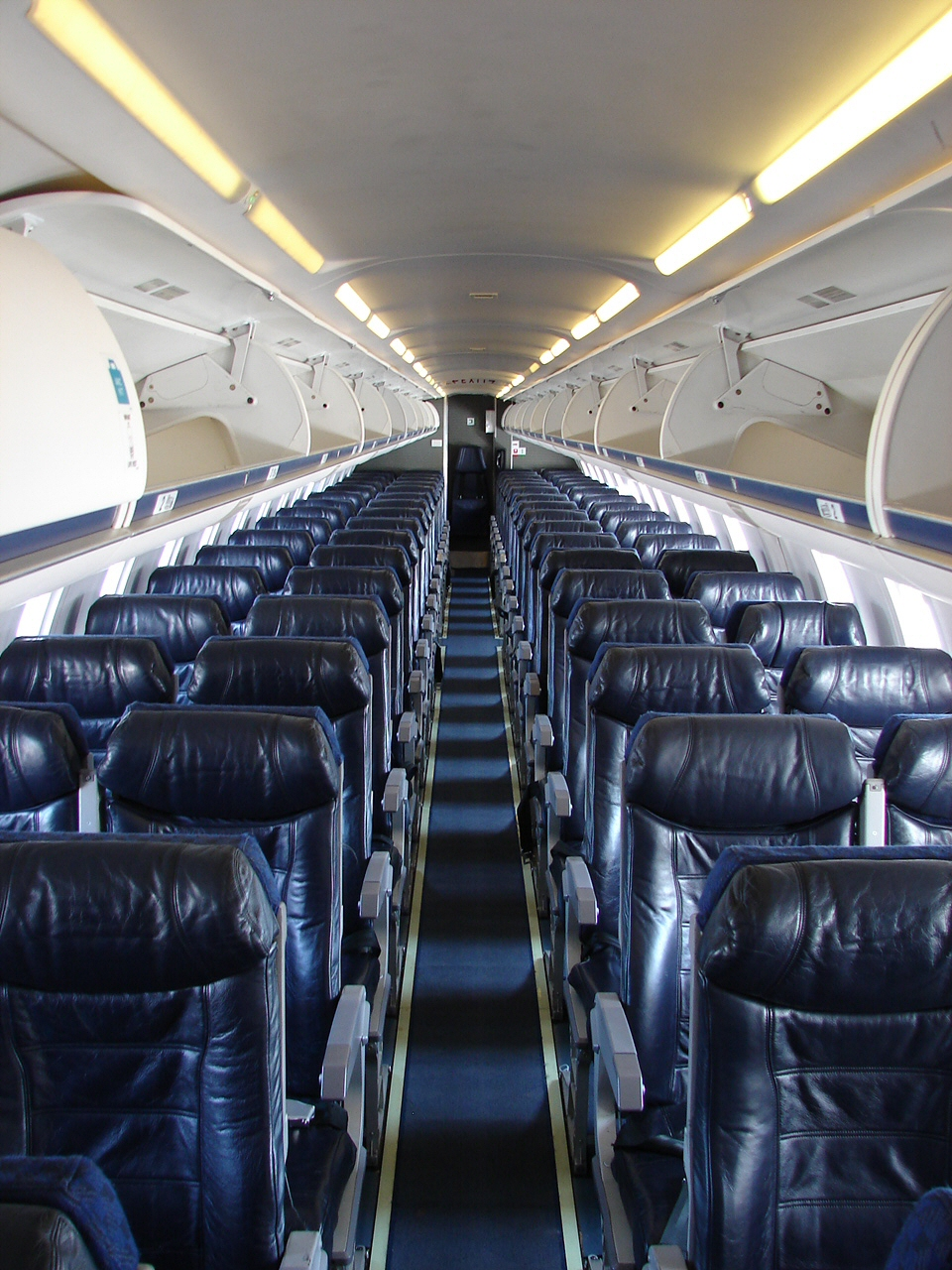
The CRJ700 cross-section allows for 2-2 seating

The CRJ family has its origins in the design of the earlier Canadair Challenger business jet. During the late 1970s, the relatively wide fuselage of the Challenger, which could seat a pair of passengers on each side of a central aisle, was observed by some Canadair officials to suggest that it would be somewhat straightforward to produce a stretch of the aircraft for the purpose of accommodating more seats. Accordingly, in 1980, the company publicised its proposal for an expanded model of the aircraft, designated as the Challenger 610E, which would have had seating for an additional 24 passengers. However, such a lengthening did not occur as a result of work on the program being terminated during the following year.

Despite the cancellation of the 610E, neither the concept or general interest in the development of an enlarged derivative had disappeared. During 1987, the year following Canadair's sale to Bombardier, design studies commenced into options for producing a substantially more ambitious stretched configuration of the Challenger.

In July 1988, Canadair targeted a $13-14 million unit price, for a demand of over 1,000 by 1999. The 48-seat jet would be stretched over the Challenger by a 128 in (3.3 m) forward plug and a 112 in (2.8 m) aft plug. Over 300 mi (480 km) routes, the faster climb and cruise gave it a one third time advantage of 50 min compared to similarly sized turboprops. The higher cost per seat of the regional jet, of $270,000 each compared to $186,600, would be balanced by its higher productivity.

During the spring of 1989, these investigations directly led to the formal launch of the Canadair Regional Jet program; it had been decided to retain the "Canadair" name despite the firm's purchase by Bombardier. The program was launched with the aim of selling at least 400 aircraft. SkyWest Airlines, a regional airline was the first US-based customer, placing an order for 10 aircraft in 1989 before the program was officially launched.

The Regional Jet program benefitted from the support of the Canadian government. Reportedly, the break even point for the type was considered to be relatively low amongst its contemporaries; it has been speculated that the bankruptcy and purchase of Learjet by Bombardier during 1990 had allowed for the development costs of the Challenger to be written off, which in turn had the impact of substantially lowering the cost of the Regional Jet program. In addition, the projected operating costs of the CRJ was lower than some of its turboprop-powered rivals, including the Fokker 50, the ATR-42, and the Bombardier Dash 8.

On 10 May 1991, the first of three development aircraft for the initial CRJ100 variant performed its first flight from Montréal–Pierre Elliott Trudeau International Airport, starting a 1,000h flight test program with three prototypes. During the following year, the type was awarded airworthiness certification; on 29 October 1992, initial deliveries to customers occurred later on that year. On 26 July 1993, the first prototype (C-FCRJ) was lost in a spin mishap near the Bombardier test center in Wichita, Kansas.

=== Further development ===
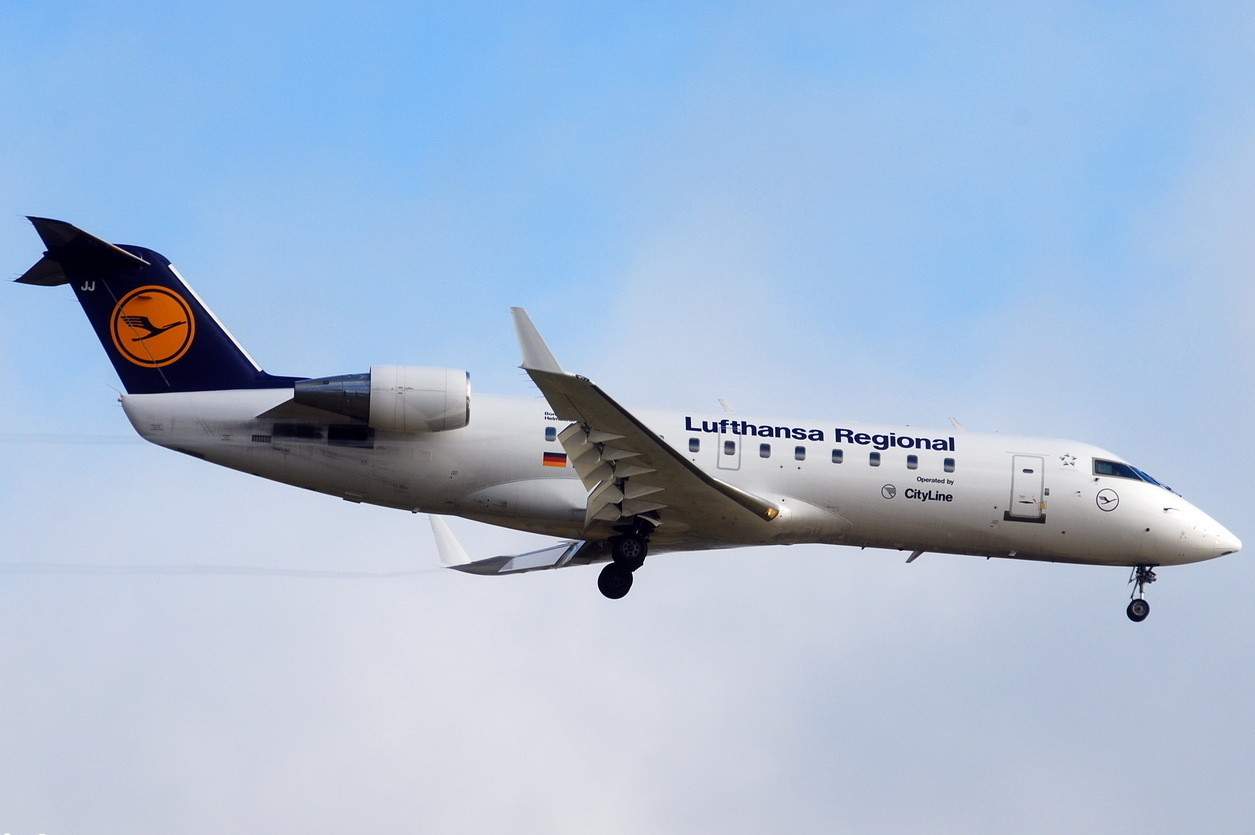
Lufthansa CityLine was the CRJ100 Launch operator

The initial model was followed by the CRJ100 ER subvariant, featuring 20 percent greater range, and the CRJ100 LR subvariant, which possessed 40 percent more range than the standard CRJ100. This sub-variant was developed with the purpose of more closely conforming with the requirements of both corporate and executive operators. A cargo door retrofit has been developed for the installation of former passenger-configured aircraft to extend the useful life of early-built CRJ100s.

The CRJ200, is almost identical to the earlier CRJ100 models, except for the adoption of more efficient GE CF34-3B1 engines; these engines had lower fuel consumption while providing improvements in performance with increased cruise altitude and increased cruise speed. Bombardier had specifically designed the new model to provide better performance and efficiencies than any of its nearest competitors at that time. SkyWest Airlines was the launch customer for the CRJ200, conducting the first revenue flight of the type on February 15, 1994. There would also be a CRJ200 freighter variant, designated as the CRJ200 PF (Package Freighter), which was developed in cooperation with Cascade Aerospace on the request of West Air Sweden.

During 1995, Bombardier embarked on design studies and a detailed market evaluation on the topic of producing a substantially enlarged derivative of the CRJ200. These efforts quickly transitioned into a $450 million program to produce such an aircraft, which was produced as the CRJ700. Many areas of commonality, such as the design of the cockpit, were retained between the CRJ200 and its newer, larger brethren, but various new systems and structures, such as an all-new wing, were incorporated into the design as well. Capable of seating up to 70 passengers, the first of these aircraft was delivered during 2001; the CRJ700 was soon joined by the even larger CRJ900 and CRJ1000 models.

On June 1, 2020, the entire Bombardier CRJ regional airliner family was sold to Mitsubishi Heavy Industries (MHI), which plans to continue manufacturing spare parts and providing maintenance support.

== Design ==
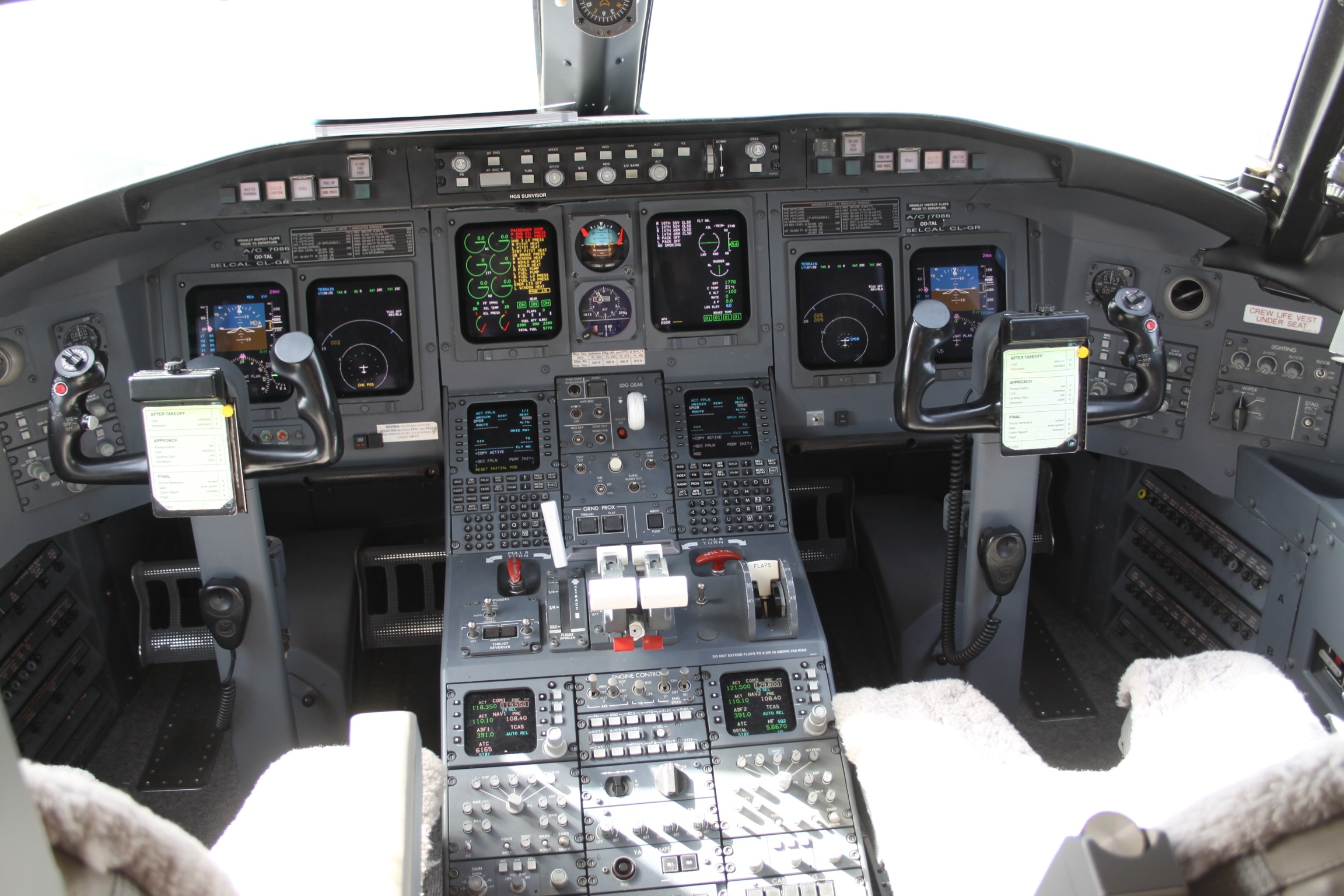
The cockpit of a CRJ100LR

The Bombardier CRJ100 and CRJ200 are a family of jet-propelled regional airliners, based upon the design of the Challenger CL-600 business jet. Roughly, the CL-600 was stretched 5.92 metres (19 feet 5 inches), which was achieved using fuselage plugs fore and aft of the wing, and was matched with the adoption of a reinforced and modified wing, an expanded fuel capacity, improved landing gear to handle the higher weights, and an additional pair of emergency exit doors. When installed in a typical seating configuration, the CRJ100 would accommodate 50 passengers; while in a maximum configuration, 52 passengers could be accommodated. It was powered by a pair of General Electric CF34-3A1 turbofan engines, each of which was capable of generating up to 41 kN (9,220 lbf) of thrust. The CRJ100 featured a Collins-built ProLine 4 avionics suite, including a weather radar. It is built as a low-wing monoplane with a T-tail empennage and a semi-monocoque fuselage largely derived from the Canadair Challenger business jet, but stretched by roughly 5.9 m via fuselage plugs before and after the wing to accommodate ~50 passengers. The wing was re-designed for high-subsonic cruise: a transonic planform with sweep and preserved winglets help reduce drag at regional-jet cruise speeds.

== Operational history ==
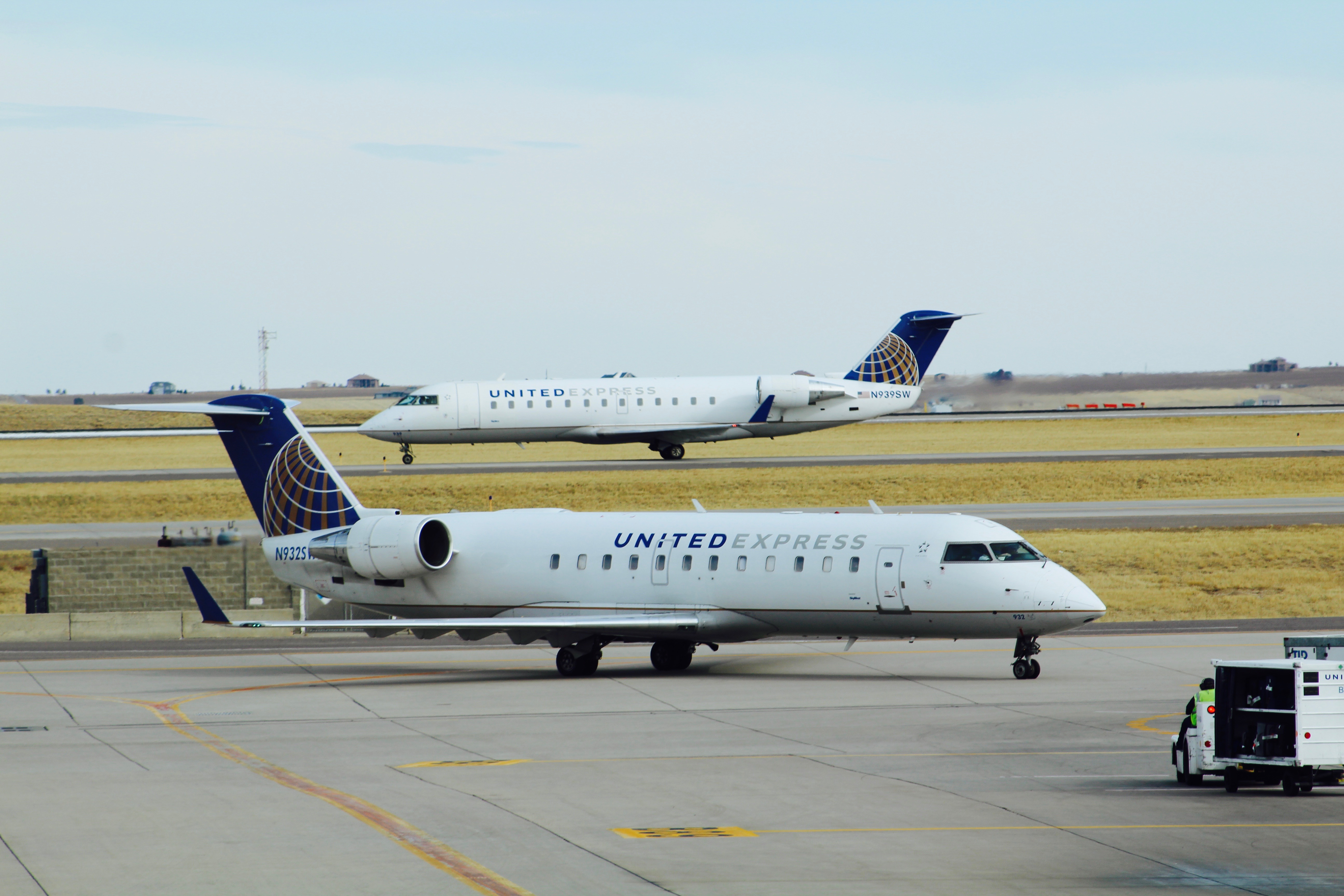
A pair of United Express CRJ200s operated by SkyWest Airlines at Denver International Airport in 2016.

German airline Lufthansa CityLine, a subsidiary of the nation's flag carrier operator Lufthansa, served as the launch customer for the CRJ100. Throughout the type's production life, it continued to be a major customer of the CRJ series. During 2001, following Lufthansa's acquisition of 25 per cent of regional airliner Eurowings, the airline ordered 15 CRJ200s with options for 30 more as part of a strategic move towards fleet commonality with Lufthansa Skyline.

During the airliner's first 100 days of operational service, the CRJ100 performed a total of 1,237 flights, during which it reportedly achieved a 99% dispatch reliability while its fuel economy was reportedly 8% superior to the originally projected figure. According to aviation author Dean Roberts, the CRJ100 had benefitted greatly from an industry-wide shift towards hub-and-spoke networks in the United States, which had resulted from the Airline Deregulation Act of 1978. Considerable demand across the North American market was experienced by both the CRJ100 and the CRJ200. The smaller size of the regional jets meant than, unlike traditional narrowbody jets, they could be used at the majority of secondary airports and avoid traditional hubs.

Soon after the entry to service of the longer range CRJ200, the model proved to be a commercial success as well. According to aerospace publication Flight International, 1999 was a record year in terms of aircraft deliveries by Bombardier. Writing around this time, authors Bijan Vasigh, Reza Taleghani, and Darryl Jenkins declared that "the CRJ program [is] one of the most successful regional aircraft programs in the world". By the end of 2000, perhaps the most significant operators of the CRJ100 included the American airline Comair, German short-haul operator Lufthansa Cityline, and French regional airline Brit Air; of its CRJ200 sibling, key operators by this time included Delta Connection, SkyWest Airlines, and Independence Air.

During early 1999, Bombardier announced the biggest ever order in the company's history; issued by Northwest Airlines, it involved a firm order for 54 CRJ200LRs along with options for a further 70 aircraft for $1.3 billion. In response to customer demand, the company stated that it was to increase production at its Montreal assembly line from 75 to 90 aircraft per year before the end of the year. By 2001, a total of 516 airliners were reportedly on order, of which 272 had been delivered. To address the backlog of nearly 250 aircraft, Bombardier worked to increase the rate of production from 9.5 regional jets per month to 12.5 regional jets. The boom in regional jets did not exclusively benefit the CRJ series; simultaneously, Brazilian manufacturer and rival firm Embraer also worked to increase their output of regional jets.

For a time, the CRJ series was viewed by Bombardier as a means of entering new markets; around the turn of the century, considerable sales focus to the Asia Pacific region was implemented, leading to several sales of regional jets to airlines in nations such as China and Japan. The company's sales strategy was augmented by the availability of financing from the Canadian government, via which means customers of the CRJ would sometimes partially-finance their purchase. In order to appropriately provide services to the diverse customers for the CRJ series, Bombardier invested in a series of support facilities throughout the world.

The American operator Delta Connection was a major source of orders for the CRJ200 early on; during April 2000, it was announced that the airline had placed a $10 billion order for 500 CRJs to meet its needs and its subsidiaries, these were a combination of CRJ200s and CRJ700s. According to Flight International, during early 2000, Delta was operating more regional jets than any other North American airline. By June 2003, the airliner operated a fleet of 223 CRJs and was ordering yet more of the type. Delta's influence on the fortunes of the CRJ program was significant, during late 2004, when Bombardier announced an incoming cut in the type's production rate, amongst the reasons given was a delay in anticipated orders for additional CRJ200s. A CRJ200ER delivered in 2003 had a $21 million value.

The American holding company Pinnacle Airlines Corporation operated a fleet of CRJ200s. Outfitted with a 44-seat configuration, designated as the CRJ440, these aircraft had closets in the forward areas of the passenger cabin, though these were later converted to 50 seat airplanes. These modifications were designed to allow operations under their major airline contract "scope clause" which restricted major airlines' connection carriers from operating equipment carrying 50 or more passengers to guard against usurpation of Air Line Pilots Association and Allied Pilots Association pilots' union contract; these scope clauses have been since relaxed when union contracts were re-written between unions and the three remaining U.S. legacy carriers. Similarly, Comair's fleet of 40-seat CRJ200s were sold at a discounted price to discourage Comair from purchasing the less expensive and smaller Embraer 135.

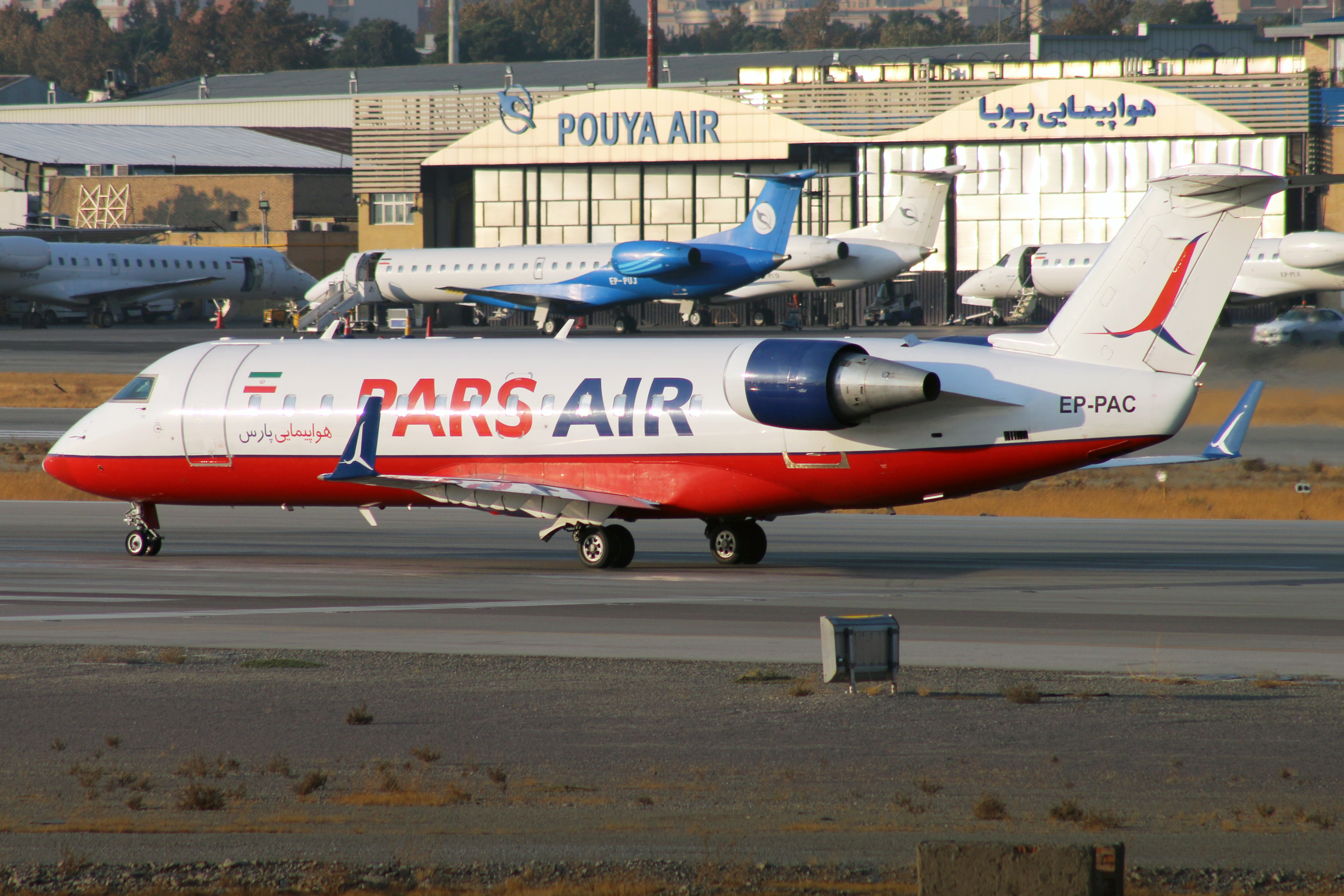
A Pars Air CRJ200 approaching Mehrabad Airport in 2023

During the middle of the 2000s, Bombardier's commercial aircraft division had incurred persistent operational losses, which motivated management to initiate restructuring and cost-cutting efforts. As such, during 2004, repeated cuts to the production rate of the CRJ100/200 series were announced in conjunction with declining market forecasts, which had the effect of narrowing the division's losses. The company soon adopted a new market strategy, prioritising the newer and larger CRJ700 and its direct derivatives over other products, such as its turboprop range and the older CRJ100 and CRJ200 models that had spawned them. During early 2006, Bombardier terminated its activity on the CRJ program and the production line was closed down; according to Pierre Beaudoin, president and chief operating officer at Bombardier Aerospace, the decision was difficult but necessary for profitability.

By 2013, fuel costs have made smaller 50-seat regional jets uneconomical on many US routes, accelerating the retirement of young CRJ100/200s, and lowering the ERJ-135/145 values. The last aircraft delivered had a value of $22 million, falling to $2 million 13 years later due to their operator concentration in the US.

In 2026, United Airlines and SkyWest Airlines announced a CRJ450 conversion program. These CRJ200 aircraft are configured with a two-class cabin seating 41 passengers, including 7 in first class. First class features a dedicated luggage closet in place of overhead bins, while the economy class cabin includes enlarged overhead bins capable of accommodating roll-aboard luggage. The aircraft are also equipped with high-speed satellite Internet using Starlink's Low Earth orbit constellation. By 2028, more than 50 aircraft are expected to be operated by SkyWest for United Express.

== Variants ==
Several models of the CRJ have been produced, ranging in capacity from 40 to 50 passengers. The Regional Jet designations are marketing names and the official designation is CL-600-2B19.

=== CRJ100 ===
The CRJ100 is the original 50-seat version. It is equipped with General Electric CF34-3A1 engines.

CRJ100SF
Passenger-to-freighter conversion of CRJ100.

CRJ100LR
Long range version of CRJ100. Launch customer: Lufthansa Cityline.

CRJ100SE
Executive passenger conversion of CRJ100.

=== CRJ200 ===
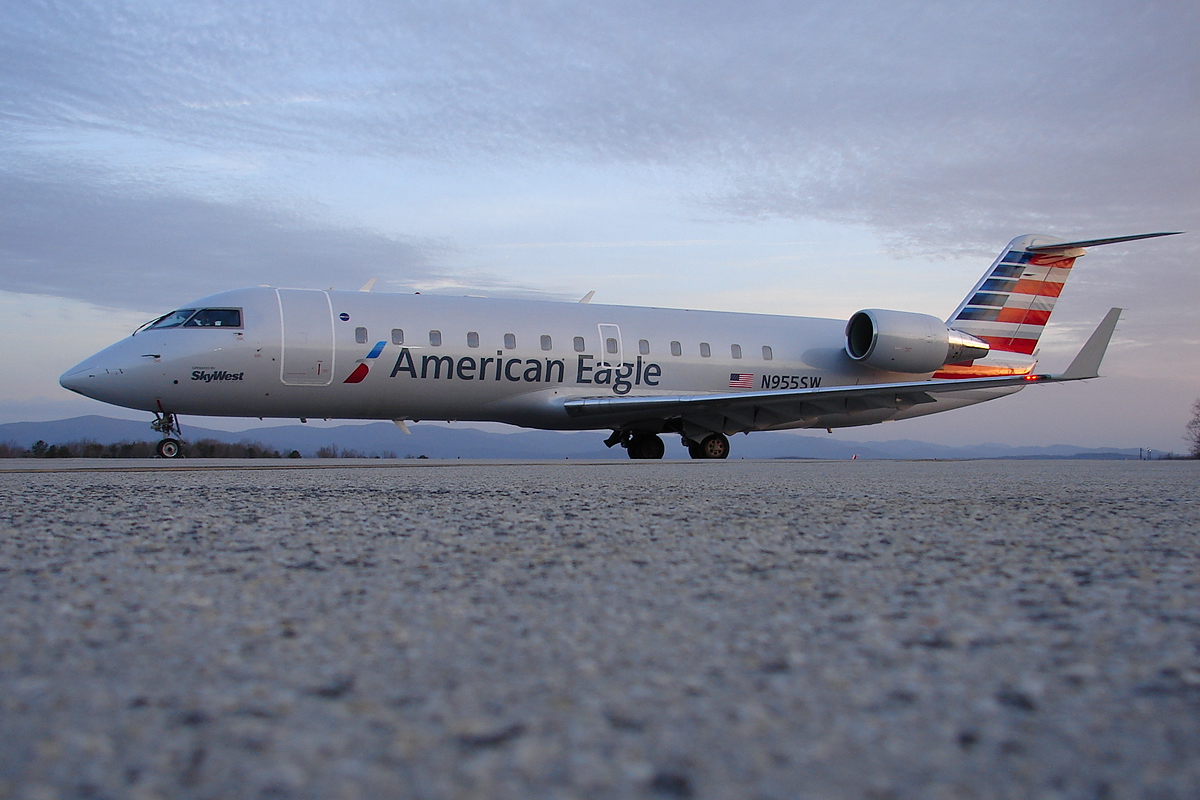
American Eagle CRJ200 at Charlottesville–Albemarle Airport in 2014.

The CRJ200 is identical to the CRJ100 except for its engines, which were upgraded to the CF34-3B1 model, offering improved efficiency. Launch customer SkyWest received its first in 1994.

CRJ200PF
Package freighter version of CRJ200.

CRJ200LR
Long range version of CRJ200.

CRJ200SF
Passenger-to-freighter conversion of CRJ200.

=== Other aircraft ===
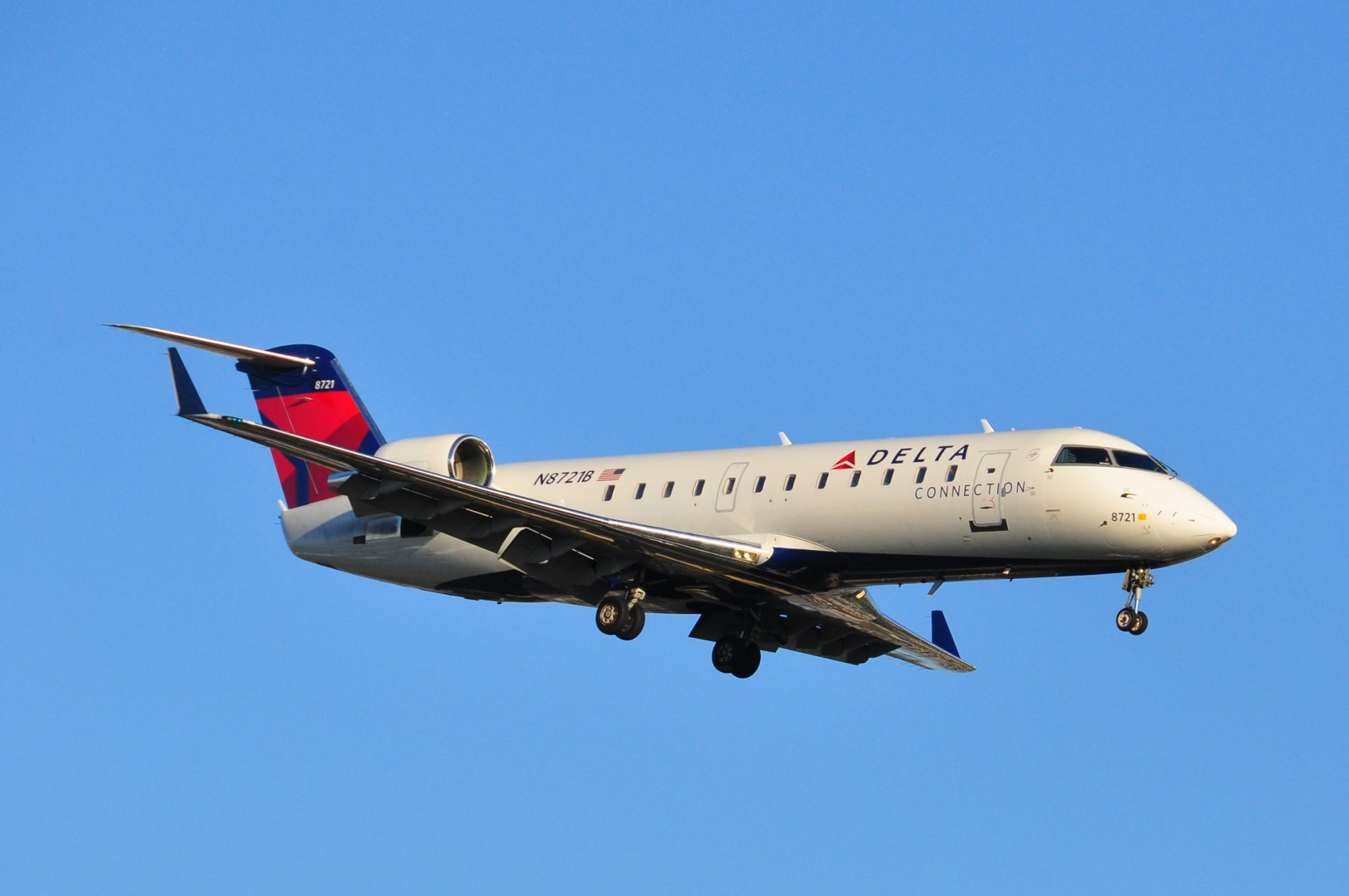
Delta Connection CRJ440 in 2010.

CRJ440
CRJ200 certified with 44 seats to meet the scope clause needs of some airlines in the United States.

CRJ450
CRJ200 with 41 seats in two classes (7 first and 34 economy). This is a marketing name, no type certificate was needed. Operated by SkyWest for United Express.

Challenger 800/850
A business jet variant of the CRJ200.

== Operators ==
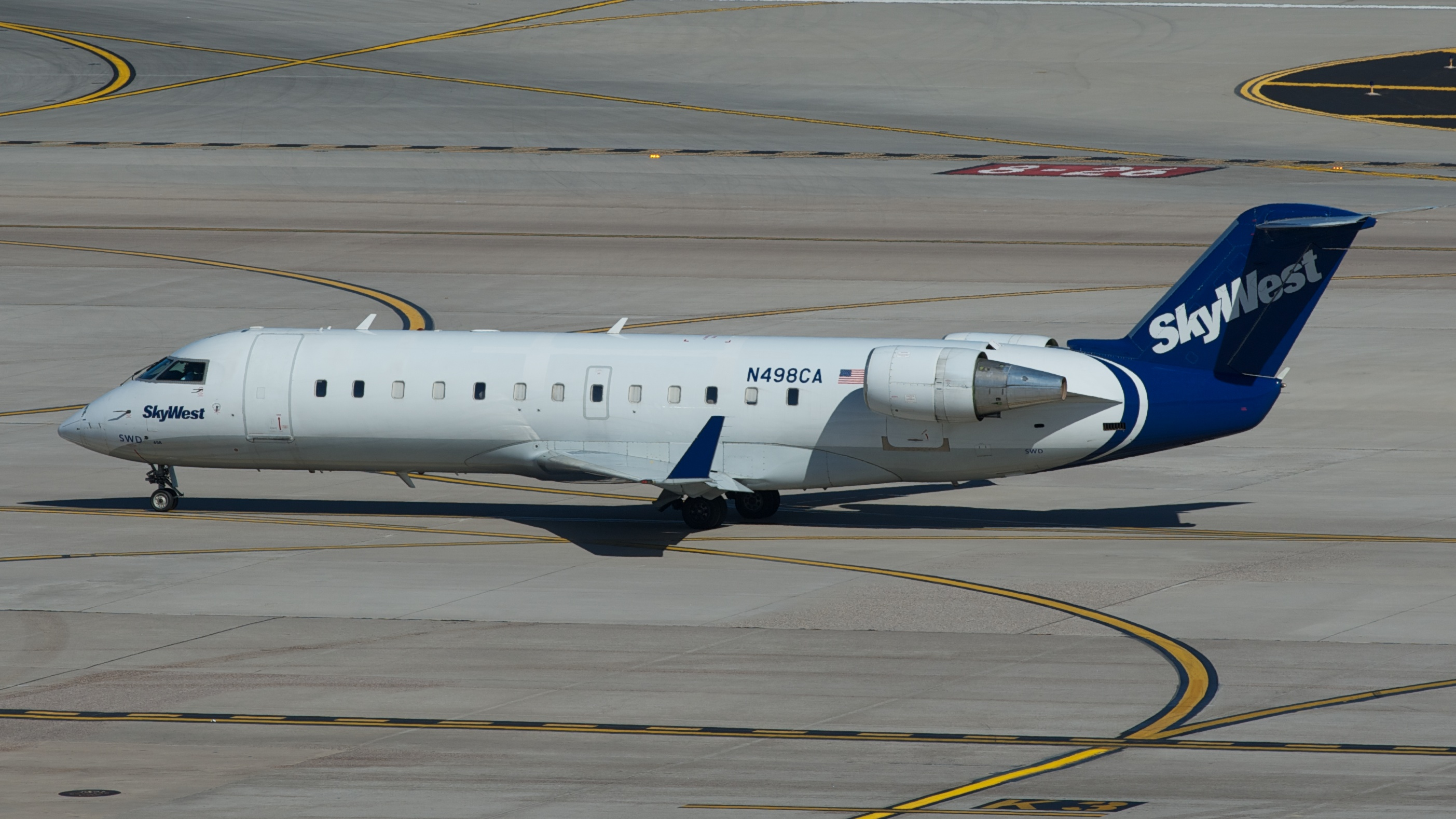
SkyWest Airlines is the largest CRJ200 operator.

As of 2015, 1021 CRJ100/200 had been ordered and delivered: 226 CRJ100s, 709 CRJ200s and 86 CRJ440s.

In July 2018, 498 CRJ100/200 were in airline service: 407 in North America, 58 in Europe, 16 in Africa, 16 in Asia Pacific and 1 in the Middle East. Operators with 10 or more CRJ100/200 aircraft are SkyWest Airlines (136), Air Wisconsin (62) and RusLine (14).

== Aircraft on display ==
Numerous retired CRJ200 aircraft are used in aircraft maintenance technician (AMT) training programs. The following aircraft were donated by SkyWest Airlines:

- N417SW is in use by Rock Valley College at Chicago Rockford International Airport.
- N903SW is in use by San Joaquin Valley College at Fresno Yosemite International Airport.
- N905SW is in use by Salt Lake Community College at Salt Lake City International Airport.
- N594SW is in use by Pima Community College at Tucson International Airport.
- N863AS is in use by Southern Utah University at Cedar City Regional Airport.

== Accidents and incidents ==
=== Accidents with fatalities ===
- 26 July 1993: Bombardier Aerospace Flight 388, a prototype Canadair CRJ100, aircraft registration C-FCRJ, crashed in Byers, Kansas, after entering a deep stall and rolling inverted during a test flight. Attempting to recover, the copilot deployed the anti-spin parachute but it immediately detached from the aircraft, and the ensuing crash killed all three aircraft occupants: both pilots and a flight test engineer. The accident was attributed to the pilot's unexplained failure to cease a lateral stability test maneuver once the stick shaker actuated, and the crew's failure to correctly configure the anti-spin chute system earlier in the flight. A contributing factor was improper design of the chute system, which allowed the chute to deploy while the retaining hooks were unlocked.
- 22 June 2003: Brit Air Flight 5672, a CRJ100ER, crashed short and to the left of the runway when attempting to land at Brest-Guipavas Airport. The aircraft's captain was the sole fatality.
- 14 October 2004: Pinnacle Airlines Flight 3701, a CRJ200, crashed on a repositioning flight from Little Rock National Airport to Minneapolis-Saint Paul International Airport after the pilots attempted to climb to the aircraft's published service ceiling, exceeding the aircraft's capabilities for the existing conditions and resulting in the flameout of both engines and core lock in one engine. The aircraft crashed near Jefferson City Memorial Airport in Missouri during the ensuing emergency landing attempt, killing both pilots.
- 21 November 2004: China Eastern Airlines Flight 5210, a CRJ200LR, crashed shortly after takeoff from Baotou Donghe Airport in Inner Mongolia, killing all 53 on board and two on the ground.
- 27 August 2006: Comair Flight 5191, a CRJ100ER, crashed during takeoff from the wrong runway at Blue Grass Airport in Lexington, Kentucky. There were 49 fatalities, with only the severely injured first officer surviving.
- 12 November 2009: RwandAir Flight 205, a CRJ100, crashed into a VIP terminal shortly after an emergency landing at Kigali International Airport in Rwanda; out of the ten passengers and five crew members, one passenger died.
- 4 April 2011: Georgian Airways Flight 834, a CRJ100ER on a United Nations mission crashed in bad weather at N'djili Airport in the Democratic Republic of the Congo, breaking into pieces and catching fire. Of the 29 passengers and 4 crew, only one person survived.
- 29 January 2013: SCAT Airlines Flight 760 crashed 5 km (3.1 mi) short of Almaty International Airport near the village of Kyzyltu, Kazakhstan, while attempting to land in bad weather. 16 passengers and 5 crew died.
- 8 January 2016: West Air Sweden Flight 294, a CRJ200-PF cargo flight en route to Tromsø, Norway, crashed in a remote area of northern Sweden after the pilots lost control while attempting to react to incorrect attitude information provided by malfunctioning equipment. The two pilots, the only occupants of the aircraft, were killed.
- 24 July 2024: A 21-year-old Saurya Airlines CRJ200 with 17 passengers and 2 crew crashed on takeoff at 11:14 AM local time at Tribhuvan International Airport, Nepal, killing everyone on board except the captain, who received non-life-threatening injuries.

=== Hull losses ===
- 16 December 1997: Air Canada Flight 646, a CRJ100, crashed during a go-around at Greater Fredericton Airport in Fredericton, New Brunswick. The aircraft was destroyed but no fatalities were reported.
- 20 May 2007: an Air Canada Jazz Bombardier CRJ100 operating as Flight 8911, C-FRIL, was damaged beyond repair when its landing gear collapsed at Toronto-Pearson International Airport. The Transportation Safety Board of Canada (TSB) found that the inexperienced first officer mishandled the first touchdown and caused the aircraft to bounce, and as the captain initiated a second touchdown while still over the runway, the jet's automated ground lift dump (GLD) system—triggered by the first touchdown, the idle thrust setting, and the very low altitude—fully deployed the spoilers, causing a hard landing that broke both main landing gear trunnions. The pilots were able to maintain directional control and stop the aircraft safely; there were no injuries to the crew, while some passengers suffered minor injuries. The TSB attributed the accident to pilot error, faulting the pilots for not initiating a go-around, with improper landing gear maintenance being a contributing factor. The TSB recommended that operators better inform CRJ pilots of the dangers of inadvertent GLD actuation and the resultant importance of initiating a go-around after a bounced touchdown.
- 13 February 2008: Belavia Flight 1834, a CRJ100LR, flipped over during takeoff at Zvartnots International Airport in Yerevan, Armenia, and burned out. Most passengers suffered minor burns and four were taken to the hospital; no fatalities were reported.
- 17 July 2012: A suspended SkyWest Airlines pilot and fugitive murder suspect, Brian Hedglin, whose ex-girlfriend had been found stabbed to death at his Colorado Springs residence, stole a parked SkyWest CRJ200ER, N865AS, at St. George Regional Airport in Utah. He clipped a jet bridge and the terminal building, then taxied it through a fence and into a parking lot, crashing into several parked cars, and shot himself dead in the aircraft aisle. There was no one else aboard the aircraft and no reported injuries to anyone but Hedglin.

== Specifications ==
CRJ Specifications
Variant	CRJ100	CRJ200
Cockpit crew	Two	
Seating capacity	50	
Cabin height	6 ft 1 in (1.85 m)	
Cabin width	8 ft 3 in (2.53 m)	
Length	87 ft 10 in (26.77 m)	
Wingspan	69 ft 6 in (21.18 m)	
Height	20 ft 8 in (6.30 m)	
Wing area	520.4 sq ft (48.35 m^{2})	
Fuselage diameter	8 ft 10 in (2.69 m)	
Operating empty	30,500 lb (13,835 kg)	
Max. payload	13,500 lb (6,124 kg)	
Max. fuel	2,135 US gal (8,081 L; 1,778 imp gal); 14,305 lb (6,489 kg)	
Max Take Off	LR: 53,000 lb (24,041 kg); ER: 51,000 lb (23,133 kg)	
Engines (2x)	GE CF34-3A1	GE CF34-3B1
Takeoff thrust (2x)	8,729 lbf (38.84 kN)	
Range	LR: 1,650 nmi (3,056 km; 1,900 mi); ER: 1,305 nmi (2,417 km; 1,502 mi)	LR: 1,700 nmi (3,148 km; 2,000 mi); ER: 1,345 nmi (2,491 km; 1,548 mi)
Normal cruise	Mach .74 (424 kn; 786 km/h; 488 mph)	
High-speed cruise	Mach .81 (465 kn; 860 km/h; 535 mph)	
Service ceiling	41,000 ft (12,496 m)	
Takeoff (SL, ISA, MTOW)	LR: 6,290 ft (1,920 m); ER: 5,800 ft (1,770 m)	
Landing (SL, MLW)	4,850 ft (1,480 m)	

== See also ==
Related development

- Bombardier Challenger 600
- Bombardier CRJ700

Aircraft of comparable role, configuration, and era

- Embraer ERJ 145 family
- Fairchild Dornier 328JET

Related lists

- List of jet airliners
- List of civil aircraft
- List of Bombardier CRJ operators
