= Pinnacle Airlines Flight 3701 =

2004 aviation accident in Missouri

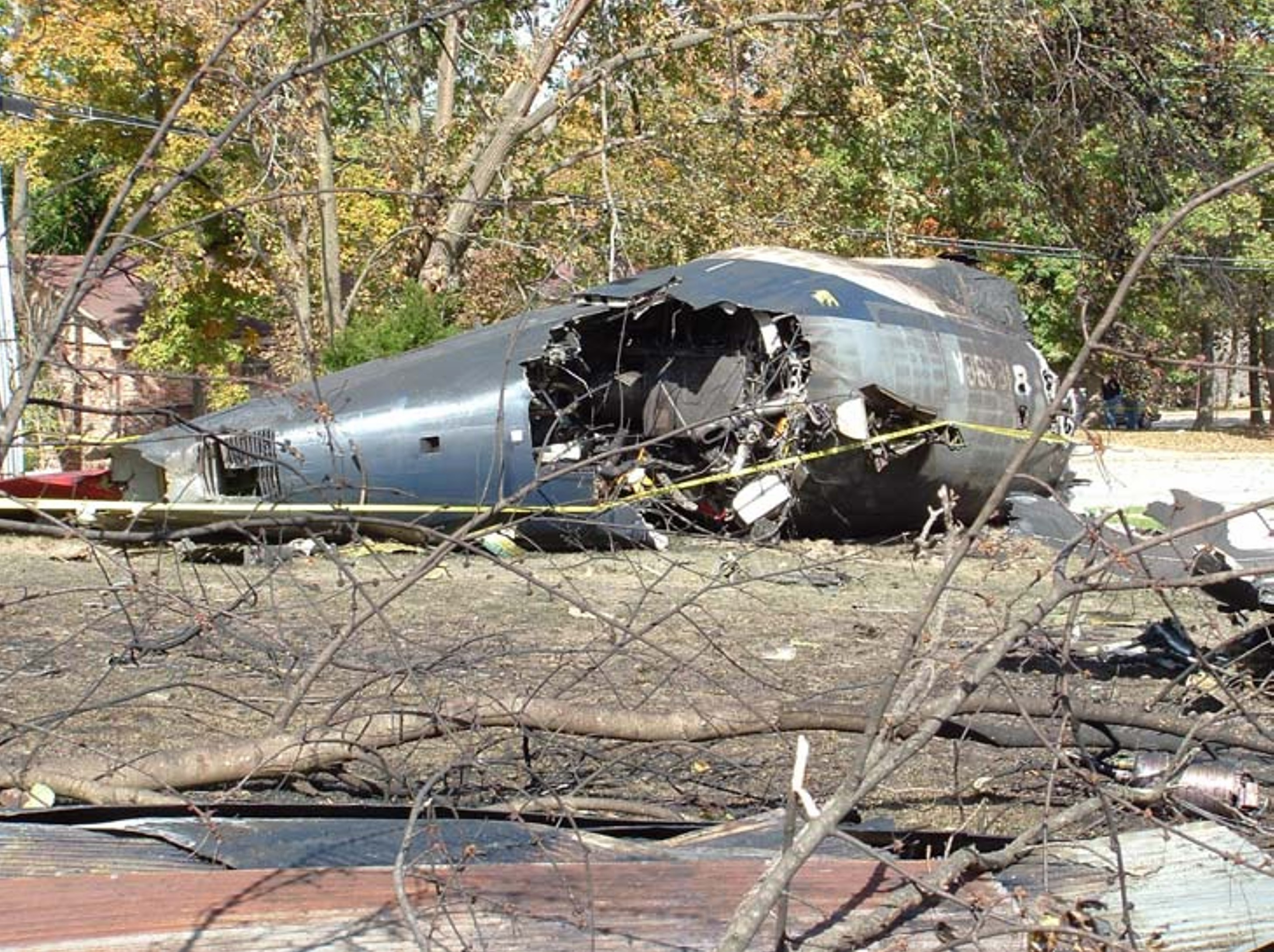
- The burnt-out wreckage of Flight 3701

Accident
- Date: October 14, 2004
- Summary: Stall and dual engine flameout due to poor airmanship
- Site: Near Jefferson City Memorial Airport, Jefferson City, Missouri, United States; 38°32′57″N 92°8′36″W

Aircraft
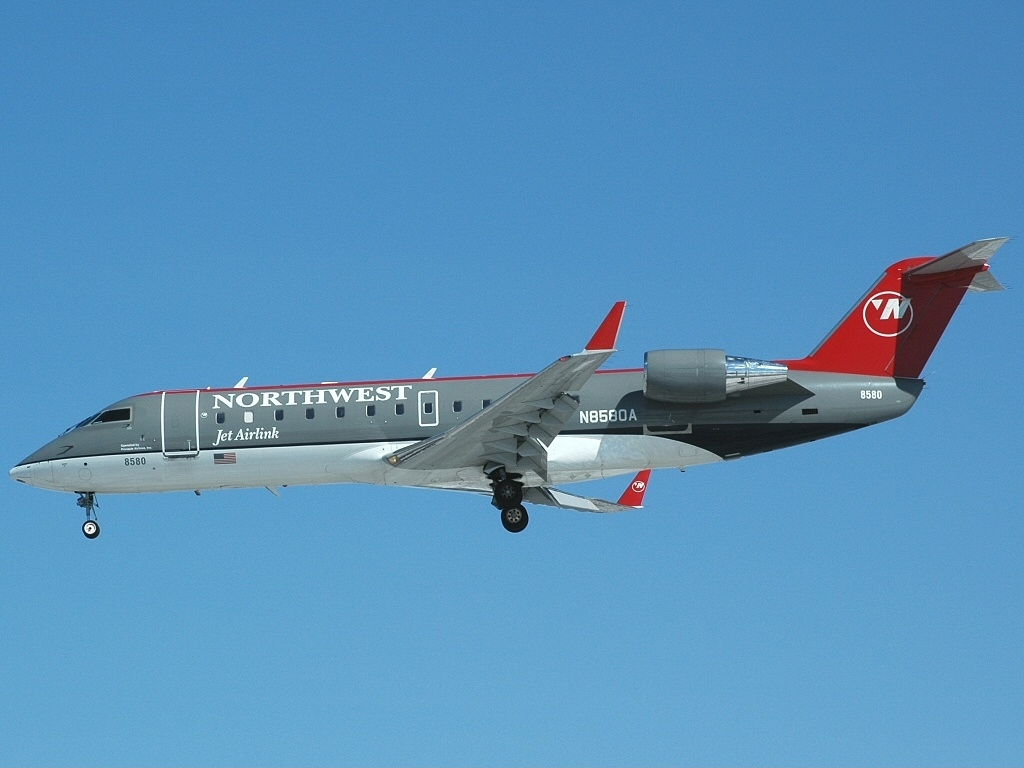
- A Northwest Airlink CRJ200 similar to the accident aircraft
- Aircraft type: Bombardier CRJ200
- Operator: Pinnacle Airlines (d/b/a Northwest Airlink)
- IATA flight No.: 9E3701
- ICAO flight No.: FLG3701
- Call sign: FLAGSHIP 3701
- Registration: N8396A
- Flight origin: Clinton National Airport, Little Rock, Arkansas, United States
- Destination: Minneapolis–Saint Paul International Airport, Minneapolis, Minnesota, United States
- Occupants: 2
- Crew: 2
- Fatalities: 2
- Survivors: 0

On October 14, 2004, Pinnacle Airlines Flight 3701, a Bombardier CRJ200 on a repositioning flight (Note: A repositioning flight is a flight operated to move an aircraft from one location to another without passengers aboard.) from Little Rock to Minneapolis, crashed while attempting an emergency approach to Jefferson City Memorial Airport in Missouri, United States. Both pilots, the only two people on board, were killed. The aircraft was originally scheduled to fly a passenger flight from Little Rock to Minneapolis earlier that day, but a mechanical issue forced the flight to be delayed. Since the aircraft was still needed for Pinnacle Airlines operations out of Minneapolis the next day, the airline elected to ferry the aircraft to Minneapolis. The two pilots made the aircraft climb to 41,000 ft (12,000 m), the maximum operating altitude of the CRJ200. Due to the weight of the aircraft at that altitude, the thrust available could not maintain the required airspeed. Due to the low energy state with maximum power, it slowly slowed down and subsequently stalled, resulting in turbulent airflow to both engines, which flamed out. The crew failed to execute the proper dual engine failure checklists and did not glide the aircraft to a suitable airport. The plane crashed in a residential area short of the runway and was destroyed.

The investigation, conducted by the National Transportation Safety Board, found several factors led to the accident. Investigators found that during the flight the crew had intentionally deviated from standard operating procedures, displayed unprofessional cockpit attitude, and aggressively maneuvered the aircraft. In particular, investigators discovered that Pinnacle Airlines flight crews had expressed curiosity in flying at the CRJ200's service ceiling and pilots who had done so informally called it the "410 club". Data from the flight recorders indicated that the crew did not anticipate the upset and improperly executed the checklist procedures. The crew did not effectively communicate with air traffic control about their emergency situation and did not fully discuss potential landing sites. Investigators also determined that the engines core locked prior to the accident, which prevented the crew from restarting them, and the available documentation provided to the crew did not communicate the importance of preventing core lock.

== Background ==
=== Aircraft ===
The aircraft involved in the accident was a Bombardier CRJ200, registered as N8396A. By the time of the accident, it had a total of 10,168 airframe hours and 9,613 flights. (Note: The NTSB defines a flight cycle as "one complete takeoff and landing sequence.") Pinnacle Airlines acquired the airframe in May 2000, soon after it was manufactured. The aircraft was powered by two General Electric CF34-3B1 turbofan engines. The certified maximum operating altitude of the CRJ200 is 41,000 ft (12,000 m). The aircraft was equipped with an auxiliary power unit (APU), which provides power to the aircraft when the engines are not operating. An engine restart can be conducted by using bleed air from the APU to rotate the engine core. The Bombardier CRJ200 is equipped with a stick shaker, which warns the crew of an impending stall, and a stick pusher, which pitches the aircraft down to prevent a stall.

=== Crew ===
On the day of the accident, the aircraft was operating a repositioning flight flown by two pilots. The captain was 31-year-old Jesse Rhodes. Rhodes graduated from the Embry–Riddle Aeronautical University in Florida in 1995 and began working as a flight instructor there between 1996 and 1999. He was hired by Pinnacle Airlines in February 2004. By the time of the accident, he had a total of 6,900 flight hours, 973 of which were on the CRJ. Pilots who had previously flown with Rhodes had given favorable comments to him and the simulator instructor responsible for his upgrade training stated that he flew the plane "just fine" but noted deficiencies in critical decision-making and judgement.

The first officer of the flight was 23-year-old Peter Cesarz. Cesarz began training to become a first officer in October 2002 and was hired by Pinnacle Airlines in April 2004. By the time of the accident, he had accumulated 761 flight hours in total, 222 of which on the CRJ. Captains who had flown with Cesarz described him as a confident pilot and a simulator instructor stated that he had a positive attitude.

=== Operator ===
At the time of the accident, Pinnacle Airlines was a regional airline and subsidiary of Northwest Airlines. The airline was initially founded in 1985 as Express Airlines I with turboprop aircraft only. The airline began to expand its fleet with CRJ aircraft in 2001, and changed its name to Pinnacle Airlines the following year. At the time of the accident, the airline employed approximately 900 pilots and had a fleet of 110 CRJ aircraft. Pinnacle Airlines was doing business as (d/b/a) Northwest Airlink, the regional commuter service for Northwest Airlines. The airline gave training on upsets, high-altitude climbs, dual engine failures, stalls, and crew resource management. Training on high-altitude climbs included discussion on flight at 41,000 ft (12,000 m), but operations at this altitude were not demonstrated in simulator training. Flight crew operating manuals from the airline instructed crews flying above 36,000 ft (11,000 m) to maintain a minimum climb airspeed of 250 kn (460 km/h) and a rate-of-climb of at least 300 ft/min (91 m/min). The airline's checklist instructed crews after a dual engine failure to maintain an airspeed of 240 kn (440 km/h) before attempting an engine restart, and once at or below an altitude of 21,000 ft (6,400 m), increase the airspeed to 300 kn (560 km/h) to initiate a windmill restart. The Federal Aviation Administration's (FAA) Flight Standards District Office in Memphis, Tennessee, was responsible for overseeing Pinnacle Airlines.

At Pinnacle Airlines, there was an unofficial group of Bombardier CRJ pilots who had flown the aircraft up to its service ceiling of 41,000 ft (12,000 m) or flight level 410, informally referred to as the "410 club". Testimony of pilots who had climbed to flight level 410 indicated that these climbs were conducted on repositioning flights. Before the crash of Flight 3701, management at the airline, including the chief pilot, the vice president of safety, and the CRJ program manager, were unaware of the club's existence.

=== Power curve ===
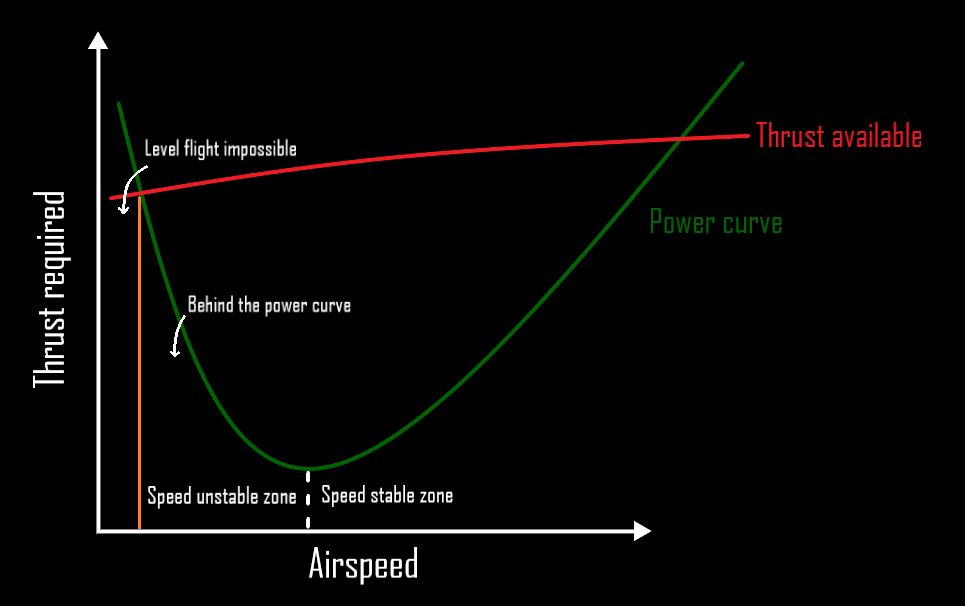
A graph showing the power curve, with airspeed on the x-axis and thrust required on the y-axis

The power curve relates the airspeed of an aircraft in level flight to the engine thrust required. On a graph with airspeed on the x-axis and thrust required on the y-axis, the power curve is an upward-opening curve where a given thrust is required to maintain a certain airspeed. In order to maintain the same altitude, an aircraft must balance thrust with drag. An aircraft requires more thrust to fly at higher airspeeds as the parasitic drag increases. "Falling behind the power curve" is a situation that can happen to an aircraft when it begins to fly slower while maintaining the same altitude. In order to maintain constant lift (and thus altitude) while decelerating, the aircraft must increase in angle of attack (AoA). The increase in AoA results in induced drag increasing. As drag increases, airspeed decreases, necessitating an even higher AoA to maintain altitude. Therefore, more thrust would be required to maintain the high AoA at the lower airspeed. If the airspeed becomes too low and the available engine thrust falls below what is required to maintain a certain airspeed, level flight becomes impossible.

== Accident ==
=== Pre-flight and departure ===
On October 14, 2004, N8396A was scheduled to fly from Adams Field in Little Rock, Arkansas, to Minneapolis–Saint Paul International Airport in Minneapolis, Minnesota. The crew of that flight, who were different from the accident flight, received a caution message relating to a bleed air duct fault and rejected the takeoff. However, Pinnacle Airlines still needed the aircraft in Minneapolis the following day, where the airplane's next flight was scheduled. The airline notified Captain Rhodes and First Officer Cesarz about the repositioning flight they planned the pilots to fly. The pilots arrived in Little Rock by use of deadheading on company flights and began preparing for the flight.

Flight 3701 departed Little Rock for Minneapolis at 21:21 with a flight plan that indicated a planned cruising pressure altitude of 33,000 feet (10,000 m). Five seconds after takeoff at an altitude of 450 ft (140 m), the crew conducted an abrupt pitch maneuver. The pitch of the aircraft rose to 22° nose-up and the vertical load on the airframe increased to 1.8 Gs. This resulted in the activation of the stick shaker followed soon after by the stick pusher. The pitch angle was subsequently reduced and the crew continued to climb.

Soon before 21:26 as the airplane was climbing through 14,000 ft (4,300 m), the autopilot was engaged. Captain Rhodes and First Officer Cesarz then swapped cockpit seating positions, with Rhodes sitting in the right seat and Cesarz sitting in the left seat assuming the role of pilot flying. Twenty seconds later while at 15,000 ft (4,600 m), the autopilot was disengaged and the crew once again put the aircraft into a climb and brought the nose up to 17°, exerting a load of 2.3 Gs, and resulting in a temporary climb rate of 10,000 ft/min (3,000 m/min). They then made a series of rudder inputs ranging between a left input 4.2° and a right input of 7.7°. Four minutes later at 24,600 ft (7,500 m), the crew conducted another pitch-up maneuver resulting in a 10° nose-up attitude and loading of 1.87 Gs.

=== Climb to 41,000 feet and upset ===
While the plane was at approximately 32,000 ft (9,800 m), Captain Rhodes requested permission from air traffic control (ATC) to climb to 41,000 ft (12,000 m), the service ceiling of the CRJ. After receiving clearance from ATC, the crew began to climb to 41,000 ft (12,000 m). The crew used the autopilot to conduct the climb. Rather than specifying an airspeed for the autopilot to maintain, the crew set the autopilot to vertical speed mode with a commanded rate of climb of 500 ft/min (150 m/min). The autopilot began to change the pitch of the aircraft to achieve a rate of climb of 500 ft/min (150 m/min) while the airspeed decreased from a starting value of 203 kn (376 km/h).

The cockpit voice recording (CVR) began around 21:44, capturing conversation between Rhodes and Cesarz about the ongoing climb to 41,000 ft (12,000 m). The crew engaged in casual conversation and made jokes with each other. Cesarz commented to Rhodes that they were about to "41-it," to which Rhodes responded a minute later "40,000 baby". Soon before the aircraft reached 41,000 ft (12,000 m), the first officer laughed and said "There's my 41-0 man. Made it man." At 21:52, Rhodes asked Cesarz if he wanted something to drink, to which Cesarz responded that he wanted a soda. The captain left the first officer in the cockpit and came back with cans of Pepsi and joked about drinking beer. The air traffic controller monitoring the flight in Kansas City found the flight's high altitude unusual and asked the pilots whether they were flying a CRJ-200.

21:53:42	Air traffic controller	Flagship thirty seven zero one are you a [C]RJ two hundred?
21:53:47	Captain Rhodes	Thirty seven zero one that's affirmative.
21:53:50	Air traffic controller	I've never seen you guys up at forty one there.
21:53:51	Captain Rhodes	Yeah we're actually a ah. There's ah. We don't we don't have any passengers on board so we decided to have a little fun and come on up here.
21:53:58	Air traffic controller	I gotcha.
21:53:59	Captain Rhodes	This is our actually our service ceiling.

By 21:54, the airspeed had reduced to 150 kn (280 km/h). Rhodes commented to Cesarz that they were "gonna be ... coming down in a second here." He contacted air traffic control and requested a lower altitude, and the controller began coordinating the descent. Soon after at 21:54:36, the stick shaker activated as the AoA increased to 7.5°. Between 21:54:45 and 21:54:54, the stick shaker and stick pusher activated three times. The crew overrode the stick pusher all three times. The pitch of the aircraft varied between 7° nose up and 20° nose down. At the end of the fifth stick shaker activation and fourth stick pusher activation, the AoA increased to beyond the maximum measurable value of 27° and the pitch increased to 29°. The aircraft subsequently stalled, rolled 82° to the left, and pitched down to 32°. Both engines then flamed out.

=== Gliding and crash ===
After the aircraft stalled, the captain declared an emergency to ATC. The crew managed to execute a stall recovery maneuver and the airplane recovered from the upset at 34,000 ft (10,000 m). Shortly after, the aircraft suffered a total loss of AC power due to the failure of both engines, temporarily cutting power to the flight data recorder (FDR). The air-driven generator then deployed, supplying a limited amount of power to some aircraft systems. Among the systems powered included the left-hand side cockpit instruments, where First Officer Cesarz was seated. Captain Rhodes did not verbalize the double-engine failure until thirty seconds after the upset, and it took another minute for the crew to begin running through the checklist.

When the FDR resumed recording at 21:59 while the aircraft was passing through 29,000 ft (8,800 m), it showed that the APU was activated and supplying limited power to the aircraft. One minute later, Captain Rhodes told Cesarz to increase the airspeed to 300 kn (560 km/h), which he acknowledged. However, Cesarz did not pitch the nose down enough to increase the airspeed to 300 kn (560 km/h); the airspeed only increased to 236 kn (437 km/h) before decreasing. The captain then told the first officer that he intended to do an APU bleed air engine restart once they descended to 13,000 ft (4,000 m). At 22:03, the air traffic controller asked the crew about the nature of their emergency. Captain Rhodes lied to air traffic control, telling them that only one engine had failed and they were descending to "start our other engine". Over the next several minutes, the crew conducted four engine restart attempts using APU bleed air, all of which failed to rotate the cores. The crew members returned to their correct seat positions at 22:08.

One minute later and fourteen minutes after the upset, First Officer Cesarz told air traffic control that both engines had indeed failed and that the crew needed vectors to the nearest airport. The controller provided information for an approach to Jefferson City Memorial Airport and attempted to guide the crew to visually find the airport. At 22:14 and after the first officer told the captain that he had the runway in sight, Rhodes replied, "we're not gonna make this," and "is there a road? We're not gonna make this runway." The enhanced ground proximity warning system then gave aural alerts of the terrain as the aircraft's altitude decreased, announcing "too low terrain," and "pull up." Captain Rhodes's final words before impact were "ah shit, we're going to hit the houses there, dude." The left wing then impacted a tree, causing the aircraft to roll left, inverted, and crash into the ground 2.5 mi (4.0 km) south of the runway. Both pilots were killed on impact, and the aircraft was destroyed by the crash and fire. No one on the ground was injured.

== Investigation ==
The investigation into the accident was conducted by the National Transportation Safety Board (NTSB). The Transportation Safety Board of Canada, representing the state of aircraft design and manufacture, also participated in the investigation. Representatives from Pinnacle Airlines, Bombardier Aerospace, General Electric, and the FAA also were parties to the investigation.

=== Flight crew performance ===
"I think what is particularly disturbing about this accident is that the crew was intentionally noncompliant with the procedures. But I can't help wondering why this crew–an otherwise decently performing crew–would think that on [that] night they could go out and do the things that they did ... I would suggest that a safety culture is when an organization establishes an absolute expectation that employees will do the right thing even when no one is watching."

— NTSB board member Robert Sumwalt

Investigators determined that throughout the flight, the pilots displayed unprofessional behavior and poor airmanship, and intentionally deviated from standard operating procedures. The crew's abrupt pitch maneuvers during the departure and climb were not conducted for any operational or safety reason and likely placed the airplane outside of its certified flight envelope. Although the filed flight plan listed a cruising altitude of 33,000 ft (10,000 m), both pilots repeatedly expressed excitement about reaching 41,000 ft (12,000 m). Both pilots agreed to the decision to fly at 41,000 ft (12,000 m), and post-accident interviews indicated that there was a "sense of allure to some pilots" to cruise at the flight level as part of the "410 club". The NTSB concluded that the pilot's aggressive maneuvers and flight to 41,000 ft (12,000 m) were made for personal reasons rather than operational reasons. They additionally noted how since the crew were flying a repositioning flight with no one else on board, the crew had an opportunity to aggressively maneuver the aircraft and push its limits.

FDR data revealed that the crew improperly managed the climb to 41,000 ft (12,000 m). Rather than start the climb at an airspeed of 250 kn (460 km/h) like stated in the airline's manuals, the crew started the climb at 203 kn (376 km/h). Additionally, the crew conducted the climb with the autopilot set in vertical speed mode with a set rate-of-climb commanded instead of specifying an airspeed. The improper management of the climb resulted in the airspeed decaying to 163 kn (302 km/h) by the time the aircraft leveled off at 41,000 ft (12,000 m). The aircraft was on the back side of the power curve; the available thrust at the altitude was insufficient to maintain the airspeed, necessitating an increasing AoA to hold the altitude, which resulted in increased induced-drag and an even lower airspeed.

When the aircraft stalled at 41,000 ft (12,000 m), the stick pusher attempted to force the aircraft's nose down three consecutive times. Each time, the crew overrode the stick pusher by pulling the control column back rather than letting the AoA decrease. The NTSB believed that the pilots were instinctively trying to maintain altitude, which was in line with the training they received from Pinnacle Airlines. In addition, both pilots had never faced a simulator exercise involving the stick pusher. After the engines flamed out, the crew quickly declared an emergency to ATC, but took over a minute to initiate the dual engine failure checklist. Flight recorder data then showed that the crew did not accelerate the aircraft to the speed required by the checklist, causing the restart attempts to fail. The NTSB determined that Captain Rhodes did not ensure First Officer Cesarz—who was the only one that had functioning instruments—properly accelerated the aircraft enough to make a windmill restart possible. Additionally, they concluded that Cesarz's limited flying experience made him reluctant to pitch the nose down enough to increase the airspeed to 300 kn (560 km/h).

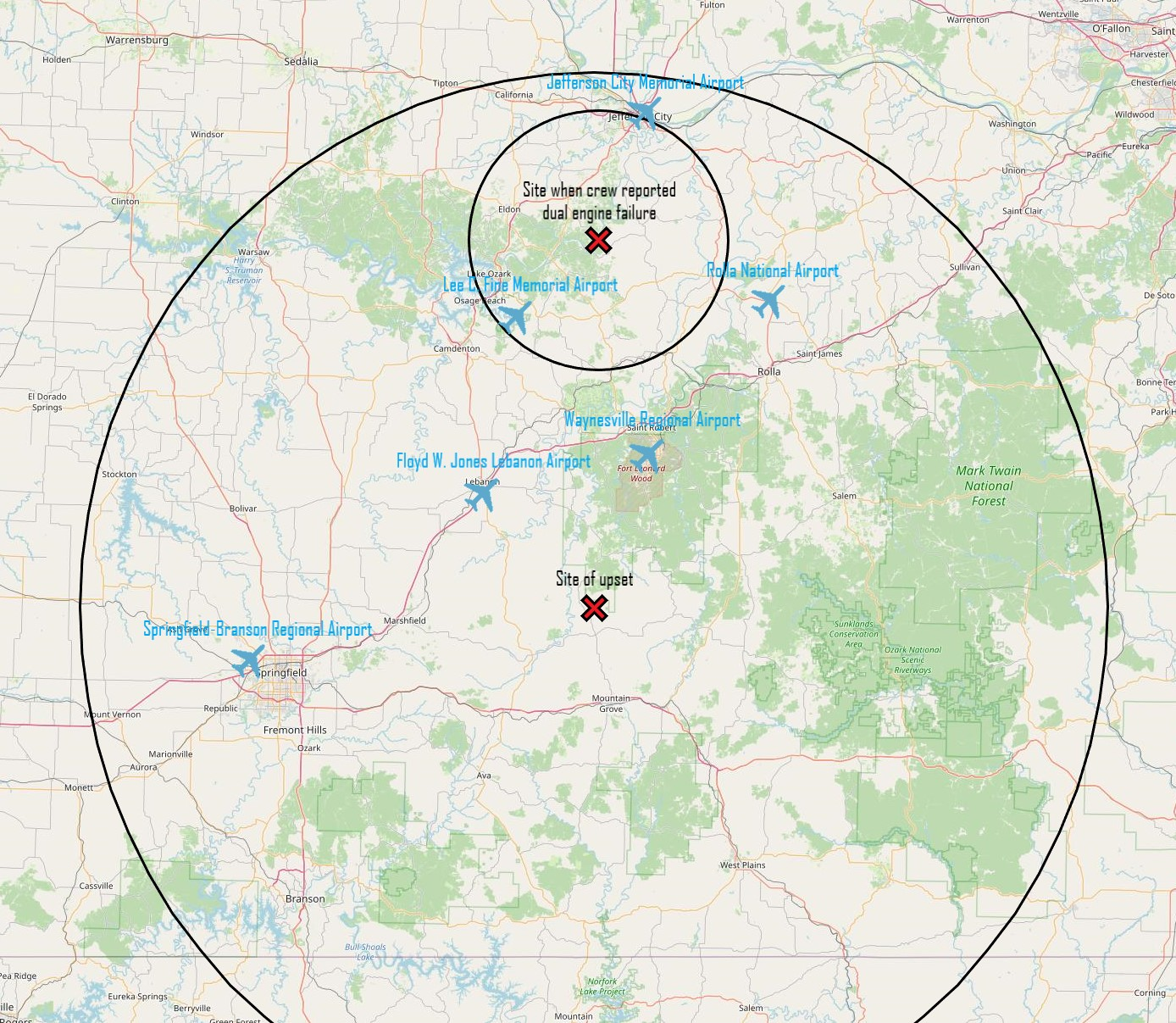
The airports within gliding range at time of the upset, and the airports within range when the crew reported the dual engine failure to ATC

At the time of the upset and engine failure, six airports were in gliding range of the aircraft: Jefferson City Memorial Airport; Waynesville Regional Airport; Floyd W. Jones Lebanon Airport; Lee C. Fine Memorial Airport; Springfield-Branson Regional Airport; and Rolla National Airport. Additionally, both crew members recognized from the start of the emergency that both engines had flamed out. However, it was only until fourteen minutes after the upset that the crew reported the dual engine failure to ATC, by which time only one airport—Lee C. Fine Memorial Airport—was still in range. The NTSB determined that Captain Rhodes knowingly gave inaccurate information to ATC, downplaying the severity of their emergency and demonstrating his reluctance to have their unprofessional behavior detected.

The NTSB concluded that the accident was the result of the crew, who "intentionally deviated from standard operating procedures and basic airmanship." They determined the crew displayed unprofessional tone and that their attitude was insufficient with the performance required to fly a regional jet. The comments the pilots made regarding the climb to 41,000 ft (12,000 m) were considered "thrill-seeking" by the NTSB. They overall concluded that the flight crew's intentionally unprofessional behavior was causal to the accident and led directly to the upset.

=== Core lock ===
During the investigation, the NTSB discovered that the General Electric CF34 engines on the CRJ had a history of failing to rotate following restart attempts on acceptance flights. Bombardier first discovered the problem in 1983 and referred to the condition as "core lock". General Electric attributed the problem to the air seal in the high-pressure turbine of the engine. The air seal is designed to control airflow through the engine. In the event of a sudden flameout at high altitudes, the different parts of the engine may cool down and contract at different rates, resulting in the air seal contacting the core enough to prevent it from rotating. On Flight 3701, the engines flamed out at both high power and high altitude, causing even more thermal differential between the interior of the engine and the cold high-altitude air. During the accident sequence, the clearance between the seal and core decreased until they made contact, causing the core to stop rotating. The binding prevented core rotation and thwarted all attempts made by the crew to restart the engines.

The immediate cause of the core lock was crew's failure to maintain an airspeed above 240 kn (440 km/h), which was the minimum airspeed on the checklist and would have kept the core rotating. However, the NTSB also criticized the flight manuals available to the pilots, which did not communicate the importance of keeping the airspeed above 240 kn (440 km/h). Checklists at Bombardier and Pinnacle Airlines stated that 240 kn (440 km/h) was the "target" airspeed but did not state how essential it was to a successful engine restart. Additionally, the NTSB believed it to be possible that the crew were attempting to fly the aircraft at its best glide speed of 170 kn (310 km/h) rather than the minimum speed needed for core rotation.

=== Training and oversight ===
The NTSB examined the training and oversight surrounding the crew and the airline. Prior to the accident, high-altitude climbs and operations as well as dual engine failures were not practiced in simulator training. The NTSB noted how employment at regional airlines was typically a step to major air carriers and that regional airlines had only recently began transitioning from turboprop to jet aircraft. They determined that throughout the regional airline industry as a whole, the training of pilots regarding high-altitude operations needed revision. At Pinnacle Airlines and across the aviation industry, stall recovery maneuvers were focused on increasing thrust, minimal altitude loss, and were conducted at low altitudes. While effective at low altitudes, powering out of a stall is ineffective at higher altitudes where excess engine thrust is low. Such maneuvers were previously determined to be ineffective during the investigation into Airborne Express Flight 827.

Before the accident, Pinnacle Airlines did not have a traditional flight operations quality assurance (FOQA) program involving routine examination of FDR data in place, nor did it have an Aviation Safety Action Program (ASAP). Rather, the FOQA program at the airline consisted of management of check airmen by flight monitoring. After the crash, Pinnacle Airlines began reviewing FDR data for non-revenue flights. Another airline with CRJs also reviewed FDR data from non-revenue flights, which showed high bank angles, steep descents, and other excessive maneuvers that pilots could not perform with passengers on board. The NTSB determined that unprofessional behavior was more common in regional airlines as they had fewer protections in place to detect and prevent unprofessional behavior, regional aircraft were often more agile than mainline carrier aircraft, and—especially during repositioning flights—pilots perceived a lower chance of the airline detecting unprofessional behavior.

=== Final report ===
On January 9, 2007, the NTSB issued its final report on the accident. In the report, they determined, "The probable causes of this accident were (1) the pilots' unprofessional behavior, deviation from standard operating procedures, and poor airmanship, which resulted in an in-flight emergency from which they were unable to recover, in part because of the pilots' inadequate training; (2) the pilots' failure to prepare for an emergency landing in a timely manner, including communicating with air traffic controllers immediately after the emergency about the loss of both engines and the availability of landing sites; and (3) the pilots' improper management of the double engine failure checklist, which allowed the engine cores to stop rotating and resulted in the core lock engine condition. Contributing to this accident were (1) the core lock engine condition, which prevented at least one engine from being restarted, and (2) the airplane flight manuals that did not communicate to pilots the importance of maintaining a minimum airspeed to keep the engine cores rotating."

The NTSB issued recommendations to the FAA regarding high-altitude flight operations, stall recovery, flight monitoring, and review on engine failures for CF34-equipped aircraft.

== Aftermath ==
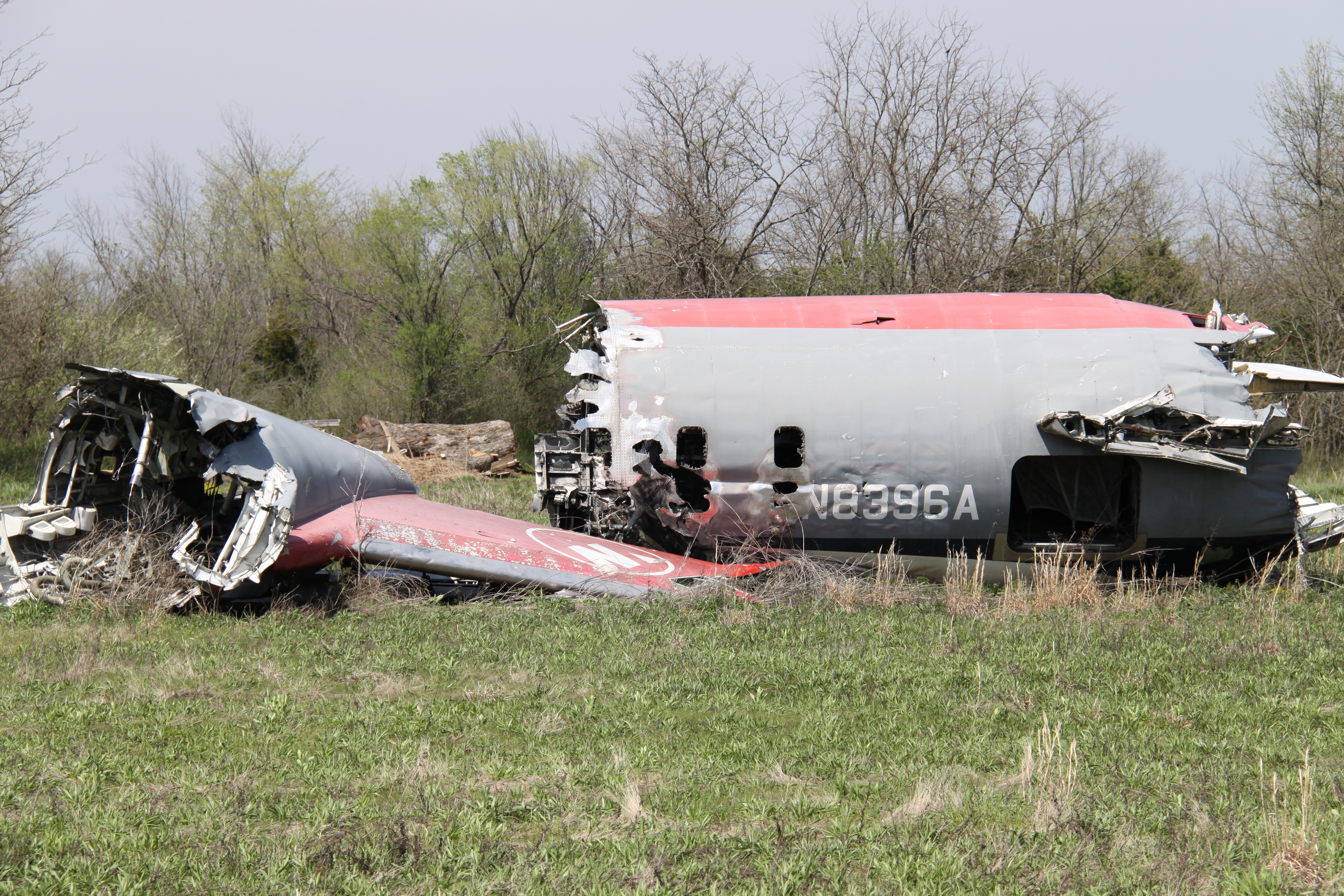
The wreckage of N8396A, stored in Rantoul, Kansas

Soon after the accident, Pinnacle Airlines restricted all CRJ200 flights to a maximum altitude of 37,000 ft (11,000 m), with the chief pilot of the airline commenting at NTSB hearings, "There is no advantage to operating above 37,000 feet." Pinnacle reiterated guidance to crews that captains and first officers were not allowed to switch seats in flight. Pinnacle gave more detailed guidance to crews about climb profiles and began incorporating stall recovery and dual engine failure training to simulator lessons. Pinnacle adopted a traditional FOQA program and instituted an ASAP into its operations. In November 2004, the airline specifically listed a minimum climb speed of 250 kn (460 km/h) above 10,000 ft (3,000 m) in its ground school instructor guide and began incorporating high-altitude climbs into simulator training. Pinnacle Airlines additionally began restructuring crew resource management training to focus on decision-making and adherences to standard operating procedures. Revised dual engine failure checklists issued in May 2005 specified that 240 kn (440 km/h) was the "minimum" airspeed for a successful restart and emphasized the altitude loss and necessary pitch required to accelerate to 300 kn (560 km/h).

Rhodes and Cesarz were both awarded the 2004 Darwin Awards, a tongue-in-cheek satirical honor given to people who die from their own actions in a manner considered idiotic.

== See also ==
- 2004 in aviation
- West Caribbean Airways Flight 708 (2005) and Air Algérie Flight 5017 (2014) – Two other accidents involving flight behind the power curve
- Colgan Air Flight 3407 (2009) – Another regional airliner crash relating to improper stall response
- United Airlines Flight 2885 (1983) and Aeroflot Flight 593 (1994) – Two other accidents involving unauthorized swapping of cockpit seat positions
