= Aeroflot Flight 6502 =

1986 Tu-134 crash in Samara

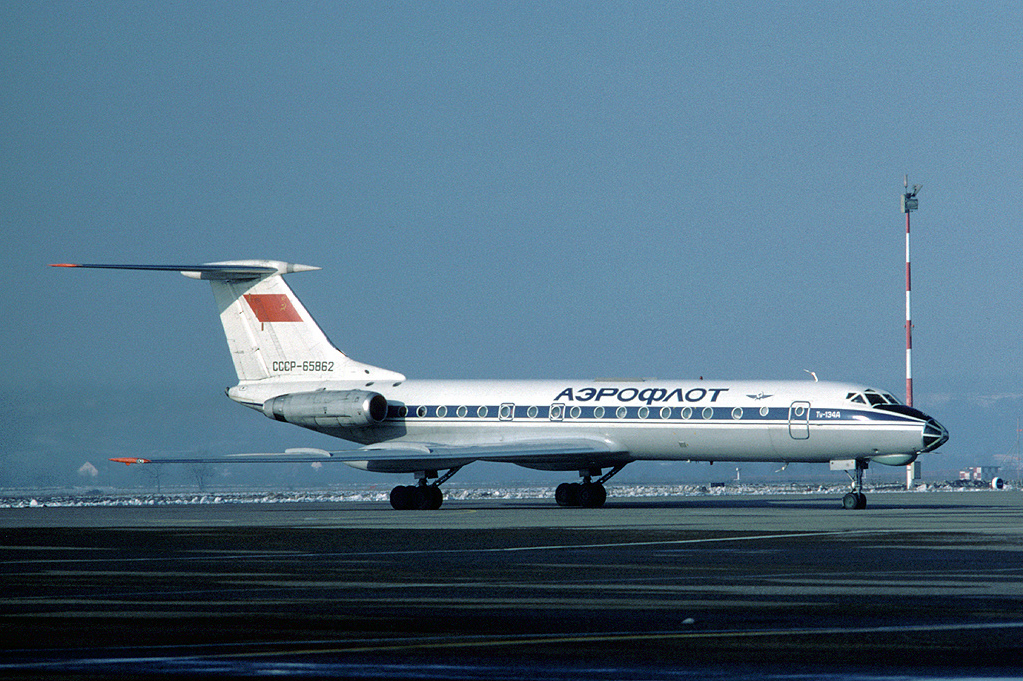
- An Aeroflot Tu-134A, similar to that involved in the accident

Accident
- Date: October 20, 1986
- Summary: Runway overrun due to pilot recklessness during landing
- Site: Kuibyshev Airport, Soviet Union; 53°29′24″N 50°11′06″E

Aircraft
- Aircraft type: Tupolev Tu-134A
- Operator: Aeroflot
- Registration: CCCP-65766
- Flight origin: Koltsovo Airport, Soviet Union
- Stopover: Kuibyshev Airport, Soviet Union
- Destination: Grozny Airport, Soviet Union
- Occupants: 94
- Passengers: 87
- Crew: 7
- Fatalities: 70
- Survivors: 24

Aeroflot Flight 6502 was a Soviet domestic passenger flight from Sverdlovsk (now Yekaterinburg) to Grozny via Kuibyshev (now Samara). On 20 October 1986, the Tupolev Tu-134A serving the flight crashed in Kuibyshev. Of the 94 passengers and crew on board, 70 were killed when the plane overran the runway after the pilot attempted to make an instrument-only approach with curtained cockpit windows. Investigators determined the cause of the accident was pilot error.

== Background ==
The crew of the Tu-134A aircraft, serial number 62327 manufactured on 28 June 1979, consisted of pilot in command Alexander Kliuyev, co-pilot Gennady Zhirnov, navigating officer Ivan Mokhonko, flight engineer Kyuri Khamzatov, and three flight attendants. Having departed from Koltsovo Airport in Yekaterinburg (then Sverdlovsk) and bound for Grozny, Flight 6502 had one stopover at Kurumoch Airport in Samara (then Kuibyshev).

== Crash ==
While approaching Kurumoch Airport, Captain Kliuyev made a bet with First Officer Zhirnov that he could make an instrument-only approach with curtained cockpit windows, thus having no visual contact with the ground, instead of an NDB approach, suggested by air traffic control. Kliuyev ignored the ground-proximity warning at an altitude of 62–65 metres (203–213 ft) and did not make the suggested go-around. The aircraft touched down on the runway at a speed of 280 km/h (150 kn; 170 mph) and came to rest upside down after overrunning the runway. Sixty-eight people died during the accident and seven more later in hospital. Among the passengers were 14 children, all of whom survived the accident. The top-secret report of the chairman of Kuibyshev oblispolkom V. A. Pogodin to Premier Nikolai Ryzhkov gave slightly different figures: of 85 passengers and 8 crew members aboard, 53 passengers and 5 crew members died in the crash and 11 more in hospital later.

Though Zhirnov made no attempt to avert the crash, he subsequently tried to save the passengers and died of smoke-induced cardiac arrest while on the way to the hospital. Kliuyev was prosecuted and sentenced to 15 years in prison, later reduced to 6 years served.

== See also ==
- National Airlines Flight 27, where in-flight experimentation possibly caused an uncontained engine failure
- Northwest Airlines Flight 188, where the pilots stopped monitoring the flight
- Pinnacle Airlines Flight 3701, a crash where the pilots chose, for fun, to exceed aircraft limits
- Aeroflot Flight 593, a crash where the pilots allowed children in the cockpit
- United Airlines Flight 2885, a crash where the pilots let the flight engineer fly the plane
