= United Airlines Flight 2885 =

1983 aviation accident

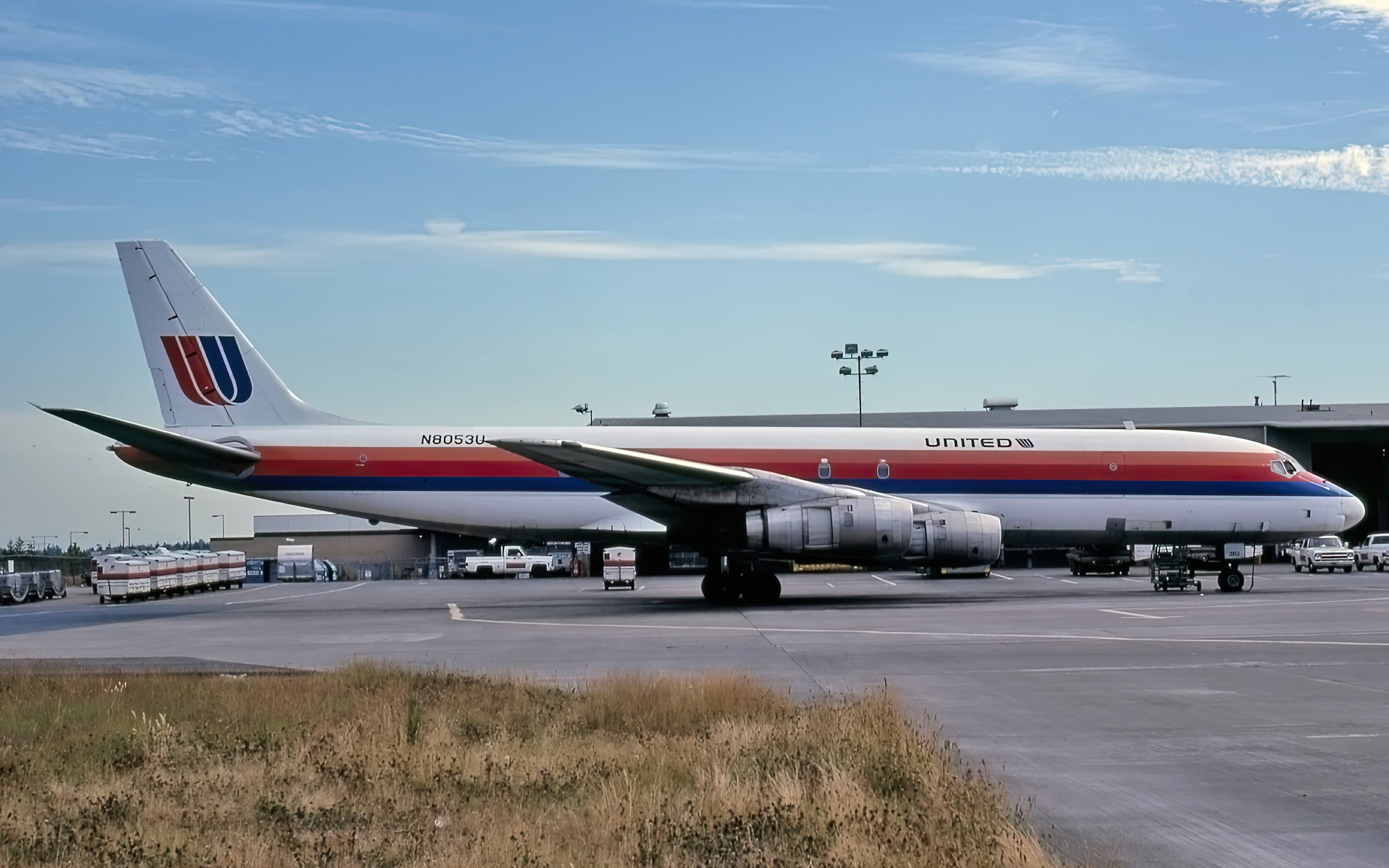
- N8053U, the aircraft involved in the accident

Accident
- Date: January 11, 1983
- Summary: Crashed after takeoff due to pilot error
- Site: Detroit Metropolitan Wayne County Airport Romulus, Michigan, United States; 42°12′42.08″N 83°22′12.11″W

Aircraft
- Aircraft type: McDonnell Douglas DC-8-54F
- Operator: United Airlines
- IATA flight No.: UA2885
- ICAO flight No.: UAL2885
- Call sign: UNITED 2885
- Registration: N8053U
- Flight origin: Cleveland Hopkins International Airport
- Stopover: Detroit Metropolitan Wayne County Airport
- Destination: Los Angeles International Airport
- Occupants: 3
- Crew: 3
- Fatalities: 3
- Survivors: 0

United Airlines Flight 2885 was a scheduled cargo flight from Cleveland to Los Angeles, with a stopover in Detroit. On January 11, 1983, a DC-8 operating as Flight 2885 crashed after take-off from Detroit, killing all three crew members. The National Transportation Safety Board (NTSB) investigation determined that the cause for the crash was pilot error. A radioactive package was found on board, but no radioactive material was spilled.

== Chronology ==
The aircraft involved in the accident, a 14-year-old McDonnell Douglas DC-8-54F, registration N8053U, departed O'Hare International Airport in Chicago at 22:15 CST on January 10, 1983, operating as United Airlines Flight 2894 bound for Cleveland, Ohio. The three crew members were Captain William S. Todd (55); First Officer James G. Day (51); and Flight Engineer Robert E. Lee (50). At Cleveland, the flight became United 2885; the DC-8 departed Cleveland at 01:15 Eastern Standard Time on January 11. It arrived at Detroit at 01:52 EST; after a cargo turnaround and refueling, the aircraft began its takeoff roll at 02:51. After taking off, the witnesses described that the nose of the aircraft pitched up to an unusually high position, causing temporary engine surges (witnesses on the ground reported occasional fire eruptions from the engines); soon after, the DC-8 began a gradual right roll, eventually entering an upset condition. As the wings reached an almost 90-degree bank at an altitude of approximately 1,000 feet (300 m), the aircraft stalled and fell to the ground, exploding on impact. All three crew members were killed.

== Causes ==
The National Transportation Safety Board (NTSB) investigation revealed that, during the cargo turnaround at Detroit, the pilots had a conversation in the cockpit; at one point, the captain asked the first officer if he was trading seats with the flight engineer, to which the flight engineer said "Oh, we're switching now." The captain did not object and allowed him to perform the takeoff, contrary to both United Airlines and Federal Aviation Administration rules.

As the investigators found, the flight engineer had entered a DC-8 first officer upgrade training in June 1979; however, the instructors found his abilities less than adequate and the training was terminated two months later. The flight engineer resumed his first officer training in February 1980, this time for the Boeing 737; while improving, his abilities were still inadequate—as his instructor stated, "his attitude could not be better and he is a very hard worker, however, he has not made normal progress in his first full year as a first officer." After several failed en-route and proficiency checks, the flight engineer agreed not to bid for pilot vacancies and remained a flight engineer for the rest of his career.

The direct reason for an abnormally nose-up position was found to be an excessively high stabilizer trim setting (7.5 units airplane nose-up); likely, in the confusion due to switching seats, the pilots failed to reset the trim setting while performing the takeoff checklist. (It was reported the first officer had made this mistake occasionally before.) Taking off at night, with no visual references, the inexperienced flight engineer did not correct the attitude in time, leading to engine surges, aircraft banking and eventually an upset and an unrecoverable stall. It is not known why the captain did not manage to correct the situation. The captain's decision to allow the flight engineer to perform the takeoff was considered a contributing factor in the accident.

During an investigation, other United pilots anonymously admitted that swapping seats and flight engineers performing takeoffs and/or landings, while a rare occurrence, were not unheard of on ferry or cargo flights.

== See also ==
- National Airlines Flight 27, where in-flight experimentation may have caused an uncontained engine failure
- Northwest Airlines Flight 188, where the pilots overflew their destination by over a hundred miles due to a lack of attention
- Pinnacle Airlines Flight 3701, a crash where the pilots decided to take the aircraft to its maximum altitude and subsequently crashed
- Aeroflot Flight 593, a crash in which the pilots let a minor fly the aircraft
- Aeroflot Flight 6502, a crash in which the pilots bet they could land blind
