= Aviation Safety Action Program =

US aviation safety program

The Aviation Safety Action Program (ASAP) is a US aviation proactive safety program originated in 1994 at American Airlines by Captain K. Scott Griffith. ASAP promotes safety by encouraging voluntary self reporting of safety occurrences and situations to the Federal Aviation Administration (FAA) certificate holder. The reports are analyzed to reduce hazards and focus training. Reporting is encouraged by providing the volunteer reporter protection from certificate action. ASAP forms a safety team between the FAA, the certificate holder (airline/operator), employee, and the operator's employee labor organization. Safety improvement occurs without discipline, encouraging further and continued hazard reporting.As of March 2025 data available, the Federal Aviation Administration (FAA) reports that there are 262 operators participating in ASAP, encompassing a total of 767 individual programs. The most current information and a detailed list of participating organizations is available on FAA's official ASAP Participants page.

== FAA guidance ==
The US Department of Transportation FAA produces the Advisory Circular 120-66C directing how to implement the ASAP program at the certificate holder's company. The Aviation Safety Action Program (ASAP) starts with all parties, FAA/Certificate holder/Union, signing a memorandum of understanding (MOU). The time frame for ASAP report submission is limited. Reports are reviewed by the Event Review Committee (ERC) normally composed of the FAA, operator, and union representative. The ERC normally decides to accept an ASAP report unless it is ineligible. Accepted ASAP reports are reviewed for data and possible further action such as employee contact or additional training.

== ASAP ineligibility ==
ASAP reports are ineligible if: there is intentional noncompliance; safety is intentionally disregarded; actions are criminal; substance abuse; or intentional falsification.

== Sister programs ==
Other proactive safety programs include the Flight Operations Quality Assurance and NASA's Aviation Safety Reporting System.

== See also ==
- EASA
- FAA
- ICAO
- Civil Aviation Authority
- Air safety
- Accident
- Aviation safety improvement initiative
