= Jefferson City Memorial Airport =

Airport in Missouri, US

- IATA: JEF; ICAO: KJEF; FAA LID: JEF

Summary
- Airport type: Public
- Owner: City of Jefferson City
- Location: Jefferson City, Missouri
- Elevation AMSL: 549 ft (167 m)
- Coordinates: 38°35′28″N 092°09′22″W
- Website: http://www.jeffersoncitymo.gov/government/airport.php

Map
- Location of airport in Missouri / United States JEF (the United States)

Runways
Direction	Length		Surface
Direction	ft	m	Surface
12/30	6,000	1,829	Asphalt
9/27	3,401	1,037	Concrete

Statistics (2019)
- Aircraft operations: 34,909
- Based aircraft: 59
- Source: Federal Aviation Administration

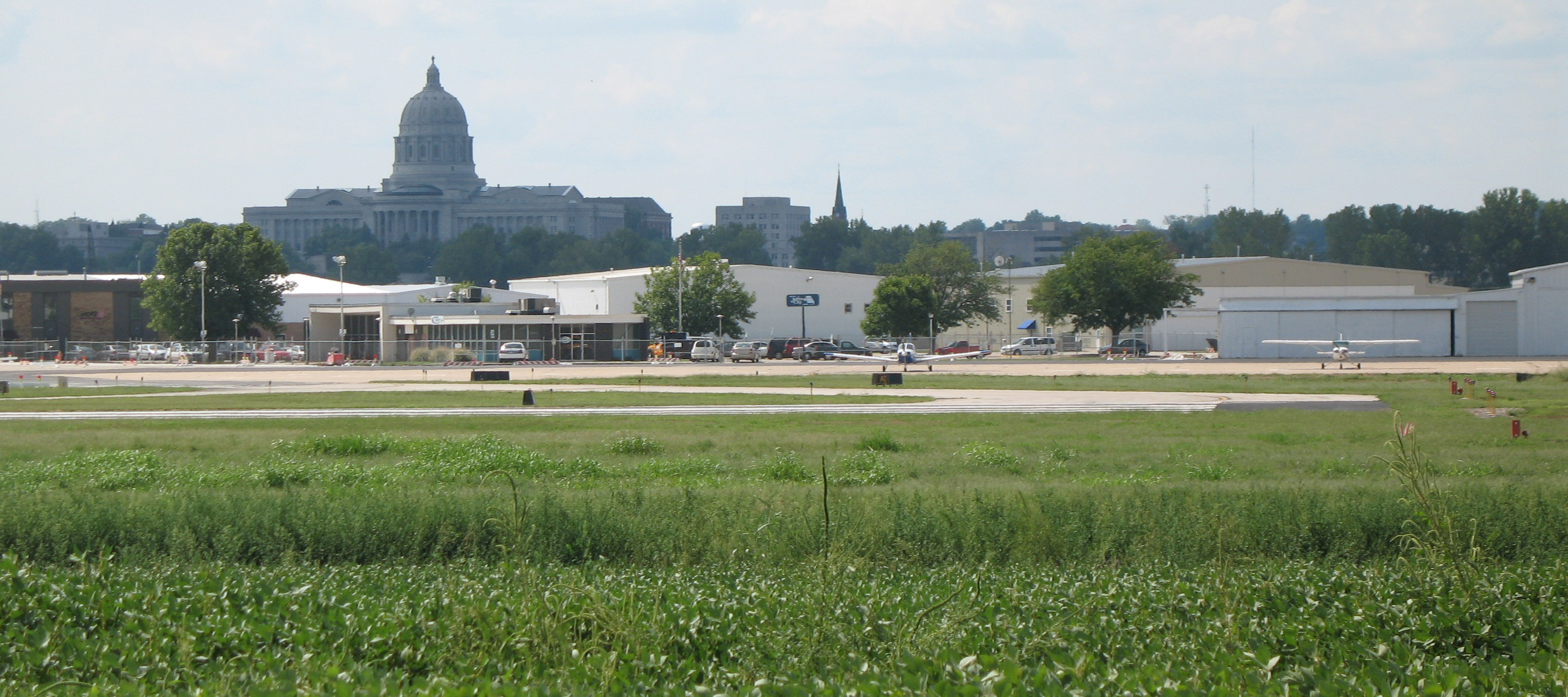
Airport with state capitol in background

Jefferson City Memorial Airport (IATA: JEF, ICAO: KJEF, FAA LID: JEF) is two miles (3 km) northeast of Jefferson City, in Callaway County, Missouri. It is owned by the City of Jefferson City.

Ozark DC-3s and M404s stopped there from 1954 until Columbia Regional Airport opened in 1968.

== Facilities ==
The airport covers 469 acres (190 ha) and has two paved runways: 12/30 is 6,000 x 100 ft (1,829 x 30 m) and 9/27 is 3,401 x 75 ft (1,037 x 23 m).

For the 12-month period ending December 31, 2019, the airport had 34,909 aircraft operations, an average of 96 per day: 86.6% general aviation, 10.8% military and 2.5% air taxi. At that time, there were 59 aircraft based at this airport: 32 single-engine, 15 multi-engine, 9 jet, and 3 helicopters. 7 aircraft were military.

== Accidents ==
On October 14, 2004 Pinnacle Airlines Flight 3701 crashed short of Jefferson City Memorial Airport; both persons on board were killed.

== See also ==
- List of airports in Missouri
