= Core lock =

Abrupt thermal expansion of aircraft engine parts

Core lock is a type of turbine engine failure that can occur during flight. When an engine is shut down in the air, some components cool faster than others due to the engine's design. Because materials expand and contract at different rates as temperatures change, this uneven cooling can cause parts of the engine to seize. If the dimensional changes are severe enough, critical components may become jammed, reducing or completely preventing rotation.

Core lock makes it difficult for pilots to perform either a windmill restart or an APU-assisted engine restart.

Once the engine is allowed to cool uniformly, the components gradually return to their normal dimensions, resolving the core lock condition.

== Pinnacle Airlines Flight 3701 ==
Core lock was cited as one of the contributing causes to the October 2004 Pinnacle Airlines Flight 3701 accident, noting that the primary cause, the pilots' "unprofessional ... deviation from standard operating procedures," causing both engines to shut down, was exacerbated by:

the pilots' failure to achieve and maintain the target airspeed in the double engine failure checklist, which caused the engine cores to stop rotating and resulted in the core lock engine condition. Contributing to this accident was 1) the engine core lock condition, which prevented at least one engine from being restarted, and 2) the airplane flight manuals that did not communicate to pilots the importance of maintaining a minimum airspeed to rotate the engine cores sufficiently during the restart procedure.

== See also ==
- Index of aviation articles
