= Flameout =

Type of engine issue in aviation

In aviation, a flameout (or flame-out) is the run-down of a jet engine or other turbine engine due to the extinguishment of the flame in its combustor. The loss of flame can have a variety of causes, such as fuel starvation, excessive altitude, compressor stall, foreign object damage deriving from birds, hail, or volcanic ash, severe precipitation, mechanical failure, or very low ambient temperatures.

== Engine control ==
Early jet engines were prone to flameout following disturbances of inlet airflow, or sudden or inappropriate thrust lever movements, which resulted in incorrect air-fuel ratios in the combustion chamber. Modern engines are much more robust in this respect, and are often digitally controlled, which allows for significantly more effective control of all engine parameters to prevent flameouts and even initiate an automatic restart if a flameout occurs.

Flameouts occur most frequently at intermediate or low power settings such as in cruise and descent. To prevent a flameout when atmospheric or operational conditions are conducive to it, engine control systems usually provide a continuous ignition function. Igniters are normally used only at engine start, until the flame in the combustion chamber becomes self-sustaining. With continuous ignition, instead, the igniters are continually sparked every second or less, so that if a flameout occurs, combustion can immediately be restored.

== Engine restart ==
Following a flameout, jet engines can normally be restarted in flight, provided the aircraft is flying within the portion of its flight envelope defined as the engine relight envelope. Depending on where in the relight envelope the restart is attempted (that is depending on the aircraft's airspeed and altitude), the procedure may simply rely on the airflow (windmill restart) or require the use of the starter (starter-assisted restart) in order for the compressor to achieve sufficient rotational speed for successful ignition.

For example, the Airbus A320 passenger jet has a maximum ceiling of over 39,000 ft (12,000 m), but its certified engine relight envelope only extends to 30,000 ft (9,100 m). Up to that altitude, a windmill restart can be attempted at airspeeds greater than 260 knots (480 km/h; 300 mph); below that speed, a starter-assisted relight is required.

Core lock can make restart impossible.

== See also ==
- Index of aviation articles
