= Northwest Airlines Flight 188 =

2009 aviation incident in the United States

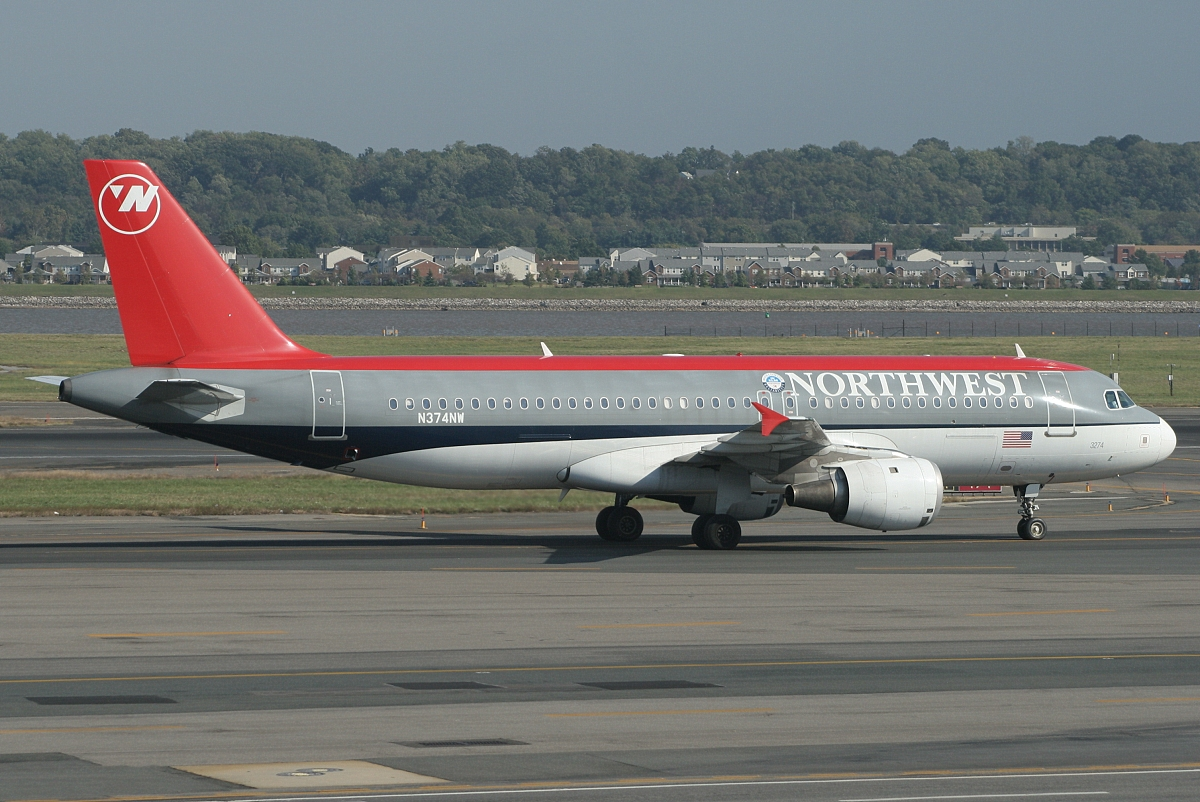
- N374NW, the Airbus A320 used for Flight 188

Incident
- Date: October 21, 2009
- Summary: Pilot error and distraction
- Site: Minnesota, United States

Aircraft
- Aircraft type: Airbus A320-212
- Operator: Northwest Airlines
- Registration: N374NW
- Flight origin: San Diego International Airport
- Destination: Minneapolis-Saint Paul International Airport
- Occupants: 149
- Passengers: 144
- Crew: 5
- Fatalities: 0
- Survivors: 149

Northwest Airlines Flight 188 was a regularly scheduled flight from San Diego, California, to Minneapolis–Saint Paul, Minnesota, on October 21, 2009, which overshot its destination by more than 150 miles (240 km) because of pilot error. During the event, air traffic control lost contact with the flight for approximately 75 minutes. The flight later landed at Minneapolis–Saint Paul International Airport over an hour past its scheduled arrival.

As a result of the incident, the Federal Aviation Administration (FAA) revoked the pilot certificates of the involved pilots and the National Transportation Safety Board (NTSB) issued recommendations for changes to air traffic control procedures and the rules for cockpit crew. The incident also caused American lawmakers to move to prevent pilots on U.S. airliners from using personal electronic devices while taxiing or flying.

== Aircraft ==
The aircraft involved was an Airbus A320-212, registered as N374NW, serial number 1646. It was delivered to Northwest Airlines in December 2001. The aircraft was equipped with two CFM International CFM56-5A3 engines.

== Incident ==
The Airbus A320 took off from San Diego International Airport at 5:01 p.m. CDT (3:01 pm in San Diego). It was scheduled to land at 8:01 p.m. CDT. Just under two hours after takeoff, at 6:56 p.m. CDT, Air Traffic Control lost radio contact with the aircraft while it was over Denver.

During the flight, Denver ARTCC (where contact was lost) instructed the pilots to contact the Minneapolis ARTCC as the aircraft was leaving Denver's airspace. However, the pilots did not do so. Both the Denver and Minneapolis ARTCC made several unsuccessful attempts to reach the pilots. At the request of the Minneapolis ARTCC, Northwest's dispatchers made at least eight attempts to reach the pilots and urge them to reestablish radio contact, without success. When other pilots in the area got word of the situation, they tried to help the controllers, attempting to reach the pilots as well. Northwest also sent them a text message through ACARS, which went unanswered. Authorities were concerned enough that NORAD readied fighter jets to check on the welfare of the plane. Officials at the White House Situation Room were alerted as well.

Just as the fighter jets were about to scramble, air traffic control at Minneapolis-St. Paul International Airport reestablished radio contact with the plane at 8:14 p.m. CDT, by which time the flight was over Eau Claire, Wisconsin, roughly 100 miles (160 km) east of Minneapolis. Captain Timothy Cheney and first officer Richard Cole said that they were not aware of their location until a flight attendant asked them what time they were due to land. The overshoot concerned air traffic controllers enough that they had the pilots perform a series of maneuvers to confirm the pilots were in control of the plane, as well as to verify that the transponder target they were receiving on their radar was indeed Flight 188. The aircraft finally landed, over an hour late, at 9:04 p.m. CDT.

== Investigation ==
During the investigation, Cheney and Cole told the National Transportation Safety Board investigators that they were going over schedules using their laptop computers—a serious breach of piloting fundamentals, as well as a violation of Delta Air Lines policy (Delta had recently merged with Northwest). The pilots denied suggestions from some aviation safety experts that they had fallen asleep. The cockpit voice recorder retains only the last 30 minutes of audio after being powered off and thus audio recordings were not available for the complete duration of the flight's loss of radio contact.

== Findings ==
On October 27, 2009, the FAA revoked the certificates of both pilots. The incident and subsequent investigation have led to changes in the rules for cockpit crew and air traffic controllers. One issue of particular concern was the delay, exceeding an hour, from the time air traffic controllers realized the plane was out radio contact until an alert on the Domestic Events Network (DEN) was created and NORAD was informed of the situation. The commander of NORAD, General Gene Renuart Jr., said in an interview that ideally an alert is created within 10 minutes of losing contact and if they had been alerted in time, fighter jets would have been scrambled to intercept. An updated FAA notice effective November 10, 2010, called for an alert to be made within five minutes of last recorded radio contact.
