= Flight operations quality assurance =

Aviation safety program

Flight operational quality assurance (FOQA, /ˈfoʊ.kwə/) also known as flight data monitoring (FDM) or flight data analysis, is a method of capturing, analyzing and/or visualizing the data generated by an aircraft moving from one point to another. Applying the information learned from this analysis helps to find new ways to improve flight safety and increase overall operational efficiency. Several airlines and various national air forces have initiated FOQA programs to collect, store and analyze recorded flight data. The goal is to improve overall aviation safety, increase maintenance effectiveness and reduce operational costs.

== Acronyms ==
- FOQA = flight operational quality assurance,
- FDM = flight data monitoring,
- FDA = flight data analysis,
- MOQA = maintenance operational quality assurance,
- MFOQA = military flight operational quality assurance,
- SOQA = simulator operational quality assurance,
- CFOQA = corporate flight operational quality assurance,
- HFDM = helicopter flight data monitoring,
- HOMP = helicopter operational monitoring program.

== Applications ==
As a result of an ICAO Annex 6 mandate, all airlines are required under regional legislation to implement Flight Data Monitoring (FDM) programs. However, in the United States, the Federal Aviation Administration (FAA) does not yet require FOQA programs for commercial operators. The data recorded can be either pilot generated (as he or she moves the controls) or mechanically induced by related systems in the aircraft itself. "A significant barrier to wider adoption in the United States is pilot's universal lack of trust in who will see and act on the flight data once it is recorded and studied."

The European Aviation Safety Agency (EASA) requirement is defined in EU-OPS section 1.037.

The FAA defined FOQA in its Advisory Circular #120-82, dated April 12, 2004. The agency's Air Transportation Operations Inspector's Handbook (FAA Order 8400.10, August 9, 2006) details what a valid FOQA system contains. An excerpt from Volume 1, Chapter 5, Section 2, page 1-221 of this FAA document states: "Flight Operational Quality Assurance (FOQA) is a voluntary safety program designed to improve aviation safety through the proactive use of flight-recorded data."

In India, Directorate General Civil Aviation (DGCA) has made it mandatory for all airline operators to carry out Flight Data Analysis for flight safety. Instruction clearly states the need for a flight safety department for all scheduled operators. Non-scheduled operators are required to present a safety report on a half-yearly basis to DGCA.

== Literature ==
- US DOT: Advisory Circular: Flight Operational Quality Assurance (FOQA), AC No: 120-82, 12. April 2004.
- European Union: Regulations: EU-OPS 1, COMMISSION REGULATION (EC) No 8/2008 of 11 December 2007.
- CAA Safety Regulation Group, CAP 739 Flight Data Monitoring. A Guide to Good Practise. First issue 29. August 2003.
- swiss49 ag, FDM booklet for Pilots, V1.0, 13. January 2009
- IATA, IOSA Standards Manual, January 2008.
