= List of ATR 42 operators =

Operators using specific airliner

The ATR 42 is a regional airliner produced by Franco-Italian manufacturer ATR, with final assembly in Toulouse, France.

On 4 November 1981, the aircraft was launched with ATR, as a joint venture between French Aérospatiale (now Airbus) and Aeritalia (now Leonardo S.p.A.). The number "42" in its name is derived from the aircraft's original standard seating capacity of 42 passengers.

== Civilian operators ==
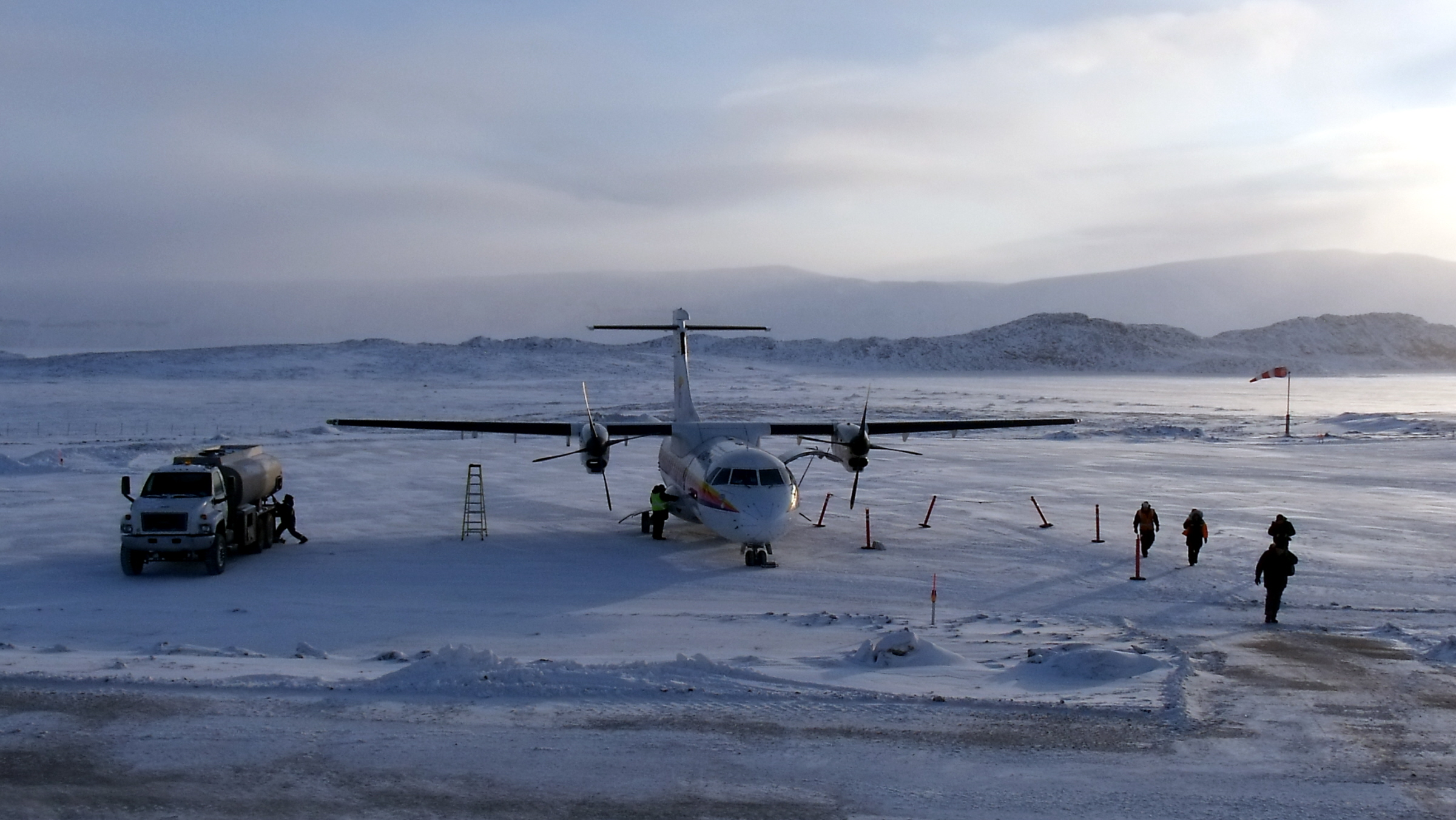
First Air ATR 42–300 in Ikpiarjuk (Arctic Bay), Nunavut Canada in 2012

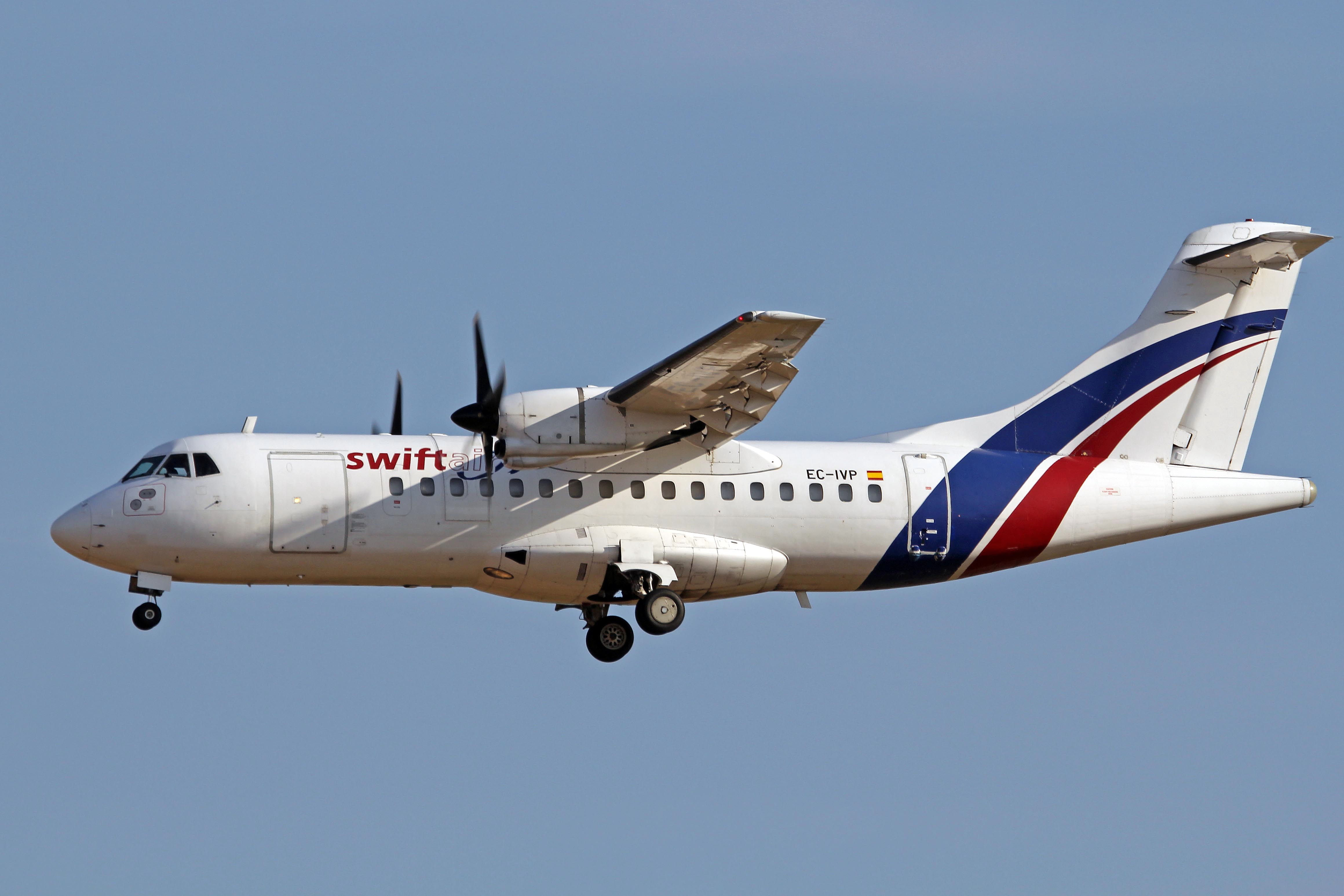
Swiftair ATR 42-300F at Palma de Mallorca Airport in 2012

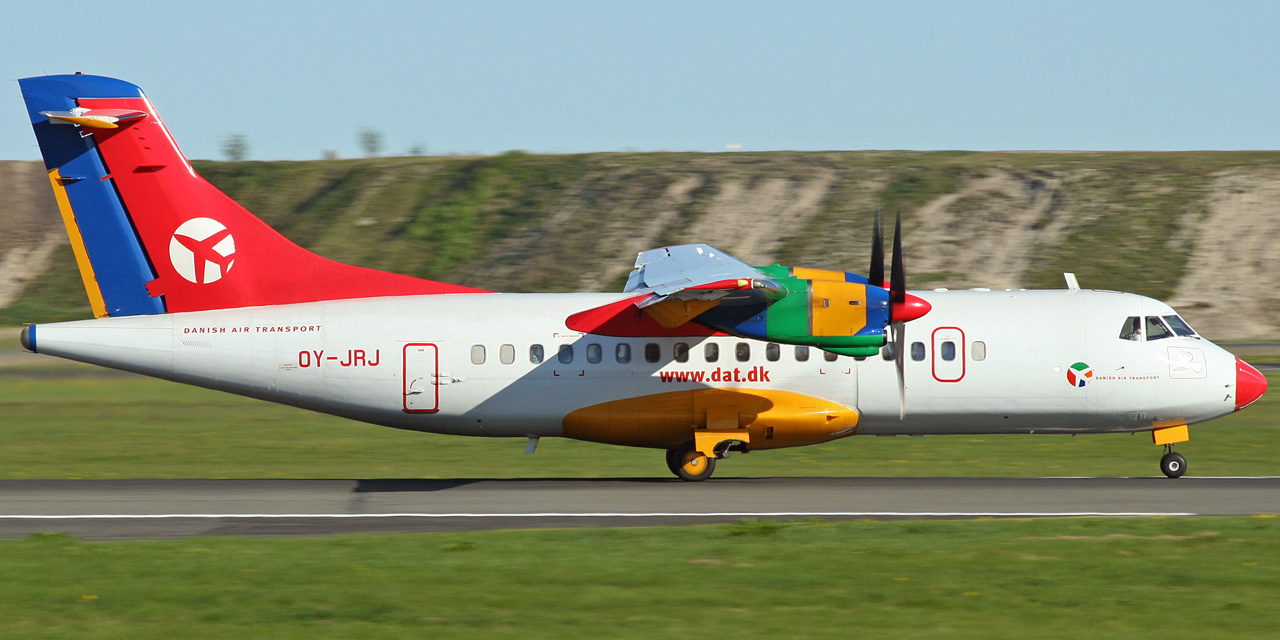
Danish Air Transport ATR 42-320 at Copenhagen Airport in 2007

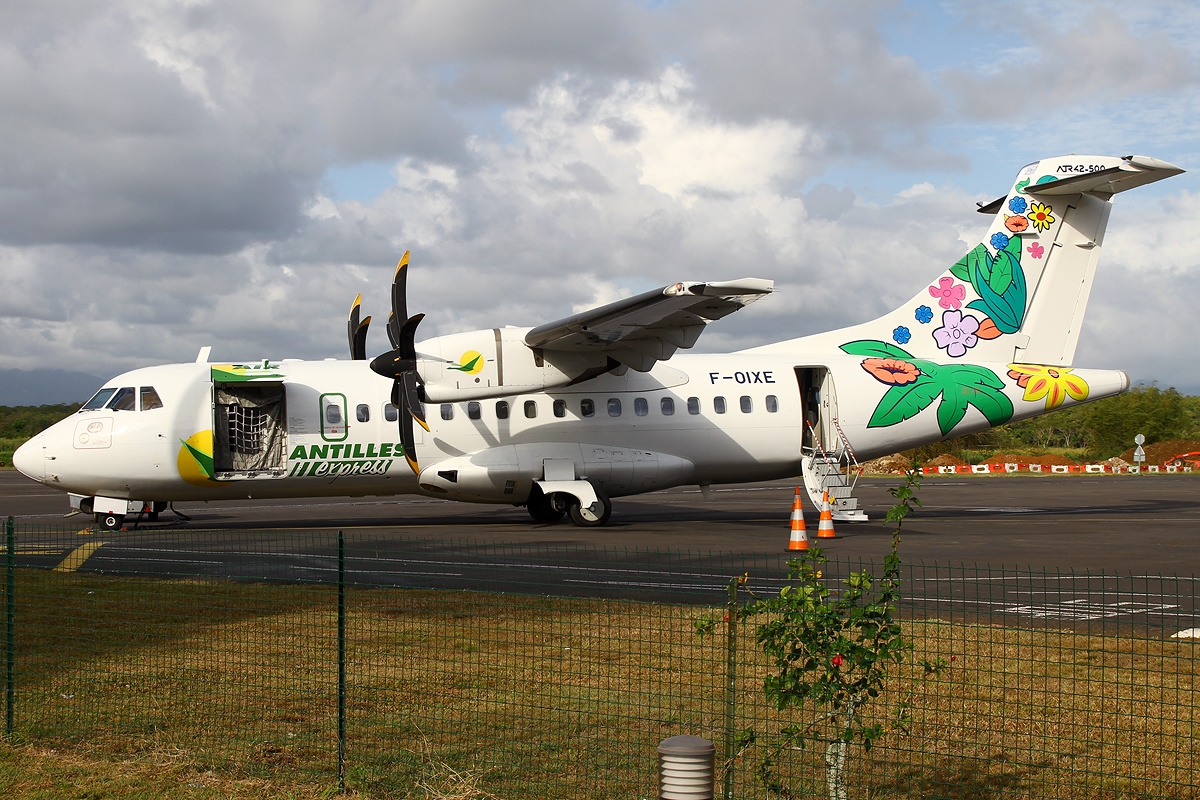
Air Antilles Express ATR 42-500 at Pointe-à-Pitre International Airport in 2012

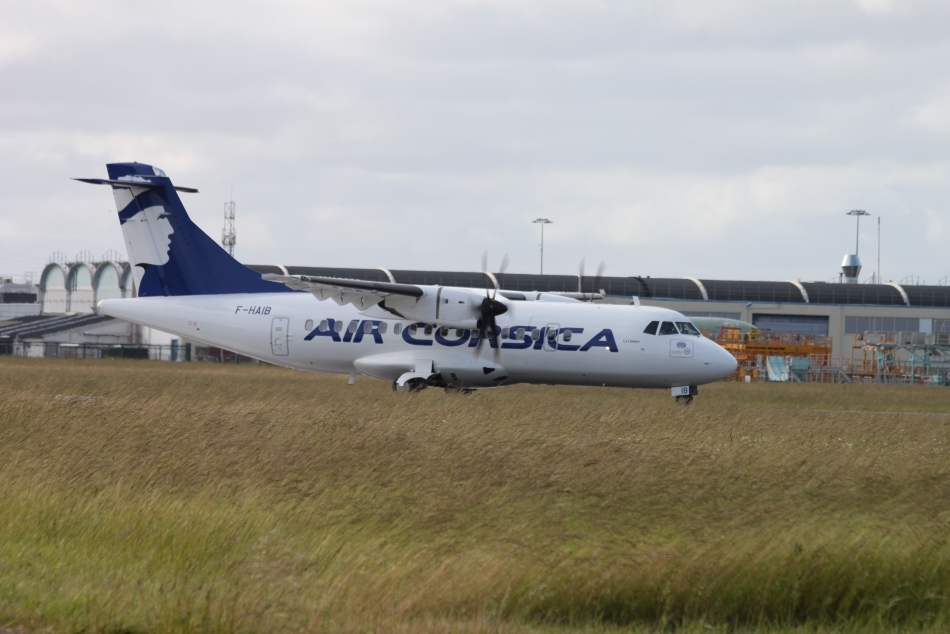
Air Corsica ATR 42-500 at Saint-Nazaire Montoir Airport in 2019

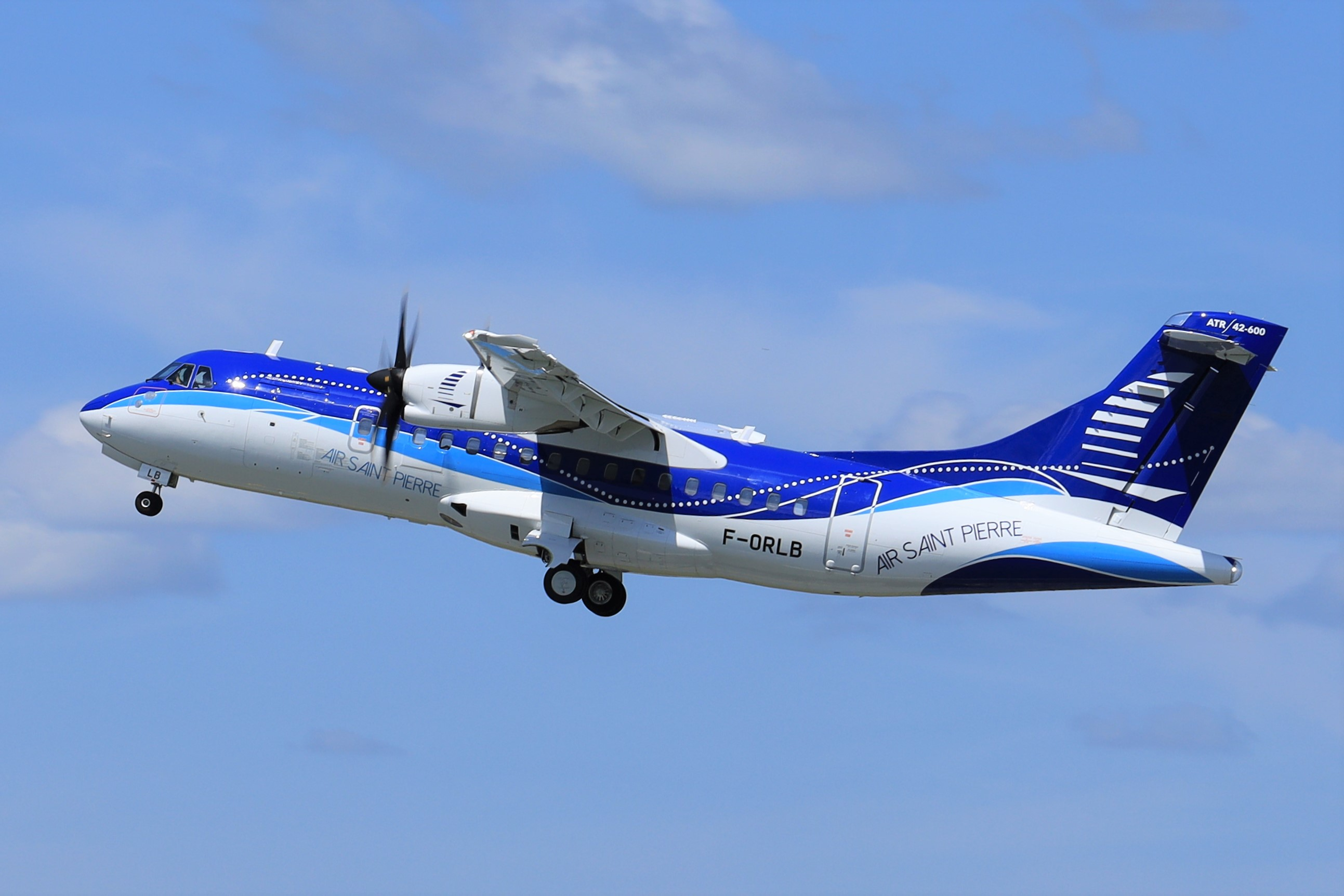
Air Saint Pierre ATR 42-600 in 2021

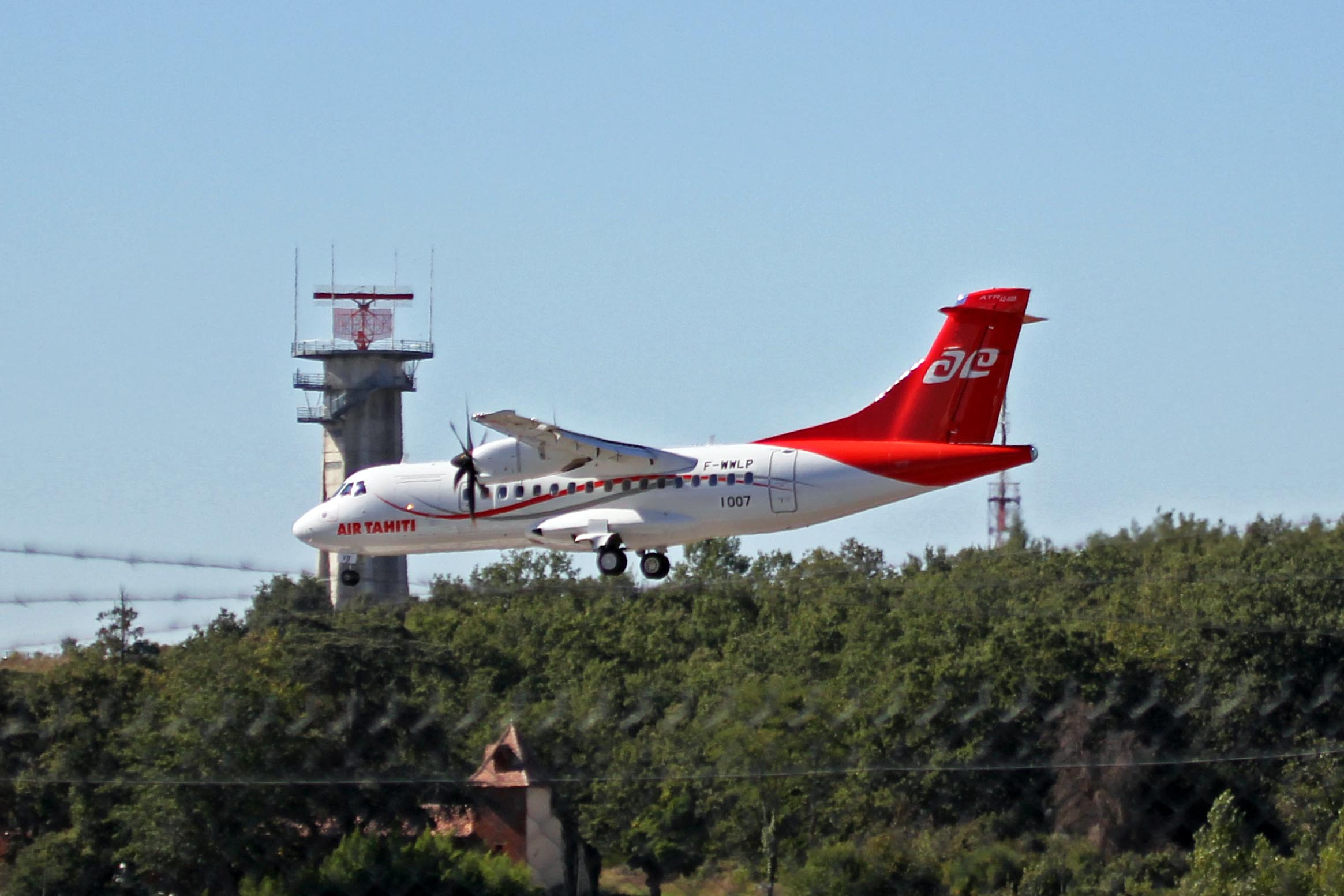
Air Tahiti ATR 42-600 at Toulouse-Blagnac Airport in 2013

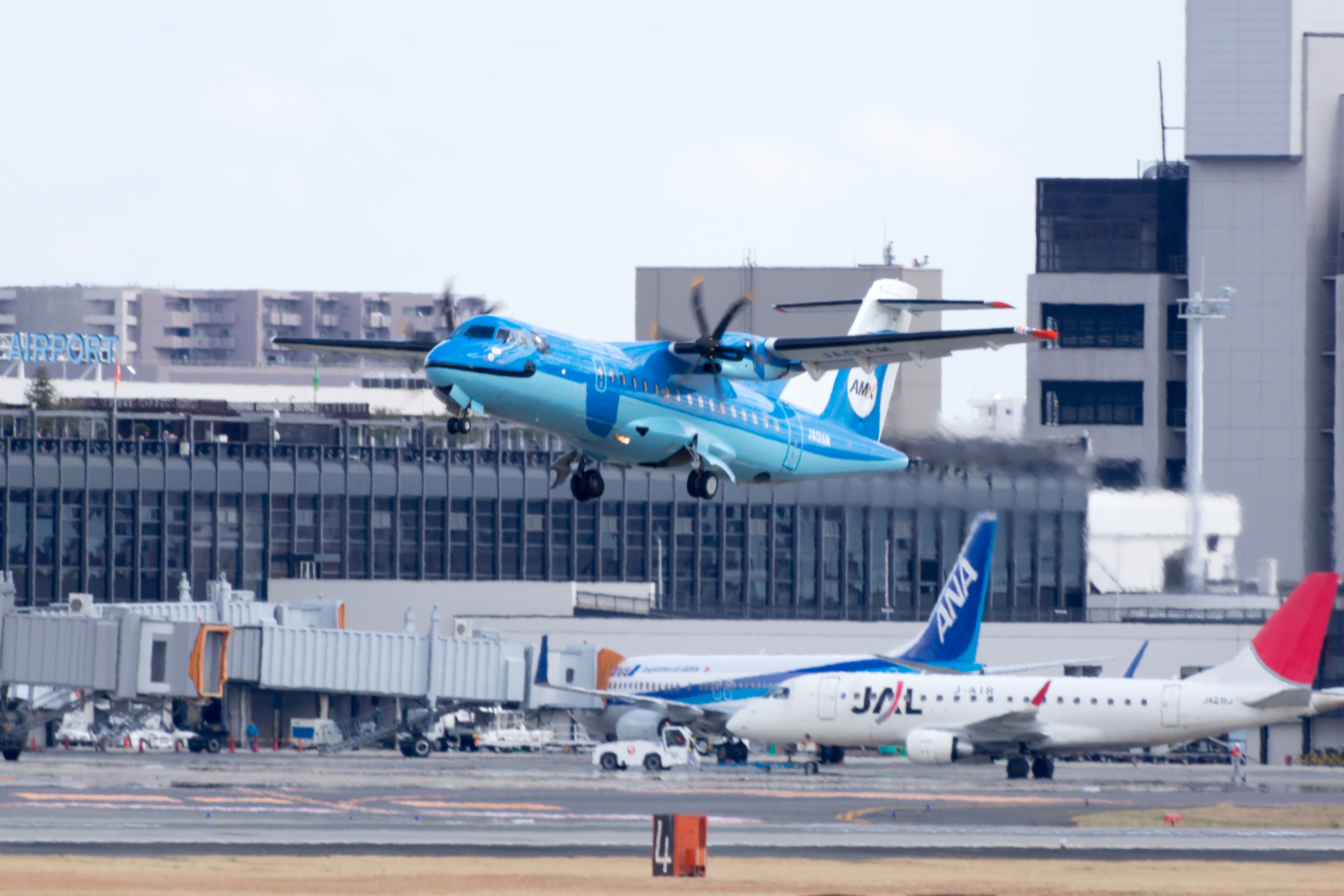
Amakusa Airlines ATR 42-600 at Itami Airport in 2016

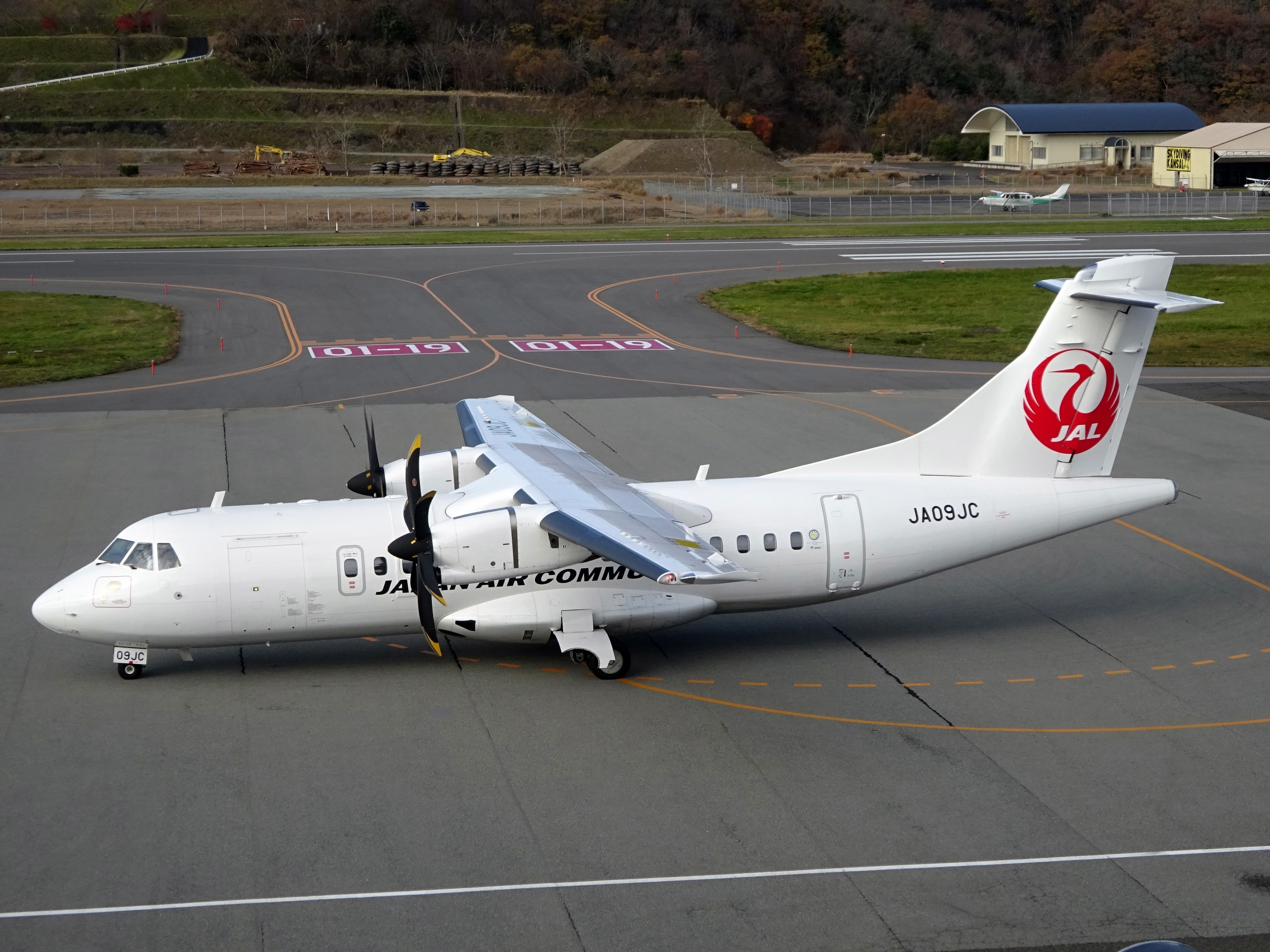
Japan Air Commuter ATR 42-600

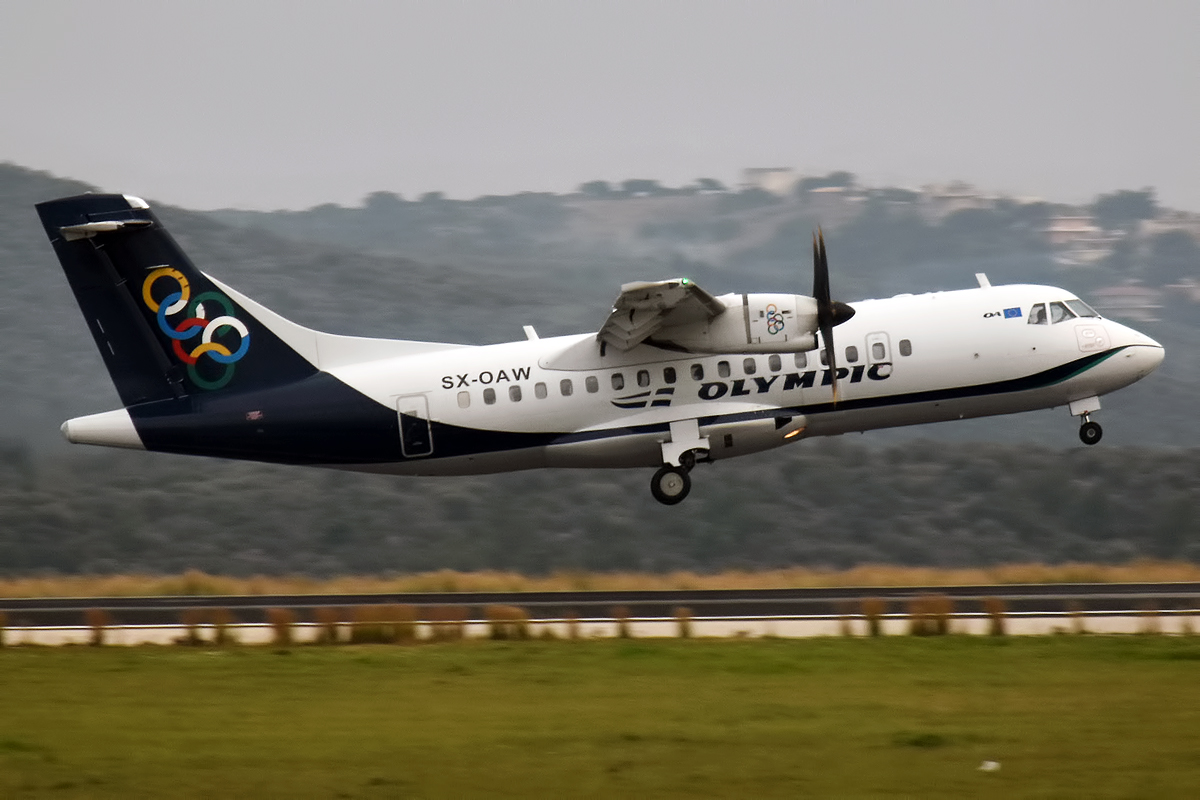
Olympic Air ATR 42-600 at Athens Airport in 2020

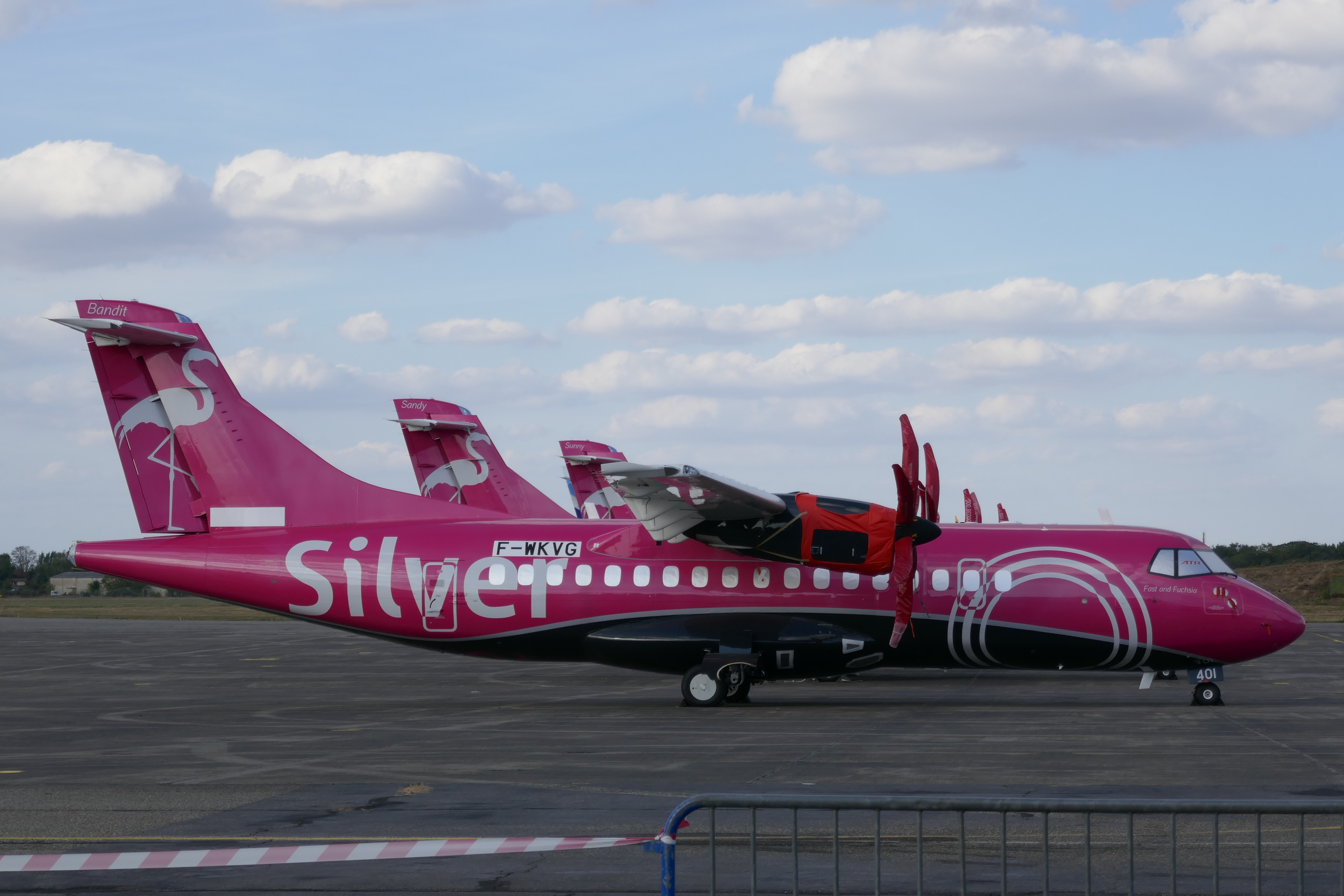
Silver Airways ATR 42-600

Airline	300	320	420	500	600	600S	Total
Aerogaviota	–	–	–	2	–	–	2
AfriJet	–	–	–	1	–	–	1
Air Corsica	–	–	–	1	–	–	1
Air North	3	1	–	–	–	–	4
Air Saint-Pierre	–	–	–	–	1	–	1
Air Tahiti	–	–	–	–	2	–	2
AirSWIFT	–	–	–	–	2	–	2
Aleutian Airways	–	–	–	–	1	–	1
Alpha Star	–	–	–	–	1	–	1
Amakusa Airlines	–	–	–	–	1	–	1
Amelia International	–	–	–	1	–	–	1
American Jet	–	1	–	–	–	–	1
Bahamasair	–	–	–	–	3	–	3
Berjaya Air	–	–	–	1	–	–	1
Blue Ridge Aero Services	1	1	–	–	–	–	2
Buddha Air	–	1	–	–	–	–	1
Calm Air	4	1	–	–	–	–	5
Canadian North	5	2	–	6	–	–	13
CEIBA Intercontinental	–	1	–	–	–	–	1
Chalair Aviation	–	–	–	3	–	–	3
Cubana de Aviación	–	–	–	1	–	–	1
Danish Air Transport	4	–	-	5	-	–	9
DAT LT	–	–	–	1	–	–	1
DHL de Guatemala	1	–	–	–	–	–	1
DHL Ecuador	1	–	–	–	–	–	1
Druk Air	–	–	–	–	1	–	1
EasyFly	–	–	–	2	12	–	14
Empire Airlines	8	3	–	–	–	–	11
FedEx Express	11	6	–	–	–	–	17
Fiji Link	–	–	–	–	1	–	1
Fleet Air International	–	2	–	–	–	–	2
Maldivian	–	–	–	–	3	–	3
Gatari Air Service	–	–	–	2	–	–	2
Hello Airlines	1	–	–	–	–	–	1
Hevilift	–	1	–	4	–	–	5
Hevilift Australia	–	–	–	1	–	–	1
Hokkaido Air System	–	–	–	–	3	–	3
Indonesia Air Transport	–	–	–	1	–	–	1
InterCaribbean Airways	–	–	–	1	–	–	1
Japan Air Commuter	–	–	–	–	9	–	9
JSX (airline)	-	--	-	-	2	-	2
KrasAvia	–	–	–	5	–	–	5
La Costena	–	1	–	–	–	–	1
LIAT	–	–	–	–	3	–	3
Libyan Airlines	–	–	–	2	–	–	2
Loganair	–	–	–	5	2	–	7
Mountain Air Cargo	6	2	–	–	–	–	8
NyxAir	–	–	–	2	–	–	2
Olympic Air	–	–	–	–	3	–	3
OMNI Taxi Aéreo	–	–	–	1	–	–	1
Oriental Air Bridge	–	–	–	–	1	–	1
Overland Airways	1		–	–	–	–	1
Pakistan International Airlines	–	–	–	3	–	–	3
Pelita Air	–	–	–	1	–	–	1
Precision Air	–	1	–	1	2	–	4
Rise Air	2	–	–	2	–	–	4
SATENA	–	–	–	4	3	–	7
Silk Avia	–	–	–	–	2	–	2
Silk Way West Airlines	–	–	–	1	–	–	1
Sky Express (Greece)	–	–	–	4	–	–	4
Swiftair	5	–	–	–	–	–	5
Tiko Air	1	–	–	–	–	–	1
Total Linhas Aéreas	–	–	–	1	–	–	1
Travira Air	–	–	–	–	1	–	1
Trigana Air	2	2	–	1	–	–	5
Tropical Air	2	–	–	–	–	–	2
Vensecar Internacional	1	–	–	–	–	–	1
Voepass Linhas Aéreas	–	–	–	2	–	–	2
Wasaya Airways	–	1	–	–	–	–	1
Zimex Aviation	1	1	–	1	–	–	3
Zimex Aviation Austria	–	2	–	–	–	–	2
Total	61	35	0	74	62	0	232

On 1 August 2017 Silver Airways placed orders for 20 ATR 42–600 aircraft, marking the entry of the −600 into the U.S. market, with four in service as of the fourth quarter 2019.

By November 2018, Loganair was to replace its Saab 340s and Saab 2000s, costly to operate and maintain, mostly the 2000, with around 20 ATR 42s over four to five years from the third quarter of 2019.

== Military operators ==
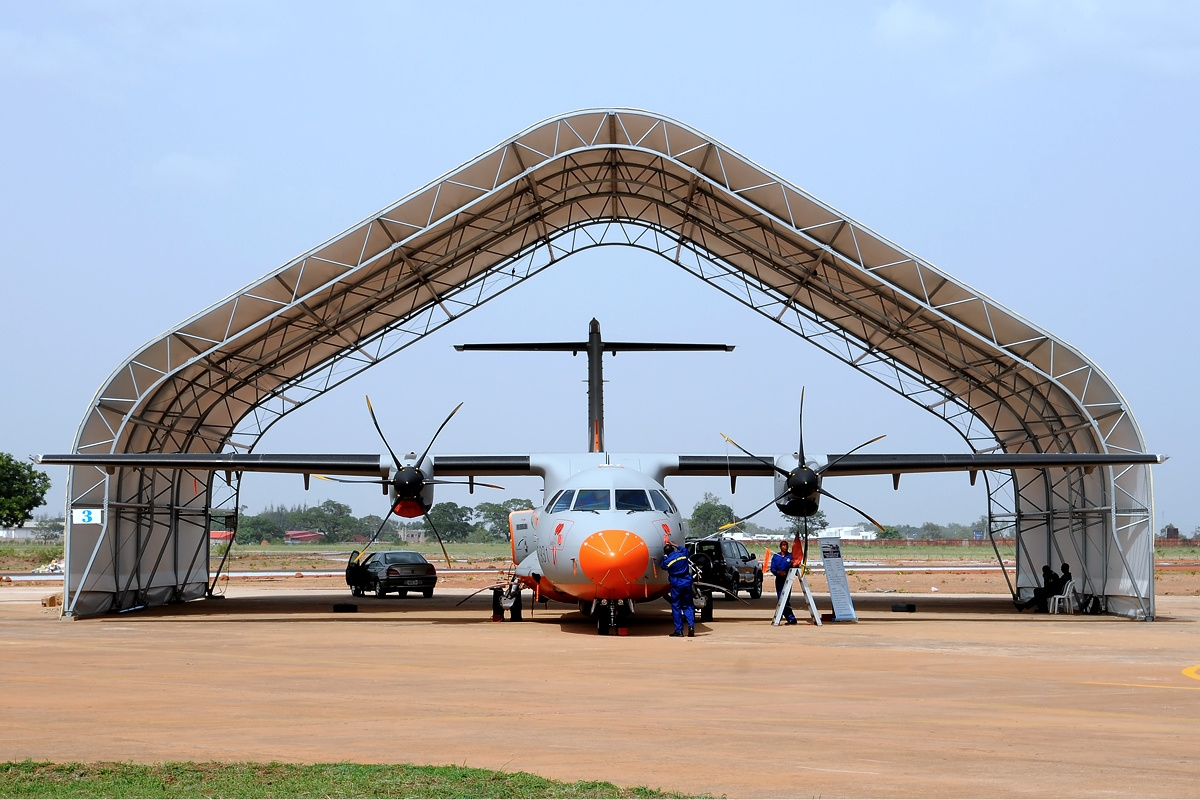
Nigerian Air Force ATR-42 Surveyor

As of August 2022, 6 ATR 42s were in military service.

- Colombian Navy: 1
- Nigerian Air Force: 2 MPAs
- Myanmar Air Force: 3 special mission aircraft
- Senegalese Air Force: 1

== Government operators ==
- French Service des avions français instrumentés pour la recherche en environnement: An ATR42-320 used for environmental research purposes (F-HMTO)
- Indonesian Directorate General of Marine and Fisheries Resources Surveillance: An ATR 42-320, operated by Trigana Air (PK-YRE).
- Italian Corps of the Port Captaincies – Coast Guard: 3 MPs
- Italian Guardia di Finanza: 5 MPs
- Senegal Asecna

== Former operators ==
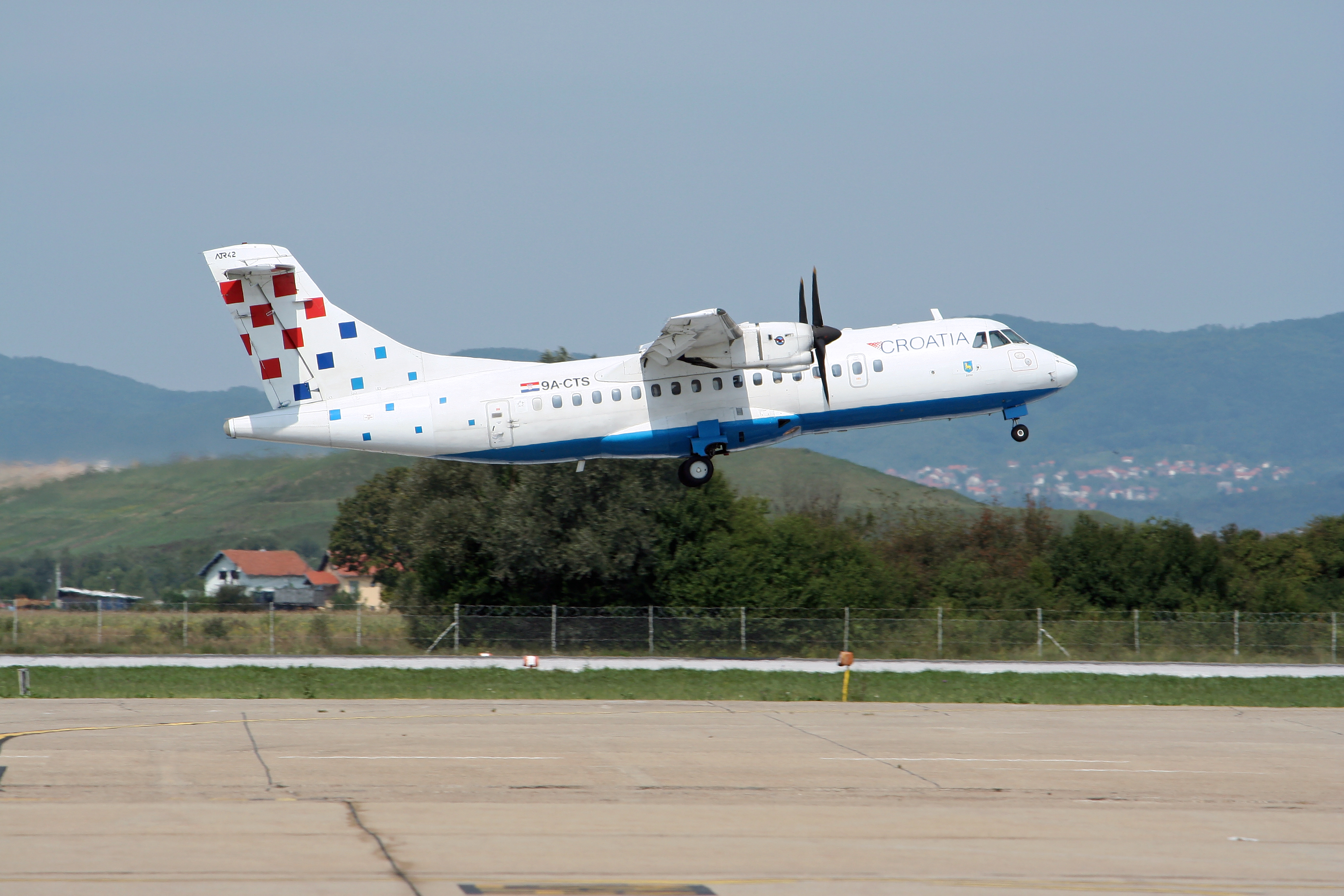
Croatia Airlines ATR 42-300QC

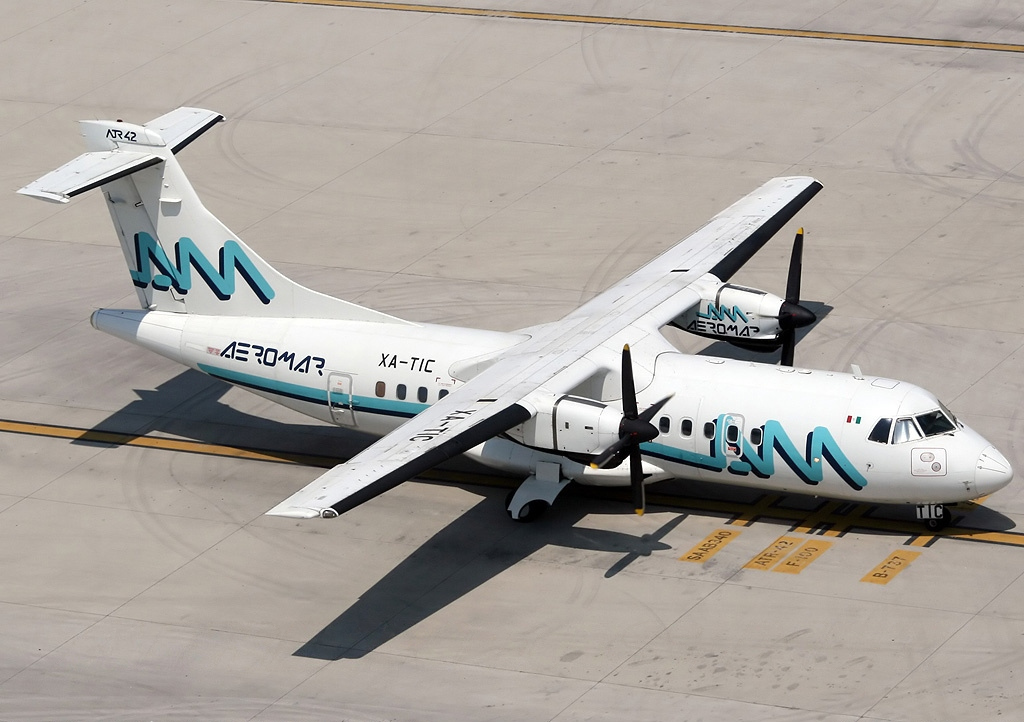
Aeromar ATR 42-320 at Querétaro Intercontinental Airport in 2009

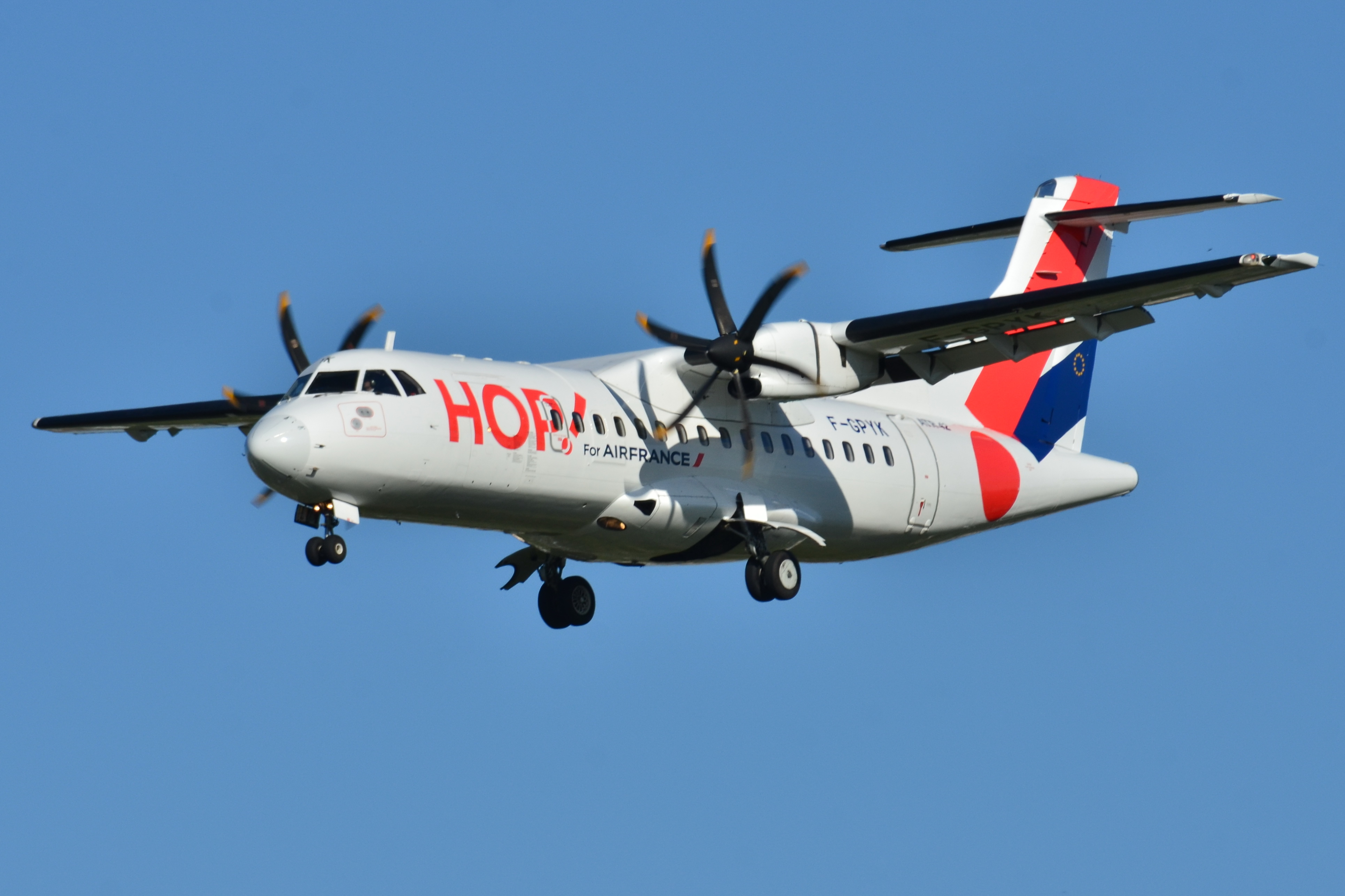
Air France Hop ATR 42-500 at Toulouse-Blagnac Airport in 2013

- Aer Lingus Regional
- Aero Trasporti Italiani
- Aeromar
- Air France Hop - 13 ATR 42-500s.
- Air Lithuania - 3 ATR 42-300s.
- Air Littoral
- Air Mandalay - 2 ATR 42-300 and 2 ATR 42-320
- American Eagle Airlines
- Aces Colombia
- Bangkok Airways
- BonaireExel
- Canadian Regional Airlines
- Colombian Air Force
- Colombian National Police
- Croatia Airlines
- Dutch Antilles Express
- Finncomm Airlines
- Gabonese Air Force
- Inter-Canadien
- Iran Aseman Airlines - 1 ATR 42-300.
- Israir
- Libyan Air Force (1951–2011): 1 MP
- Línea Turística Aereotuy
- Nordic Regional Airlines
- NordStar
- Nusantara Air Charter
- Polish Air Force leased one ATR 42-300 for six months in 2002.
- Royal Air Maroc - 4 ATR 42-300.
- Ryanair - 3 ATR 42-300 and 1 ATR 42-320
- SBA Airlines - 2 ATR 42-300 and 12 ATR 42-320.
- Si Fly - 3 ATR 42-300.
- Silver Airways
- Thai Airways
- TransAsia Airways
- West Wind Aviation
- Ohana by Hawaiian
