= AlphaStar =

AlphaStar may refer to:

- AlphaStar (satellite broadcasting service), defunct direct-to-home satellite broadcasting service in the US
- AlphaStar (software), StarCraft bot developed by DeepMind

== See also ==
- Alpha Star Aviation, charter airline based in Riyadh, Saudi Arabia
