= List of airlines of Saudi Arabia =

This is a list of airlines currently operating in Saudi Arabia.

== Scheduled airlines ==
Airline	Image	IATA	ICAO	Callsign	Commenced operations
Flyadeal		F3	FAD	ADEAL	2017
Flynas		XY	KNE	NAS EXPRESS	2007
Riyadh Air		RX	RXI	RIYADH AIR	2025
Saudia		SV	SVA	SAUDIA	1945

== Charter airlines ==
Airline	Image	IATA	ICAO	Callsign	Commenced operations
Al-Anwa Aviation		–	–	–	2013
Aloula Aviation		–	–	–	1934
Dallah Avco		–	–	–	1975
Mid East Jet		–	XAH	–	1990
Sky Prime Aviation		UY	SPD	SKYPRIME	2016

== Cargo airlines ==
Airline	Image	IATA	ICAO	Callsign	Commenced operations
Saudia Cargo		SV	SVA	SAUDIA	2007
Riyadh Cargo	–	–	–	—	TBA

== See also ==
- Lists of airlines
- List of defunct airlines of Saudi Arabia
- List of defunct airlines of Asia
- List of airports in Saudi Arabia
