= Dallah Avco =

Aviation-services company

Dallah Avco is an aviation-services company founded in 1975 with extensive contracts with the Saudi Ministry of Defense and Aviation.

== Profile ==
As of 2013, Dallah Avco was one of seven Saudi-based airline companies. A sister concern of Dallah Avco also conducts construction and maintenance contracts in the two holy cities of Mecca and Medina. Both are subsidiaries of Dallah Al-Baraka Group owned by Sheikh Saleh Abdullah Kamel.

== Fleet ==
The Dallah Avco fleet consists of the following aircraft (as of August 2017):

Dallah Avco fleet
Aircraft	In Service	Orders	Passengers	Notes
Boeing 737-700 BBJ	1	—		
Boeing 737-900 BBJ	1	—		
Total	2			

== Possible connection to 9/11 Attacks ==
Dallah Avco is described in redacted documents released by the FBI in September 2021 as having had approximately fifty "ghost employees", all of whom were paid by the company and yet did not show up to work. Among these employees was Omar al-Bayoumi, a known associate of 9/11 hijackers Nawaf al-Hazmi and Khalid al-Mihdhar. Bayoumi was reportedly paid a stipend of US$3,000 per month by Dallah Avco, although the company has claimed he was actually an employee of the Saudi government. Dallah Avco is one of 10 defendants in a $4.2 billion lawsuit over the attacks which the Supreme Court allowed to proceed in 2014, and whose quest for answers the United States Congress supported in 2016 by passing the Justice Against Sponsors of Terrorism Act. As of April 2023, the case was still being actively litigated.

== See also ==
- List of airlines of Saudi Arabia
