= Sky Prime Aviation =

Saudi charter airline

IATA	ICAO	Call sign
UY	SPD	SKYPRIME
- Founded: 2016; 9 years ago
- Operating bases: King Khalid International Airport
- Fleet size: 14
- Destinations: Charter
- Headquarters: Riyadh, Saudi Arabia
- Website: Sky Prime Aviation

Sky Prime Aviation Services (سكاي برايم لخدمات الطيران, Skay Braym Likhadamat Altayaran) is a private charter airline based in Riyadh, Saudi Arabia operating domestic and international scheduled and charter services, along with parent company Alpha Star Aviation. Its main base is King Khalid International Airport.

== Fleet ==
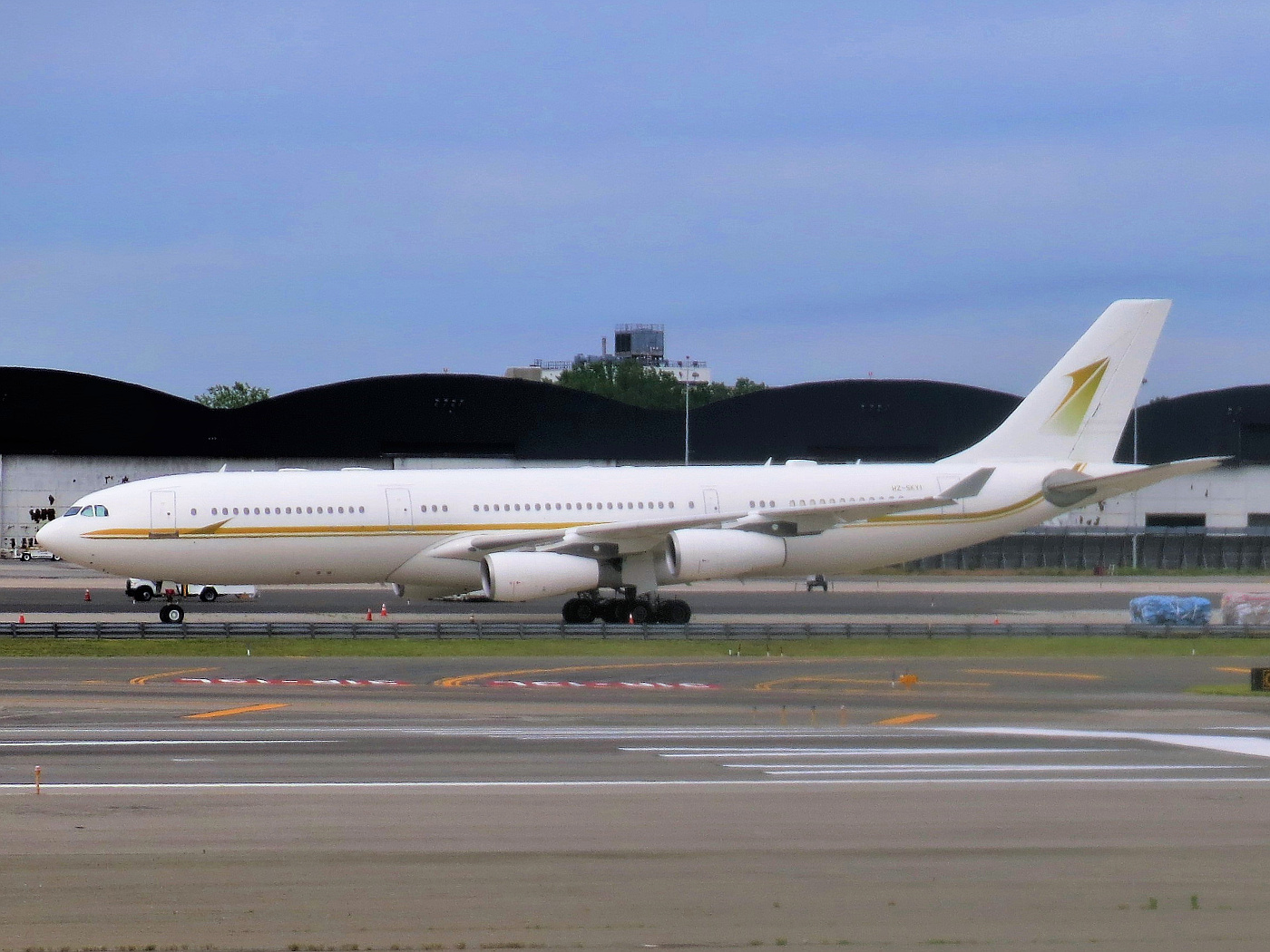
Sky Prime Airbus A340-200 parked at a remote stand at New York-JFK Airport in June 2017.

The Sky Prime fleet consists of the following aircraft (as of April 2018):

Sky Prime fleet
Aircraft	In fleet	Passengers
Airbus A319	1	42
Airbus A320	1	39
Airbus A330-200 Prestige	1	47
Airbus A340-200	1	77
Airbus A340-600	1	N/A
Gulfstream G450	5	8-12
Gulfstream G550	2	14 or 15
Embraer Legacy 500	1	7
Embraer Phenom 300	1	6
Total	14	

== See also ==
- List of airlines of Saudi Arabia
