= Al Anwa Aviation =

Saudi airline

Al Anwa
IATA	ICAO	Call sign
-	-	-
- Founded: 2013
- Ceased operations: 2018
- Hubs: King Khalid International Airport
- Fleet size: 1
- Headquarters: Riyadh, Saudi Arabia
- Website: www.al-anwa.com

Al Anwa Aviation was a charter airline based out of Riyadh, Saudi Arabia. As of 2013 it was one of seven Saudi-based airline companies.

== Fleet ==
The Al Anwa fleet consisted of the following aircraft (as of August 2016):

Al Anwa Fleet
Aircraft	In Fleet	Passengers	Notes
Boeing 727-200RE	1	189	Winglet equipped

=== Retired ===
Al Anwa has also operated the following:

Aircraft	in Fleet	Notes
Lockheed L-1011 TriStar 500	1	-

== See also ==
- List of airlines of Saudi Arabia
