= Air Lithuania =

Regional airline in Lithuania (1991–2005)

IATA	ICAO	Call sign
TT	KLA	KAUNAS
- Founded: 13 September 1991
- Ceased operations: 23 November 2005
- Hubs: Kaunas International Airport
- Secondary hubs: Palanga International Airport
- Fleet size: 3 (2005 est.)
- Destinations: 10 (2005 est.)
- Headquarters: Kaunas, Lithuania
- Website: airlithuania.lt

Air Lithuania (Lithuanian: Aviakompanija Lietuva, literally: Air Company "Lithuania") was a regional airline based in Kaunas in Lithuania. It operated scheduled and charter flights, provided cargo services and aircraft rental. Its main bases were Kaunas International Airport (KUN) and Palanga International Airport (PLQ).

== History ==
Air Lithuania was established as a state-owned company on 13 September 1991 after the reorganization of Aeroflot division in Kaunas. It started charter flights on 15 February 1992. The first scheduled flight was in February 1993 from Kaunas to Budapest. On 17 July 1995, it was reorganized from a state-owned company into a Joint Stock Company. In August 1997, the shares of Air Lithuania were transferred to the parent company Lithuanian Airlines.

In May 2004, Air Lithuania was bought by Arijus, a Lithuanian transport and logistics company, and subsequently sold to World Aviation Capital, a British company. At the time of the sale, the company had debts of approximately 20 million litas, while its annual gross income reached 40 million in 2004. The airline filed for bankruptcy in November 2005. It was the first airline bankruptcy in Lithuania.

In 2004 the airline carried 54,500 passengers (24% increase over 2003). At first, the airline used Tupolev Tu-134 and Yakovlev Yak-40 planes, later leased ATR 42.

== Accidents and incidents ==
In December 2004, the Air Lithuania ATR 42 operating for Lithuanian Airlines, touched tree tops and allegedly almost crashed at the approach to the Boryspil International Airport in Kyiv, Ukraine .

== Services ==
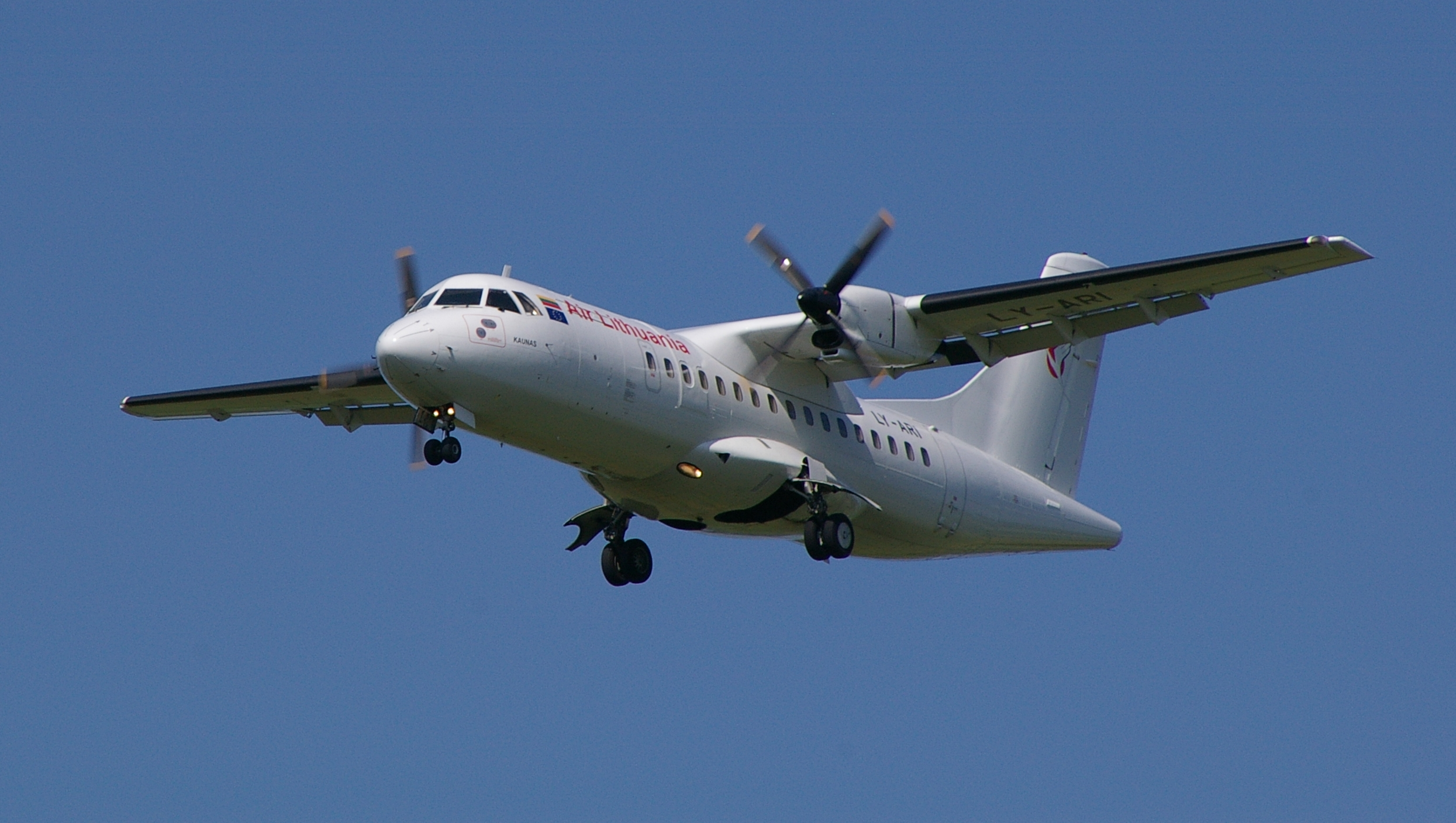
Air Lithuania ATR 42-300 (in 2005)

Air Lithuania operated the following services (as of October 2004):

- Domestic scheduled destinations: Kaunas and Palanga
- International scheduled destinations: Billund, Hamburg, Malmö and Oslo
