= ATR 42 =

Regional turboprop airliner family

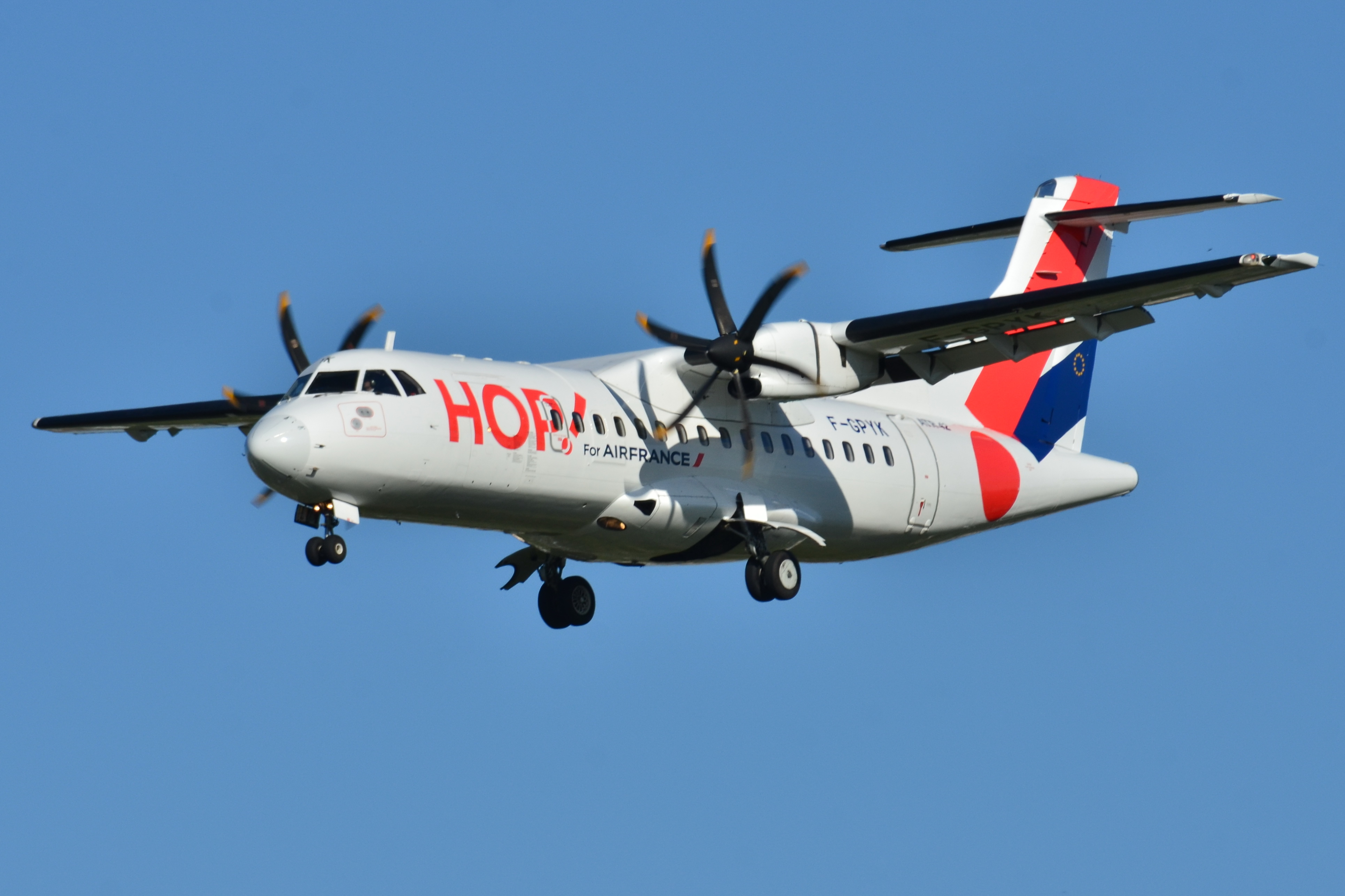
- A HOP! ATR 42-500 on final approach

General information
- Type: Turboprop Regional airliner
- National origin: France/Italy
- Manufacturer: ATR
- Status: In production, in service
- Primary users: FedEx Feeder Canadian North
- Number built: 503

History
- Manufactured: 1984–present
- Introduction date: 3 December 1985
- First flight: 16 August 1984
- Developed into: ATR 52 (unbuilt); ATR 72

The ATR 42 is a regional airliner produced by Franco-Italian manufacturer ATR, with final assembly in Toulouse, France. On 4 November 1981, the aircraft was launched with ATR, as a joint venture between French Aérospatiale (now part of Airbus) and Aeritalia (now Leonardo S.p.A.). The ATR 42-300 performed its maiden flight on 16 August 1984 and type certification was granted during September 1985. Launch customer Air Littoral operated its first revenue-earning flight in December of that year.

The high-wing airliner is powered by two turboprop engines, Pratt & Whitney Canada PW120s. The number "42" in its name is derived from the aircraft's original standard seating capacity of 42 passengers. Later variants are upgraded with new avionics, a glass cockpit, and newer engine versions. The ATR 42 is the basis for the stretched ATR 72, introduced in October 1989.

== Development ==
During the 1960s and 1970s, European aircraft manufacturers had, for the most part, undergone considerable corporate restructuring, including mergers and consolidations, as well as moving towards collaborative multinational programmes, such as the newly launched Airbus A300. In line with this trend towards intra-European co-operation, French aerospace manufacturer Aérospatiale and Italian aviation conglomerate Aeritalia commenced discussions on the topic of working together to develop an all-new regional airliner. Prior to this, both companies had been independently conducting studies for their own aircraft concepts, the AS 35 design in the case of Aerospatiale and the AIT 230 for Aeritalia, to conform with demand within this sector of the market as early as 1978.

=== Initial development ===
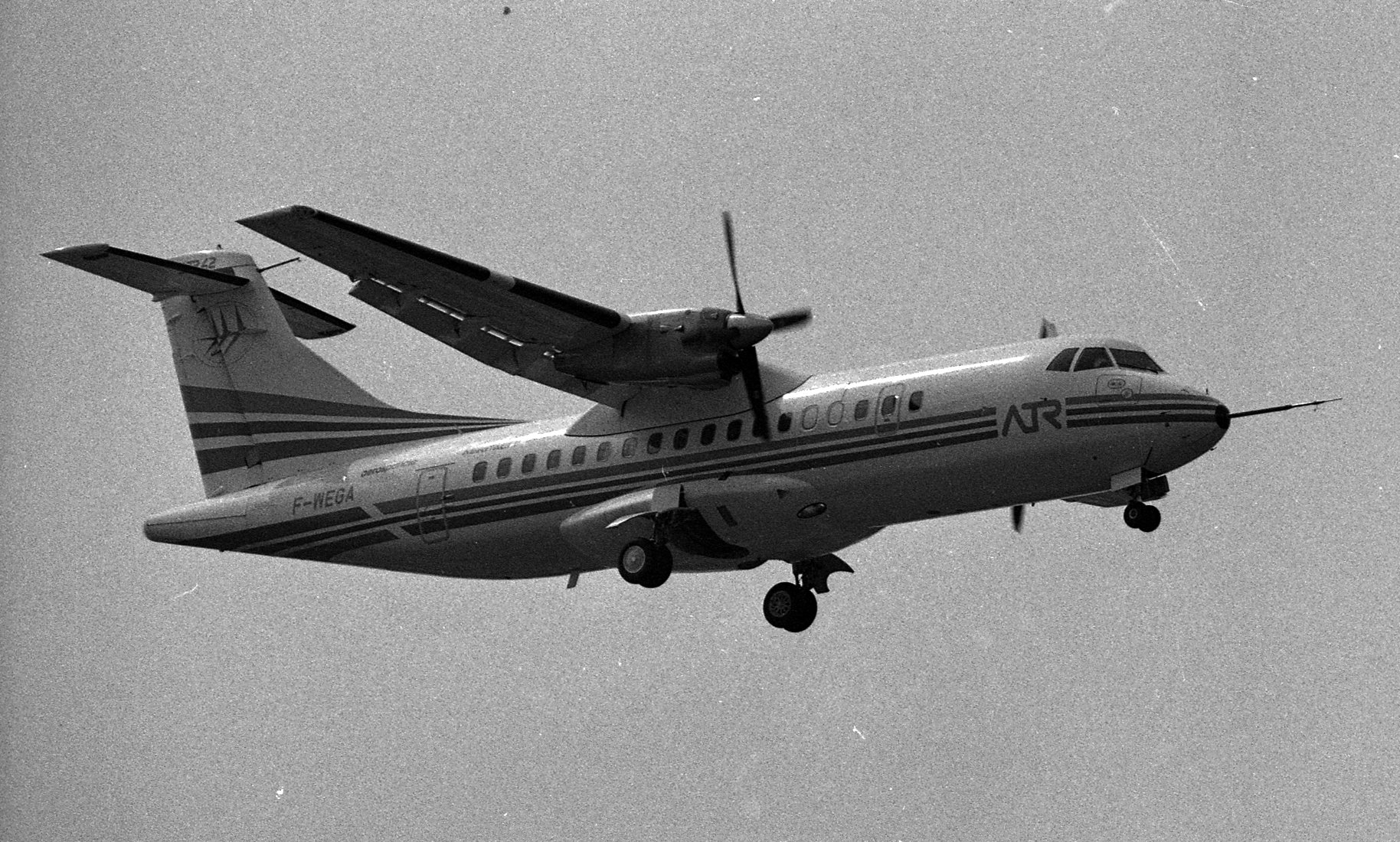
First flight at Toulouse–Blagnac Airport, 16 August 1984

On 4 November 1981, a formal co-operation agreement was signed by Aeritalia chairman Renato Bonifacio and Aerospatiale chairman Jacques Mitterrand in Paris. This agreement signaled not only the merger of their efforts, but also of their separate concept designs together into a single complete aircraft design for the purpose of pursuing its development and manufacture as a collaborative joint venture. The consortium then targeted a similar unit cost, but a 430 kg (950 lb) fuel consumption over a 200 nmi (370 km; 230 mi) sector, nearly half the 790 kg (1,750 lb) required by its 40–50 seat competitors, the British Aerospace HS.748 and Fokker F.27, and planned a 58-seat ATR XX stretch.

This agreement served not only as the basis and origins of the ATR company, but also as the effective launch point of what would become the fledgling firm's first aircraft, which was designated as the ATR 42. By 1983, ATR's customer services division has been set up, readying infrastructure worldwide to provide support for ATR's upcoming aircraft to any customer regardless of location. On 16 August 1984, the first ATR 42 conducted its maiden flight from Toulouse Airport, France. During September 1985, both the French Directorate General for Civil Aviation (DGCA) and the Italian Italian Civil Aviation Authority awarded type certification for the type, clearing it to commence operational service.

=== Introduction ===
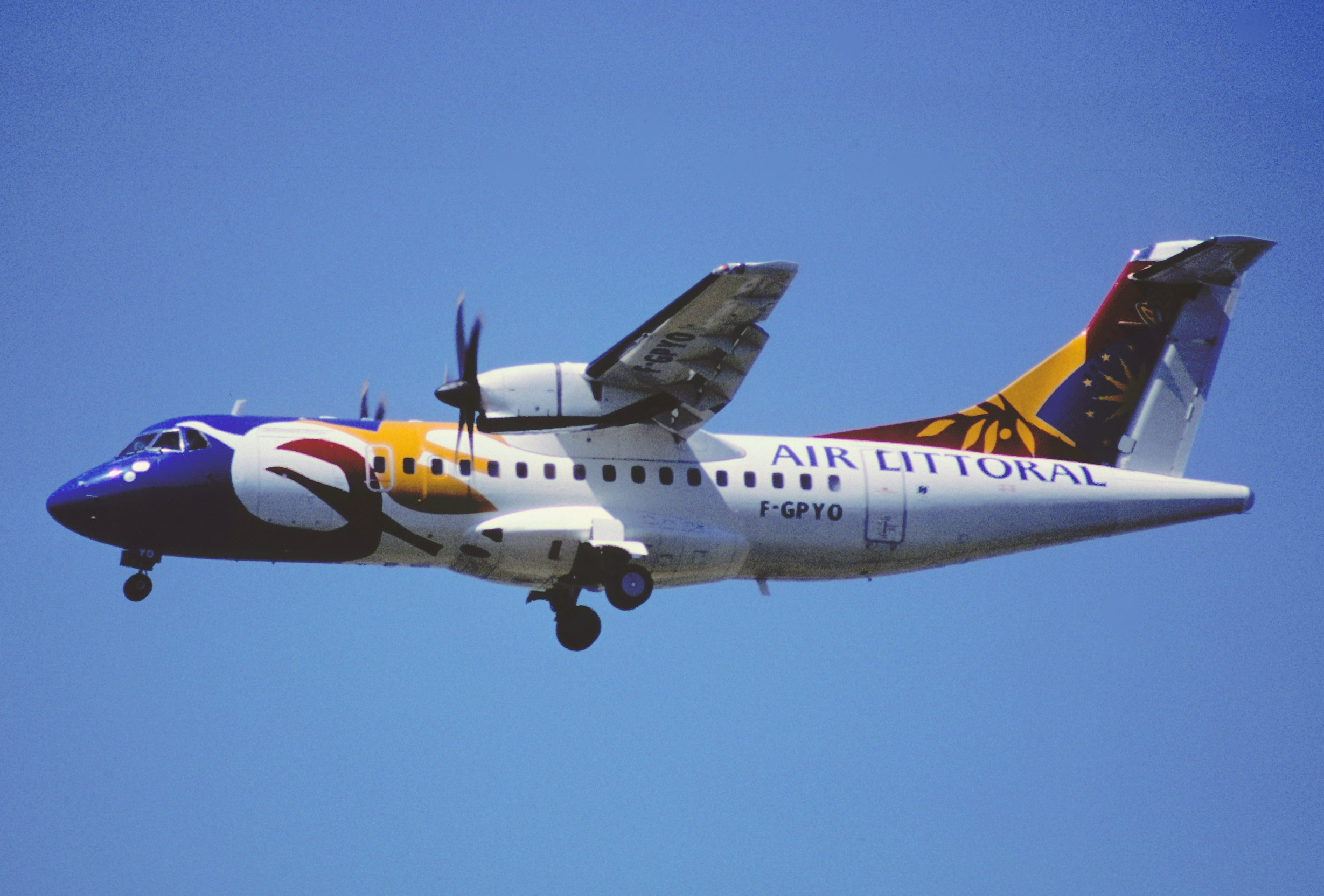
An ATR 42 of Air Littoral, which served as the type's launch operator

On 3 December 1985, the first production aircraft, designated as the ATR 42-300, was delivered to French launch customer Air Littoral, with the first revenue service, between Béziers Cap d'Agde Airport and Paris Orly airport taking place on 23 December. During January 1986, already confident of the ATR 42's success and of the demand for an enlarged version of the aircraft, ATR announced that the launch of a programme to develop such an aircraft, which was designated as the ATR 72 to reflect its increased passenger capacity.

By the end of 1986, the ATR 42 had accumulated a sizable backlog of orders, which in turn led to a ramping up of the type's rate of production. During August 1988, ATR's marketing efforts in the lucrative North American market resulted in the securing of a large order of 50 ATR-42-300s from US operator Texas Air Corporation; that same year, another American regional carrier, Trans World Express, received the 100th production aircraft. On 1 July 1989, ATR opened their new global training centre for the type in Toulouse, which provided centralised and modern facilities for the training to airline staff and other personnel across the world. During June 1999, the ATR global training center became one of the first European institutions to be recognised as a Type Rating Training Organization, as defined by the Joint Aviation Authorities.

During September 1989, ATR announced it had achieved its original target of 400 sales of the ATR. That same year, deliveries of the enlarged ATR 72 commenced; shortly thereafter, both types commonly were ordered together. Since the smaller ATR 42 is assembled on the same production line as the ATR 72, along with sharing the majority of subsystems, components, and manufacturing techniques, the two types support each other to remain in production. This factor may have been crucial, as by 2015, the ATR 42 was the only 50-seat regional aircraft that was still being manufactured.

=== ATR 42-300/320 ===
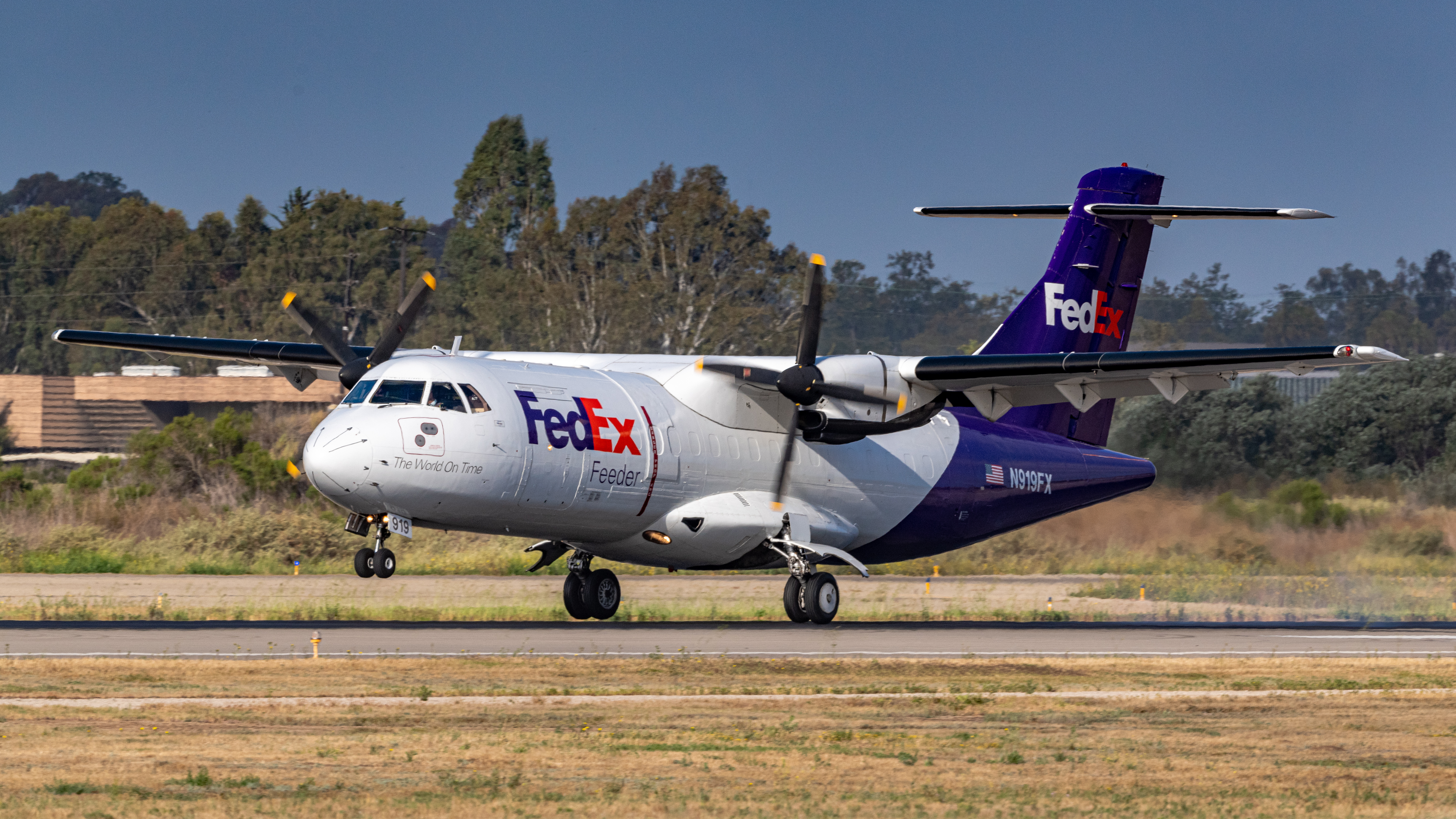
A freighter-configured ATR 42-300, operated by FedEx Feeder

To maintain a technological edge on the highly competitive market for regional airliners during the 1990s, several modifications and improved versions of the ATR 42 were progressively introduced. The initial ATR 42-300 model remained in production until 1996, while the first upgraded (and broadly similar) model, designated as the 'ATR 42-320, was also produced until 1996. The -320 variant principally differed in that it was powered by a pair of the more-powerful PW121 engines, giving it improved performance over the 300. Another variant, the ATR 42-300QC, was a dedicated quick-change (convertible) freight/passenger version of the standard -300 series.

=== ATR 42-500 ===
The next major production version was the ATR 42-500 series, the development of which having been originally announced on 14 June 1993. Performing its maiden flight on 16 September 1994, and awarded certification by the British Civil Aviation Authority and France's DGCA during July 1995; the -500 model was an upgraded aircraft, equipped with new PW127 engines, new six-bladed propellers, improved hot and high performance, increased weight capacity, and an improved passenger cabin. On 31 October 1995, the first ATR 42-500 was delivered to Italian operator Air Dolomiti; on 19 January 1996, the first revenue service to be performed by the type was conducted. On 19 November 2000, 120 min ETOPS were approved.

In addition to new aircraft models, various organisational changes were also implemented. On 10 July 1998, ATR launched its new asset management department. In June 2001, EADS and Alenia Aeronautica, ATR's parent companies, decided to reinforce their partnership, regrouping all industrial activities related to regional airliners underneath the ATR consortium. On 3 October 2003, ATR became one of the first aircraft manufacturers to be certified under ISO 9001-2000 and EN/AS/JISQ 9100, the worldwide quality standard for the aeronautics industry. During July 2004, ATR and Brazilian aircraft manufacturer Embraer announced a cooperation agreement on the AEROChain Portal for the purpose of delivering improved customer service. During April 2009, ATR announced the launch of its 'Door-2-Door' service as a new option in its comprehensive customer-services range.

=== ATR 42-600 ===
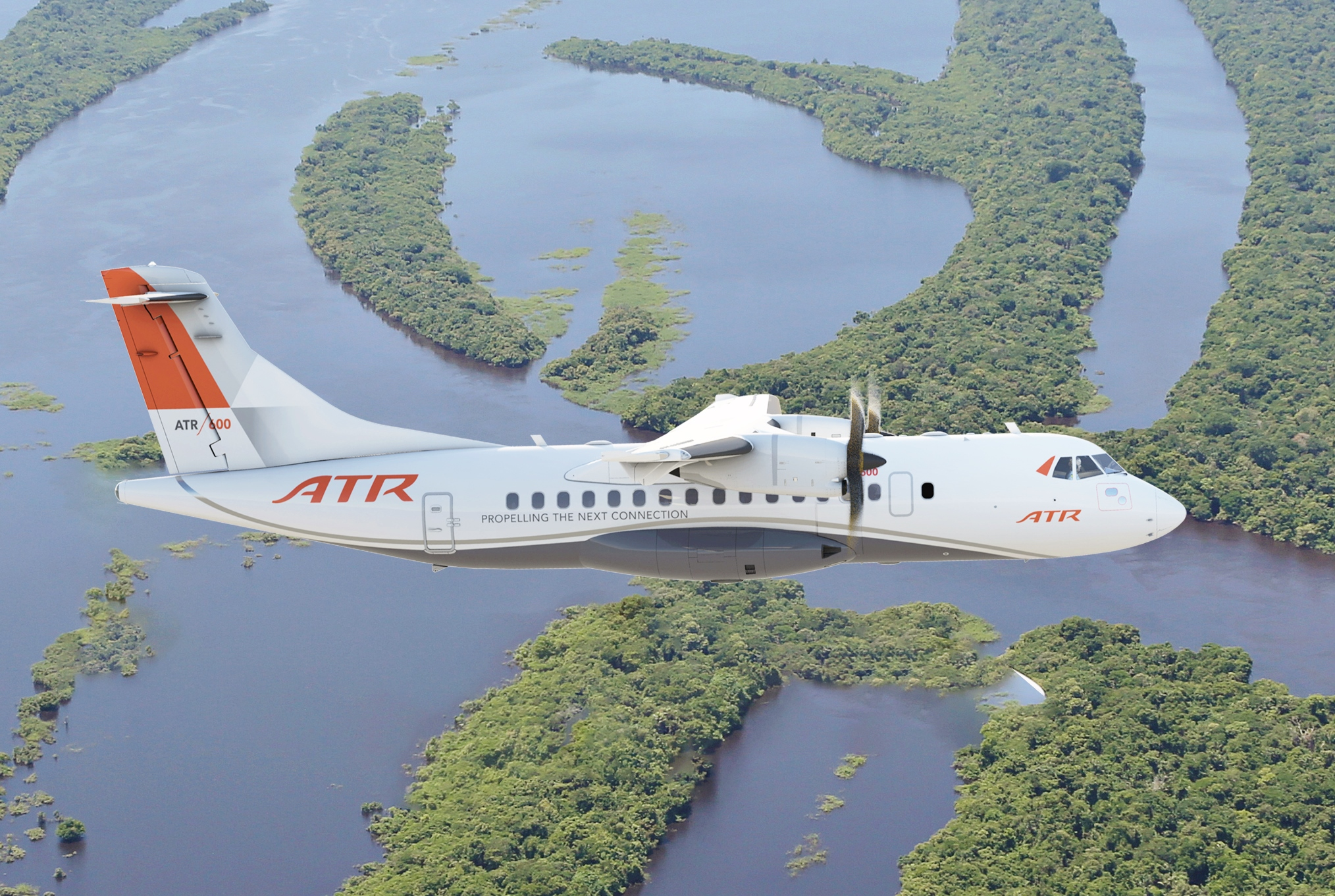
The ATR 42-600 was launched on 2 October 2007, first flew on 4 March 2010, and was first delivered in November 2012.

The current production version is the ATR 42-600 series. On 2 October 2007, ATR CEO Stéphane Mayer announced the launch of the -600 series aircraft; the ATR 42-600 and ATR 72-600 featured various improvements to increase efficiency, dispatch reliability, and lower fuel burn and operating costs. While broadly similar to the earlier -500 model, differences include the adoption of improved PW127M engines, a new glass cockpit, and a variety of other minor improvements. Using the test registration F-WWLY, the prototype ATR 42-600 first flew on 4 March 2010. The first aircraft was delivered to Tanzanian airline Precision Air in November 2012.

As a consequence of strong demand for the -600 series, ATR decided to invest in the establishment of a second, more modern final-assembly line and acquisition of more hangar space at their Toulouse site, along with a new large completion and delivery area; overall, the manufacturing operation expanded to four times the footprint that it had in 2005. Speaking in October 2015, ATR CEO Patrick de Castelbajac stated that the firm was set to produce in excess of 90 aircraft that year, and that the new manufacturing facilities could support a production rate of up to 120 per year. At the time, the company had a backlog of orders for 300 aircraft, sufficient for three years' of production. During 2017, a new in-house financing and leasing division was established by ATR to offer customers a greater degree of support and expand the company's range of services.

Considerable emphasis has been placed upon the continuous development of ATR's aircraft models. Additionally, during the mid-2010s, reports emerged that the development of a further stretched 90-seat ATR model was under consideration as well; allegedly, shareholder Airbus was relatively unenthusiastic on proceeding with such a development, while ATR CEO Fabrice Brégier favoured a focus on resolving manufacturing issues.

=== ATR 42-600S STOL ===
During the late 2010s, ATR conducted a feasibility study into developing the ATR 42's short takeoff and landing (STOL) capabilities, potentially enabling the type to make use of runways as short as 800 m (2,600 ft) via the adoption of enhanced brakes and a drastically modified tail unit; the company viewed this measure as expanding the aircraft's potential and opening new sales possibilities. It could introduce a steep approach capability and operating costs that compare to 30-seaters.

STOL improvements were planned to launched in 2019 to reduce landing distance from 1,100 to 800 m (3,600 to 2,600 ft). Existing control surfaces would be re-engineered with takeoff flaps extended to 25°, and both spoilers deploying at landing and not only for inflight turns, adding an autobrake system, while the rudder is modified to increase its maximum deflection and the vertical stabilizer's size is increased, to counter an engine failure, lowering the minimum control speed.

ATR estimated a market for STOL 20–42 seaters of 800 over 30 years, to serve islands and deliver cargo to short runways.The ATR 42-600S empty weight was to be reduced with lighter seats and galley fittings. The variant was officially announced at the June 2019 Paris Air Show. Irish lessor Elix Aviation Capital committed to being the launch customer, to take 10 aircraft from 2022 to 2024; commitments from Air Tahiti and another undisclosed customer brought the total order book to 17.

On 9 October 2019, ATR launched the ATR 42-600S at the European Regions Airline Association General Assembly, with 20 commitments including from Elix Aviation Capital (10 aircraft) and Air Tahiti (two aircraft).Capable of operating from 800 m (2,600 ft) runways with up to 42 passengers, certification was expected for the second half of 2022 before first delivery. The ATR 42-600S was expected to be able to access close to 500 airports with an 800–1,000 m (2,600–3,300 ft) runway, expanding its addressable market by 25%. 800 m runway operation is limited to 200 nmi (370 km; 230 mi) long flights with 70% used seats.

The variant made a 2h 15min maiden flight on 11 May 2022, with the larger rudder planned be fitted at the end of 2022 before the certification phase started in 2023.

In November 2024 ATR terminated the development of the 42-600S STOL version, opting instead to focus on improving the efficiency of the entire ATR 42 and ATR 72 families.

== Design ==
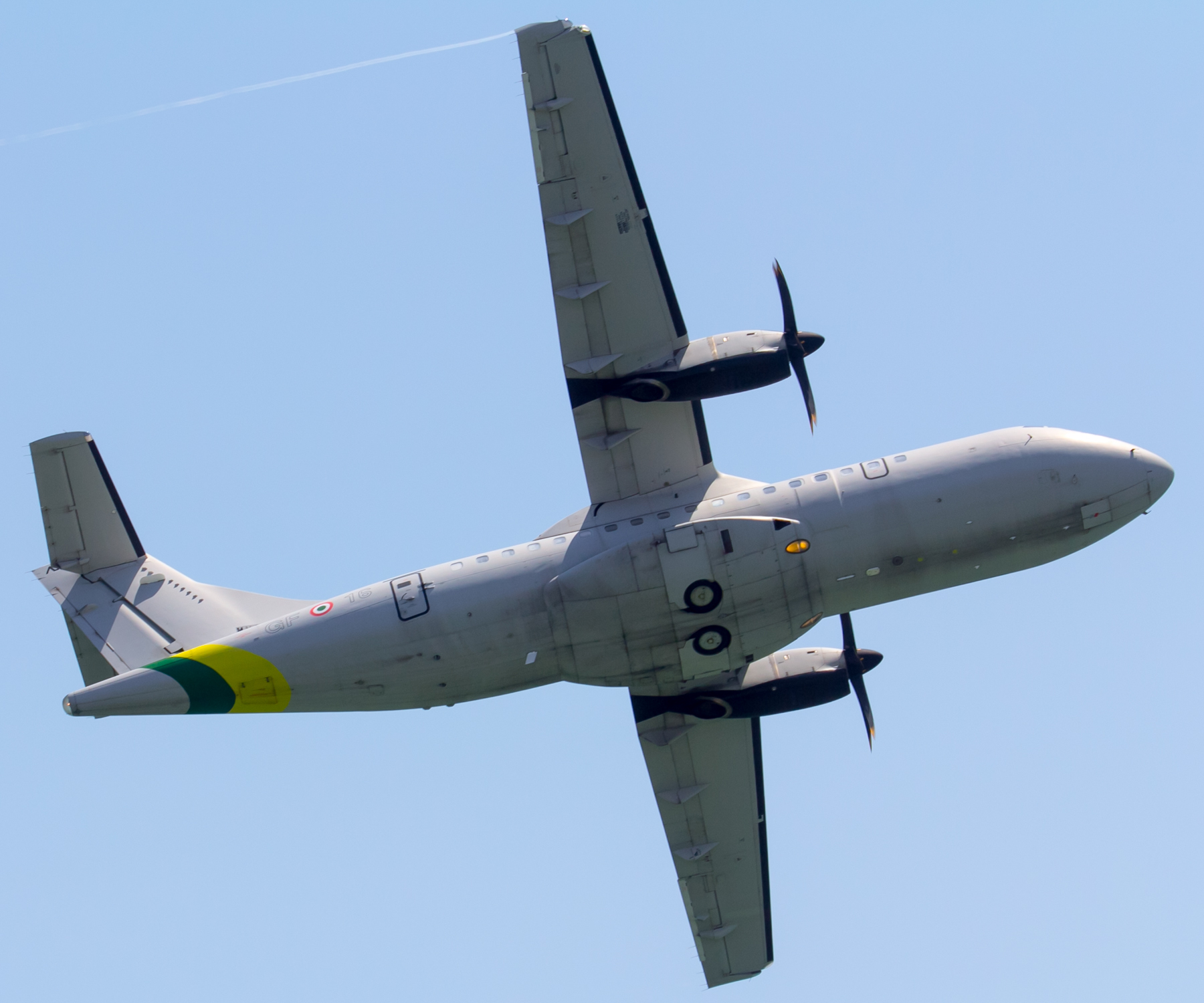
The ATR 42 has a straight wing with an 11.1 aspect ratio, and retractable landing gear in fairings under the fuselage, with wheel sides visible in flight.

The ATR 42 is a straight high-wing airliner with twin turboprops and a T-tail, certified in the transport category, and powered by Pratt & Whitney Canada PW120s. It has deicing boots to fly in icing conditions and a retractable landing gear in fairings under the fuselage, with wheel sides visible in flight. It has no Auxiliary Power Unit (APU), but can still be autonomous in ground operations, as it has a propeller brake on the starboard engine, allowing the engine to remain running to provide power on the ground.

It has a pressurized cabin with a circular cross-section, with a 2.57 m (8 ft 5 in) inside width for four-abreast seating, allowing 48 seats at a 30 in (760 mm) seat pitch. It has a 54.5 m^{2} (587 sq ft) wing area and a 24.57 m (80.6 ft) wing span, for a 11.1 wing aspect ratio. It has a 18,600 kg (41,000 lb) MTOW, for a 341 kg/m^{2} (70 lb/sq ft) wing loading. It can reach a cruise speed of 300 kn (350 mph; 560 km/h) true air speed, with a fuel flow of 811 kg/h (1,788 lb/h): a fuel economy of 1.46 kg/km (5.96 lb/nmi) or 3.8 L/100 km (74 mpg_{‑imp}; 62 mpg_{‑US}) per seat with 48 seats and a jet fuel density of 0.8.

== Operational history ==
On 21 August 1990, US airline American Eagle placed a large order for ATRs, composed of 41 ATR 42s and 59 ATR 72s, further consolidating ATR's position in North America. On 5 September 1997, American Eagle took delivery of the 500th ATR to be built. On 5 June 1998, Tarom, the national carrier of Romania, accepted delivery of its first two ATR 42-500s, of a batch of seven aircraft ordered a year earlier. On 28 June 1998, ATR gained a foothold in the Cuban market following an order from airline Cubana de Aviacion for the ATR 42. During 2000, the combined global ATR fleet attained its 10,000,000th flight, during which a cumulative distance around 4 billion km (2.5 billion statute miles) had been traversed, and around 450 million passengers had flown onboard ATR-built aircraft. In 2007, a new record was set for the programme's sales; 113 new ATR aircraft having been ordered during a single year.

2011 was another record-breaking year for sales at ATR. According to ATR's CEO Filippo Bagnato, sales had continued to grow during the Great Recession despite the downturn experienced by most aviation companies as "fuel consumption that can be half that of the alternatives and [with] lower maintenance costs". Bagnato noted the strength of Africa as a market for the type, as well as the firm's aircraft being capable of serving destinations that would otherwise be inaccessible with other aircraft due to the austere conditions of many airstrips and runways in the region, as well as the ability to operate autonomously without any reliance upon ground support equipment. For 2013, ATR claimed a 48% global market share for regional aircraft deliveries between 50 and 90 seats (comprising both turboprops and jets), making it the dominant manufacturer within this sector of the market. That same year, during which firm orders for 10 ATR 42-600s and 79 ATR 72-600s were recorded, leasing companies were responsible for 70% of these; according to ATR's CEO Filippo Bagnato: "Years ago, we were not even considered by the lessors; now they see ATRs as a good investment".

During May 1997, ATR had achieved its first breakthrough sale in China, placed by operator China Xinjiang Airlines and the CAAC. By 2013, while the Asia Pacific region had comprised the majority of ATR's sales when geographically ranked, but orders from Chinese airlines remained elusive; Bagnato ascribed this anomaly to local market conditions dictating the typical use of larger aircraft, as well as a Chinese government policy of imposing high tariffs on the import of foreign-built, fixed-wing aircraft. During late 2014, ATR set up a new office in Beijing, and hired several former Airbus sales personnel with the aim of launching the type on the Chinese market. ATR believed that many of the already-flown routes did not suit larger 150-seat aircraft; however, of the roughly 2,600 commercial aircraft flying in China at that time, only 68 had a capacity less than 90 seats and of these, fewer than 20 aircraft were powered by turboprop engines.

In response to airlines often wanting to phase out their early production ATR models to replace them with the latest generation ATR series, as well as to answer demand from cargo operators for the type, ATR has operated two separate dedicated freighter conversion programmes, known as the Bulk Freighter (tube version) and the ULD Freighter. Both conversions involve complete stripping of furnishings along with the addition of floor strengthening, new window plugs and 9 g restraining nets, six additional longitudinal tracks for added flexibility, and an E-Class cabin; the ULD model can accommodate standard ULD-packaged cargo, such as LD3 containers or 88 in × 108 in (2.2 m × 2.7 m) pallets, which were loaded via a large cargo door located on the port forward side. Undertaken by a range of companies, such as Alenia subsidiary Aeronavali, Texas-based M7 Aerospace; French firms Indraéro Siren and Aeroconseil, Canadian Infinion Certification Engineering, and Spanish company Arrodisa, by October 2012, in excess of one-fifth of all first-generation ATR 42 and ATR 72 aircraft had already been converted to freighters.

During January 2017, Japanese regional airliner Japan Air Commuter (JAC) has taken delivery of its first ATR 42-600, becoming the first owner-operator of the type in the nation. The aircraft was one of nine to have been ordered by JAC, along with options for a further 14 ATR 42s, as a replacement for its aging Saab 340 fleet; reportedly, JAC is considering replacing its Bombardier Q400s with ATRs, as well.

Silver Airways started to operate the ATR 42-600 on 22 April 2019, making it the first airline to fly the -600 variant in the USA. The carrier has 16 firm orders for ATR turboprops with options to purchase 30 additional aircraft from ATR through lessor Nordic Aviation Capital.

In September 2024, Nepalese airline Buddha Air became the first to retire their ATR 42-320 by completing its economic life cycle of 70000 cycles.

== Variants ==
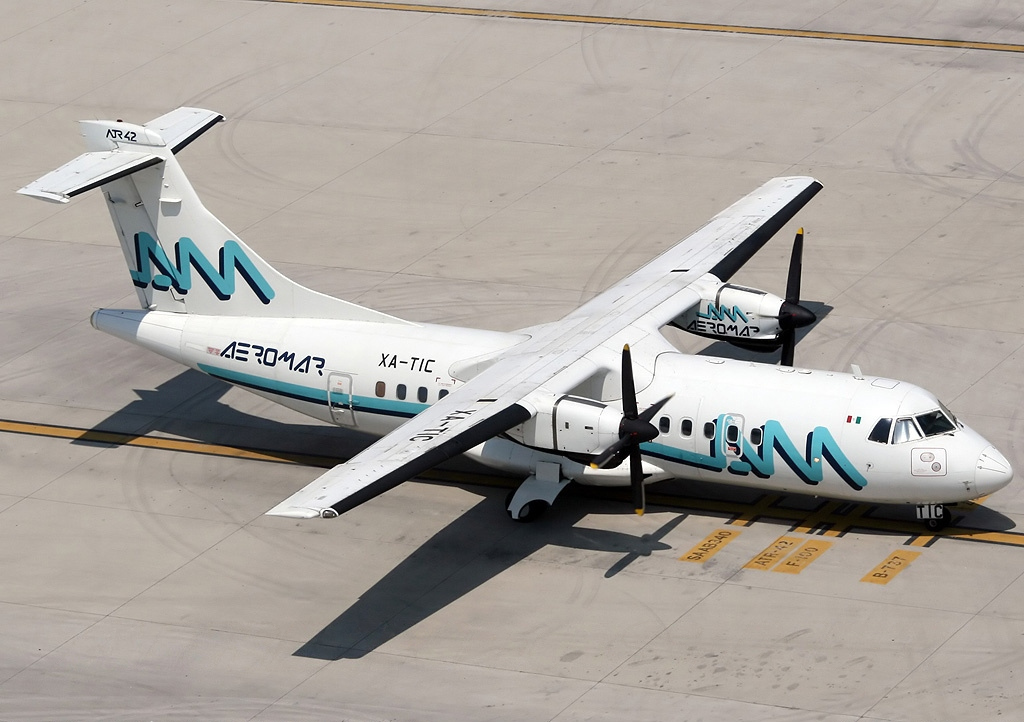
Early -200/-300/-320 have four-blade propellers, such as this Aeromar ATR-42.

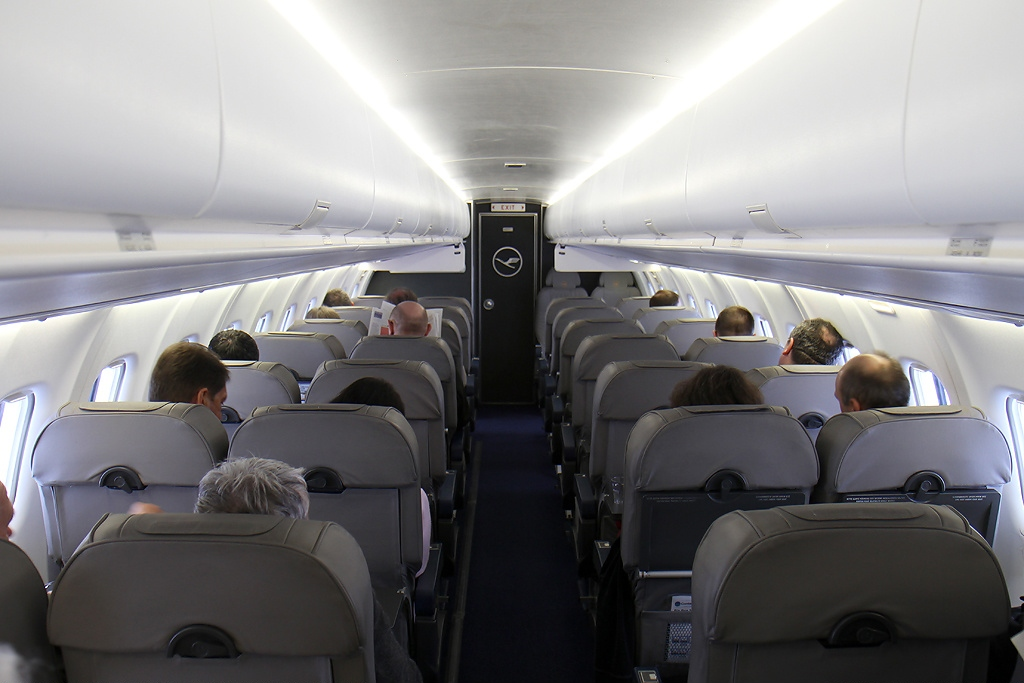
-500 cabin

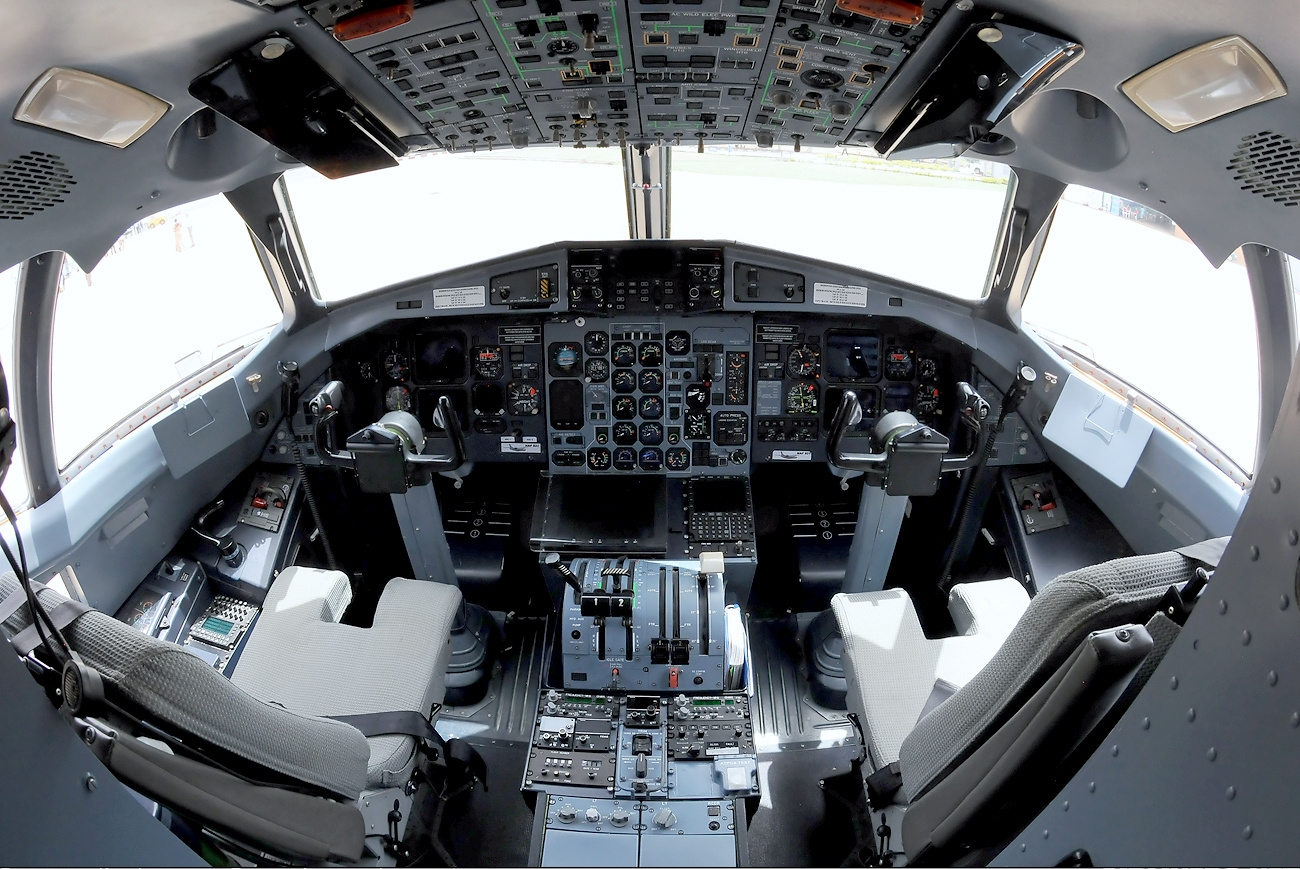
-500 Cockpit

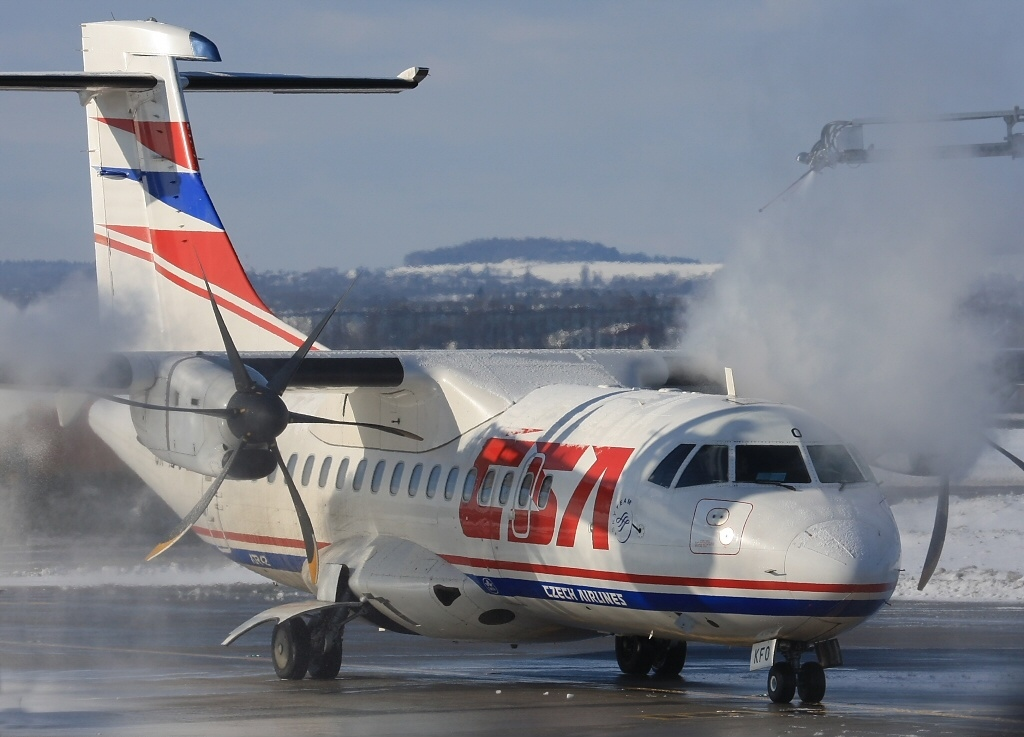
Later -400/-500/-600 have propellers with six blades.

=== ATR 42-200 ===
The -200 was the original ATR 42 prototype, and only a few were built for testing purposes. It was powered by Pratt & Whitney Canada PW120 engines rated at 1,800 shp (1,300 kW).

=== ATR 42-300 ===
The -300 was the standard production version. This model was manufactured until 1996. It was powered by Pratt & Whitney Canada PW120 engines rated at 2,000 shp (1,500 kW).

=== ATR 42-320 ===
The -320 was an improved version of the -300 powered by PW121 engines (2100 shp). It was designed to have better performance, especially in hot and high conditions.

=== ATR 42-400 ===
The ATR 42-400 is an upgraded version of the -320 using six-bladed propellers on otherwise identical PW121 engines and small mini winglets on the edge of the wings. Three ATR 42-400s were delivered to the government of Italy as the ATR 42 "Surveyor" version. The only two civilian ATR 42-400s produced (msn 487 and 491) were delivered to CSA Czech Airlines in 1995/1996 as an interim upgrade prior to delivery of -500s. In 2006, these two aircraft were sold to Conviasa.

=== ATR 42-500 ===
The ATR 42-500 is a further upgraded version, the first delivery of which occurring during October 1995. It has many improvements for performance and passenger comfort, including new engines, new propellers, a newly designed cabin, and increased weight. It has six-bladed propellers powered by PW127E engines rated at 2,400 shp (1,800 kW) for improved hot and high performance and increased cruise speed. The engines are flat rated for 45 °C. Propellers are electrically controlled and are made from composite. It has an increased maximum takeoff weight, allowing for more cargo and greater range. Due to the six-bladed propellers and better insulation, it has reduced noise levels. The newest version has CATII capability and dual Honeywell HT1000 FMS installation.

=== ATR 42-600 ===
During October 2007, the launch of the ATR 42-600 series was announced. Akin to the ATR 72-500, the -600 series featured the PW127M as its standard engine (providing 5% additional thrust, thus improving performance on short runways, in hot weather, and at high altitude); the "boost function" activates the additional power as needed. It also features a glass cockpit flight deck, complete with five wide LCD screens, that replaced the previous electronic flight instrument system; additionally, a multipurpose computer enhances flight safety and operational capabilities. Avionics supplied by Thales provides CAT III and required navigation performance capabilities. It also includes lighter, more comfortable seats and larger overhead baggage bins. According to the third issue of its EASA's Type Certificate, ATR 42-600 is ATR's marketing designation for the -500 series when fitted with the new avionics suite) or "glass Cockpit". The ATR 42-600 designation is not recognised by EASA as a certified aircraft model or variant, and is not used on ATR certified/approved documentation; instead, only "Mod 5948", "ATR 42-500 with Mod 5948", "ATR 42-500 fitted with NAS", or "ATR 42-500 600 version" is used.

=== ATR 42-600S ===
The ATR 42-600S was the STOL (short takeoff and landing) variant of the -600. The aircraft was planned to be capable of operating from runways as short as 800-metre-long (2,600 ft) with up to 34 passengers, and 890-metre-long (2,920 ft) fully seated (48 passengers) on short routes. ATR launched the ATR 42-600S at the ERA General Assembly, with 20 commitments including from Elix Aviation Capital (10 aircraft) and Air Tahiti (two aircraft). Certification was expected for the second half of 2022 before first delivery.

In November 2024 ATR decided to halt development of the 42-600S, due to "a reduced addressable market compared to the initial forecast".

=== ATR 42-600/-600S HighLine Edition ===
The ATR 42-600 and ATR 42-600S HighLine had an executive cabin layout, otherwise it is the same as its original counterpart.

=== Other versions ===
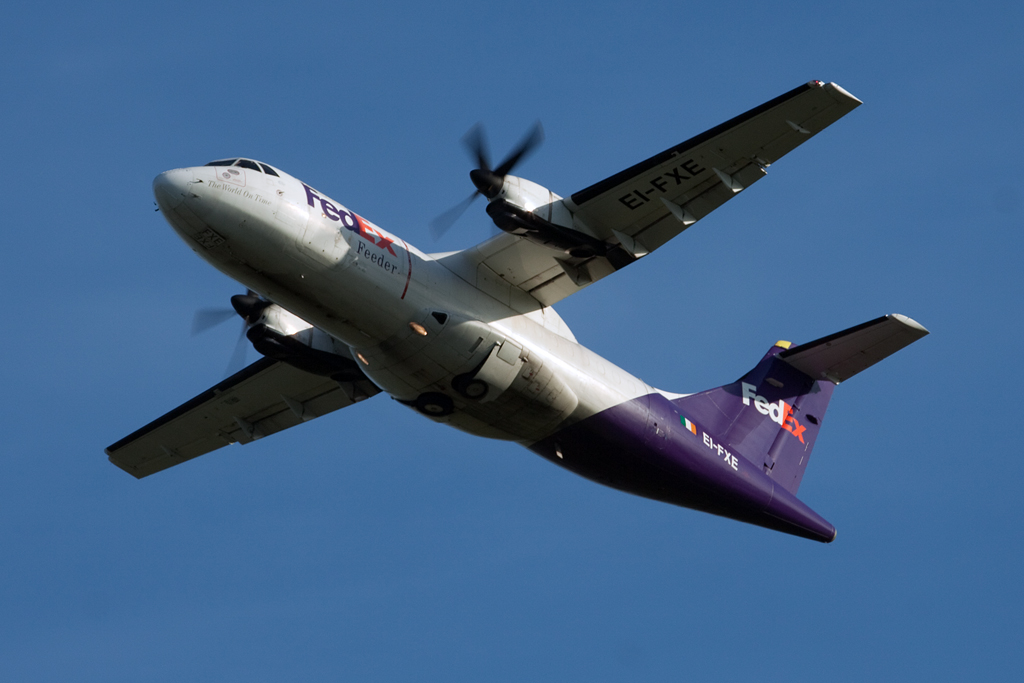
FedEx Express ATR-42 cargo variant

Cargo variant

Bulk (tube versions) and ULD freighter (large cargo door). An STC exists to convert all ATR-42 variants to all-cargo transport aircraft. FedEx, UPS, and DHL are major operators of the type.

ATR Surveyor

The ATR-42 "Surveyor" is a maritime patrol version of the -400.

Others

VIP transport and in-flight inspection versions of the -500 also exist.

== Operators ==
=== Civilian operators ===
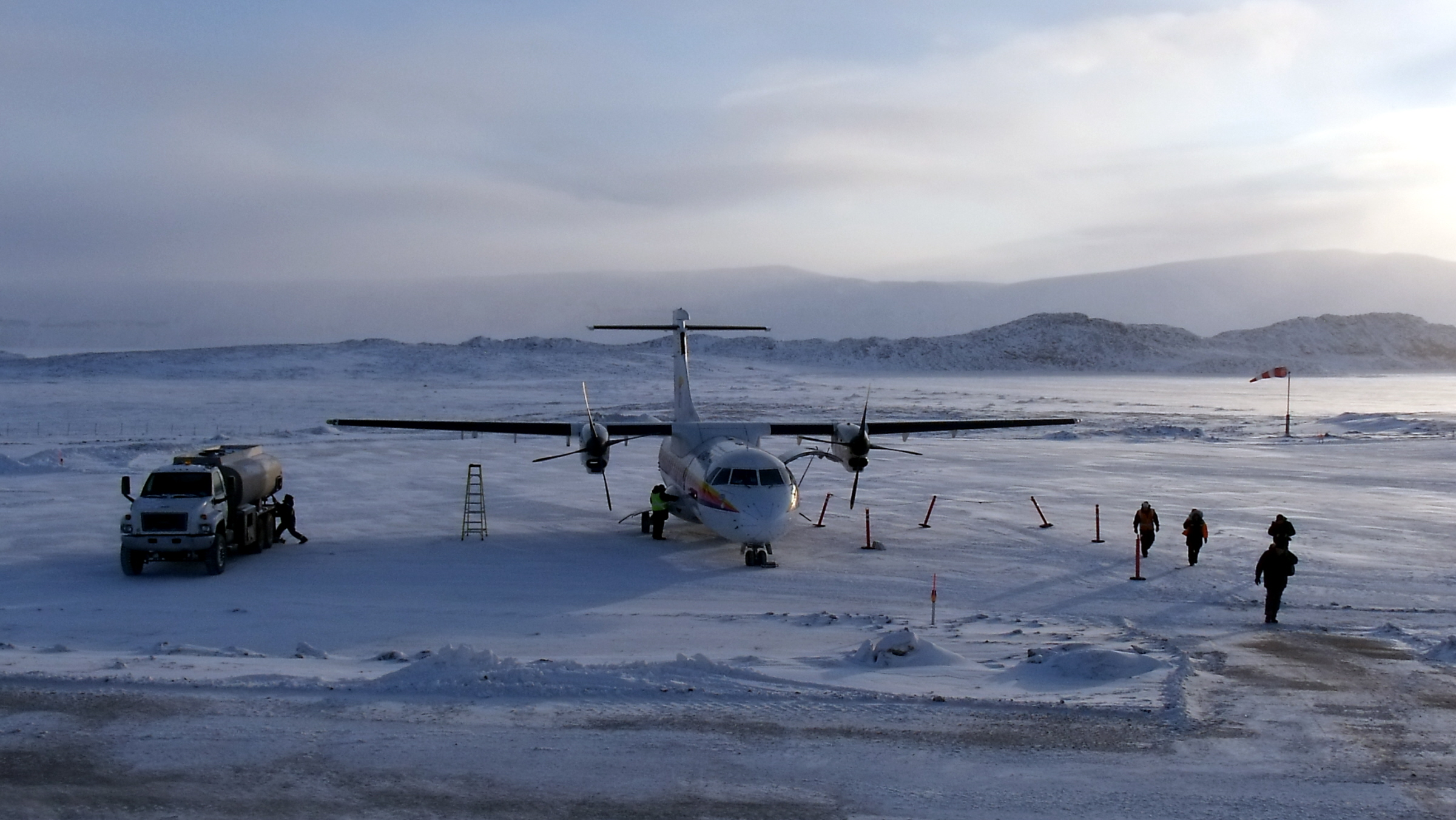
First Air ATR 42–300 in Ikpiarjuk (Arctic Bay), Nunavut Canada

See List of ATR 42 operators.

Airline operators with more than 5 aircraft
| Airline | 300 | 320 | 500 | 600 | 600S | Total |
|---|---|---|---|---|---|---|
| Canadian North | 5 | 2 | 8 | – | – | 15 |
| Danish Air Transport | 2 | 2 | 3 | – | – | 7 |
| EasyFly | – | – | 2 | 12 | – | 14 |
| Empire Airlines | 8 | 3 | – | – | – | 11 |
| FedEx Express | 11 | 6 | – | – | – | 17 |
| Japan Air Commuter | – | – | – | 9 | – | 9 |
| Loganair | – | – | 5 | 2 | – | 7 |
| Mountain Air Cargo | 6 | 2 | – | – | – | 8 |
| Pakistan International Airlines | – | – | 3 | – | – | 3 |
| SATENA | – | – | 4 | 4 | – | 8 |

On 1 August 2017, Silver Airways placed orders for 20 ATR 42-600 aircraft, marking the entry of the -600 into the U.S. market, with four in service as of fourth quarter 2019.

By November 2018, Loganair was to replace its Saab 340s and Saab 2000s, costly to operate and maintain, mostly the 2000, with around 20 ATR 42s over four to five years from the third quarter of 2019.

=== Military operators ===
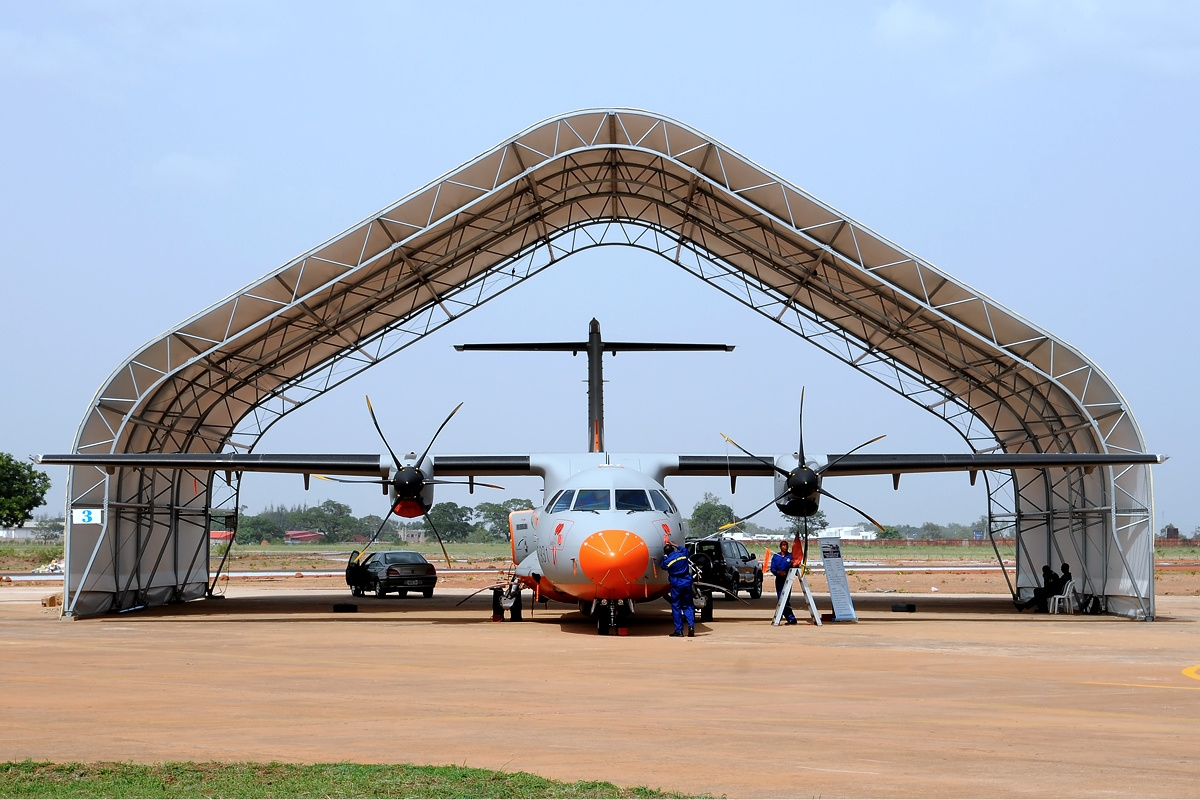
Nigerian Air Force ATR-42 Surveyor

As of August 2022, 6 ATR 42s were in military service.

- Colombian Navy: 1
- Nigerian Air Force: 2 MPAs (1 crashed)
- Myanmar Air Force: 3 special mission aircraft
- Senegalese Air Force: 1

=== Government operators ===
- French Service des avions français instrumentés pour la recherche en environnement: An ATR 42-320 used for environmental research purposes (F-HMTO)
- Indonesian Directorate General of Marine and Fisheries Resources Surveillance: An ATR 42-320, operated by Trigana Air.
- Italian Corps of the Port Captaincies – Coast Guard: 3 MPs
- Italian Guardia di Finanza: 5 MPs
- Senegal Asecna

=== Former operators ===
- Aero Trasporti Italiani
- Air France Hop – 13 ATR 42-500s.
- Air Lithuania – 3 ATR 42-300s.
- Air Littoral
- Air Wales
- Alliance Air
- American Eagle Airlines
- Bangkok Airways
- Colombian Air Force
- Colombian National Police
- Croatia Airlines
- Gabonese Air Force
- Iran Aseman Airlines – 1 ATR 42-300.
- Israir
- Libyan Air Force (1951–2011): 1 MP
- Línea Turística Aereotuy
- Nordic Regional Airlines
- Nusantara Air Charter
- Polish Air Force leased one ATR 42-300 for six months in 2002.
- Royal Air Maroc – 4 ATR 42-300.
- SBA Airlines – 2 ATR 42-300 and 12 ATR 42-320.
- Si Fly – 3 ATR 42-300.
- Silver Airways
- Thai Airways
- TransAsia Airways
- West Wind Aviation
- Ohana by Hawaiian

== Accidents and incidents ==
The ATR 42 has been involved in 48 aviation accidents and incidents including 34 hull losses. Those resulted in 301 fatalities.

- On 15 October 1987, Aero Trasporti Italiani Flight 460, an (ATI) ATR 42-312, crashed on Conca di Crezzo, Italy during flight from Milan-Linate to Cologne Bonn Airport, Germany. All 37 on board died. Icing conditions existed.
- On 21 August 1994, Royal Air Maroc Flight 630, an ATR 42-312, crashed into the Atlas Mountains, killing all 44 people on board. It was claimed the pilot deliberately disengaged the autopilot and crashed the aircraft.
- On 30 July 1997, Air Littoral Flight 701, an ATR 42-500, overran runway 23 at Peretola Airport in Italy after a flight from Nice Côte d'Azur Airport in France. One of the crew was killed out of the 3 crew and 14 passengers. The aircraft was written off in the accident.
- On 11 October 1999, an Air Botswana captain deliberately crashed an ATR 42-320 into the airline's other two ATR 42s parked on the apron at Gaborone Airport and took off, killing him, with no other casualties.
- On 12 November 1999, Si Fly Flight 3275 (operating on behalf of the United Nations), an ATR 42-312, crashed into a hill near Mitrovica, Kosovo as it was making a left-hand turn on approach to Pristina International Airport Adem Jashari from Rome Ciampino Airport in Italy, killing all 24 passengers and crew on board.
- On 14 September 2002, Total Linhas Aereas Flight 5561 an ATR 42-312 on a cargo flight between São Paulo-Guarulhos and Londrina crashed while en route near Paranapanema, killing the only two crew members.
- On 21 February 2008, Santa Barbara Airlines Flight 518, an ATR 42-300, crashed in the Andes near Mérida, Venezuela, during a flight from Mérida to Simon Bolivar International Airport in Caracas. The aircraft was carrying 43 passengers and 3 crew. All died.
- On 13 September 2010, Conviasa Flight 2350, an ATR 42-320, crashed 10 kilometres (6.2 mi) west of Manuel Carlos Piar Guayana Airport, Ciudad Guayana, Venezuela, on a domestic scheduled passenger flight from Santiago Mariño Caribbean International Airport, Porlamar. Of 51 passengers and crew on board, 34 survived the accident while 17 died.

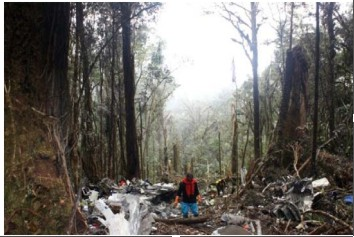
Trigana Air Service 267 crash site

- On 16 August 2015, Trigana Air Service Flight 267, an ATR 42-300, crashed into a mountain in the Bintang highlands on approach to Oksibil from Sentani Airport, killing all 54 passengers and crew on board. It is the deadliest crash involving an ATR 42.
- On 7 December 2016, PIA Flight 661 ATR 42-500 with registration AP-BHO crashed in Havelian in Pakistan's Khyber Pakhtunkhwa province, killing all 47 on board. Flight 661 was en route from the town of Chitral to Pakistani capital of Islamabad when it crashed into a mountain.
- On 13 December 2017, West Wind Aviation Flight 280, an ATR 42-320, carrying 22 passengers and three crew members crashed near Fond-du-Lac, Saskatchewan, shortly after takeoff from Fond-du-Lac Airport; no fatalities were reported at the scene, but one of the injured victims died on 25 December. The carrier temporarily grounded its remaining ATR fleet. On 22 December, after identifying deficiencies in its Operational Control System, Transport Canada suspended the Air Operator Certificate of West Wind Aviation.
- On 6 November 2022, around 8:50 local time, Precision Air Flight 494, an ATR 42-500 carrying 39 passengers and four crew members, crashed in Lake Victoria in Tanzania while approaching Bukoba Airport, resulting in 19 fatalities. It is suggested that bad weather might have been a factor into the crash. The two pilots were amongst the fatalities.
- On 17 January 2026 at around 04:20 UTC, an ATR 42-500 registered PK-THT belonging to Indonesia Air Transport, leased for the Directorate General of Marine and Fisheries Resources Surveillance, went missing near South Sulawesi, Indonesia. Debris suspected to have originated from the aircraft has been located near the summit of Mount Bulu Saraung. All 10 people on board the airplane were killed.
- On 5 October 2026 an ATR 42-500MP registered NAF931 belonging to Nigerian Air Force crashed near a naval base in Igbokoda, Ondo State whilst enroute from Benin to Lagos with 20 passengers and 5 crew. All 25 people on board were killed.

== Specifications ==
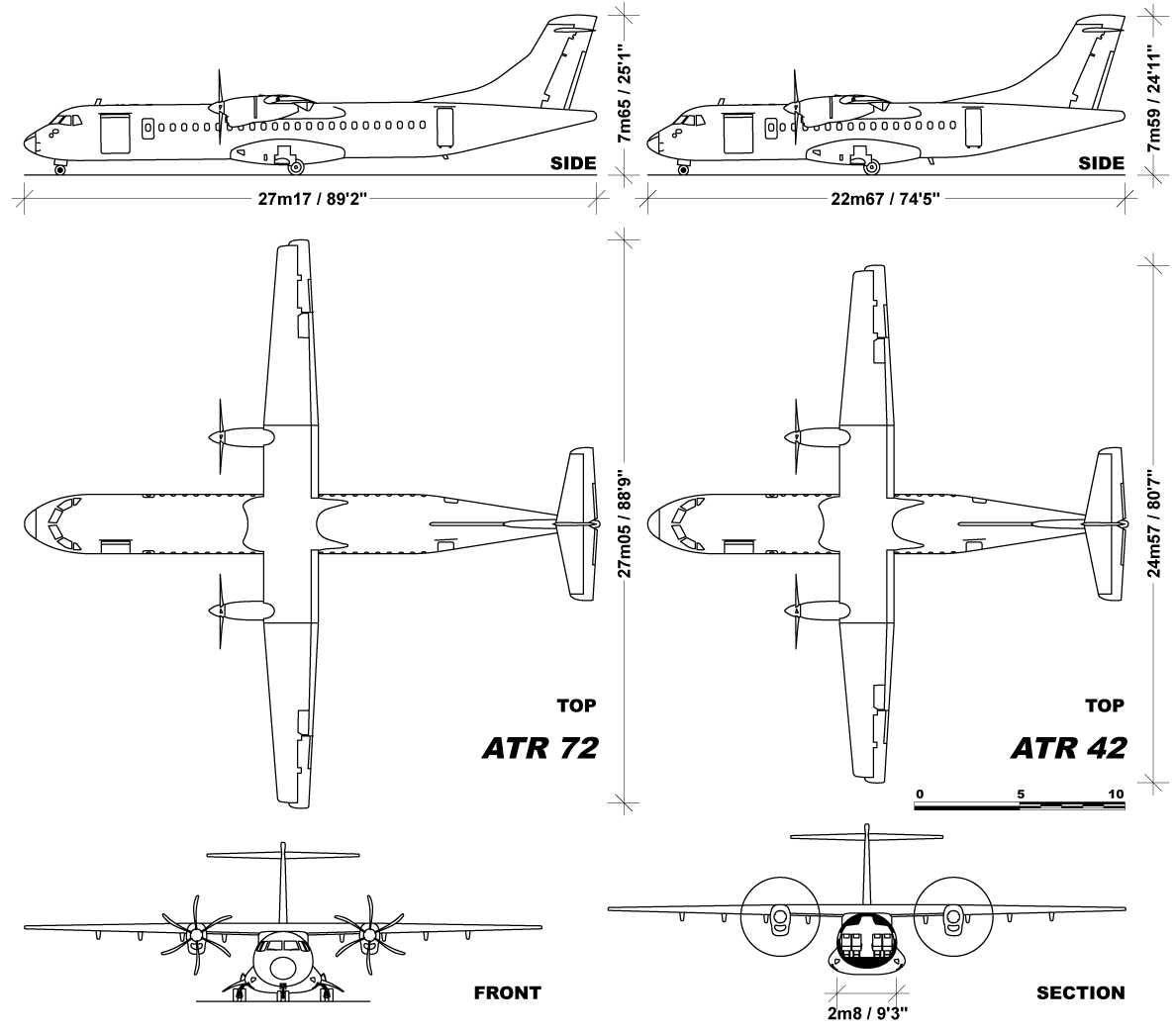
three side view, along ATR 72

ATR 42 variants
| | ATR 42-200 | ATR 42-300 | ATR 42-320 | ATR 42-400 | ATR 42-500 | ATR 42-600 | ATR 42-600S |
|---|---|---|---|---|---|---|---|
| Cockpit crew | Two | | | | | | |
| Seating | 48 at 30 in (760 mm) pitch | | | | | | |
| Length | 22.67 m (74 ft 5 in) | | | | | | |
| Wingspan | 24.57 m (80 ft 7 in) | | | | | | |
| Height | 7.59 m (24 ft 11 in) | | | | | | |
| Wing area | 54.5 m^{2} (587 sq ft) | | | | | | |
| Aspect ratio | 11.08 | | | | | | |
| Empty weight | 10,285 kg (22,675 lb) | | 11,050 kg (24,360 lb) | 11,550 kg (25,460 lb) | 11,750 kg (25,900 lb) | | |
| MTOW | 16,900 kg (37,300 lb) | | 18,200 kg (40,100 lb) | 18,600 kg (41,000 lb) | | | |
| Max payload | 5,255 kg (11,579 lb) | | 5,550 kg (12,235 lb) | 5,450 kg (12,015 lb) | 5,250 kg (11,574 lb) | 5,150 kg (11,353 lb) | |
| Fuel capacity | 4,500 kg (9,900 lb) | | | | | | |
| Engines (×2) | PW120 | PW120 | PW121 | PW121A | PW127E/M | PW127XT-M | PW127XT-L |
| Power | 1,800 hp (1,300 kW) | 2,000 hp (1,500 kW) | 2,100 hp (1,600 kW) | 1,980 hp (1,480 kW) | 2,160 hp (1,610 kW) | 2,400 shp (1,800 kW) | 2,750 shp (2,050 kW) |
| Cruise speed | 270 kn (500 km/h; 310 mph) | | 261 kn (484 km/h; 300 mph) | 300 kn (556 km/h; 350 mph) | 289 kn (535 km/h; 333 mph) | | |
| 48 pax range | 459 nmi (850 km; 528 mi) | | 794 nmi (1,470 km; 914 mi) | 716 nmi (1,326 km; 824 mi) | 726 nmi (1,345 km; 835 mi) | 726 nmi (1,345 km; 835 mi) | |

== See also ==
Related development

- ATR 52
- ATR 72

Aircraft of comparable role, configuration, and era

- Antonov An-140
- De Havilland Canada Dash 8 Series 300
- Fokker 50
- Saab 2000
- Xian MA60
- TVRS-44

== Sources ==
- Jackson, Paul. Jane's All The World's Aircraft 2003–2004. Coulsdon, UK: Jane's Information Group, 2003. ISBN 0-7106-2537-5.
- Taylor, Michael J. H. Brassey's World Aircraft & Systems Directory 1999/2000. London: Brassey's, 1999. ISBN 1-85753-245-7.
