= Alpha Star Aviation =

Private charter airline based in Riyadh, Saudi Arabia

IATA	ICAO	Call sign
--	STT	STAR CHARTER
- Founded: 2010; 16 years ago
- Operating bases: King Khalid International Airport
- Fleet size: 6
- Destinations: Charter
- Headquarters: Riyadh, Saudi Arabia
- Key people: Abdulnaser Al Kheraif (CEO)
- Website: www.alphastarav.com

Alpha Star Aviation Services (ألفا ستار لخدمات الطيران, Alfa Star Likhadamat Altayaran) is a private charter airline based in Riyadh, Saudi Arabia, operating domestic and international scheduled and charter services. Its main base is King Khalid International Airport. In addition to its airline business, Alpha Star also provides air ambulance services.

== Fleet ==
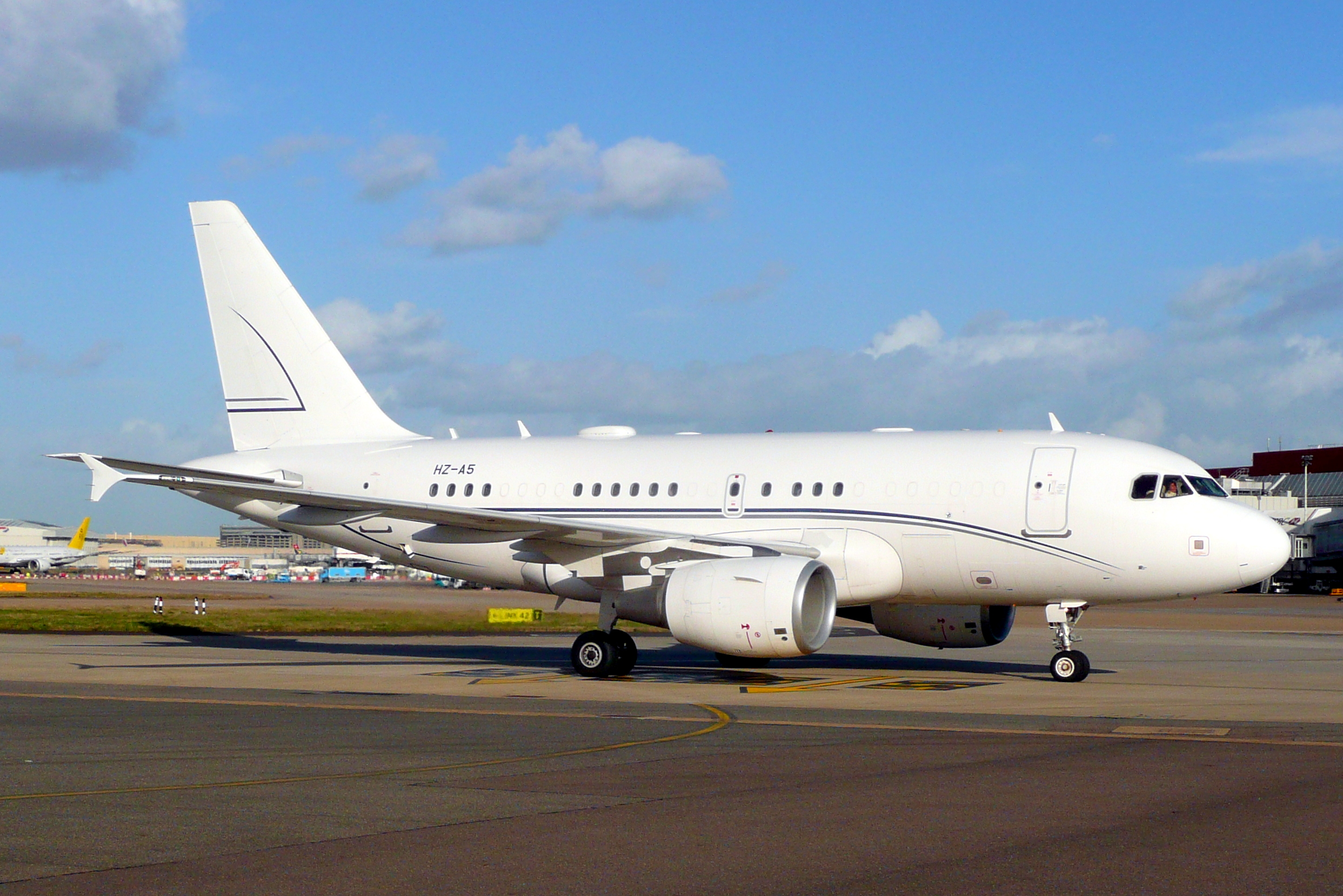
Alpha Star Airbus A318 taxiing at London Heathrow Airport, 2015

=== Current fleet ===
As of August 2025, Alpha Star Aviation operates the following aircraft:

Alpha Star fleet
Aircraft	In Fleet	Notes
Airbus A319	1	
Airbus A320	1	
Airbus A340-200	1	
ATR 42-600	1	
ATR 72-600	2	
Total	6	

=== Former fleet ===
The Alpha Star fleet consisted of the following aircraft (as of April 2018):

Alpha Star former fleet
Aircraft	In Fleet	Notes
ATR 42-600	1	
ATR 72-600	2	
Airbus A318	1	
Airbus A319	1	
Airbus A320	2	
Hawker 900XP	2	VIP or air ambulance
Gulfstream G450	1	
Total	9	

Alpha Star previously operated the following five additional aircraft, all of which were transferred to Sky Prime Aviation when that airline commenced operations in 2016:

- 1 further Airbus A319
- 1 further Airbus A320
- 1 Airbus A330-200 Prestige
- 1 Airbus A340-200
- 1 Airbus A340-600
