= Nusantara Air Charter =

Indonesian airline

IATA	ICAO	Call sign
—	SJK	NUSANTARA
- Founded: 2003
- Ceased operations: 2020
- Hubs: Halim Perdanakusuma International Airport
- Fleet size: 3
- Headquarters: Jakarta
- Key people: Guntur Aradea (CEO), Prastjojo (VP)
- Website: http://nac.co.id/

Nusantara Air Charter was an Indonesian airline which operated charter flights. It was established in 2003.

== Fleet ==
=== Former fleet ===
The Nusantara Air Charter fleet consisted of the following aircraft (as of October 2019):

TransNusa Fleet
Aircraft	In Fleet	Orders	Passengers	Notes
ATR 42-500	1			
BAe 146	2	—		
Total	3			

== See also ==
TransNusa
