= Deaths in June 1991 =

The following is a list of notable deaths in June 1991.

Entries for each day are listed alphabetically by surname. A typical entry lists information in the following sequence:

- Name, age, country of citizenship at birth, subsequent country of citizenship (if applicable), reason for notability, cause of death (if known), and reference.

== June 1991 ==
=== 1 ===
- Charlie Brackins, 59, American football player (Green Bay Packers).
- Gordon Jackson, 67, Australian businessman.
- David Ruffin, 50, American singer (The Temptations), crack cocaine overdose.
- Árpád Soós, 78, Hungarian zoologist, entomologist and museologist.
- Toshio Usami, 83, Japanese Olympic field hockey player (1932).

=== 2 ===
- Ahmed Arif, 64, Turkish-Kurdish poet, heart attack.
- John Coughlan, 56, Australian politician.
- Per Frøistad, 79, Norwegian footballer.
- Hermann Jöckel, 70, German footballer.
- Richard Meikle, 61, Australian actor.
- Vincent Miceli, 76, American Catholic priest, theologian, and philosopher.
- Robert Russell Newton, 72, American physicist, astronomer, and historian of science.
- Joyce Treiman, 69, American painter.

=== 3 ===
- Margit Anna, 77, Hungarian painter.
- Jimmie Bennett, 71, American baseball player.
- Brian Bevan, 66, Australian rugby player.
- Vince Colletta, 67, American comic book artist (Fantastic Four, Thor, Wonder Woman).
- Raffaele Costantino, 83, Italian footballer.
- Harry Glicken, 33, American volcanologist, pyroclastic flow.
- Katia Krafft, 49, French volcanologist, pyroclastic flow.
- Maurice Krafft, 45, French volcanologist, pyroclastic flow.
- Dinesh Goswami, 56, Indian politician.
- Osmo Kaila, 75, Finnish chess master.
- Eva Le Gallienne, 92, English-American actress.
- Andy Milligan, 62, American playwright, AIDS.
- Takeshi Nagata, 77, Japanese geophysicist.

=== 4 ===
- Pentti Elo, 61, Finnish Olympic field hockey player (1952).
- Adriaan Katte, 90, Dutch Olympic field hockey player (1928).
- John Potter, 81, American Olympic fencer (1936).
- Franz Schafranek, 61, Austrian theatre director.
- MC Trouble, 20, American rap artist, heart failure.
- Rudolf Vogel, 85, German politician and member of the Bundestag.

=== 5 ===
- Rosalina Abejo, 68, Filipino composer.
- Evelyn Boucher, 99, British film actress.
- Min Chueh Chang, 82, Chinese-American biologist.
- Carl-Erik Holmberg, 84, Swedish football player.
- Ho Jong-suk, 88, Korean communist revolutionist, atheist, activist, journalist, and writer.
- Barry Kelley, 82, American actor (Oklahoma!, The Manchurian Candidate, The Asphalt Jungle).
- Larry Kert, 60, American actor (West Side Story), AIDS-related complications.
- Grete Kunz, 82, Czech painter.
- Jacques Mitterrand, 82, French politician and Grand Master.
- Sylvia Porter, 77, American economist, journalist and author.
- Lennart Sandin, 71, Swedish Olympic bobsledder (1952).
- Luis Suárez, 74, Cuban baseball player (Washington Senators).
- Arthur Trudeau, 88, American Army lieutenant general.

=== 6 ===
- Gianni De Luca, 64, Italian comic book artist and visual artist.
- Hernán Espinosa, 75, Spanish Olympic equestrian (1956, 1960).
- Stan Getz, 64, American saxophonist ("The Girl from Ipanema"), liver cancer.
- Carl Kaplanoff, 74, American football player.
- Adnan Süvari, 64-65, Turkish football coach, heart attack.
- Suzanne Thiollière, 66, French Olympic alpine skier (1948).
- Kurt Treu, 62, German classical philologist.

=== 7 ===
- Tahir Allauddin Al-Qadri Al-Gillani, 58, Iraqi-Pakistani Sufi philosopher.
- Antoine Blondin, 69, French writer.
- Alfred Kornprobst, 50, German Olympic weightlifter (1964).
- Jack Lancien, 67, Canadian ice hockey player (New York Rangers).
- Sydney McMeekan, 66, British Olympic basketball player (1948).
- Haoui Montaug, 38-39, American nightclub bouncer and revue operator, suicide by overdose.

=== 8 ===
- Manuel Álvarez, 80, Mexican Olympic sprinter (1932).
- Mary Bacon, 43, American jockey and model, suicide.
- Iker Belausteguigoitía, 63, Mexican Olympic sailor (1964, 1968).
- Heidi Brühl, 49, German singer and actress, breast cancer.
- Pierrette Caillol, 92, French stage and film actress.
- Monroe D. Donsker, 66, American mathematician, cancer.
- Maurice Huet, 72, French Olympic fencer (1948).
- Bimal Krishna Matilal, 56, British-Indian philosopher.
- Saim Polatkan, 83, Turkish Olympic equestrian (1936).
- Bertice Reading, 57, American-English actress, stroke.
- David Allan Young, 76, American entomologist.
- Wilhelm Szewczyk, 75, Polish writer, poet, communist activist, and politician.

=== 9 ===
- Claudio Arrau, 88, Chilean pianist, complications from surgery.
- Joe Hamilton, 62, American television producer and actor, cancer.
- Howard Hobson, 87, American basketball player and coach.
- Erkki Järvinen, 86, Finnish Olympic triple jumper (1928).
- J. Raymond Jones, 91, American politician.
- Raj Khosla, 66, Indian filmmaker.
- Charles Loloma, 70, American artist and jeweler.
- Gian Carlo Ronchetti, 77, Italian Olympic bobsledder (1948).

=== 10 ===
- Jean Bruller, 89, French novelist.
- Jim Burrows, 86, New Zealand rugby player and soldier.
- Tormod Mobraaten, 81, Norwegian-Canadian Olympic skier (1936, 1948).
- Irvine Page, 90, American physiologist.
- Jack Purcell, 87, Canadian world champion badminton player.
- Silvan Tomkins, 80, American psychologist.

=== 11 ===
- David Croll, 91, Canadian politician.
- Cromwell Everson, 65, South African composer.
- George Henry Guilfoyle, 77, American prelate of the Roman Catholic Church.
- Friedl Hardt, 72, German actress.
- Goldie Holt, 89, American baseball player, scout, coach and manager.
- Alf Hurley, 78, Australian rules footballer.
- Bert Reisfeld, 84, Austrian lyricist.
- Carl Ring, 89, American Olympic hurdler (1928).
- Alvin Benjamin Rubin, 71, American judge.
- Moe Spahn, 79, American basketball player, heart failure.
- Wolfgang Stegmüller, 68, German-Austrian philosopher.
- John Vallier, 70, English pianist, lung cancer.
- Michael Wall, 44, British playwright.

=== 12 ===
- Iwao Ageishi, 83, Japanese Olympic skier (1932).
- Alexander Baring, 6th Baron Ashburton, 93, British businessman and politician.
- Reg Hamilton, 77, Canadian ice hockey player (Toronto Maple Leafs, Chicago Black Hawks), and coach.
- Branko Hofman, 61, Slovene poet, writer and playwright.
- Alfred Pasquali, 92, French actor and theatre director.
- Eric Smith, 56, Scottish football player.

=== 13 ===
- Ubaldesco Baldi, 46, Italian sport shooter and Olympic medalist (1976).
- Willy Bernath, 77, Swiss Olympic cross-country skier (1936).
- Karl Bielig, 92, German politician and member of the Bundestag.
- Edward Blood, 82, American Olympic skier (1932, 1936).
- Loulou Boulaz, 83, Swiss mountain climber and alpine skier.
- Gearóid Ó Cuinneagáin, 81, Irish language activist, nationalist and far-right politician.
- John Jordan, 81, American basketball player and coach.
- Marek Kuczma, 55, Polish mathematician.
- John Schmitt, 89, American Olympic rower (1928).

=== 14 ===
- Dame Peggy Ashcroft, 83, English actress (A Passage to India ,The Nun's Story, Three into Two Won't Go), stroke.
- Shiro Kasamatsu, 93, Japanese artist.
- Lozan Kotsev, 80, Bulgarian football manager.
- Bernard Miles, 83, English actor.
- Vladimir Mikhaylovich Petrov, 84, Soviet diplomat and defector.
- John Pilch, 65, American basketball player (Minneapolis Lakers).
- Frank Valentino, 84, American operatic baritone.

=== 15 ===
- Abdullah Mubarak Al-Sabah, 76, Kuwaiti royal.
- Happy Chandler, 92, American politician and baseball official, heart attack.
- Wacław Król, 75, Polish Air Force pilot and officer.
- Sir Arthur Lewis, 76, Saint Lucian economist, Nobel Prize recipient (1979).
- Virgil Rayburn, 80, American gridiron football player.
- Les Selvage, 48, American basketball player.

=== 16 ===
- Vicki Brown, 50, English singer, breast cancer.
- Bruce Cummings, 64, Canadian football player, heart attack.
- Lanny Harris, 51, American baseball umpire.
- Emmanuel Laroche, 76, French linguist.
- Leslie Mahaffy, 14, Canadian murder victim.
- Adina Mandlová, 81, Czech film and stage actress, tuberculosis.

=== 17 ===
- Mehmet Aziz, 97, Turkish Cypriot medical doctor.
- Harry Darbyshire, 59, English footballer.
- Pierre Jamet, 98, French harpist.
- Beatrice Pons, 85, American actress.

=== 18 ===
- Ronald Allen, 60, British actor (Crossroads, A Night to Remember, Doctor Who), cancer.
- Vivion Brewer, 90, American desegregationist.
- Joan Caulfield, 69, American actress, cancer.
- Bill Douglas, 57, Scottish film director.
- Leonida Frascarelli, 85, Italian racing cyclist.
- Eric Halstead, 79, New Zealand politician.

=== 19 ===
- Jean Arthur, 90, American actress (The More the Merrier, Mr. Smith Goes to Washington, Only Angels Have Wings), heart failure.
- Larry Bogart, 77, American anti–nuclear power activist, traffic accident.
- Åke Dahlqvist, 90, Swedish cinematographer.
- Antonio del Amo, 79, Spanish screenwriter and film director, traffic collision.
- Oskar Fredriksen, 82, Norwegian cross-country skier.
- Pete Rambo, 84, American baseball player (Philadelphia Phillies).

=== 20 ===
- Kitty ter Braake, 77, Dutch Olympic sprinter (1936).
- Roy Fournier, 69, Canadian politician.
- Malcolm Frager, 56, American pianist.
- Bill Giaver, 94, American football player.
- Max Lüthi, 82, Swiss literary theorist.
- Jock Nelson, 83, Australian politician.
- Gerald Priestland, 64, British broadcaster.
- Frank Umont, 73, American baseball umpire.
- Michael Westphal, 26, German tennis player, AIDS-related complications.
- Isaac Wolfson, 93, Scottish businessman and philanthropist.

=== 21 ===
- Julio Gallardo, 49, Chilean football player.
- Jackie Hunt, 71, American gridiron football player (Chicago Bears).
- Ivor Salter, 65, English actor.
- Klaus Schwarzkopf, 68, German actor, AIDS.
- Rudra Mohammad Shahidullah, 34, Bangladeshi poet, drug abuse and depression.
- Toshihiro Shimamura, 79, Japanese Go player.
- Harry Wilke, 90, American baseball player (Chicago Cubs).

=== 22 ===
- Luigi Infantino, 70, Italian operatic tenor.
- Kevin O'Connor, 56, American actor.
- Marv Owen, 85, American baseball player, manager, coach and scout.
- Herbert Sohler, 82, German U-boat commander during World War II.

=== 23 ===
- Cyril Aldred, 77, English historian.
- Basdeo Bissoondoyal, 85, Mauritian educator and activist.
- António Jacinto, 66, Angolan poet and politician.
- Piero Lulli, 68, Italian film actor.
- Lea Padovani, 70, Italian film actress.
- Michael Pfleghar, 58, German film director and screenwriter, suicide.
- Masayuki Takayanagi, 58, Japanese jazz musician.

=== 24 ===
- Czesław Białas, 60, Polish Olympic weightlifter (1952, 1956, 1960).
- Sumner Locke Elliott, 73, Australian-American novelist and playwright.
- James Fawcett, 78, British barrister.
- Nitty Gritty, 34, Jamaican reggae singer, shot.
- Franz Hengsbach, 80, German Catholic cardinal and bishop.
- Hector Moir, 81, Australian rules footballer.
- Philip Rastelli, 73, American mobster and boss of the Bonanno crime family, liver cancer.
- Bud Swartz, 62, American baseball player (St. Louis Browns).
- Rufino Tamayo, 91, Mexican painter, heart attack.

=== 25 ===
- Colin Atkinson, 59, English cricket player and schoolmaster.
- Hans Bernlöhr, 83, German Olympic boxer (1932).
- Michael Heidelberger, 103, American immunologist.
- Tauno Lindgren, 79, Finnish Olympic cyclist (1936)
- Orlando Madrigal, 70, Costa Rican Olympic judoka (1964).

=== 26 ===
- Vlasta Fabianová, 78, Czech film actress.
- Kunibert Gensichen, 84, German actor.
- Domina Jalbert, 86, American aviator .
- Johnny Johnson, 76, American baseball player (New York Yankees, Chicago White Sox).
- Jack A. Marta, 88, American cinematographer.
- Mike Masaoka, 76, Japanese-American lobbyist, author, and spokesman.
- Fred Reid, 81, British Olympic sprinter (1932).
- Iwa Wanja, 85, Bulgarian-German actress.
- Öllegård Wellton, 59, Swedish actress.
- Wolfgang Zilzer, 90, German actor.

=== 27 ===
- Juan Brigo, 62-63, Argentine Olympic field hockey player (1948).
- Klaas Bruinsma, 37, Dutch drug lord, shot.
- Molly Geertsema, 72, Dutch politician and jurist.
- Klemens Großimlinghaus, 49, German cyclist.
- Charlie Humber, 77, American baseball player.
- Cynthia Longfield, 95, Anglo-Irish entomologist and explorer.
- George MacLeod, 96, Scottish presbyterian clergyman and soldier.
- Milton Subotsky, 69, American screenwriter and producer.

=== 28 ===
- Arnold Kieffer, 80, Luxembourgish Olympic footballer (1936).
- Ernie McCormick, 85, Australian cricket player.
- Hans Nüsslein, 81, German tennis player.
- Nikolas Vogel, 24, Austrian actor and journalist, missile strike.
- Philip Weaver, 78, English cricketer and British Army officer.
- Norbert Werner, 23, Austrian journalist and war correspondent, missile strike.

=== 29 ===
- Sheree Beasley, 6, Australian murder victim.
- Jim Connock, 66, English film editor.
- Russ Hinze, 72, Australian politician.
- Richard Holmes, 60, American organist, heart attack.
- Henri Lefebvre, 90, French sociologist.
- Marko Mandič, 51, Yugoslavian rower and Olympian (1964, 1972).
- Carl Nielsen, 61, Danish Olympic rower (1952).
- Enrique Cahen Salaberry, 79, Argentine film director.
- Valerijonas Šadreika, 53, Lithuanian politician.

=== 30 ===
- Berndt Carlsson, 84, Swedish Olympic cyclist (1936).
- John B. Goodman, 89, American art director.
- John Grier, 90, American Olympic sports shooter (1924).
- Tamara Khanum, 85, Soviet dancer.
- Pamela Stanley, 81, British actress.
- Hisao Tanaka, 70, American professional wrestler.
