= Grete Kunz =

Grete Kunz can refer to:

- Grete Kunz (fencer) (born 1908), Austrian fencer
- Grete Kunz (painter) (1909–1991), Czech painter
