= ATR (aircraft manufacturer) =

Franco-Italian Aircraft manufacturer

Avions de Transport Régional GIE
- Trade name: ATR
- Native name: Avions de Transport Régional (French); Aerei da Trasporto Regionale (Italian)
- Type: Joint venture
- Traded as: ATR
- Industry: Aerospace
- Founded: 1981; 45 years ago
- Headquarters: Toulouse Blagnac International Airport, Blagnac, France
- Key people: Nathalie Tarnaud Laude (CEO)
- Products: ATR 42, ATR 72, ATR 72-600F
- Revenue: ▲US$1.2 billion (2025)
- Number of employees: >1,300 (2017)
- Parent: Airbus (50%); Leonardo (50%)
- Website: www.atr-aircraft.com

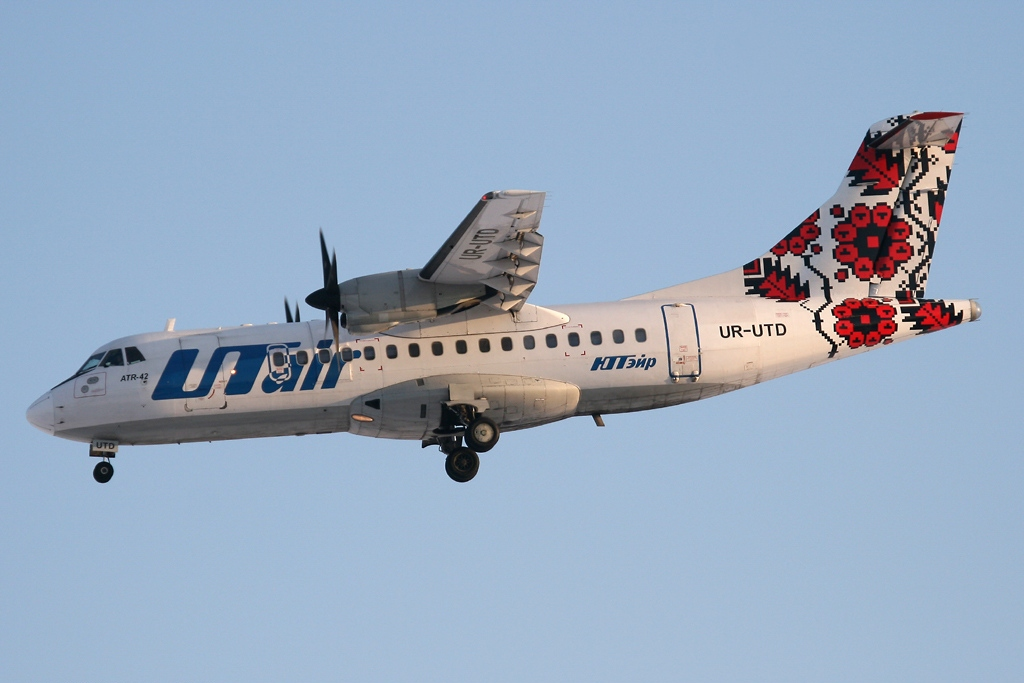
ATR 42, 22.67 m long

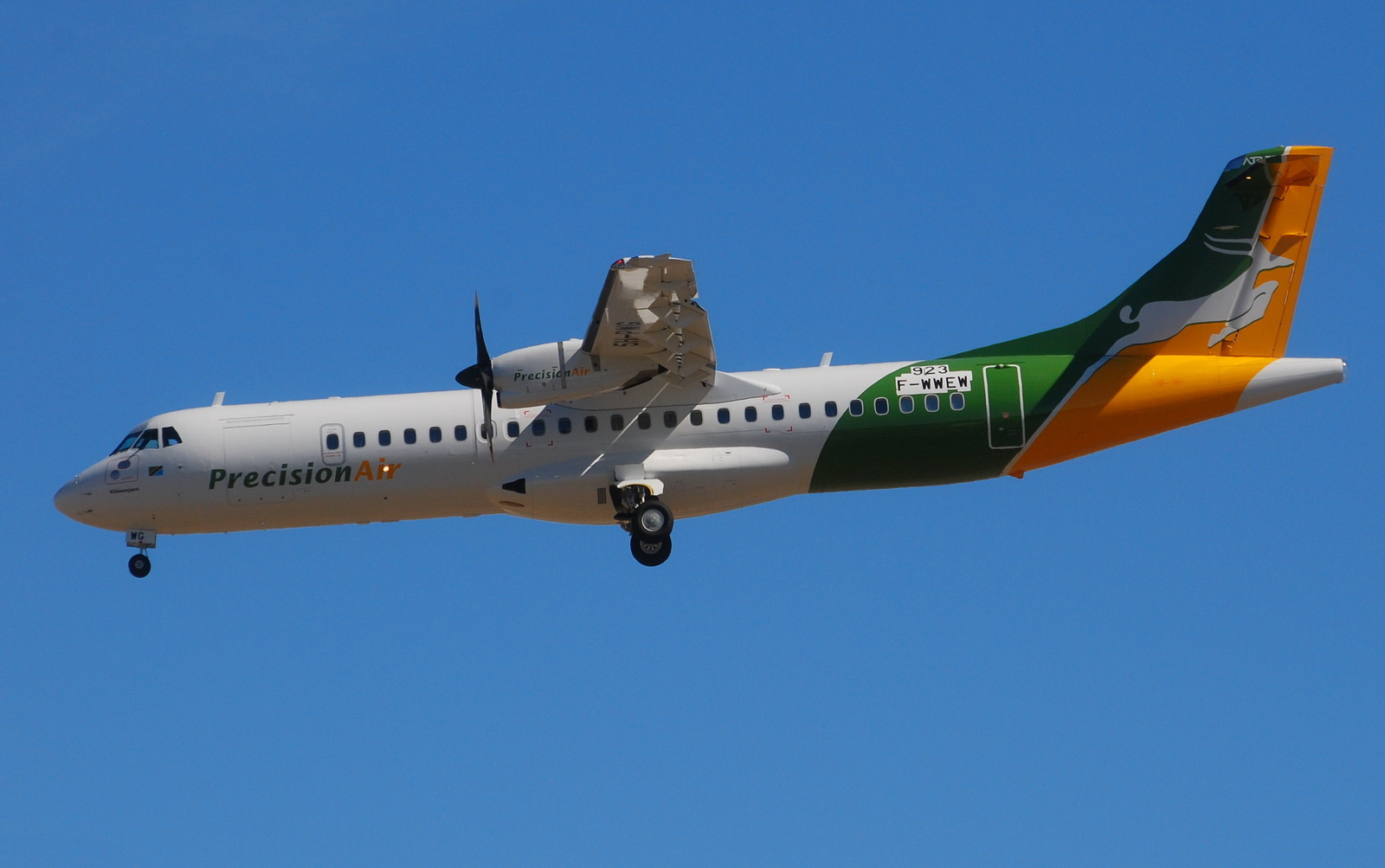
ATR 72, 27.17 m long

ATR (French: Avions de Transport Régional, Italian: Aerei da Trasporto Regionale, lit. 'Regional Transport Airplanes') is a Franco-Italian aircraft manufacturer headquartered in Blagnac, France, a suburb of Toulouse. The company was founded in 1981 as a joint venture (known as an Economic Interest Group or GIE under French law) between Aérospatiale of France (now Airbus) and Aeritalia (now Leonardo) of Italy. Its main products are the ATR 42 and ATR 72 aircraft. ATR has sold more than 1,700 aircraft and has over 200 operators in more than 100 countries.

== Manufacturing ==
Leonardo's manufacturing facilities in Pomigliano d'Arco, near Naples, Italy, produce the aircraft's fuselage and tail sections. Aircraft wings are assembled at Sogerma in Bordeaux in western France by Airbus France. Final assembly, flight-testing, certification and deliveries are the responsibility of ATR in Toulouse, France.

== History ==
=== 1980s ===
During the 1960s and 1970s, European aircraft manufacturers had, for the most part, undergone considerable corporate restructuring, including mergers and consolidations, as well as moved towards collaborative multi-national programmes, such as the newly launched Airbus A300. In line with this trend towards intra-European cooperation, French aerospace company Aérospatiale and Italian aviation conglomerate Aeritalia commenced discussions on the topic of working together to develop an all-new regional airliner. Prior to this, both companies had been independently conducting studies for their own aircraft concepts, the AS 35 design in the case of Aerospatiale and the AIT 230 for Aeritalia, to conform with demand within this sector of the market as early as 1978.

On 4 November 1981, a formal Cooperation Agreement was signed by Aeritalia chairman Renato Bonifacio and Aérospatiale chairman Jacques Mitterrand in Paris, France. This agreement signaled not only the merger of their efforts but of their separate concept designs together into a single complete aircraft design for the purpose of pursuing its development and manufacture as a collaborative joint venture. The consortium targeted a similar unit cost but a 950 lb (430 kg) fuel consumption over a 200 nmi (370 km) sector, nearly half the 1,750 lb (790 kg) required by its 40-50 seat competitors, the British Aerospace HS.748 and Fokker F.27, and planned a 58-seat ATR XX stretch.

This agreement served not only as the basis and origins of the ATR company, but also as the effective launch point of what would become the fledgling firm's first aircraft, which was designated as the ATR 42. By 1983, ATR's customer services division has been set up, readying infrastructure worldwide to provide support for ATR's upcoming aircraft to any customer regardless of location.

On 16 August 1984, the first model of the type, known as the ATR 42–200, conducted its maiden flight from Toulouse Airport, France. During September 1985, both the French Directorate General for Civil Aviation (DGCA) and the Italian Italian Civil Aviation Authority awarded type certification for the type, clearing it to commence operational service. On 3 December 1985, the first production aircraft, designated as the ATR 42-300, was delivered to French launch customer Air Littoral; the first revenue service was performed later that same month. During January 1986, already confident of the ATR 42's success and of the demand for an enlarged version of the aircraft, ATR announced that the launch of a programme to develop such an aircraft, which was designated as the ATR 72 to reflect its increased passenger capacity.

During 1988, the 200th ATR was delivered to Thai Airways. During September 1989, it was announced that ATR had achieved its original target of 400 sales of the ATR. That same year, deliveries of the enlarged ATR 72 commenced; shortly thereafter, it became common for both types to be ordered together. Since the smaller ATR 42 is assembled on the same production line as the ATR 72, along with sharing the majority of subsystems, components, and manufacturing techniques, the two types support each other to remain in production. This factor may have been crucial as, by 2015, the ATR 42 was the only 50-seat regional aircraft that was still being manufactured.

=== 1990s ===
During September 1992, the 300th ATR was delivered to Finnish airline Karair. The 500th ATR was delivered to American Eagle, USA, on 5 September 1997.

In order to maintain a technological edge on the highly competitive market for regional airliners during the 1990s, several modifications and improved versions of the ATR 42 were progressively introduced. The initial ATR 42-300 model remained in production until 1996, while the first upgraded (and broadly similar) model, designated as the ATR 42-320, was also produced until 1996. The -320 variant principally differed in that it was powered by a pair of the more-powerful PW121 engines, giving it improved performance over the 300. Another variant, the ATR 42-300QC, was a dedicated 'quick-change' (convertible) freight/passenger version of the standard −300 series.

The next major production version was the ATR 42−500 series, the development of which was originally announced on 14 June 1993. Performing its maiden flight on 16 September 1994, and awarded certification by the British Civil Aviation Authority and France's (DGCA) during July 1995; the -500 model was an upgraded aircraft, equipped with new PW127 engines, new six-bladed propellers, improved hot and high performance, increased weight capacity and an improved passenger cabin. On 31 October 1995, the first ATR 42-500 was delivered to Italian operator Air Dolomiti; on 19 January 1996, the first revenue service to be performed by the type was conducted. In addition to new aircraft models, various organisational changes were also implemented. On 10 July 1998, ATR launched its new Asset Management Department.

=== 2000s ===
On 28 April 2000, the 600th ATR, an ATR 72-500, was delivered to Italian operator Air Dolomiti. The 700th aircraft, an ATR 72-500, was delivered to Indian airline Simplify Deccan, on 8 September 2006.

In June 2001, EADS and Alenia Aeronautica, ATR's parent companies, decided to reinforce their partnership, regrouping all industrial activities related to regional airliners underneath the ATR consortium. On 3 October 2003, ATR became one of the first aircraft manufacturers to be certified under ISO 9001-2000 and EN/AS/JISQ 9100, the worldwide quality standard for the aeronautics industry. During July 2004, ATR and Brazilian aircraft manufacturer Embraer announced a cooperation agreement on the AEROChain Portal for the purpose of delivering improved customer service. During April 2009, ATR announces the launch of its 'Door-2-Door' service as a new option in its comprehensive customer services range.

On 2 October 2007, ATR CEO Stéphane Mayer announced the launch of the −600 series aircraft; the ATR 42–600 and ATR 72–600 featured various improvements to increase efficiency, dispatch reliability, lower fuel burn and operating costs. While broadly similar to the earlier -500 model, differences include the adoption of improved PW127M engines, a new glass cockpit, and a variety of other minor improvements. Using the test registration F-WWLY, the prototype ATR 42–600 first flew on 4 March 2010.

=== 2010s ===
The 900th aircraft, an ATR 72-500, was delivered to Brazilian airline TRIP Linhas Aéreas on 10 September 2010. During 2011, Royal Air Maroc took delivery of the first ATR 72-600. The 1,000th aircraft was delivered to Spain's Air Nostrum on May 3, 2012. On 15 June 2015, Japan Air Commuter signed a contract for ATR's 1,500th aircraft.

On 1 February 2016, ATR signed a major agreement with Iran Air for 40 ATR 72-600s. The 1,300th ATR, an ATR 72-600, was delivered to NAC for operation by Irish airline Stobart Air on 14 June 2016; that same year, ATR delivered the first ever ATR 72-600 High Capacity aircraft (78 seats) to Cebu Pacific. In October 2016, Christian Scherer was appointed CEO.

In 2017, ATR celebrated its 35th anniversary. On 1 February, ATR and Sweden's BRA performed the first ATR biofuel flight. During August 2017, US regional carrier Silver Airways signed a letter of intent for up to 50 ATR 42, a return to the continental US market since 1997 when American Airlines converted 12 ATR 72 options, due to the rise of regional jets and the American Eagle Flight 4184 crash in 1994. ATR lowered its output to 80 deliveries a year from 2017 and boasts a nearly three-year backlog after FedEx Express' November 2017 order. In 2017, ATR booked 113 firm orders and 40 options, and delivered 80 aircraft: 70 new ATR 72-600s, 8 new ATR 42-600s and 2 second hand ATRs.

By April 2018, the fleet was flying more than 5,000 times per day and had operated 30 million flight hours. By the end of June 2018, Leonardo had shipped the 1,500th ATR fuselage while nearly 1,700 airliners had been ordered; ATR reportedly led the turboprop regional airliner market since 2010 with a 75% share. The company's aircraft were being operated in nearly 100 countries by 200 airlines and 30 million flights had been completed; it was also claimed that an ATR airliner takes off or lands every 8 seconds.

On 13 September, Scherer left its CEO role to replace Eric Schulz as Airbus' Chief Commercial Officer. ATR replaced Scherer as its chief executive with Stefano Bortoli, president of ATR's board and Leonardo aircraft's senior vice-president for strategy and marketing. At the end of October, the 1,500th ATR was delivered, an ATR 72-600 to Japan Air Commuter, after nearly 500 ATR 42s and more than 1,000 ATR 72s deliveries to over 200 operators in 100 countries. During 2018, ATR delivered 76 aircraft; the rate of production has held at a stable rate. The company opted to pursue a low-risk strategy, avoiding disruptive measures while opting to integrate relatively straightforward enhancements onto its aircraft, such as the Elbit Systems ClearVision wearable enhanced vision system.

Previous ATR logo

=== 2020s ===
In May 2022, ATR started studying an Evo hybrid-electric variant, aiming for a 2023 launch and service entry before 2030. An optimized turboprop running on SAF would be supplemented by a mild hybridization during the take-off and climb phases for a 20% lower fuel burn. Other improvements could include an eight-bladed propeller, thermal de-icing to replace the current pneumatic boots, a single lever FADEC for both engine and propeller and an aerodynamic clean-up of the secondary structures like the nacelle-wing junction. A cabin revamp would save weight with recycled carbonfibre or bio-sourced resin and natural fibres.

On September 17, 2022, Stefano Bortoli was succeeded as CEO of ATR by Nathalie Tarnaud Laude, former president of NHIndustries and Senior Vice President Head of the NH90 Programme for Airbus Helicopters. On 21 June 2022, ATR completed its first flight as a 100% SAF-powered regional aircraft.

On November 13, 2024, ATR declared that it would scrap its development of a new model designed to take off and land on short runways and instead concentrate instead on its existing portfolio. This project was undertaken in 2019, where it announced its plans to develop a unique version of its smallest model to squeeze in and out of airports with runways as short as 800 metres (2,600 feet).

On 26 March 2026, reports indicated that Airbus is in talks with stakeholders to establish a Final Assembly Line (FAL) for the ATR regional aircraft in India. The aerospace major is evaluating a feasibility for a business case. In September 2026, ATR announced the appointment of Vittorio Lorenzo Della Bella as Chief Executive Officer, effective November 1, succeeding Nathalie Tarnaud Laude.

== Products ==
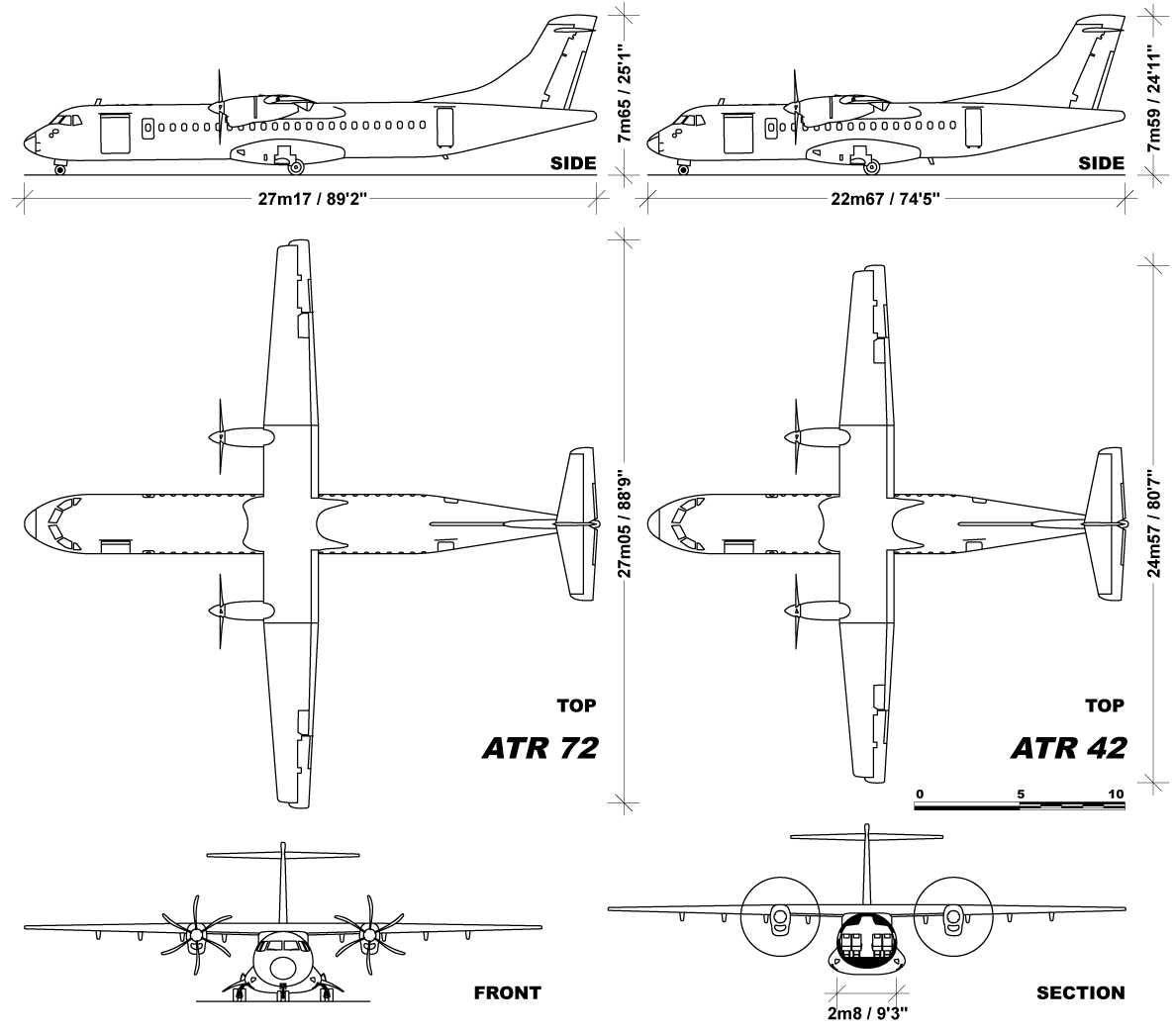

ATR family booklet
	ATR 42-600	ATR 72-600
Flight crew	2	
Seating	48	70
Length	22.67 m (74 ft 5 in)	27.166 m (89 ft 1.5 in)
Wingspan	24.57 m (80 ft 7 in)	27.05 m (88 ft 9 in)
Height	7.59 m (24 ft 11 in)	7.65 m (25 ft 1 in)
Wing area	54.5 m^{2} (587 sq ft)	61 m^{2} (660 sq ft)
Aspect ratio	11.1	12
Typical empty	11,700 kg (25,800 lb)	13,500 kg (29,800 lb)
MTOW	18,600 kg (41,000 lb)	23,000 kg (51,000 lb)
Max. payload	5,300 kg (11,700 lb)	7,500 kg (16,500 lb)
Fuel capacity	4,500 kg (9,900 lb)	5,000 kg (11,000 lb)
Engines (×2)	Pratt & Whitney Canada PW127M	
Power	2,160 shp (1,611 kW)	2,475 shp (1,846 kW)
Cruise speed	300 kn (560 km/h)	275 kn (509 km/h)
Max. pax range	716 nmi (1,326 km)	825 nmi (1,528 km)

== Proposed aircraft ==
ATR 52
The ATR 52 was a 50-seat airliner proposed in parallel with the military ATR 52C
ATR 52C
The ATR 52C was a military variant of the ATR 72-100 that included a rear ramp-type cargo door and strengthened cabin floor.
ATR 82
Beginning in the mid-1980s, the company investigated an 86-seat derivative of the ATR 72. The ATR 82 would have been powered by turboprops, after an airline survey concluded that the market preferred turboprops instead of turbofans for aircraft that seated fewer than 90 passengers. The 5,000 hp (3,700 kW) powerplants would have been chosen from the Allison AE2100G, Textron Lycoming LP512, or the General Electric GLC38. The aircraft would have a cruising speed as high as 330 knots (610 km/h; 380 mph). The ATR-82 project (as it was dubbed) was suspended when Aero International (Regional) (AI(R)) was formed in early 1996.
ATR 92
The company proposed a five-to-six abreast, 95–105 seat airliner at the 1988 Farnborough Air Show. The aircraft would have cruised at 400 kn (740 km/h; 460 mph), and it would have been powered by a turbofan, high-speed turboprop, or an unducted fan.
ATR stretch
In 2007, as a response to the Q400X proposal, ATR floated the idea of a 90–99 seater stretch. As of 2009, it was considered part of the future -900 series ATR family. In 2011, the 90-seater was proposed to shareholders. As of 2012, a new clean-sheet design was considered in the 90-seat segment, for a 2017 launch.

ATR of Air Astra

As of 2017, development of a 90-seater for an expected demand of 2,000–2,500 units over 20 years was expected to cost more than $5bn. Fuel burn would need to be reduced by at least 30%, and the unit price would need to stay in the low-to-mid-$20m range, below small jets. Leonardo preferred a clean-sheet 90-100 seater with new turboprops, wings and cockpit available soon but Airbus favoured a medium-term introduction with disruptive hybrid electric engines, structural advanced materials and automation. In January 2018, Leonardo abandoned the 100-seater prospect, favouring existing ATR 42 and 72 models which dominate the turboprop market with a 75% share.
