= ATR 72 =

Regional turboprop airliner

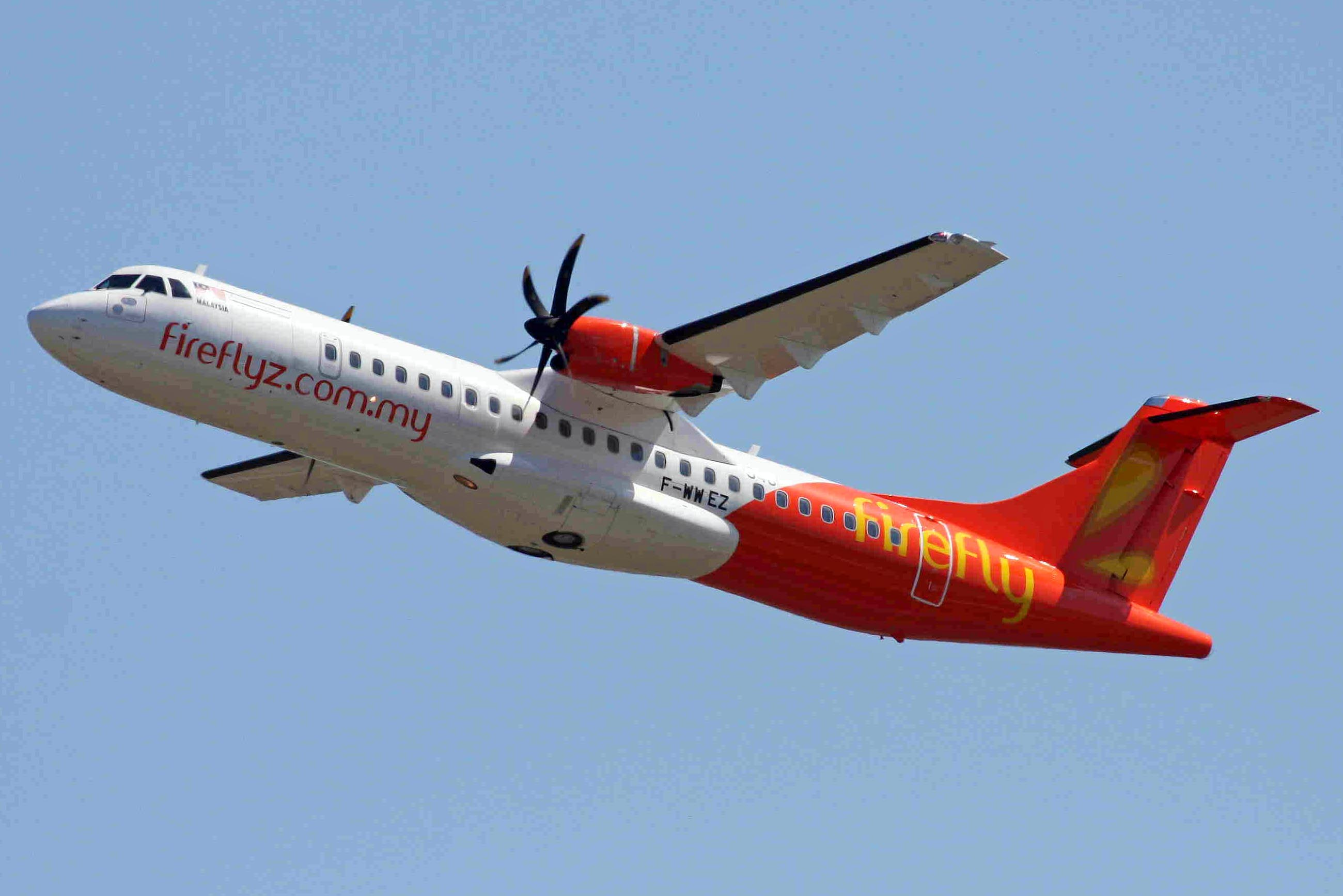
- An ATR 72 belonging to Firefly

General information
- Type: Turboprop regional airliner
- National origin: France/Italy
- Manufacturer: ATR
- Status: In service, in production
- Primary users: Wings Air IndiGo; Azul Brazilian Airlines; Air New Zealand
- Number built: 1,233

History
- Manufactured: 1988–present
- Introduction date: 27 October 1989 (Finnair)
- First flight: 27 October 1988
- Developed from: ATR 42
- Developed into: ATR 52 (not built)

The ATR 72 is a twin-engine turboprop, short-haul regional airliner developed and produced in France and Italy by aircraft manufacturer ATR. The number "72" in its name is derived from the aircraft's typical standard seating capacity of 72 passengers. The ATR 72 has also been used as a corporate transport, cargo aircraft, and maritime patrol aircraft.

To date, all of the ATR series have been completed at the company's final assembly line in Toulouse, France; ATR benefits from sharing resources and technology with Airbus SE, which has continued to hold a 50% interest in the company. Successive models of the ATR 72 have been developed. Typical updates have included new avionics, such as a glass cockpit, and the adoption of newer engine versions to deliver enhanced performance, such as increased efficiency and reliability and reductions in operating costs. The aircraft shares a high degree of commonality with the smaller ATR 42, which remains in production as of 2026.

== History ==
ATR (French: Avions de transport régional or Italian: Aerei da Trasporto Regionale) is a joint venture formed by French aerospace company Aérospatiale (now part of Airbus) and Italian aviation conglomerate Aeritalia (now Leonardo S.p.A.). During the 1980s, French aerospace company Aérospatiale and Italian aviation conglomerate Aeritalia merged their work on a new generation of regional aircraft. The new jointly owned company, ATR, was established to develop, manufacture, and market their first airliner, later designated the ATR 42. On 16 August 1984, the first model of the series, designated as the ATR 42-300, performed the type's maiden flight. During the mid-1980s, the ATR 72 was developed as a stretched variant of the ATR 42. On 27 October 1989, Finnish airline Finnair became the first airline to operate this type in revenue service.

== Development ==
=== Origins ===
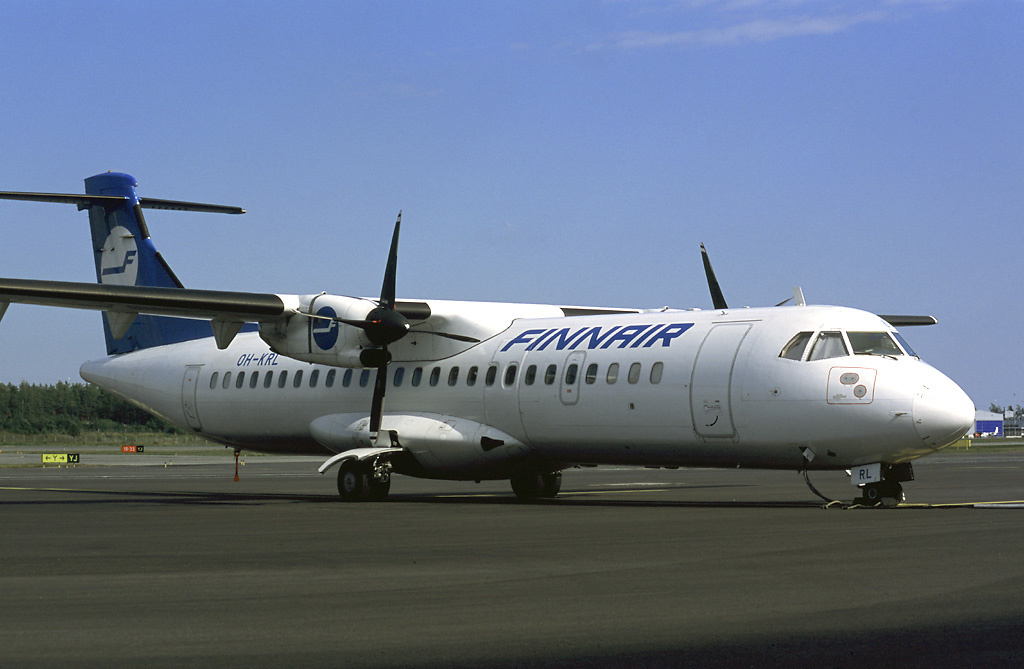
An ATR 72 of Finnair, its launch operator

During the mid-1980s, ATR sought to introduce a larger airliner with increased capacity over its earlier products. This new regional airliner, designated as the ATR 72, was directly developed from the earlier ATR 42 and had much in common with it; the principal difference between the two airliners was an increase in the maximum seating capacity from 48 to 78 passengers. This was principally achieved by stretching the fuselage by 4.5 m (15 ft), along with an increase of the wingspan, the use of more powerful engines, and increased fuel capacity by about 10%.

On 15 January 1986, the launch of the stretched ATR 72 programme was announced. On 27 October 1988, the prototype performed its maiden flight. One year later, on 25 September 1989, the ATR 72 received airworthiness certification from the French Directorate General for Civil Aviation. The following month, on 27 October 1989, Finnish airline Finnair became the first to introduce the aircraft into service. Since the ATR 72 is assembled on the same production line as the smaller ATR 42, along with sharing the majority of subsystems, components, and manufacturing techniques, the two types support each other to remain in production. This factor may have been crucial as, by 2015, the ATR 42 was the only 50-seat regional aircraft still being manufactured.

In 2000, the combined global ATR fleet reached its 10,000,000th flight, during which a distance of around 4 billion km (2.5 billion statute miles) and around 450 million passengers had flown on board ATR-built aircraft. The 2007 production set a new record for the programme's sales; a total of 113 new ATR aircraft had been ordered during a single year. By the end of 2014, ATR had received 1,000 orders for the type and delivered 754, leaving a backlog of 246 aircraft.

Various organisational changes were implemented within the ATR company. On 10 July 1998, ATR launched its new Asset Management Department. In June 2001, EADS and Alenia Aeronautica, ATR's parent companies, decided to reinforce their partnership, regrouping all industrial activities related to regional airliners into the ATR consortium. On 3 October 2003, ATR became one of the first aircraft manufacturers to be certified under ISO 9000-2000 and EN/AS/JISQ 9100, the worldwide quality standard for the aeronautics industry. During July 2004, ATR and Brazilian aircraft manufacturer Embraer announced a co-operation agreement on the AEROChain Portal to deliver improved customer service. During April 2009, ATR announced the launch of its 'Door-2-Door' service as a new option in its comprehensive customer services range. In 2017, the 72-600 unit cost was US$26 million.

=== Further development ===
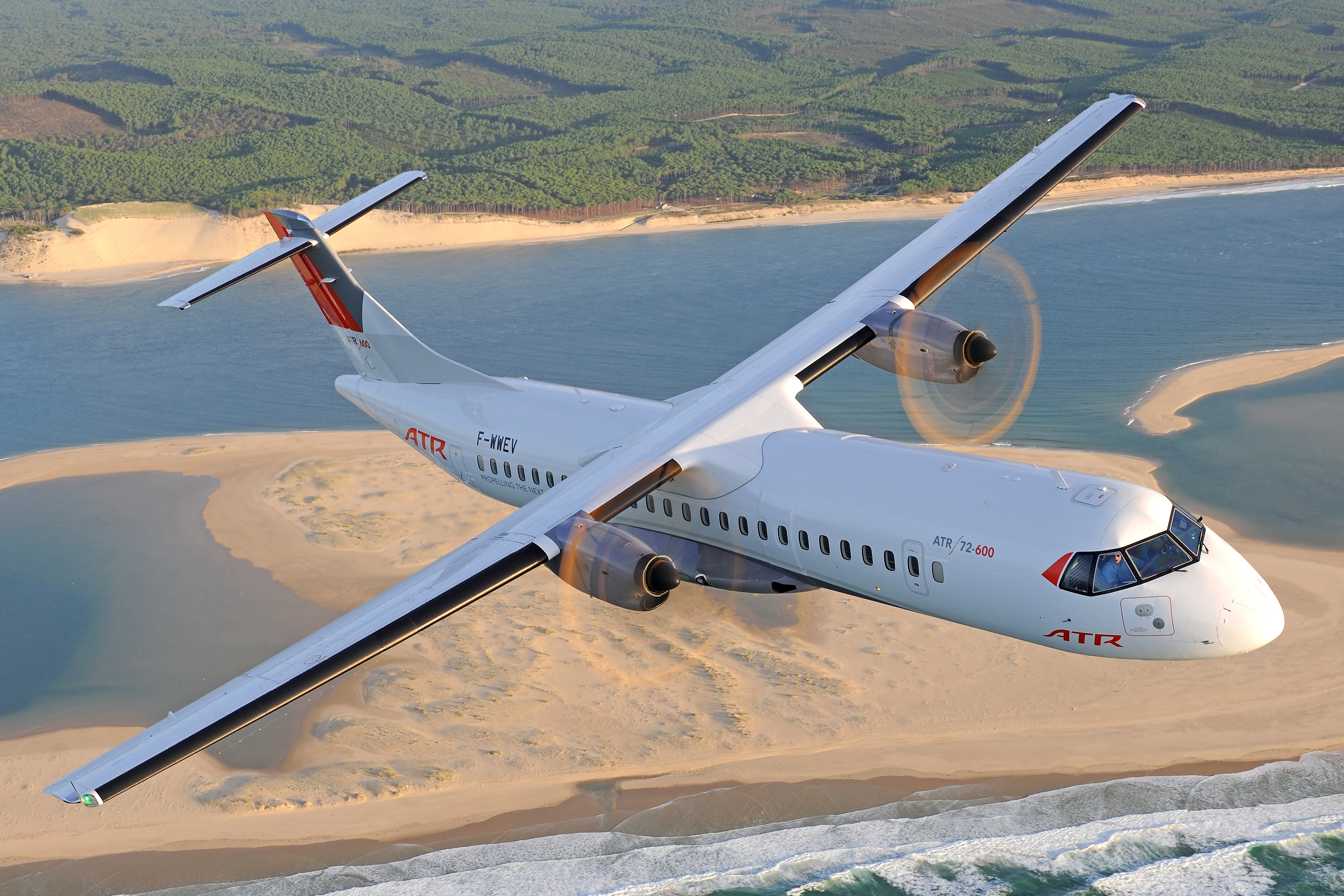
The ATR 72-600 was launched on 2 October 2007.

As of October 2007, the current production version is the ATR 72-600 series. On 2 October 2007, ATR CEO Stéphane Mayer announced the launch of the -600 series aircraft; the ATR 42-600 and ATR 72-600 featured various improvements to increase efficiency, dispatch reliability, lower fuel burn, and operating costs. While broadly similar to the earlier -500 model, differences include adopting improved PW127M engines, a new glass cockpit, and various other minor improvements.

Since 2008, ATR has been a participant in the European Clean Sky Joint Technology Initiative. On 8 July 2015, an ATR 72-600 'green' technology demonstrator performed its first flight; the demonstrator was used for testing new composite materials for insulation, air conditioning systems, electrical distribution systems, and energy dispersal modifications to evaluate their effect on the aircraft's overall efficiency as a contribution to the Clean Sky initiative. ATR's senior vice-president for engineering Alessandro Amendola indicated that the elimination of all uses of bleed air was a key aim in the designing of an all-electric architecture as well as improving engine efficiency; the minimising of peak electrical loads was also a stated priority. During March 2016, a second round of flight trials dedicated the testing of all-electric systems architecture using the demonstrator was completed; analysis is set to continue.

As a consequence of strong demand for the -600 series, ATR decided to invest in the establishment of a second, more modern final assembly line and acquisition of more hangar space at its Toulouse site, along with a new large completion and delivery area; overall, the manufacturing operation expanded to four times the footprint that it had in 2005. Speaking in October 2015, ATR CEO Patrick de Castelbajac stated that the firm was set to produce in excess of 90 aircraft that year, and that the new manufacturing facilities could support a production rate of up to 120 per year. At the time, the company had a backlog of orders for 300 aircraft, sufficient for three years of production. During 2017, a new in-house financing and leasing division was established by ATR in order to offer customers a greater degree of support and expand the company's range of services.

In December 2015, the EASA approved a new high-density seating layout, raising the maximum capacity from 74 to 78 seats. During the 2021 Dubai Airshow in mid-November 2021, ATR debuted the new ATR 72-600 powered by new PW127XT powerplants with 20% lower maintenance cost and 3% lower fuel consumption than the predecessor PW127M powerplant.

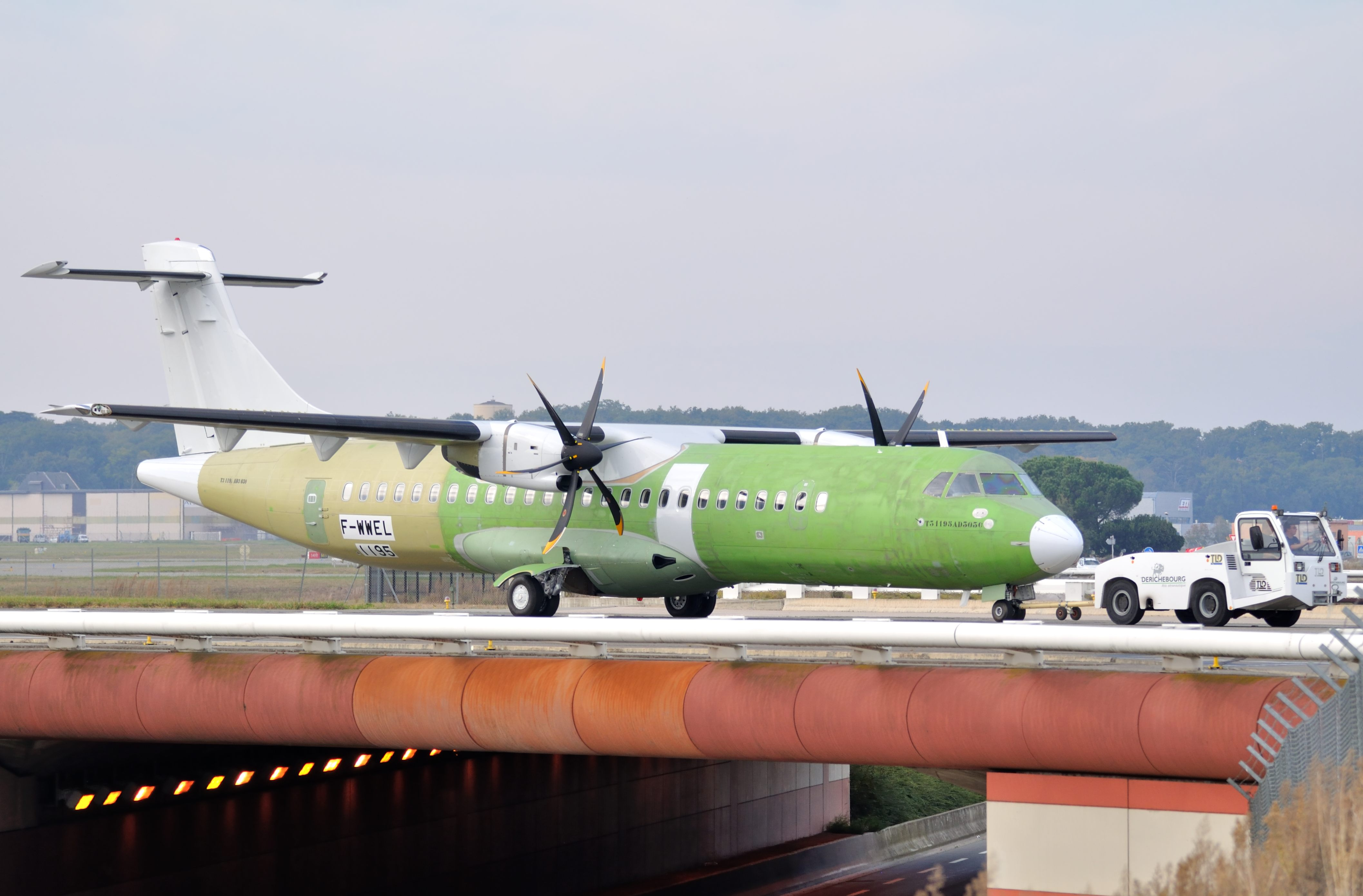
An ATR prior to painting at Toulouse

Considerable emphasis has been placed upon the continuous development of ATR's aircraft models. Speaking at the Farnborough Airshow in July 2016, the CEO of ATR Patrick de Castelbajac stated that the company was currently examining the possibility of replacing the current Pratt & Whitney Canada PW127 engine with either a new offer from P&WC, or a GE38 derivative from GE Aviation. Although expressing satisfaction with the PW127 engine and its supplier, Castelbajac noted the design's age and the need to remain competitive with the latest regional jets. To be a worthwhile exercise, any re-engine exercise would require a 15 per cent improvement in fuel-burn and 20-25 per cent reduction of direct maintenance costs. Additionally, Castelbajac sees the potential re-engine as a "bridge" to the eventual development of a larger 100-seat aircraft.

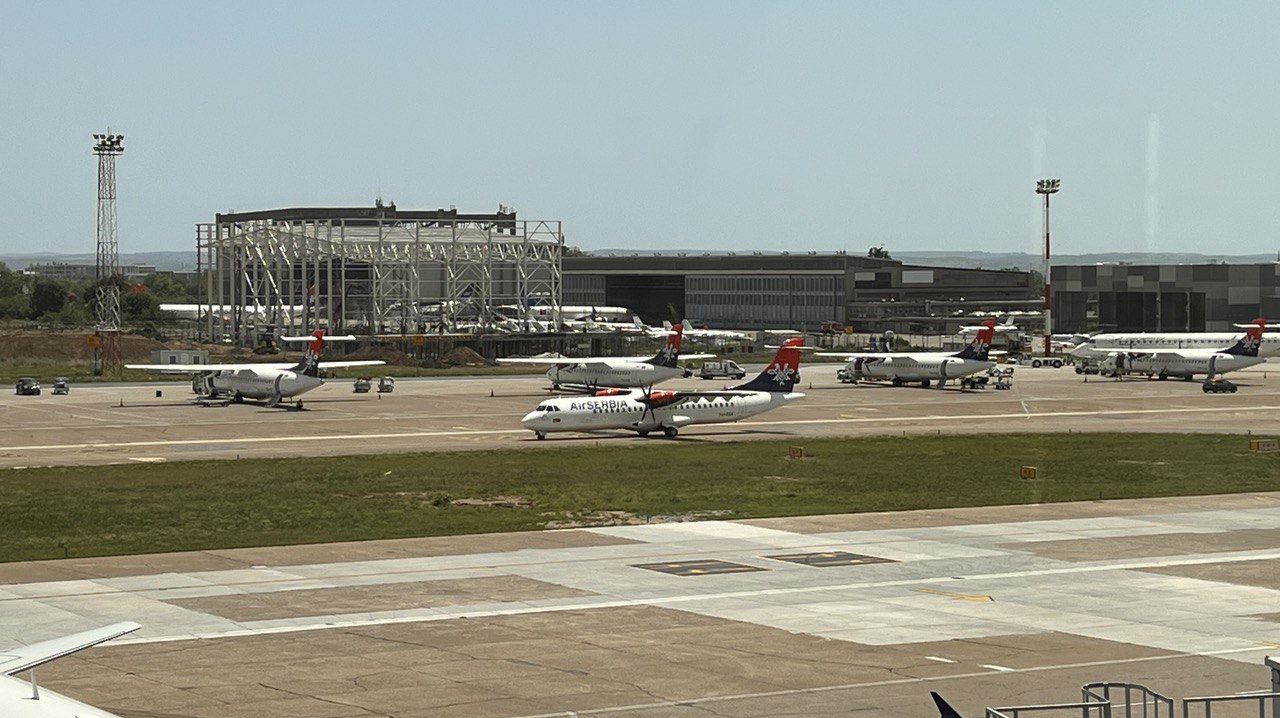
AirSerbia ATR 72-600 fleet

During the mid-2010s, reports emerged that the development of a further stretched 90-seat ATR model was under consideration as well; allegedly, shareholder Airbus was relatively unenthusiastic on proceeding with such a development, while Airbus CEO Fabrice Brégier favoured a focus on resolving manufacturing issues. However, in January 2018, ATR's parent company Leonardo announced that the 100-seat program has been formally brought to a close.

== Design ==
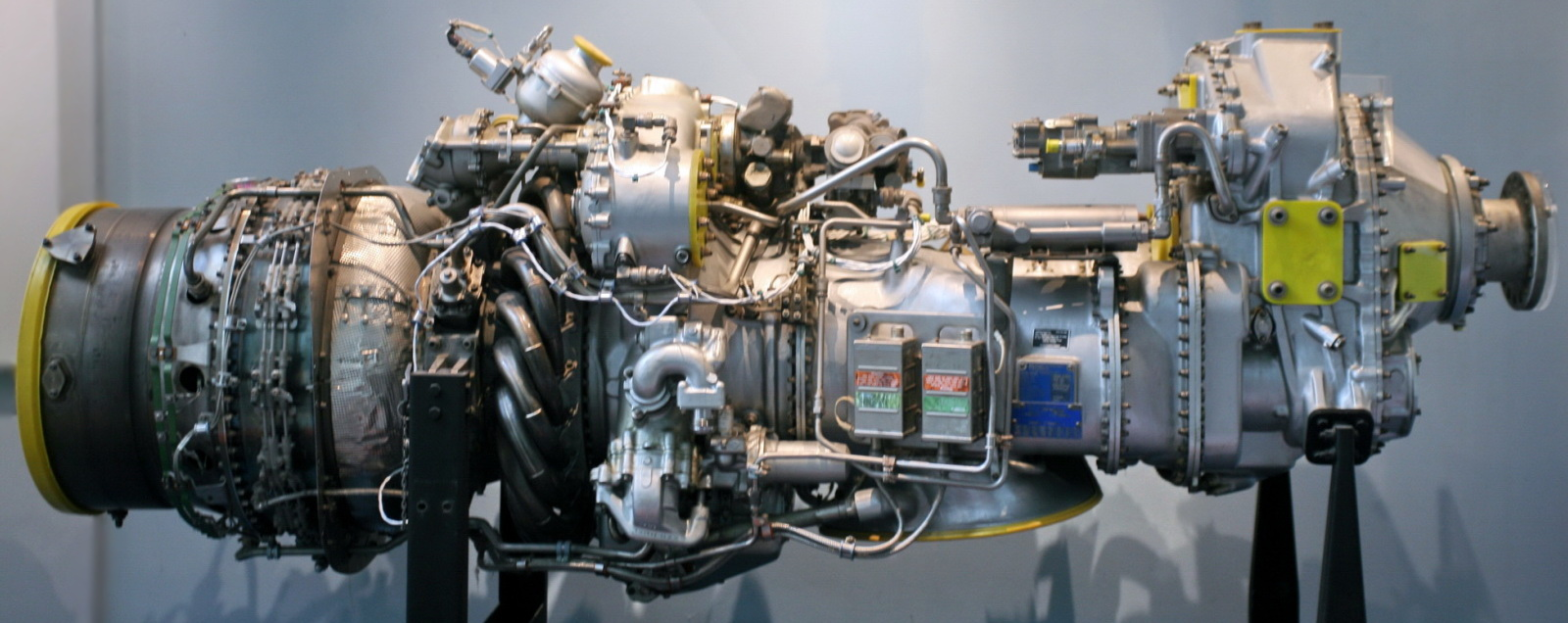
A Pratt & Whitney Canada PW100 series engine

The ATR 72 is a turboprop-powered regional airliner, capable of accommodating a maximum of 78 passengers. It is powered by a pair of Pratt & Whitney Canada PW100 turboprop engines, which drive an arrangement of four or six-bladed propellers supplied by Hamilton Standard. Earlier models of the ATR 72 are equipped with the older PW124B engine, rated at 1,800 kilowatts (2,400 shp), while later-built aircraft are powered by the newer PW127 engine, rated at a maximum of 2,050 kW (2,750 shp) to achieve improved "hot and high" takeoff performance. It can land and takeoff in high airports with short runways like Andorra Airport. It employs carbonfibres for 30% of the wing by weight, for a 20% weight reduction.

The aircraft feature a "Hotel Mode", in which the number 2 (right-hand) engine can be operated on the ground with its propeller held stationary by a propeller brake, providing electrical power and compressed air to the aircraft without requiring an auxiliary power unit.

In the majority of configurations, passengers board the ATR 72 using the rear door, a relatively unusual configuration for a passenger aircraft, while the front door is typically used for the loading and unloading of cargo; early customer Finnair intentionally ordered its ATR 72s with a front passenger door so that it could utilize the jet bridges at Helsinki Airport, while operator Air New Zealand's standard rear door aircraft can use jet bridges at airports with this equipment. While passengers are boarding or disembarking, a tail stand is set into place as standard procedure to guard against the aircraft nose lifting off the ground.

== Operational history ==
2011 was a record-breaking year for sales at ATR. According to ATR's CEO Filippo Bagnato, sales had continued to grow during the Great Recession despite the downturn experienced by most aviation companies as "fuel consumption that can be half that of the alternatives and [with] lower maintenance costs". Bagnato noted the strength of Africa as a market for the type, as well at the firm's aircraft being capable of serving destinations that would otherwise be inaccessible to other aircraft due to the austere conditions of many airstrips and runways in the region, as well as the ability to operate autonomously without any reliance upon ground support equipment.

For 2013, ATR claimed a 48 percent global market share for regional aircraft deliveries between 50 and 90 seats (comprising both turboprops and jets), making it the dominant manufacturer in this market segment. That same year, during which firm orders for 10 ATR 42-600s and 79 ATR 72-600s were recorded, leasing companies were responsible for 70 per cent of these; according to ATR's CEO Filippo Bagnato: "Years ago, we were not even considered by the lessors; now they see ATRs as a good investment". Several major leasing companies operate their own ATR fleets, such as Dubai Aerospace Enterprise (DAE), who placed an order for 20 ATR 72s along with options for another 20 in February 2014, and Nordic Aviation Capital (NAC), who ordered a fleet of 30 ATR 72s during June 2013, along with options for up to 55 further airliners. Placing their first order during 2011, by December 2012, Singaporean lessor Avation had a combined total of 20 ATR 72s on order; by February 2016, the number on order for Avation had risen to 35 aircraft.

During May 1997, ATR achieved their first breakthrough sale in China, placed by operator China Xinjiang Airlines and the Civil Aviation Administration of China (CAAC). By 2013, while the Asia Pacific region had comprised the majority of ATR's sales when geographically ranked; however, orders from Chinese airlines remained elusive; Bagnato ascribed this anomaly to local market conditions dictating the typical use of larger aircraft, as well as a Chinese government policy of imposing high tariffs on the import of foreign-built fixed-wing aircraft. During late 2014, ATR set up a new office in Beijing and hired several former Airbus sales personnel with the aim of launching the type in the Chinese market. ATR believed that many of the already-flown routes did not suit larger 150-seat aircraft; however, of the roughly 2,600 commercial aircraft flying in China at that time, only 68 had a capacity of less than 90 seats and of these, fewer than 20 were powered by turboprop engines.

In response to airlines often wanting to replace their early production ATR models with the latest generation ATR series, as well as to answer demand from cargo operators for the type, ATR has operated two separate dedicated freighter conversion programmes, known as the Bulk Freighter (tube version) and the ULD Freighter. Both conversions involve complete stripping of furnishings along with the addition of floor strengthening, new window plugs and 9 g restraining nets, six additional longitudinal tracks for added flexibility, and an E-Class cabin; the ULD model can accommodate standard ULD-packaged cargo, such as LD3 containers or 2.2 by 2.7 metres (88 by 108 in) pallets, which were loaded via a large cargo door located on the port forward side. Undertaken by a range of companies, such as Alenia subsidiary Aeronavali, Texas-based M7 Aerospace; French firms Indraéro Siren and Aeroconseil, Canadian Infinion Certification Engineering, and Spanish company Arrodisa, by October 2012, in excess of one-fifth of all first-generation ATR 42 and ATR 72 aircraft had already been converted to freighters.

=== Iran Air ===
During February 2016, ATR signed a deal with flag carrier Iran Air for a batch of 20 ATR 72-600s, along with options for 20 more aircraft and post-purchase services, such as engine maintenance. Made possible by a negotiated relaxation of international sanctions against Iran, during June 2017, a €1 billion Iranian contract was finalized for the firm 20 airliners and 20 options; the delivery of the first four aircraft occurred within weeks of the deal being completed. US sanctions against Iran were reimposed in August 2018, by which time 13 of the order of 20 aircraft had been delivered. In April 2019 the US Office of Foreign Assets Control (OFAC) issued a two-year licence to ATR to allow it to supply spare parts and other essentials to keep the fleet of 13 ATR 72-600s in operation. However, the remaining 7 ATR 72-600s from the 2016 order remain sanctioned and in storage.

=== Turkish Navy ===
While primarily used as a civil aircraft, some ATR 72s have been adapted to perform in various military functions, such as utility aircraft and maritime patrol aircraft (MPA). The Turkish Navy, which initially decided to purchase ten ATR 72-500 MPA, later changed its order to eight aircraft: Two ATR 72-600 TMUA (Turkish Maritime Utility Aircraft) versions, and six ATR 72-600 TMPA (Turkish Maritime Patrol Aircraft for MP/ASW/ASuW duties) versions. The armed ATR 72 TMPA variant was developed in cooperation with Turkish Aerospace Industries (TAI), and incorporated additional sensors and mission systems to perform its intended combat role. During 2013, the two ATR 72-600 TMUA aircraft were delivered to the Turkish Navy. The first ATR 72-600 TMPA was delivered in December 2020 and the second one in March 2021 was already in service with Turkish Navy. As of May 2021, 3 ATR 72-600 TMUA aircraft are being operated by the Turkish Navy.

=== Italian Air Force ===
The Italian Air Force selected the ATR 72-600 MP, designated as the P-72A, to serve as a multirole maritime patrol, electronic surveillance and C4 platform. The original Italian requirement for a Breguet Atlantic replacement had also called for ASW and anti-surface warfare (ASuW) capabilities, however, during 2014, the contract was renegotiated to a configuration that excluded these capabilities. An anticipated variant for ASW and ASuW operations may later be pursued; accordingly, provisions were made to allow for the four P-72As on order to be adapted to the ASW configuration. In December 2016, the first pair of P-72A aircraft were delivered to the Italian Air Force. The last aircraft was delivered to the Italian Air Force in February 2021.

=== Guardia di Finanza ===
A single ATR 72 MP was ordered by Italy's paramilitary Guardia di Finanza (GdF) in July 2019, followed by an order for a further three ATR 72s in October 2019. The aircraft, called P-72B by Guardia di Finanza, will supplement the GdF's existing force of four ATR-42s in the border surveillance, maritime patrol and search and rescue roles.

=== FedEx Express ===
On 8 November 2017, FedEx Express launched the -600 cargo variant with 30 firm orders plus 20 options, in a freighter configuration from the factory.

=== Deliveries and prices ===
As of September 2018, 187 early variants had been produced with 172 operated by 55 carriers, 365 -500s were delivered with more than 350 in service at 75 operators, 444 -600s were produced and are operated by 74 carriers with a backlog of 231 orders. By then, with more than 60 -500s and 40 -600s in storage, new aircraft leases fell to $130,000 per month from $170,000. The -600 list price of $26.8M is typically discounted by 25% for a $20.1M value, a 2012 aircraft is valued $13.3M and leased $115,000, falling to $10.2M and $100,000 in 2021, a D check costs $0.5M and the engine overhaul costs $0.3-1.0M.

=== Failed bids ===
The ATR 72 was a candidate to replace the German Navy's P-3, at least as a stopgap solution from 2025 to 2032. Germany ultimately selected the P-8A Poseidon in 2021.

== Variants ==
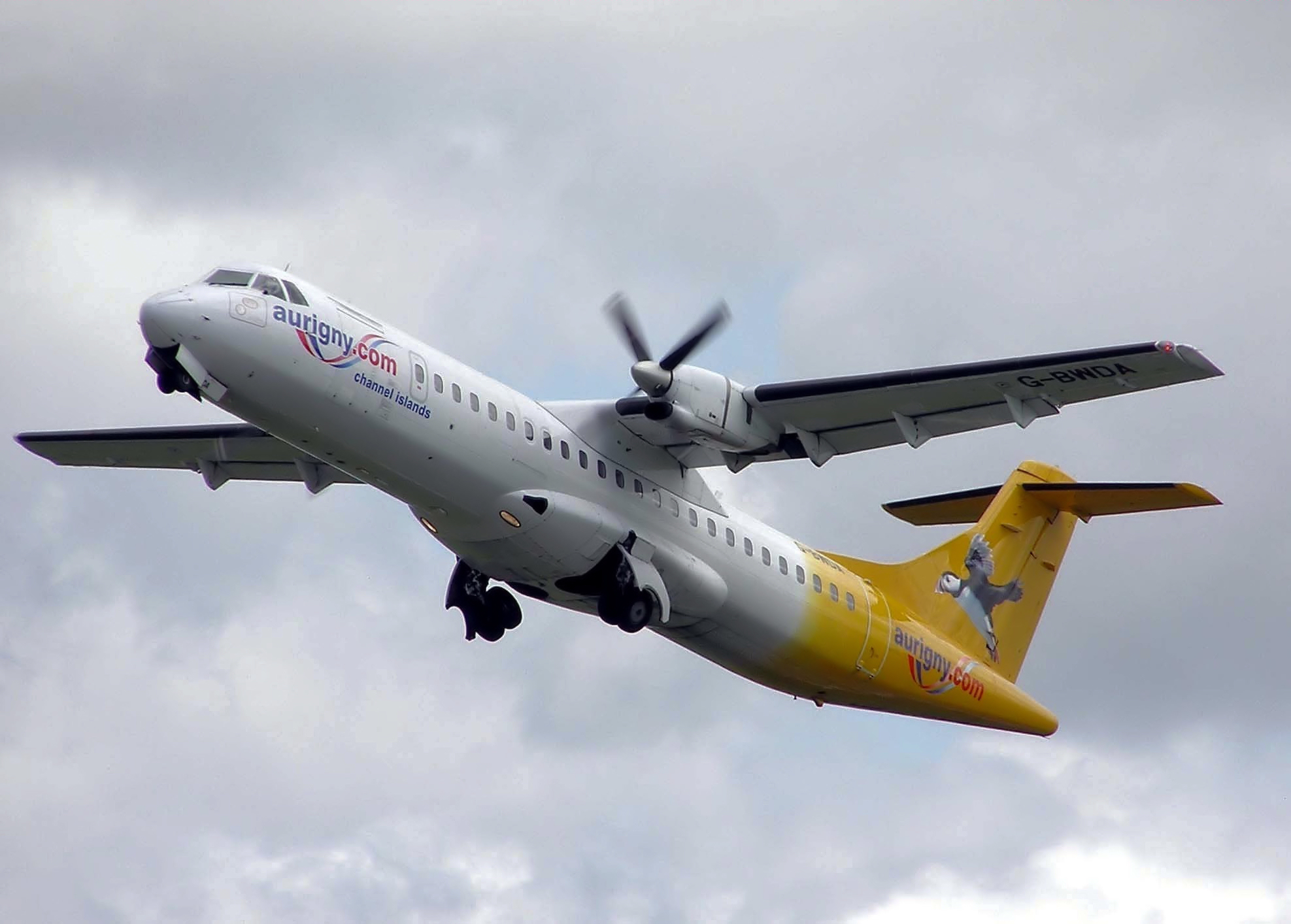
Early ATR 72-200/210 series have four-bladed propellers

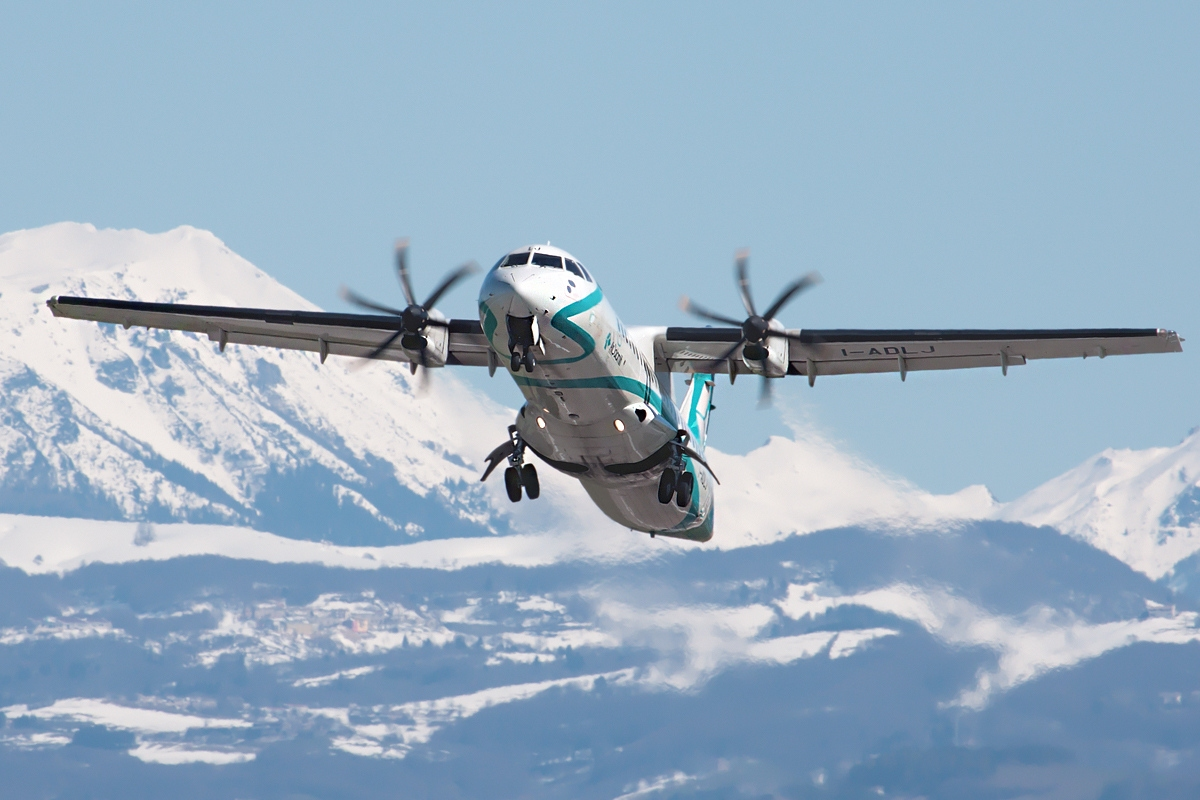
Later ATR 72-500/600 series have six-bladed propellers

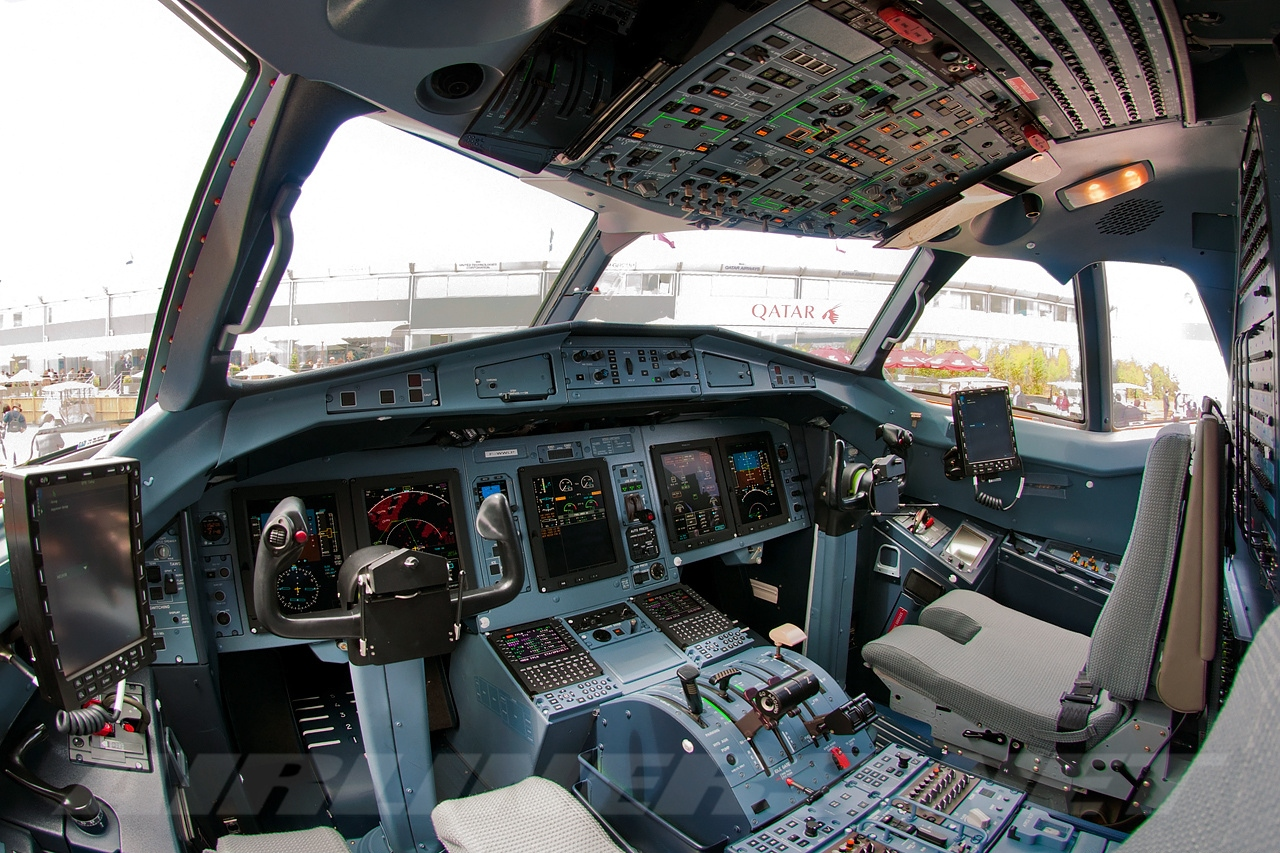
An ATR 72-600 cockpit

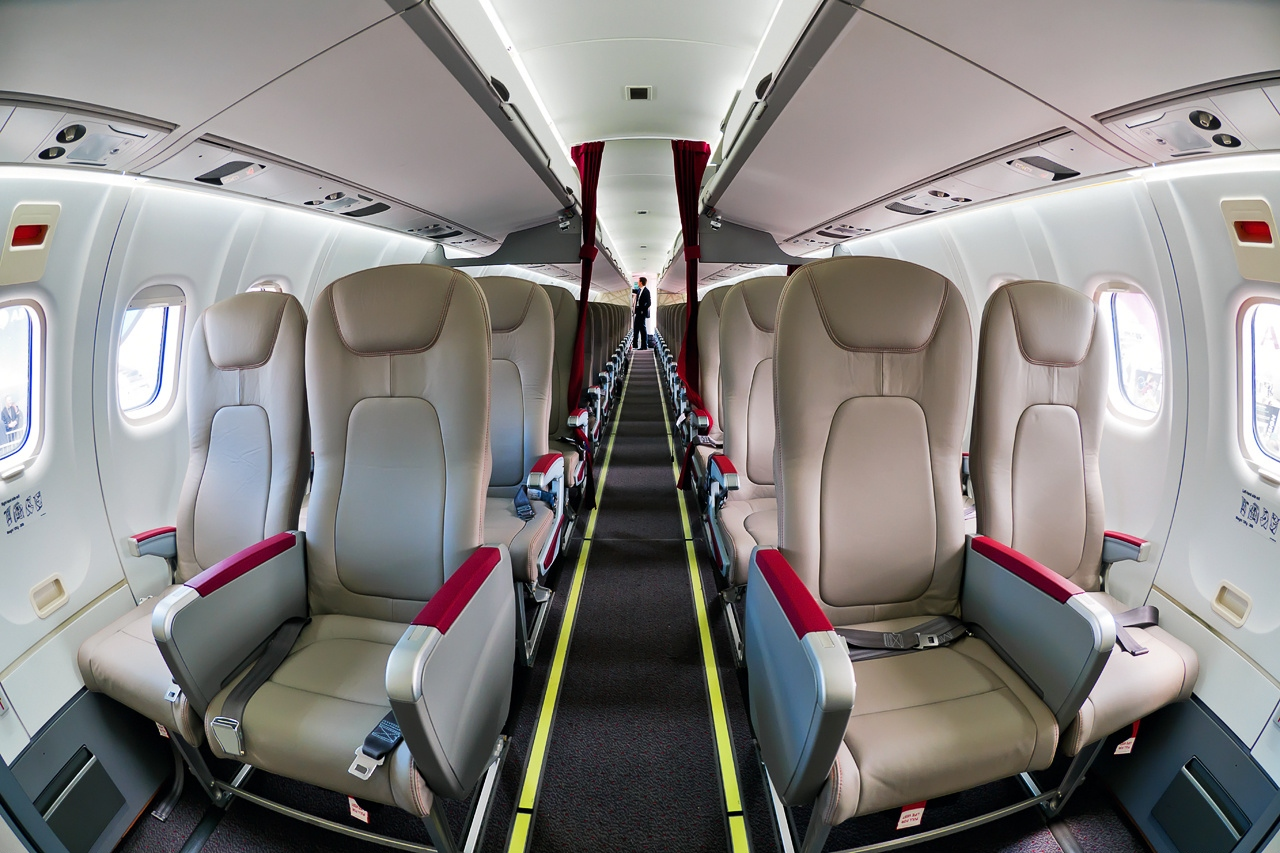
ATR 72-600 cabin

=== ATR 72-100 ===
Two subtypes were marketed as the 100 series (-100).

ATR 72–101
Initial production variant with front and rear passenger doors, powered by two PW124B engines and certified in September 1989.
ATR 72–102
Initial production variant with a front cargo door and a rear passenger door, powered by two PW124B engines and certified in December 1989.

=== ATR 72-200 ===
Two sub-types were marketed as the 200 series (-200). The -200 was the original production version, powered by Pratt & Whitney Canada PW124B engines rated at 2,400 shp (1,800 kW).

ATR 72-201
Higher maximum take-off weight variant of the -101, a PW124B-powered variant certified in September 1989.
ATR 72-202
Higher maximum take-off weight variant of the -102, a PW124B-powered variant certified in December 1989.

=== ATR 72-210 ===
Two subtypes were marketed as the 210 series (-210): the -211 (and with an enlarged cargo door, called the -212) is a -200 with PW127 engines producing 2,750 shp (2,050 kW) each for improved performance in hot and high-altitude conditions. The subtypes differ in the type of doors and emergency exits.

ATR 72-211
PW127-powered variant certified in December 1992.
ATR 72-212
PW127-powered variant certified in December 1992.

=== ATR 72-212A ===
Certified in January 1997 and fitted with either PW127F or PW127M engines, the -212A is an upgraded version of the -210 using six-bladed propellers on otherwise identical PW127F engines. Other improvements include higher maximum weights and superior performance, as well as greater automation of power management to ease pilot workload.

ATR 72-500
Initial marketing name for the ATR 72-212A.

ATR 72-600

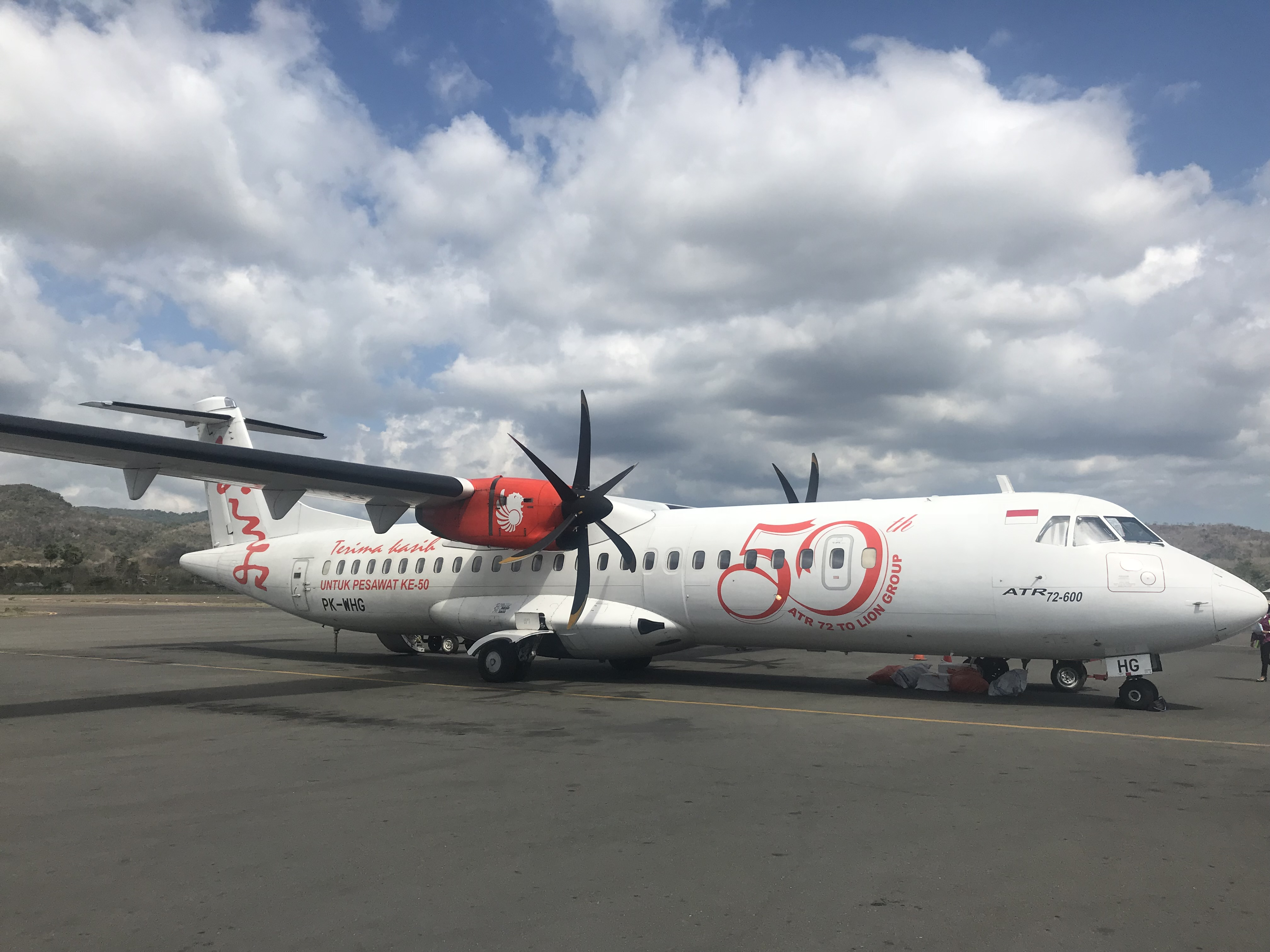
Wings Air ATR 72-600 with special livery as the 50th delivered aircraft

Marketing name for ATR 72-212A with different equipment fit. The -600 series aircraft was announced in October 2007; the first deliveries were planned for the second half of 2010. The prototype ATR 72-600 first flew on 24 July 2009; it had been converted from an ATR 72-500.

The ATR 72-600 features several improvements. It is powered by the new PW127M engines, which enable a 5% increase in takeoff power via a "boost function" used only when called for by takeoff conditions. The flight deck features five wide LCD screens (improving on the EFIS of earlier versions). A multi-purpose computer (MPC) aims at increasing flight safety and operational capabilities, and new Thales-made avionics provide Required Navigation Performance (RNP) capabilities. It also features lighter seats and larger overhead baggage bins. In December 2015, the EASA approved a new high-density seating layout, raising the maximum capacity from 74 to 78 seats.
During the 2021 Dubai Airshow in mid-November 2021, ATR debuted the new ATR 72-600 engine which is powered by new PW127XT powerplants with 20% lower maintenance cost and 3% lower fuel consumption than the predecessor PW127M powerplant.

=== ATR 72-600 HighLine Editions ===
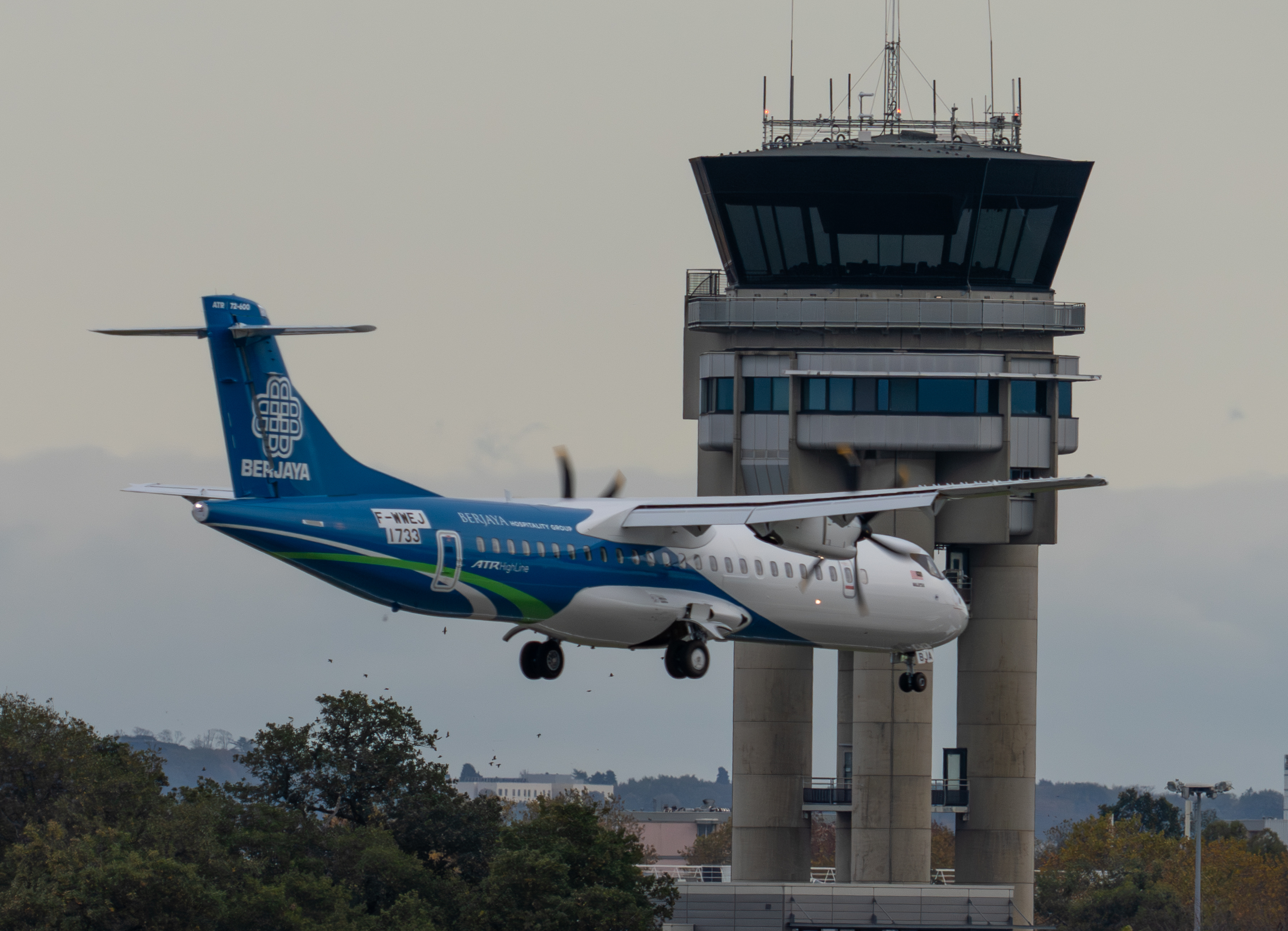
A pre-delivery ATR HighLine to Berjaya Air, the aircraft's first customer

The ATR 72-600 HighLine is the same as the ATR 72-600 however it featured an executive cabin layout.

=== ATR 72MP ===
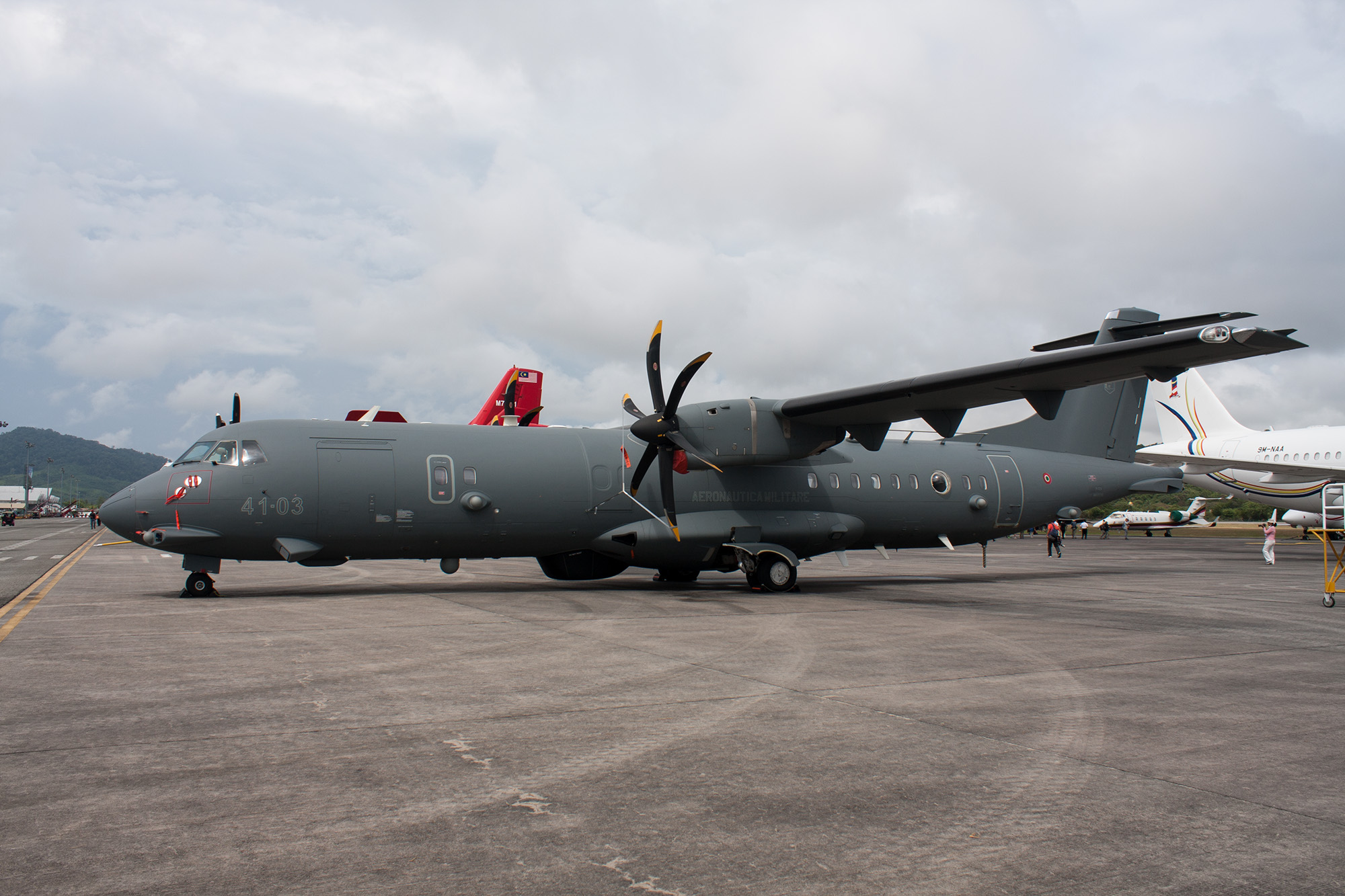
ATR 72MP of Italian Air Force

The ATR 72MP is an ATR 72-600 derivative developed by Leonardo for search and rescue, maritime patrol, command and control, communication, computers, intelligence, surveillance and reconnaissance (C4ISR). Leonardo Electronics designed its Airborne Tactical Observation and Surveillance (ATOS) backbone to manage its sensors, combine their output in a tactical situation presented on up to four workstations.

The main sensors are

- a multimode radar, also with active electronically scanned array (AESA) like the Leonardo Electronics Seaspray 7300;
- an electro-optical turret (EO/IR);
- an automatic identification system (AIS);
- an airborne search and rescue direction finder (ASARS DF).

A tactical display is added to the glass cockpit and can be integrated with INS/GPS positioning systems and IFF transponder. Three U/VHF radios, one HF radio and a wideband SATCOM are used for communications. Other sensors, systems and communications equipment can be integrated, like an electronic support measure (ESM) system. A defensive aids sub-system (DASS) is optionally available for operation in hostile areas.

ATR 72 ASW
The ATR 72 ASW integrates the ATR 72 MP (Maritime Patrol) mission system with similar on-board equipment, but with additional anti-submarine warfare (ASW) capabilities. A variant of the -600 (itself a version of the maritime patrol model of the ATR 42-600) is also in production. For the ASW and ASuW missions, it is armed with lightweight aerial torpedoes. They are equipped with the Thales AMASCOS (Airborne Maritime Situation and Control System) surveillance system as well as electronic warfare and reconnaissance systems, enabling the type to perform maritime search and rescue duties.

ATR 72-600 MAR
The ATR 72-600 MAR is an unarmed maritime surveillance version equipped with ELI-3360MPA system designed by Elbit Systems for the Philippine Air Force. Its capabilities are airborne ocean surface surveillance, telemetry recording and relay. Modified with AN/APS-143 Multi-Mode X-Band Maritime Surveillance Radar with Integrated IFF Interrogator to detect objects in the South China Sea and Benham Rise, the aircraft can detect a person in a life raft up to 128 km away in the water. It downlinks this telemetry data to a ground-based surveillance center which is to be integrated to the National Coast Watch Center system. It has the capability to relay four airborne UHF frequencies over the horizon to ground sites. Additional Mission Management System (MMS), L-3 Wescam MX-20HD electro-optical sensor system for intelligence, surveillance, and reconnaissance (ISR) and Signals Intelligence (SIGINT) capabilities.

-600F
A purpose-built freighter variant of the -600, 8 November 2017 launch with 30 firm orders from FedEx plus 20 options. The first flight of the variant took place on 16 September 2020; it was EASA certified by early December. In December 2020, FedEx Express received the first one of its order of 30, to be operated by ASL Airlines Ireland between Paris Charles de Gaulle and the Czech Republic. FedEx should receive six aircraft per year until 2025, later freighters will fly in the US and in Latin America. Compared to the passenger airliner, windows are removed, the floor is reinforced and a large front cargo door is added to load seven LD3 containers. ATR forecasts a market for 460 converted or new-build turboprop freighters over 20 years.

=== Other versions ===
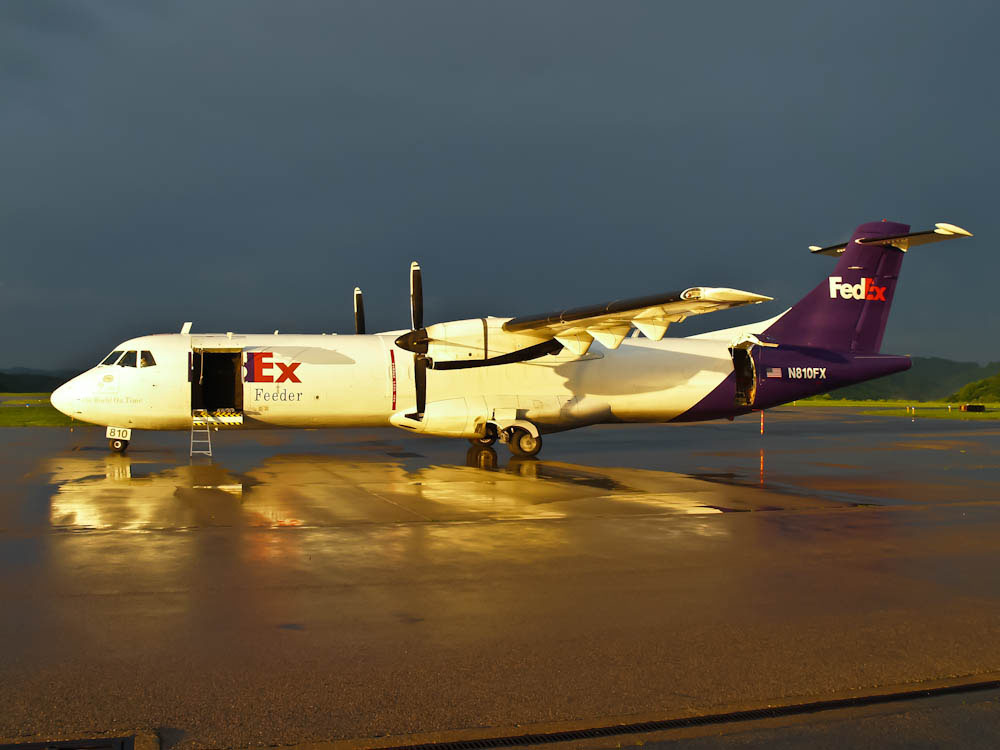
A FedEx Express Bulk Freighter with its cargo door open and parking tail stand in place

Cargo
Bulk Freighter (tube versions) and ULD Freighter (Large Cargo Door). ATR unveiled a large cargo door modification for all ATR 72 at Farnborough 2002, coupled with a dedicated cargo conversion. FedEx, DHL, and UPS all operate the type.

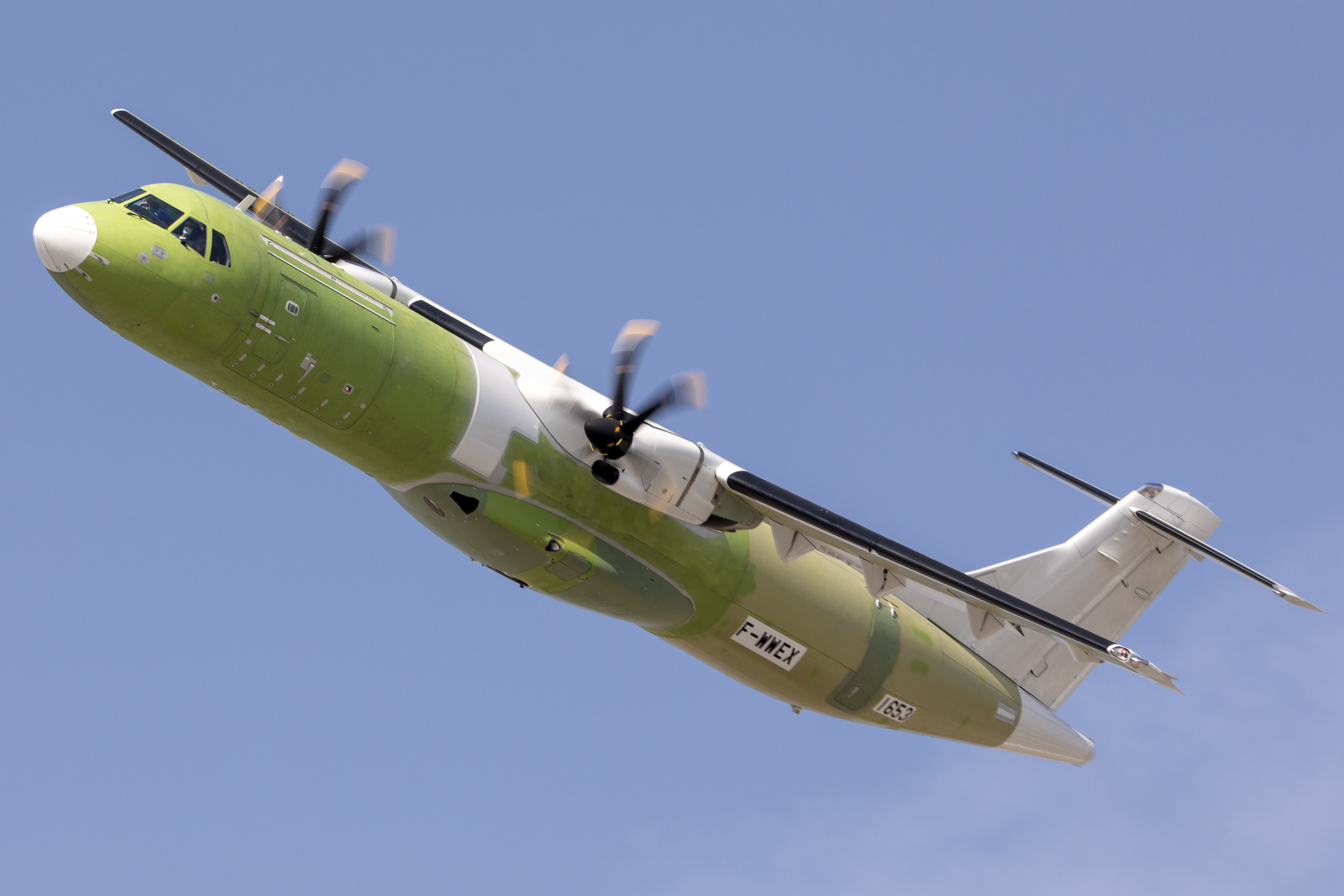
Purpose-Built ATR 72-600F first flight on 16 September 2020

Corporate
A VIP version of the -500 is available with a luxury interior for executive or corporate transport.

ATR 82
During the mid-1980s, the company investigated a 78-seat derivative of the ATR 72. This would have been powered by two Allison AE2100 turboprops (turbofans were also studied for a time) and would have had a cruising speed as high as 330 knots (610 km/h; 380 mph). The ATR-82 project (as it was dubbed) was suspended when AI(R) was formed in early 1996.

ATR 82 TF
ATR also studied a turbofan version of the proposed ATR 82 (stretched version of the ATR 72) in the early 1990s. Powered by either the Allison GMA 3007 or the General Electric CF34, the aircraft would have a range of about 1,000 nmi (1,900 km; 1,200 mi) and cruise at 375 kn (694 km/h; 432 mph) at an altitude of 25,000 ft (7,600 m).

ATR Quick Change
This proposed version targeted the increasing demand of worldwide cargo and express mail markets, where the aim is to allow operators to supplement their passengers flights with freighter flights. In Quick Change configuration, the smoke detector is equipped alongside other modifications required in order to meet the certification for full freight operations. The aircraft was equipped with a larger cargo door (1.27 m [50 in] wide and 1.52 m [60 in] high) and low door-sill height of an average 1.2 m (4 ft), facilitating containerised freight loading. It takes 30 minutes to convert the ATR 42, and 45 minutes to convert the ATR 72. Each optimized container has 2.8 m^{3} (99 cu ft) of usable volume and maximum payload is 435 kg (960 lb).

== Major operators ==
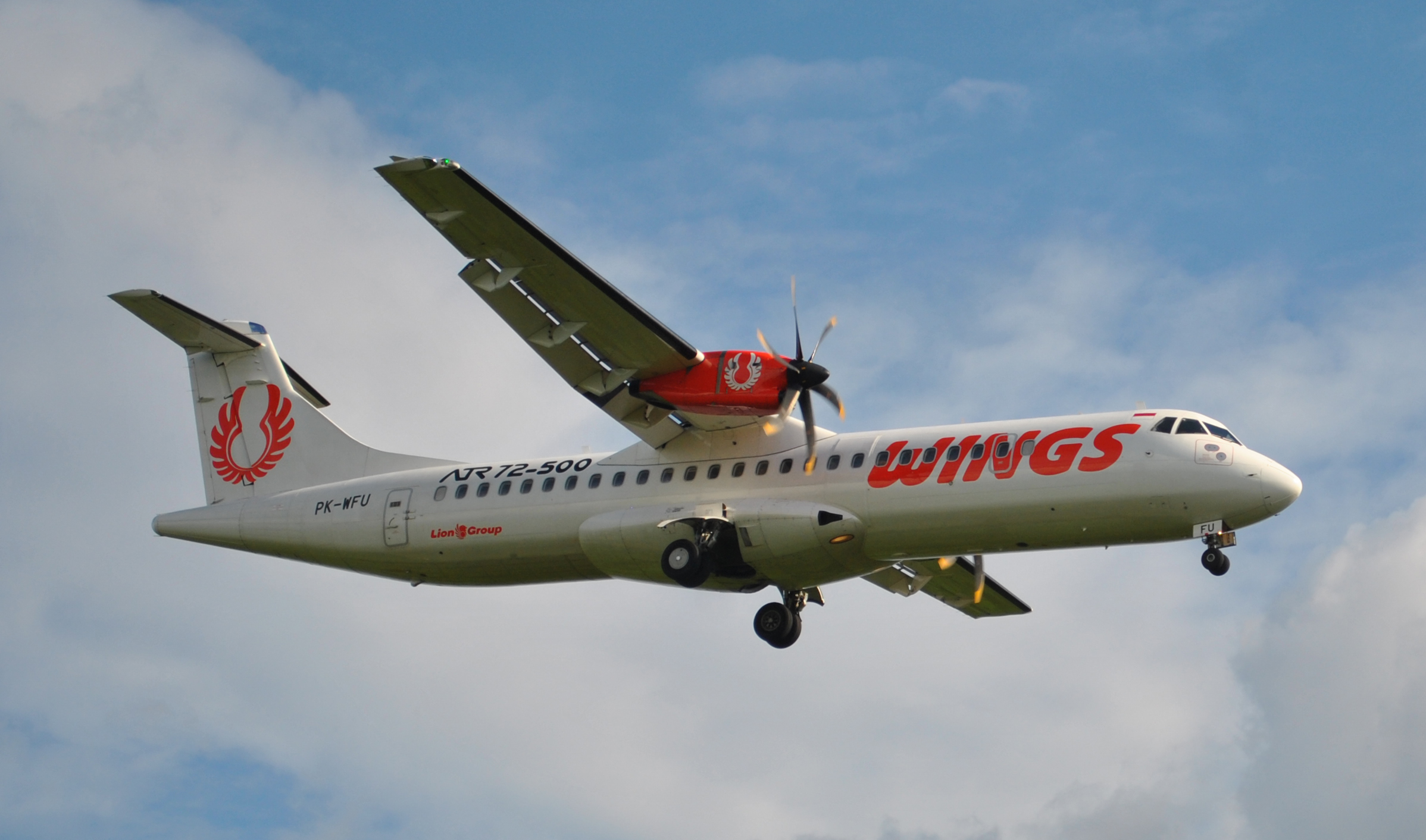
An ATR 72–500 of Wings Air, the largest operators of the type

=== Civilian operators ===
Airline operators with more than 15 aircraft
Airline	100	200F	500	600	600F	Total
Wings Air (Lion Group)	–	–	18	59	–	77
IndiGo	–	–	–	44	–	44
FedEx Express	–	19	–	–	24	43
Azul Brazilian Airlines	–	–	–	40	–	40
Air New Zealand	–	–	–	31	–	31
Cebgo	–	–	7	13	1	21
Alliance Air	–	–	–	18	–	18
Swiftair	–	6	3	5	4	18
Buddha Air	–	–	15	1	–	16
Air Algérie	–	12	–	3	–	15
UTair	–	–	15	–	–	15

=== Military operators ===
Italy

- Italian Air Force
- Guardia di Finanza

Malaysia

- Royal Malaysian Air Force – Maritime patrol variant on order.

Pakistan

- Pakistan Navy

Philippines

- Philippine Air Force – Maritime patrol aircraft 2 ATR 72-600 Aircraft Delivered . With Elbit Systems supplying ELI-3360.

Turkey

- Turkish Navy

== Accidents and incidents ==
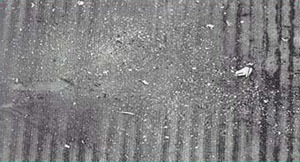
Remains of American Eagle Flight 4184, the first fatal accident involving the ATR 72

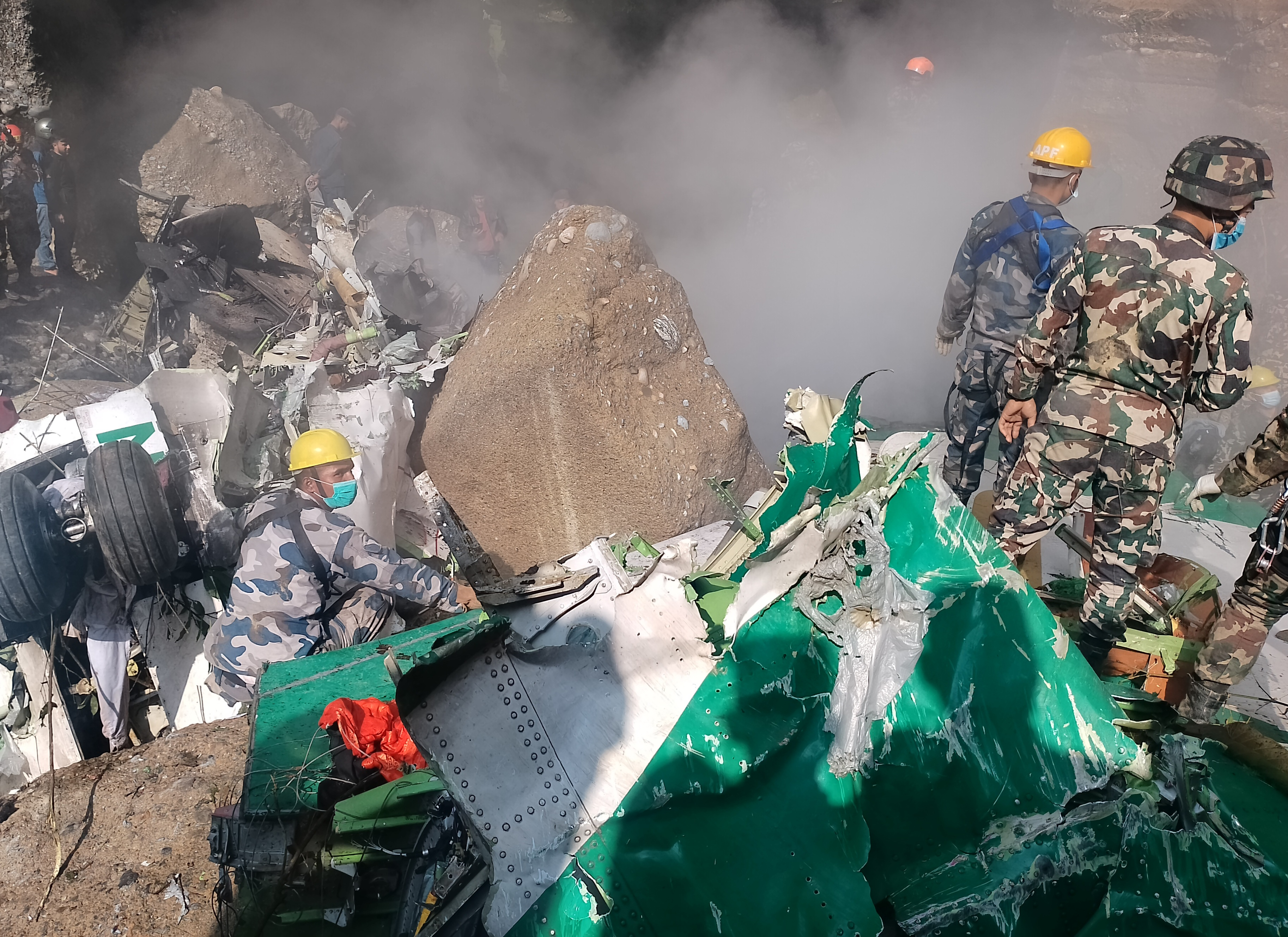
Remains of Yeti Airlines Flight 691, the deadliest accident involving the ATR 72

The ATR 72 has been involved in 66 aviation accidents and incidents, including 40 hull losses, resulting in 532 fatalities. As of August 2024, there have been 13 accidents with at least one fatality reported, 5 of which involved icing conditions. The first fatal accident involving the aircraft was American Eagle Flight 4184 on 31 October 1994, with 68 fatalities, while the most recent accident occurred on 9 August 2024 when Voepass Linhas Aéreas Flight 2283 crashed resulting in 62 fatalities.

Accidents involving the aircraft
Date	Flight	Variant	Fat.	Surv.	Location	Event
31 Oct 1994	American Eagle 4184	-212	68	0	United States, near Roselawn, IN	Atmospheric icing resulting in a loss of control and crash. Inadequate documentation.
30 Jan 1995	TransAsia 510A	-202	4	0	Taiwan, near Taipei	Crashed into a hillside, the four crew died. Failure to maintain situational awareness and cross check navigation.
21 Dec 2002	TransAsia 791	-202	2	0	Taiwan, near Makung City	Crashed due to icing, both crew died. Incorrect procedures.
6 Aug 2005	Tuninter 1153	-202	16	23	Italy, near Palermo	Ditched due to fuel exhaustion caused by maintenance installing inappropriate indicators.
4 Aug 2009	Bangkok Airways 266	-500	1	71	Thailand, Koh Samui Airport	Skid into a disused tower, the captain died.
4 Nov 2010	Aero Caribbean 883	-212	68	0	Cuba, near Guasimal	Crashed due to icing and bad crew decisions.
2 Apr 2012	UTair 120	-201	33	10	Russia, Tyumen Airport	Crashed soon after takeoff. Incorrect deicing procedures.
16 Oct 2013	Lao Airlines 301	-600	49	0	Laos, near Pakse Airport	Crashed into the Mekong while on approach. Incorrect procedures.
23 Jul 2014	TransAsia 222	-500	48	10	Taiwan near Magong Airport	Crashed while landing. Incorrect procedures.
4 Feb 2015	TransAsia 235	-600	43	15	Taiwan, Keelung near Taipei	Engine failed after takeoff, crashed into water upside down after remaining engine shut down by mistake.
18 Feb 2018	Iran Aseman 3704	-212	66	0	Iran, near Yasuj Airport	Crashed into Mount Dena. Incorrect procedures.
15 Jan 2023	Yeti Airlines 691	-500	72	0	Nepal, Pokhara	Crashed while landing after banking sharply to the left with mistakenly feathered propellers.
9 Aug 2024	Voepass Linhas Aéreas 2283	-500	62	0	Brazil, near Vinhedo	Crashed after abruptly falling from cruising altitude, videos show the plane in a flat spin before impact. All 62 passenger and crew bodies were recovered. The preliminary report states "after encountering icing conditions, control of the aircraft was lost and it crashed into the ground".

== Specifications ==
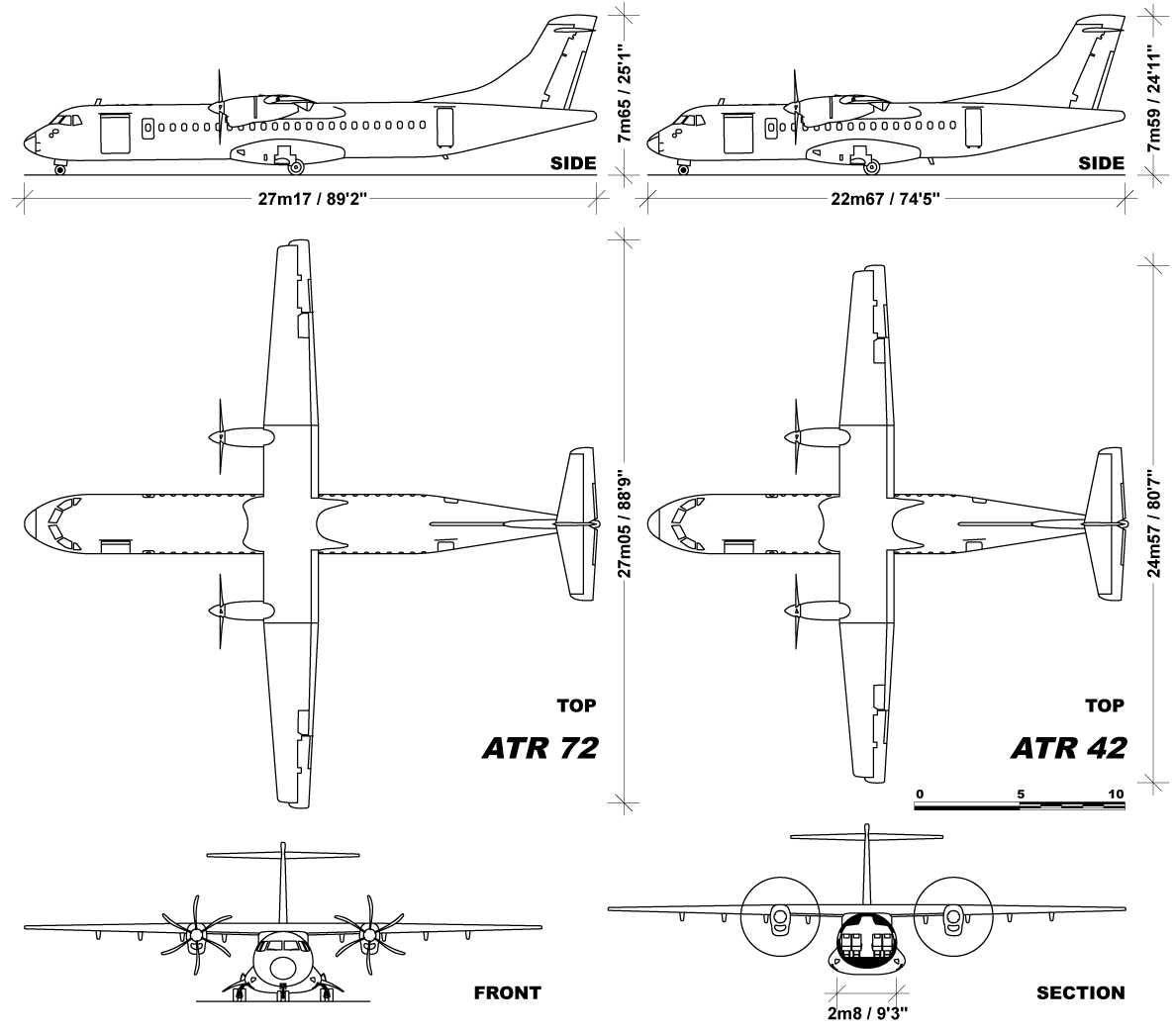
Line drawings of ATR 72 and shorter ATR 42 aircraft

Model	ATR 72-200	ATR-72-210	ATR 72-500	ATR 72-600
Crew	4			
Capacity	66@31"			72@29"
Length	27.17 m (89 ft 2 in)			
Height	7.65 m (25 ft 1 in)			
Wingspan	27.05 m (88 ft 9 in)			
Wing area	61.0 m^{2} (665 sq ft)			
Aspect Ratio	12			
Width	2.57 m (8 ft 5 in) (cabin, maximum)			
Max takeoff weight	22,000 kg (48,501 lb)			23,000 kg (50,265 lb)
Operating empty	12,400 kg (27,337 lb)	12,450 kg (27,447 lb)	12,950 kg (28,549 lb)	13,010 kg (28,682 lb)
Max payload	7,000 kg (15,432 lb)			7,550 kg (16,645 lb)
Max fuel	5,000 kg (11,023 lb)			
Engines (2x)	PW124B	PW127	PW127F/M	PW127M/N/XT
Unit power	2,400 SHP	2,750 SHP		
High speed cruise	278 kn (515 km/h)	279 kn (517 km/h)	275 kn (510 km/h)	
Ceiling	7,600 m (25,000 ft)			
Range (Max pax)	862 nmi (992 mi; 1,596 km)	791 nmi (910 mi; 1,465 km)	772 nmi (888 mi; 1,430 km)	758 nmi (872 mi; 1,404 km)
Takeoff (MTOW, SL, ISA)	1,409 m (4623 ft)	1,211 m (3973 ft)	1,224 m (4,016 ft)	1,279 m (4,196 ft)
Landing (MLW, SL)	1,036 m (3,399 ft)	902 m (2,959 ft)	899 m (2,949 ft)	915 m (3,002 ft)

== See also ==
Related development

- ATR 42
- ATR 52

Aircraft of comparable role, configuration, and era

- Airbus C295
- British Aerospace ATP
- De Havilland Canada Dash 8
- Fokker 60
- Ilyushin Il-114
- Saab 2000
- Xi'an MA700
