= Aero International (Regional) =

Multinational aviation consortium

Aero International (Regional) or AI(R) was a short-lived multi-national consortium intended to merge the businesses of the French-Italian Avions de Transport Regional (ATR) and British Aerospace Regional Aircraft (BAe) (which comprised Avro International Aerospace and Jetstream Aircraft).

AI(R) was launched in 1996 to perform marketing, sales, support and aircraft development of the partners' transport aircraft and to oversee future programs.

In its first year of operation, AI(R) earned USD1.3b on sales of 38 turboprops and 21 regional jets.

AI(R)'s product range included the British Aerospace Jetstream 31 and 41, but BAe announced it would cease production in May 1997. The proposed Jetstream 61, an improved British Aerospace ATP, was cancelled because it overlapped with the already established ATR 72.

AI(R)'s AIRJET project studied a new 70-seat regional jet for two years developed from the ATR-42, before deciding not to proceed in December 1997, after BAe decided it would not make a major investment in the project.

In 1997 another plan to build a 100-seat jet with Asian partner companies was transferred to Airbus Industrie.

The organization disbanded in July 1998, with ATR and British Aerospace regaining full independence.
