= ATR 52 =

Unbuilt European airliner and military transport aircraft

General information
- Type: airliner and military transport aircraft
- National origin: International joint venture between France and Italy
- Manufacturer: ATR
- Status: Abandoned project

History
- Developed from: ATR 42 or ATR 72

The ATR 52 was a project to develop a military transport aircraft and a 50-seat airliner to add to ATR's product range. The manufacturer pursued the project throughout the 1990s, but was never able to attract sufficient interest from customers to make the project viable. Over the course of the decade, the design shifted from being a stretched ATR 42 to a shortened ATR 72.

== Design and development ==
Like other members of the ATR family, the ATR 52 was to be a high-wing cantilever monoplane of conventional design with a T-tail. It was to be powered by two wing-mounted turboprop engines driving tractor-mounted propellers. The design featured retractable tricycle undercarriage, the main units of which retracted into sponsons on the fuselage sides.

ATR announced the project in April 1992 and undertook a market survey among prospective customers. At the time, the aircraft was described as an ATR 42 with a 1.92-metre (6.30 ft) fuselage stretch and an enlarged dorsal fin. The military transport version, designated ATR 52C would be fitted with a cargo loading ramp at the rear of the fuselage, plus roller tracks in the floor and fittings for cargo nets. In this configuration, the aircraft could have accommodated three cargo pallets, or five LD3 cargo containers, or three smaller pallets plus one LD3. A dedicated medevac version would accommodate three tiers of four stretchers per fuselage side, for a total of 24.

The passenger version would have 50 seats, four abreast. Development of this version was seen as contingent on a non-competition agreement with other members of the Regioliner consortium and the development of the Dornier 328 with similar capabilities.

At the time of the announcement, ATR estimated the world market for the military transport to be around 230 aircraft over the next ten years, and the development cost to be around $180 million. The CEO of ATR, Henri-Paul Puel said that the company was looking for risk sharing partners to contribute about 50% of that amount. It was envisaged at the time that the military version could be assembled by ATR constituent firm Alenia at their Capodichino plant while the civil version might have been built by Aérospatiale in Toulouse.

The cargo ramp was a competitive advantage for the military version, as ATR had recently lost a French Air Force tender where the ramp-equipped CASA CN-235 was selected over ATR's proposal: an ATR 42 with a sliding door that was deemed "impractical". Another competitor, the Fokker 50, also lacked a ramp.

By the end of 1992, estimated worldwide demand had climbed to 400 aircraft, and orders from India, South Africa, and Romania appeared forthcoming, accounting for around 20 units.

During 1993, the basis for the design changed from being a stretched ATR 42 to being an ATR 72-210 with a fuselage shortened by 3.176 metres (10 ft 5.0 in). The precise location of the cut had not yet been determined because it would be contingent on the weight of the rear ramp assembly. The rear passenger doors were to be modified in a similar way to the ATR 42M to allow for paratroop deployment, with the aircraft able to carry 41 such troops.

Australia, Thailand, and Taiwan all joined the list of prospective customers, but by the end of the decade, ATR had still not found a launch partner, and as of 2010, no ATR 52 had ever been built.

== Specifications (ATR 72-based versions, as designed) ==
Data from Taylor, Lambert & Munson 1993, p.133

General characteristics

- Crew: two pilots
- Capacity: 7,500 kilograms (16,500 lb) cargo (ATR 52C) or 50 passengers (ATR 52)
- Length: 23.99 m (78 ft 8 in)
- Wingspan: 27.05 m (88 ft 9 in)
- Height: 4.10 m (13 ft 5 in)
- Empty weight: 11,600 kg (25,574 lb)
- Max takeoff weight: 20,000 kg (44,092 lb)
- Powerplant: 2 × Pratt & Whitney Canada PW127 turboprops, 2,060 kW (2,760 shp) each

Performance

- Range: 1,480 km (920 mi, 800 nmi) with 5,000 kilograms (11,000 lb) payload
