= Alf Hurley =

Australian rules footballer

Personal information
- Full name: Alf Hurley
- Born: 15 May 1913
- Died: 11 June 1991 (aged 78)
- Original team: Port Melbourne
- Height: 161 cm (5 ft 3 in)
- Weight: 66 kg (146 lb)
- Position: Forward

Playing career^{1}
Years	Club	Games (Goals)
1935–1938	Hawthorn	36 (60)
1938–1939	Fitzroy	16 (24)
1942	St Kilda	1 (0)
Total		53 (84)
- ^{1} Playing statistics correct to the end of 1942.

Alf Hurley (15 May 1913 – 11 June 1991) was an Australian rules footballer who played for the Hawthorn Football Club, Fitzroy Football Club and St Kilda Football Club in the Victorian Football League (VFL).
