= Arnold Kieffer =

Luxembourgish footballer

Personal information
- Date of birth: 30 September 1910
- Place of birth: Niederkorn, Luxembourg
- Date of death: 28 June 1991 (aged 80)
- Place of death: Differdange, Luxembourg

International career
| Years | Team | Apps | (Gls) |
- Luxembourg

Arnold Kieffer (30 September 1910 – 28 June 1991) was a Luxembourgish footballer. He competed in the men's tournament at the 1936 Summer Olympics.
