= Per Frøistad =

Norwegian footballer (1911-1991)

Personal information
- Date of birth: 29 August 1911
- Date of death: 2 June 1991 (aged 79)
- Position: Forward

International career
Years	Team	Apps	(Gls)
1939	Norway	1	(0)

Per Frøistad (29 August 1911 – 2 June 1991) was a Norwegian footballer. He played in one match for the Norway national football team in 1939.
