= Hector Moir =

Australian rules footballer, born 1909

Personal information
- Full name: Hector Moir
- Born: 3 December 1909
- Died: 24 June 1991 (aged 81)

Playing career^{1}
Years	Club	Games (Goals)
1930–31	North Melbourne	12 (6)
- ^{1} Playing statistics correct to the end of 1931.

Hector Moir (3 December 1909 – 24 June 1991) was an Australian rules footballer who played with North Melbourne in the Victorian Football League (VFL).
