= John Potter (fencer) =

American fencer

Personal information
- Born: January 12, 1910 Paris, France
- Died: June 4, 1991 (aged 81) Bordeaux, France

Sport
- Sport: Fencing

John Potter (January 12, 1910 – June 4, 1991) was an American fencer. He competed in the team foil event at the 1936 Summer Olympics.
