= Philip Weaver =

English cricketer

Personal information
- Full name: Philip Humphrey Peter Weaver
- Born: 12 March 1912; Kalimpong, Bengal Presidency, British India
- Died: 28 June 1991 (aged 79); Poole, Dorset, England
- Batting: Right-handed
- Bowling: Right-arm medium

Domestic team information
- Years: Team
- 1938: Hampshire

Career statistics
Competition	First-class
Matches	2
Runs scored	55
Batting average	18.33
100s/50s	–/–
Top score	37
Catches/stumpings	1/–
- Source: Cricinfo, 10 January 2009

Philip Humphrey Peter Weaver (12 March 1912 — 28 June 1991) was an English first-class cricketer and British Army officer, who served with the Special Air Service during the second half of the Second World War.

== Early life and sporting career ==
The son of the British Indian Army officer Humphrey Weaver, he was born in British India at Kalimpong in March 1912. He was educated in England at King's School, Bruton; his dyslexia prevented him from attending one of the more fashionable schools of the time. He played cricket with success for the school, making nearly 2,500 runs during his time there. In 1930, his aggregate for the school was 975 runs at an average of 75.53; however, despite his success, he was not invited to partake in the School's Week at Lord's. After completing his education, he worked for a paper mill in Bristol. In 1933, Weaver joined the Tank Corps, having been promised a place at Sandhurst after a year's service, however this never materialised as it transpired he was a month too old to be eligible, so he bought himself out of his military service in 1934. After this, he moved to Bournemouth, where he owned a tobacco and sweet shop, before moving into the dry cleaning and fruit machine businesses.

Weaver played field hockey and captained England in 1937. He played first-class cricket the following year for Hampshire, making one appearance in the County Championship against Glamorgan at Cardiff, and another against Cambridge University at Southampton. He scored 55 runs in his two matches, with a highest score of 37.

== Second World War service and later life ==
In 1937, he enlisted in the Territorial Royal Engineers, before receiving a call-up to the Dorset Regiment. During the Second World War, he received a commission in the Dorset Regiment as a second lieutenant in April 1941. He was subsequently posted to the West Dorset Scout Section of Auxiliary Units, where he trained members of the Home Guard. In August 1943, he took over as Intelligence Officer in charge of all Auxiliary Units in Dorset, succeeding Major Randle Darwall-Smith. With the Scout Sections being disestablished in late 1943, Weaver and many of his compatriots volunteered for the expanding Special Air Service (SAS), joining its 'B' Squadron. He had a narrow escape during his parachute training for the SAS, when the plane he was aboard collided with another during take-off, but managed to successfully land.

Weaver took part in Operation Bulbasket in German-occupied France in June–July 1944, landing near to Parthenay on the morning of 11 June, which was nearly 90 kilometres (56 miles) away from the main SAS party led by Captain John Tomkin. They were tasked with destroying a nearby railway, an objective which they achieved at 10am the following day. Weaver and his party then withdrew, marching for ten nights on decreasing rations. Eventually they sought food from local farmers and came across an American unit that had been sent to supply the French Resistance. They continued on to rendezvous with Tomkin and his men near Montmorillon on 24 June. However, upon arrival, there was no sign of Tomkin. A local farmer provided assistance to Weaver and his men, alerting the local maquis of their presence, who swiftly arrived and took them to a nearby village, which was devoid of any German presence. For three days they trained the maquis, before being driven to meet Tomkin at Verrières, where he had been directing sabotage efforts against German forces in the nearby town of Poitiers. After initial successes during the operation, the location of the SAS base was betrayed, with it coming under attack, resulting in the capture of 33 SAS soldiers; they were later executed by a German firing squad. Weaver survived the attack and regrouped with the remainder of 'B' Squadron, which identified the German barracks at Bonneuil-Matours and successfully attacked it with napalm. They were subsequently evacuated by the Royal Air Force aboard two Hudson's and by the United States Army Air Forces aboard a Dakota. Throughout the operation, Weaver was distinguishable from his comrades by his wearing of the beige beret, instead of the airborne maroon beret.

In March 1945, Weaver was made a war-substantive lieutenant. He was part of the SAS unit which helped to liberate Bergen-Belsen concentration camp in April 1945, with the SAS having come across the camp by chance. Following the war, he gained the full rank of lieutenant in November 1946. He had returned to the Dorset Regiment by 1947, when he was promoted to captain under a short service commission. In May 1952, he undertook a short service commission with the Royal Berkshire Regiment, before being promoted to major in April 1954. He relinquished his commission in March 1957. After retiring from military service, Weaver ran a chicken farm in Essex and played club cricket into his fifties. He died at Poole in June 1991.
