= Iker Belausteguigoitía =

Mexican sailor (1927–1991)

Personal information
- Nationality: Mexican
- Born: 9 October 1927; Bilbao, Spain
- Died: 8 June 1991 (aged 63); Álvaro Obregón, Mexico

Sport
- Sport: Sailing

Iker Belausteguigoitía (9 October 1927 – 8 June 1991) was a Mexican sailor. He competed at the 1964 Summer Olympics and the 1968 Summer Olympics.
