= Rosalina Abejo =

Filipina composer and conductor

Sister Rosalina Abejo RVM
- Born: Maria Rosalina Madroñal Abejo; July 13, 1922; Tagoloan, Misamis Oriental, Northern Mindanao, Philippines
- Died: June 5, 1991 (aged 68); Fremont, California, U.S.
- Education: Philippine Women's University; Eastman School of Music; The Catholic University of America

Sister Maria Rosalina Madroñal Abejo, RVM (July 13, 1922 – June 5, 1991) was a Filipino composer, pianist and conductor.

== Life and career ==
Rosalina Abejo was born in Tagoloan in Misamis Oriental in the Philippines, and died in Fremont, California. She is the first Filipina composer and conductor, and a nun of the Congregation of the Religious of the Virgin Mary. Her aunt, the late Sister Maria Rosario Madroñal, RVM was her first music teacher.She studied composition at the Philippine Women's University, and in 1977, she moved to the United States, where she studied at Eastman School of Music and The Catholic University of America.

Abejo was the first nun to direct and conduct symphony orchestras, by permission of Pope John XXIII. She taught composition and music theory at the University of Kansas and St Pius Seminary in Kentucky. Before this, she travelled extensively in order to fundraise for and attend international music conferences. In 1972, Abejo wrote Overture 1081, when martial law was declared by Ferdinand Marcos in the Philippines through Proclamation No. 1081. Abejo has received a number of honours, including the Republic Culture Heritage Award (1967), Philippines' Independence Day Award (1973), and being elected President of the Philippine Foundation of Performing Arts in America in 1980. She is interred at Irvington Memorial Cemetery, Fremont, California.

Abejo's musical style has been described as employing both "neo-classical and impressionist features."

== Compositions ==
In her lifetime, Rosalina Abejo composed over 400 works.

=== Orchestra ===
- Beatriz Symphony
- Gregoria Symphony (1950)
- Pioneer Symphony (1954)
- Thanatopsis Symphony (1956)
- Aeolian Piano Concerto (1956)
- Golden Foundation Piano Concerto (1959–1960)
- Guerilla Symphony (1971)
- The Trilogy of Man Symphony (1971)
- Dalawang Pusong Dakila Symphony (1975)
- Brotherhood Symphony, 1986,
- Jubilee Symphony, 1984,
- Symphony of Psalms, 1988,
- Symphony of Life, 1988,
- Symphony of Fortitude and Sudden Spring, 1989.
- Overture 1081
- 3 String Quartets
