= Vincent Miceli =

American philosopher

Vincent Peter Miceli, S.J. (1915 – June 2, 1991) was a Catholic priest, theologian, and philosopher.

Miceli was born in New York City, USA, in 1915, the ninth of ten children of Italian immigrants. While attending Cathedral High School and maintaining a 95.5 average he worked six days a week from 3-10pm delivering books. He entered the Society of Jesus in 1936 to pursue his studies and was ordained a priest in 1949. Fr Miceli received his STL from St Louis University in 1950 and his PhD from Fordham University in 1961. His doctoral dissertation was on the French Catholic existentialist, Gabriel Marcel.

Father Miceli is the author of several books: Ascent to Being (1961), The Gods of Atheism (1971), The Antichrist (1981), Women Priests and Other Fantasies (1985), The Roots of Violence (1989), and Rendezvous with God (1991).

Father Miceli also made appearances on the Good Morning America television show on ABC and the Crossfire show on CNN.

Father Miceli taught theology and philosophy at several universities including Gregorian University in Rome, Spring Hill College in Mobile, Alabama, Loyola University New Orleans, and Christendom College in Front Royal, Virginia. He left the Jesuit order in 1982, after some of his writings raised concerns with his superiors in the order, affiliating with the Diocese of Ponce, Puerto Rico.
