= Grete Kunz (painter) =

Czech painter

- Born: Margarete Frömelová; 28 March 1909; Libina, Moravia, Austria-Hungary
- Died: 5 June 1991 (aged 82); Wiesbaden, Germany
- Occupation: Painter

Margarete Kunzová-Friebelungová, known under the name Grete Kunz (28 March 1909 – 5 June 1991), was a Czech painter. Her work was part of the painting event in the art competition at the 1936 Summer Olympics.
