= Jacques Mitterrand =

French politician (1908–1991)

Jacques Mitterrand (10 June 1908 – 5 June 1991) was the Grand Master of the Grand Orient de France and a founder of the small left wing party Union progressiste.

Mitterrand was born in Bourges. He was a member of the Council of the French Union between 1947 and 1958.
