= ASL Airlines Spain =

Spanish cargo airline

IATA	ICAO	Call sign
PV	PNR	SKYJET
- Founded: 1987
- Commenced operations: December 1988
- Ceased operations: August 2018
- Hubs: Madrid–Barajas
- Secondary hubs: Barcelona–El Prat, Seville, Valencia, Vitoria, Zaragoza
- Fleet size: 8
- Parent company: ASL Aviation Group
- Headquarters: Madrid–Barajas Airport, Spain
- Website: aslairlines.es

ASL Airlines Spain, formerly PAN Air Líneas Aéreas S.A., was a cargo airline based at Madrid–Barajas International Airport, Spain. Its main hub was at Madrid–Barajas International Airport with small hubs at Barcelona–El Prat, Seville, Valencia, Vitoria and Zaragoza.

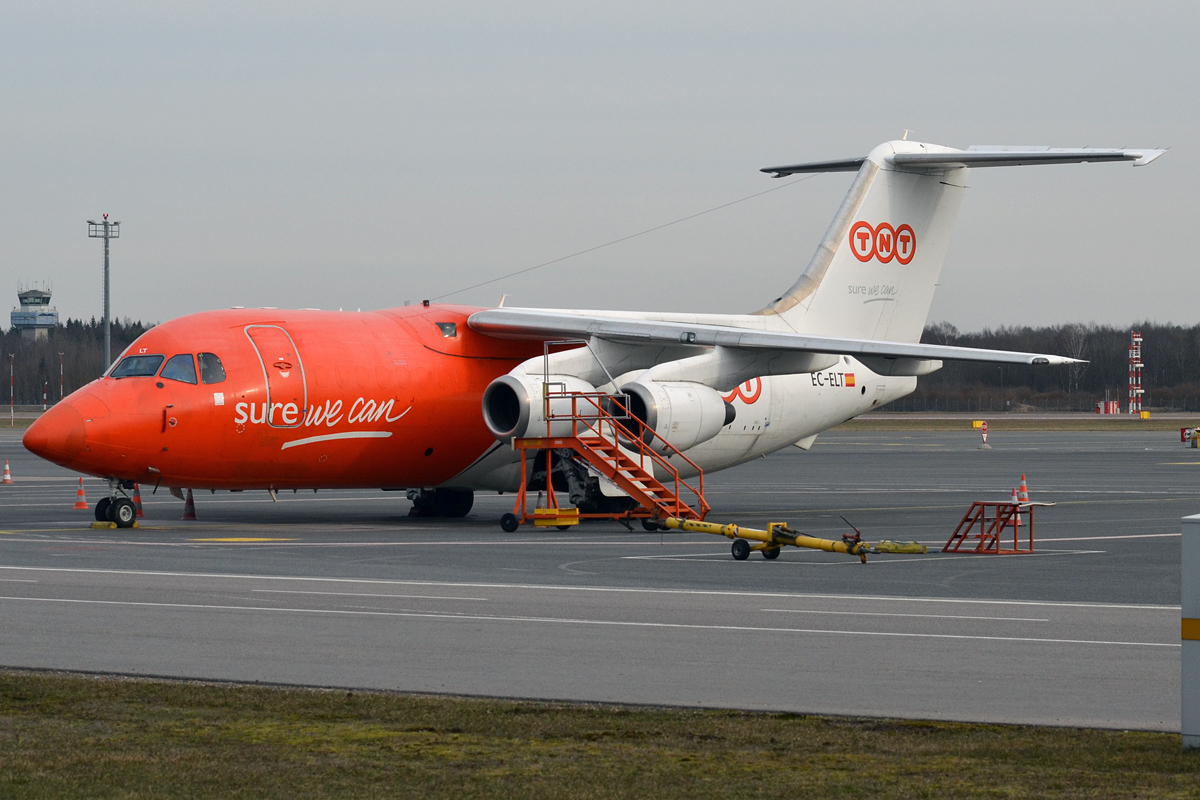
PAN Air BAe 146-200QT operated for TNT Express

The airline mainly operated on the TNT Express European Network. It also provided ad hoc charters.

== History ==
PAN Air was established in 1987 and started operations in December 1988. The airline was formerly owned by TNT Express Spain. On 5 February 2016 ASL Aviation Group announced it had agreed to purchase PAN Air on the condition that FedEx takes over TNT Express. PAN Air was later renamed ASL Airlines Spain.

ASL Airlines Spain ceased operations in August 2018.

== Fleet ==
The ASL Airlines Spain fleet consisted of the following aircraft (as of September 2016):

ASL Airlines Spain fleet
Aircraft	In service	Orders	Passengers	Notes
British Aerospace 146-300QT	8	—		
Total	8			

== See also ==
- ASL Airlines Belgium
- ASL Airlines France
- ASL Airlines Hungary
- ASL Airlines Ireland
- ASL Airlines Switzerland
