= ASL Airlines Ireland =

Irish cargo airline

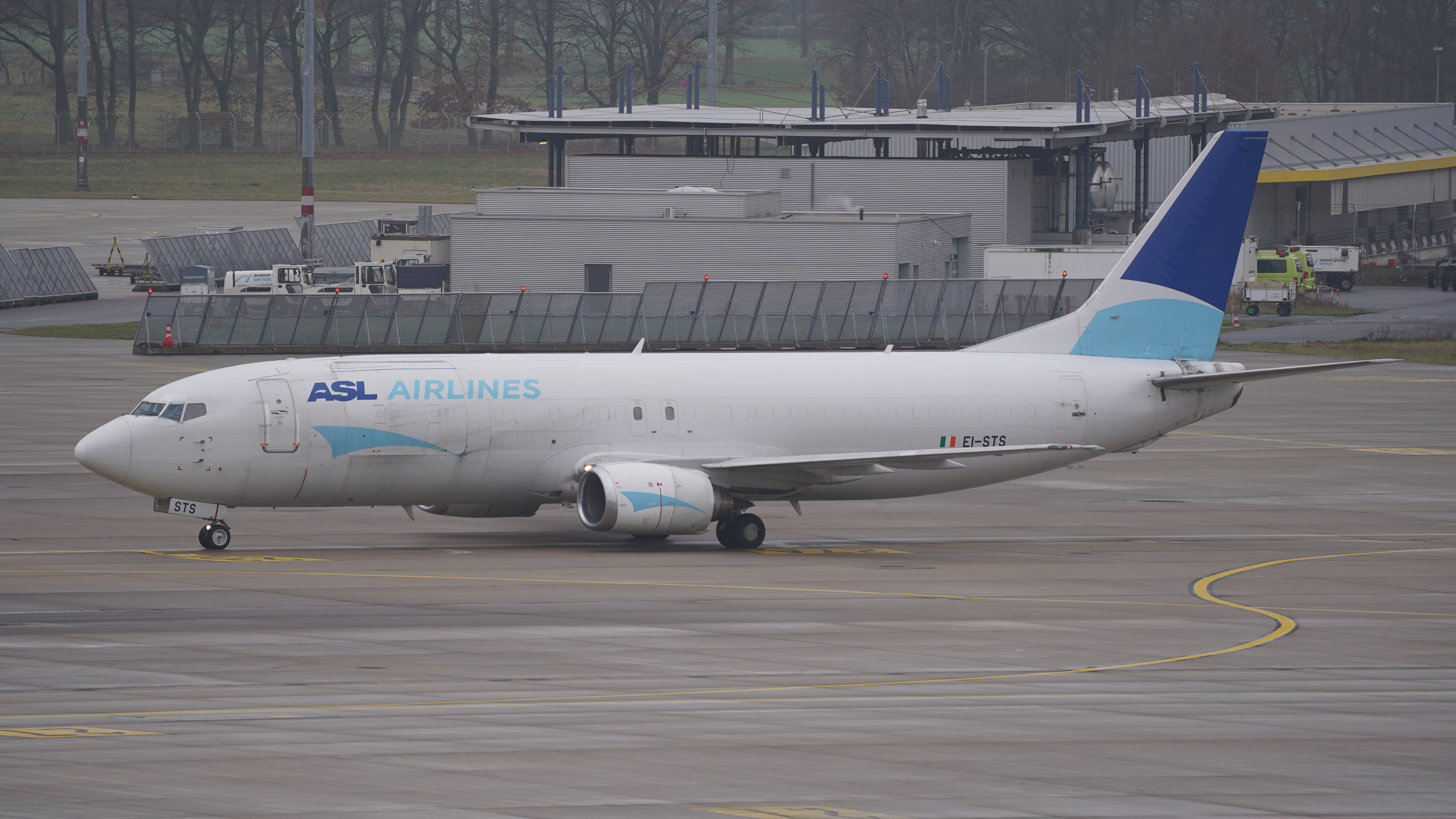
- ASLI 737-48E(SF) in standard livery
IATA	ICAO	Call sign
5H	ABR	CONTRACT
- Founded: 1972; 54 years ago
- Hubs: Dublin; East Midlands; Paris Charles de Gaulle; Shannon
- Fleet size: 40
- Parent company: ASL Aviation Holdings
- Headquarters: Swords, Dublin, Ireland
- Key people: John Rawl (Managing Director)
- Website: http://www.aslaviationholdings.com/asl-airlines-ireland/

ASL Airlines Ireland (ASLI), formerly Air Contractors, is a cargo airline with an extensive operations network. It operates scheduled freight services throughout Europe on behalf of major parcel integrators such as Amazon, FedEx Feeder and DHL Express; and some wet lease services for scheduled airlines. ASL Aviation Holdings, the parent company of ASL Airlines Ireland, is headquartered in Swords, County Dublin, Ireland.

== History ==
The airline was established and started operations in 1972, as Air Bridge Carriers at East Midlands Airport. In September 1992 the name Hunting Cargo Airlines was adopted and in 1997 the transfer of all airline operations to Ireland was completed. In June 1998 the Hunting Group sold its aviation arm to a joint consortium of CMB Compagnie Maritime Belge and Safair (part of the Imperial Group) and the airline was rebranded Air Contractors.

The Imperial Group transferred its 49% shareholding in the company to 3P Air Freighters/Petercam S.A. in 2007.

Former "Air Contractors" logo.

Air Contractors acquired French carrier Europe Airpost on 14 March 2008. Following the acquisition of EAP into the ACL group of companies, the group was rebranded ASL Aviation Group, representing the three core activities of the group; Airlines, Support and Leasing.

In 2010 Air Contractors entered a new era with the start of passenger flying on a Boeing 737-300 aircraft in conjunction with its Group partner, Europe Airpost.

On 4 June 2015, ASL Aviation Group announced that Air Contractors would be rebranded as ASL Airlines Ireland, Europe Airpost as ASL Airlines France, Farnair Hungary as ASL Airlines Hungary and Farnair Switzerland as ASL Airlines Switzerland.

The company announced on 5 February 2016 that it had agreed to buy TNT Airways and PAN Air, on the condition that FedEx's purchase of TNT goes ahead. The sale went through in May 2016. TNT Airways became ASL Airlines Belgium and Pan Air became ASL Airlines Spain. In early 2017, ASL Aviation Group rebranded as ASL Aviation Holdings.

Subsidiary ASL Airlines Switzerland ceased all operations on 1 February 2018, while ASL Airlines Spain ceased all operations in August of that same year.

== Destinations ==
ASLI maintains crew bases in 10 European countries and has its own maintenance hangar in Shannon, Ireland. The airline's operations span a network of more than 50 regular destinations across Europe, North America and Asia under its own brand name and on behalf of customers such as DHL, Amazon and FedEx.

== Fleet ==
=== Current fleet ===
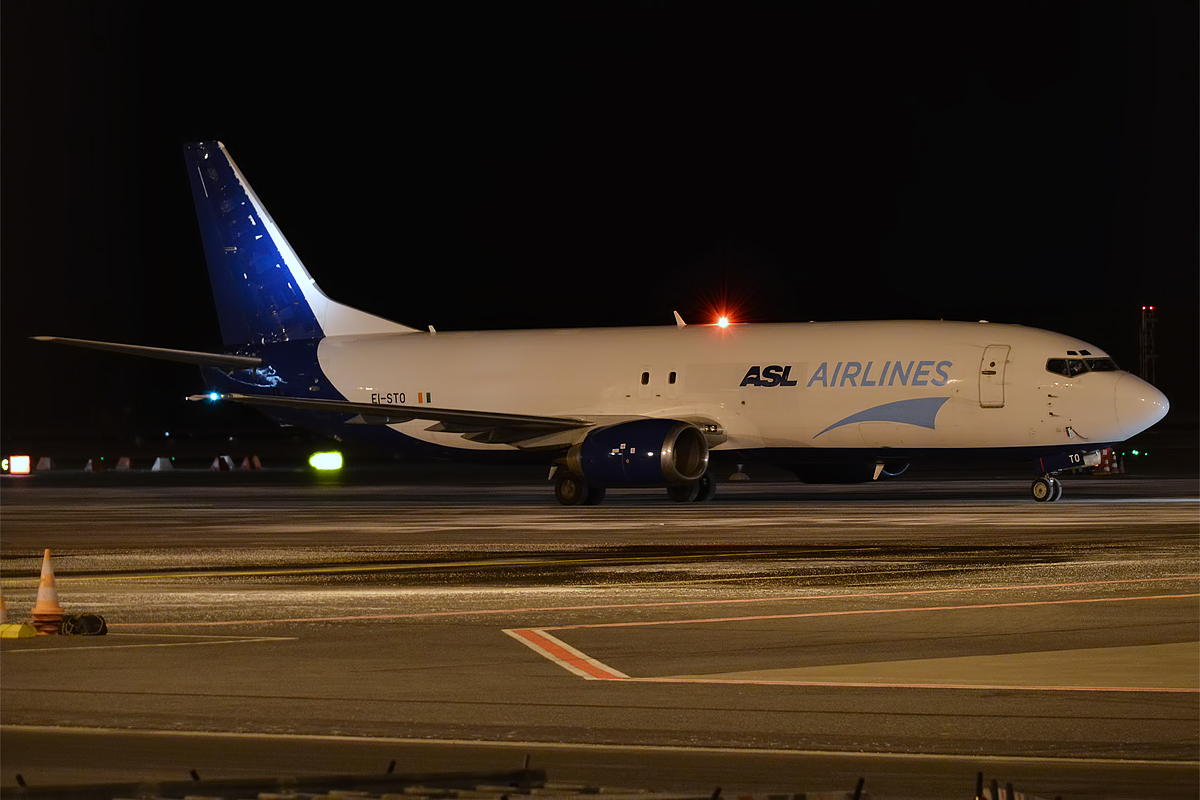
ASL Airlines Ireland Boeing 737-400F

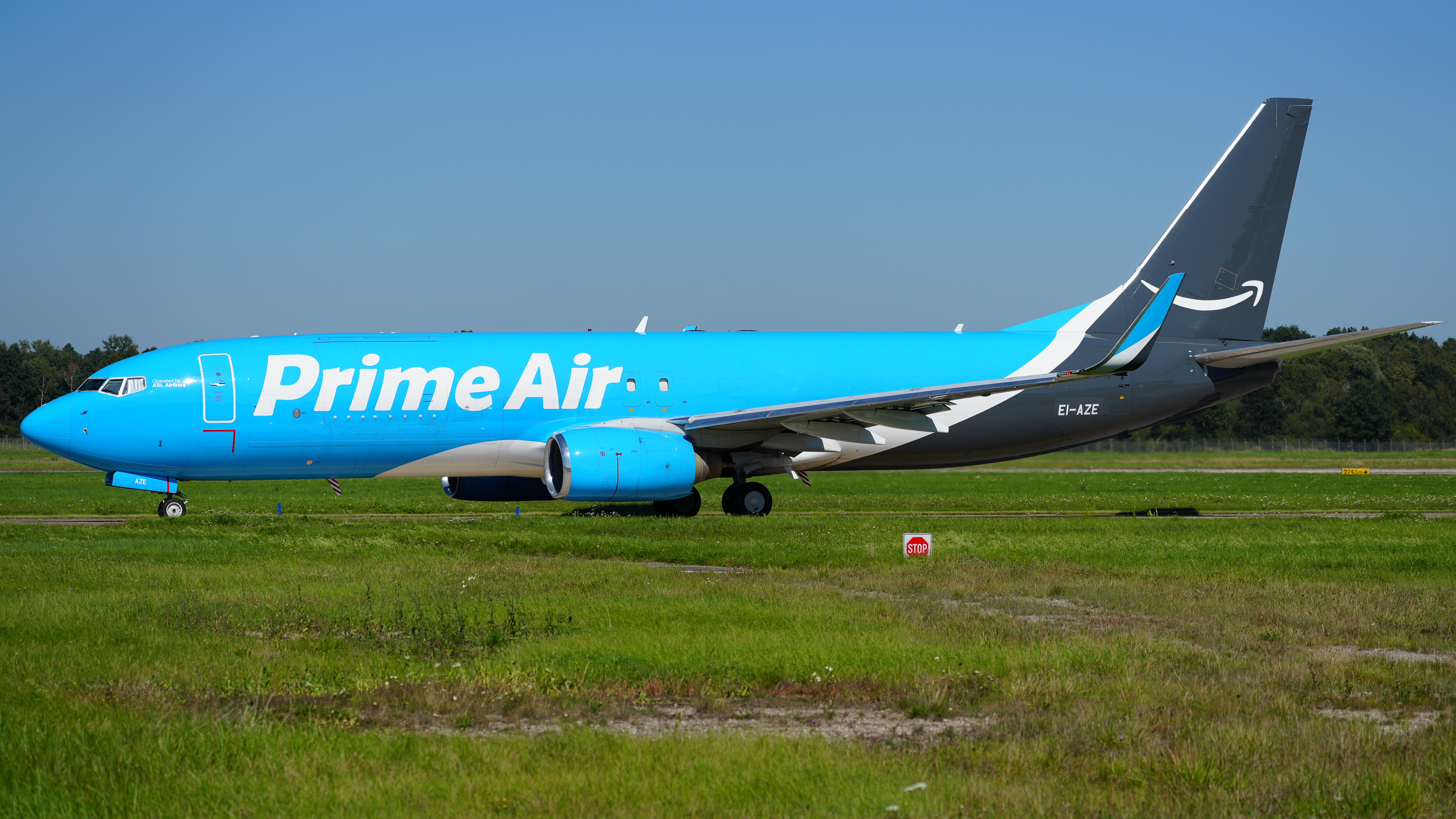
ASL Airlines Ireland Boeing 737-800(BCF) In Amazon Air livery

As of July 2026, ASL Airlines Ireland operates the following aircraft:

ASL Airlines Ireland fleet
Aircraft	In fleet	Orders	Notes
Airbus A300F	8	—	
Airbus A330-200P2F	2	—	
ATR 72-500F	1	—	
ATR 72-600F	9	—	
Boeing 737-400SF	1	—	
Boeing 737-800BCF	3	—	
Boeing 737-800BDSF	3	—	
Boeing 737-800SF	8	—	
Total	35	2	

=== Former fleet ===
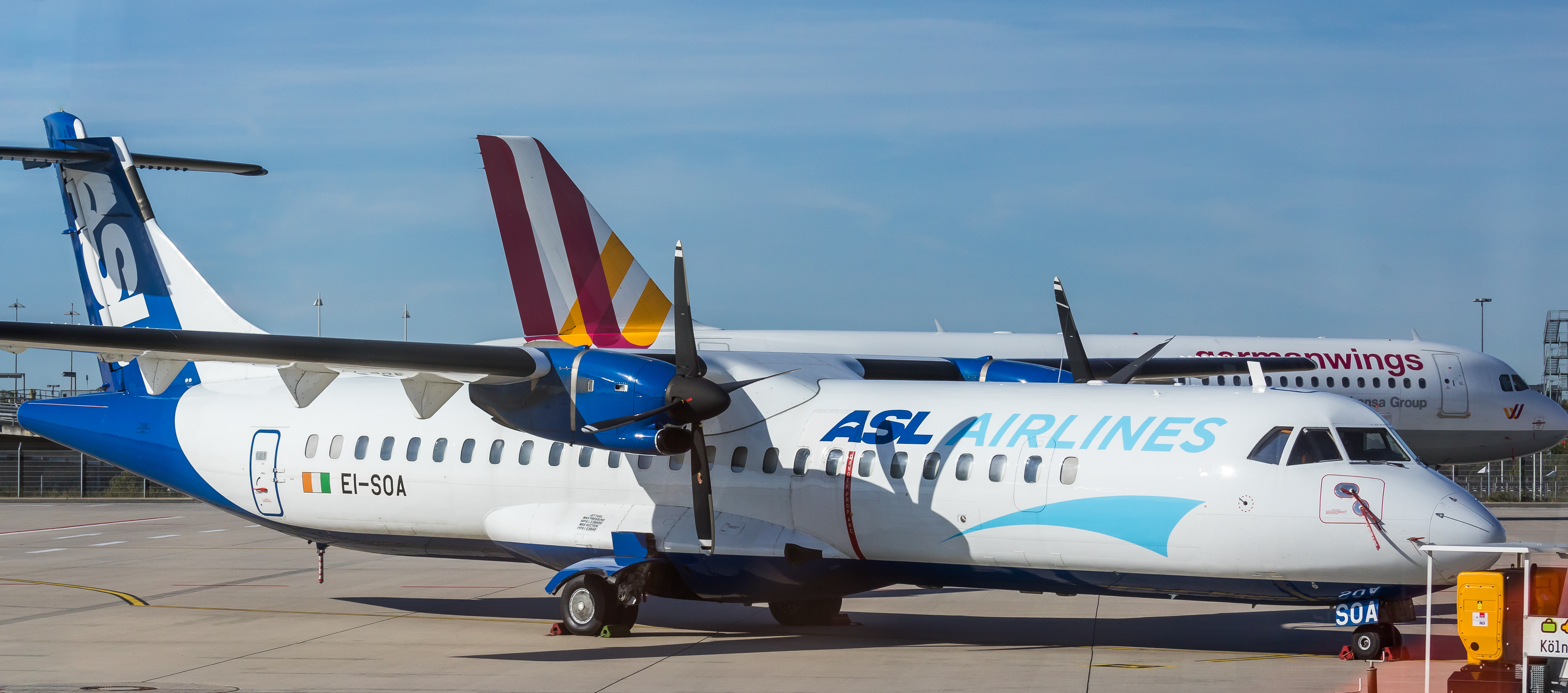
ASL Airlines Ireland ATR 72-200(F)

Aircraft that have been in the ASL Airlines Ireland fleet in the past.

ASL Airlines Ireland historic fleet
Aircraft	Notes
ATR 42-300(F)	Last aircraft was withdrawn in April 2021
ATR 72-200(F)	Last aircraft was withdrawn in October 2022
A330-300(F)	Last aircraft was withdrawnin April 2024
Boeing 737-300(F)	Last aircraft was withdrawn in October 2019
757-200	Last aircraft was withdrawn in June 2020

=== Fleet development ===
In June 2021, ASL Aviation Holdings announced an order with Boeing for up to 20 737-800 Boeing Converted Freighter (BCF) aircraft - 10 firm orders and 10 options at the Paris Air Show. This was extended to an additional 20 737-800 Boeing Converted Freighters (BCF) in March 2022. ASL's order, including options brings the number of 737-800BCF to 40 aircraft. Eleven aircraft operate for ASL Airlines Belgium, ASL Airlines France, ASL Airlines Ireland and ASL joint venture, K-Mile Asia. ASL Airline Ireland has taken delivery of 8 of these aircraft as of January 2025.
