= Farnair =

Farnair may refer to:

- Farnair Hungary, a Hungarian airline that operates scheduled express cargo services, ad hoc charter services and relief missions
- Farnair Switzerland, a Swiss airline that operates regular express parcel services, operations for humanitarian organisations, the oil industry and other special operations
