= ASL Aviation Holdings =

Aviation services group

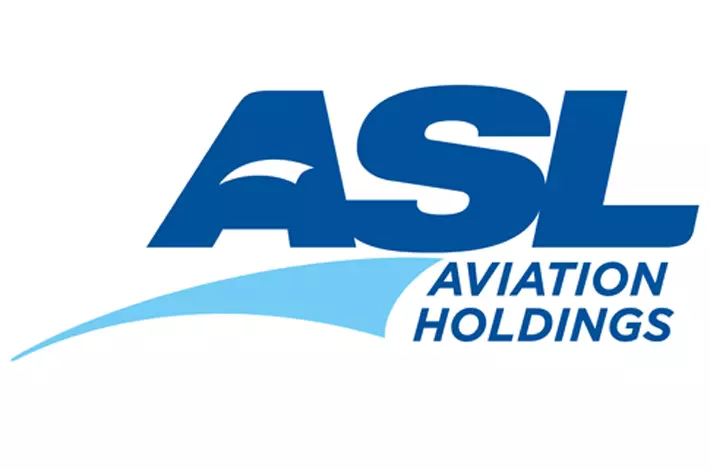
- Formerly: ASL Aviation Group
- Type: Designated activity company
- Industry: Aviation services
- Founded: 1970; 56 years ago
- Headquarters: Dublin, Ireland
- Number of locations: 26 Companies including aircraft leasing entities
- Area served: Worldwide
- Key people: Dave Andrew (Chief Executive); Colin Grant (chief operating officer); Mark O'Kelly (chief financial officer)
- Number of employees: 3,000
- Subsidiaries: ASL Airlines Australia; ASL Airlines Ireland; ASL Airlines Belgium; ASL Airlines France; ASL Airlines United Kingdom; ASL Maintenance; FlySafair; Safair; K-Mile Asia; Quikjet Airlines
- Website: https://www.aslaviationholdings.com/

ASL Aviation Holdings DAC (ASL), formerly the ASL Aviation Group, is an aviation services holding company focused on cargo and passenger airline operations, aircraft leasing and maintenance and aircraft parts support, based in Dublin, Ireland. Today, ASL has eight airlines in Europe, South Africa, Asia and Australia, consisting of ASL Airlines Ireland, ASL Airlines Belgium, ASL Airlines France, ASL Airlines United Kingdom in Europe, ASL Airlines Australia, formally Pionair Australia in Australia and joint venture and associate airlines FlySafair in South Africa, K-Mile Asia in Thailand and Quikjet Airlines in India.

ASL also has various aircraft maintenance and aircraft support companies – ASL Maintenance (formally X-air services), ASL Airlines Services Switzerland and ASL Airlines Hungary.

In 2022, the company reported a profit of €46.6 million in 2021 revenues of €1.13 billion.

== History ==
The group began with Safair Freighters, founded in South Africa in 1970, which with Safmarine acquired Tropair. Meanwhile, in the United Kingdom in 1972, Air Bridge Carriers was established. In September 1992, the company was renamed Hunting Cargo Airlines and in 1997, all airline operations were transferred to Ireland. In 1994, Safair Freighters was renamed Safair and as a result of the Hunting Group's sale of its aviation-related companies in June 1998 to the joint consortium of Compagnie Maritime Belge/Safair (party of the Imperial Group), the airline was rebranded the company as Air Contractors.

The Imperial Group transferred its shares in the company to 3P Air Freighters in 2007. Air Contractors acquired French carrier Europe Airpost on 14 March 2008. Following the acquisition of EAP into the ASL group of companies, the group was rebranded ASL Aviation Group, representing the three core activities of the group; Airlines, Support and Leasing.

In 2010, the acquisition of the Safair Group was finalised and in 2013 Safair introduced a broad-based black economic empowerment programme, allowing ASL to retain a minority share in the company.

Low-cost airline FlySafair was established by Safair in 2013. On 4 December 2014, the company acquired the Farnair Group in Switzerland.

On 4 June 2015, ASL Aviation Group announced that Air Contractors would be rebranded as ASL Airlines Ireland, Europe Airpost as ASL Airlines France, Farnair Hungary as ASL Airlines Hungary and Farnair Switzerland as ASL Airlines Switzerland.

The company acquired TNT Airways and PAN Air on 12 February 2016 and became ASL Airlines Belgium and ASL Airlines Spain.

In 2017, ASL Aviation Group was renamed ASL Aviation Holdings. ASL Airlines Switzerland ceased airline operations on 1 February 2018, while ASL Airlines Spain ceased all operations in August 2018.

On 4 June 2019, STAR Capital Partnership became the 100% shareholder in the company. In 2021, ASL Airlines United Kingdom was launched.

In 2021, the company reported profits of €43.6m after tax and revenue of €1,131.5m with cash reserves increasing to 46.3% year on year to €192.2m.

ASL acquired 100% ownership of ASL Maintenance (formally X-air services) on 9 August 2022. The company was previously jointly owned on a fifty-fifty basis by ASL and Sabena technics.

In December 2022, the company re-launched joint-venture airline Quikjet Airlines with the renewal of a new air operators certificate and the delivery of its first Boeing 737-800BCF. On 9 January 2023, Quikjet relaunched operations in India with a second Boeing 737-800BCF operating on behalf of Amazon Air.

On 4 March 2023, the company acquired Australian airline Pionair and rebranded it ASL Airlines Australia.

== Operations ==
ASL Airlines operates ACMI services on charter cargo transport services on behalf of express integrators and online retailers such as FedEx Express, Amazon Air, UPS and DHL. ASL aircraft operate scheduled and charter cargo services under the brand ASL Airlines on routes in Europe, Asia, the Middle East, North America and Africa. These include ASL Airlines Belgium, ASL Airlines France, ASL Airlines Ireland, ASL Airlines United Kingdom, ASL Airlines Australia, K-Mile Asia, and Safair.

ASL Airlines France and FlySafair are the company's scheduled passenger services, based in Europe and South Africa respectively.

ASL has a leasing division, focusing cargo aircraft leasing and sales options to operators.

The company has two maintenance and aircraft parts support subsidiaries, ASL Maintenance and ASL Airlines Services Switzerland

== Fleet ==
The company has a global fleet of 152 aircraft. As of July 2024, the fleet consists of:

ASL Airlines Fleet – July 2024
Aircraft	Type	In fleet	Operated by
ATR 72–500	Freighter	3	ASL Airlines Ireland
ATR 72–600	Freighter	9	ASL Airlines Ireland
Airbus A300-600	Freighter	6	ASL Airlines Ireland
Boeing 737-300	Passenger	1	Safair
Boeing 737-300QC	Passenger/Freighter (Quick Change)	2	ASL Airlines France
Boeing 737-400	Passenger	5	FlySafair
Boeing 737-400C	Passenger & Freighter (Combi)	1	Safair
Boeing 737-400SF	Freighter	27	ASL Airlines Ireland, ASL Airlines France, K-Mile Air, ASL Airlines Belgium
Boeing 737-700	Passenger	1	ASL Airlines France
Boeing 737-800	Passenger	32	ASL Airlines France, FlySafair
Boeing 737-800SF	Freighter	47	ASL Airlines Ireland, ASL Airlines Belgium, ASL Airlines France, ASL Airlines United Kingdom, K-Mile Air, Pionair Australia, Quikjet Airlines
Boeing 747-400F, 400ERF	Freighter	5	ASL Airlines Belgium
Bae 146-200/RJ85, Bae 146-300/RJ100	Passenger & Freighter	10	Pionair Australia
Embraer 190-E2	Passenger	1	Pionair Australia
