= ASL Airlines Australia =

Australian airline

IATA	ICAO	Call sign
PH	PHA	PARSEC
- Founded: 1991; 35 years ago
- AOC #: CASA.AOC.0028
- Hubs: Adelaide; Brisbane; Cairns; Sydney
- Focus cities: Auckland; Christchurch; Melbourne
- Subsidiaries: Airwork
- Fleet size: 10
- Parent company: ASL Aviation Holdings
- Headquarters: Bankstown Airport
- Key people: Stefan Oechsner, CEO and managing director
- Employees: 150 (2024)
- Website: aslairlines.com.au

ASL Airlines Australia, formerly Pionair, is an Australian charter and cargo airline based at Bankstown Airport in Sydney. It is a subsidiary of ASL Aviation Holdings.

== History ==
Pionair was founded in 1991 in Queenstown, New Zealand as a sightseeing company with a restored Douglas DC-3. A further two followed. In 1998, Pionair expanded into the Australian market.

In 2003, it purchased a Convair 580. It diversified into fly-in fly-out work with contracts for the Thiess Sedgman joint venture in Queensland and Fortescue in Western Australia. Freight operations commenced in 2007 for Toll Priority with a converted passenger Convair 580, with two more purchased in 2008.

Since 2016, Pionair operated cargo aircraft for FedEx / TNT, initially under contract to Virgin Australia and since March 2020 to Qantas Freight.

In April 2023, ASL Aviation Holdings acquired Pionair and rebranded it ASL Airlines Australia.

In 2026, ASL Airlines Australia entered a conditional sale and purchase agreement (SPA) to acquire Airwork. No deal has yet been confirmed.

== Fleet ==
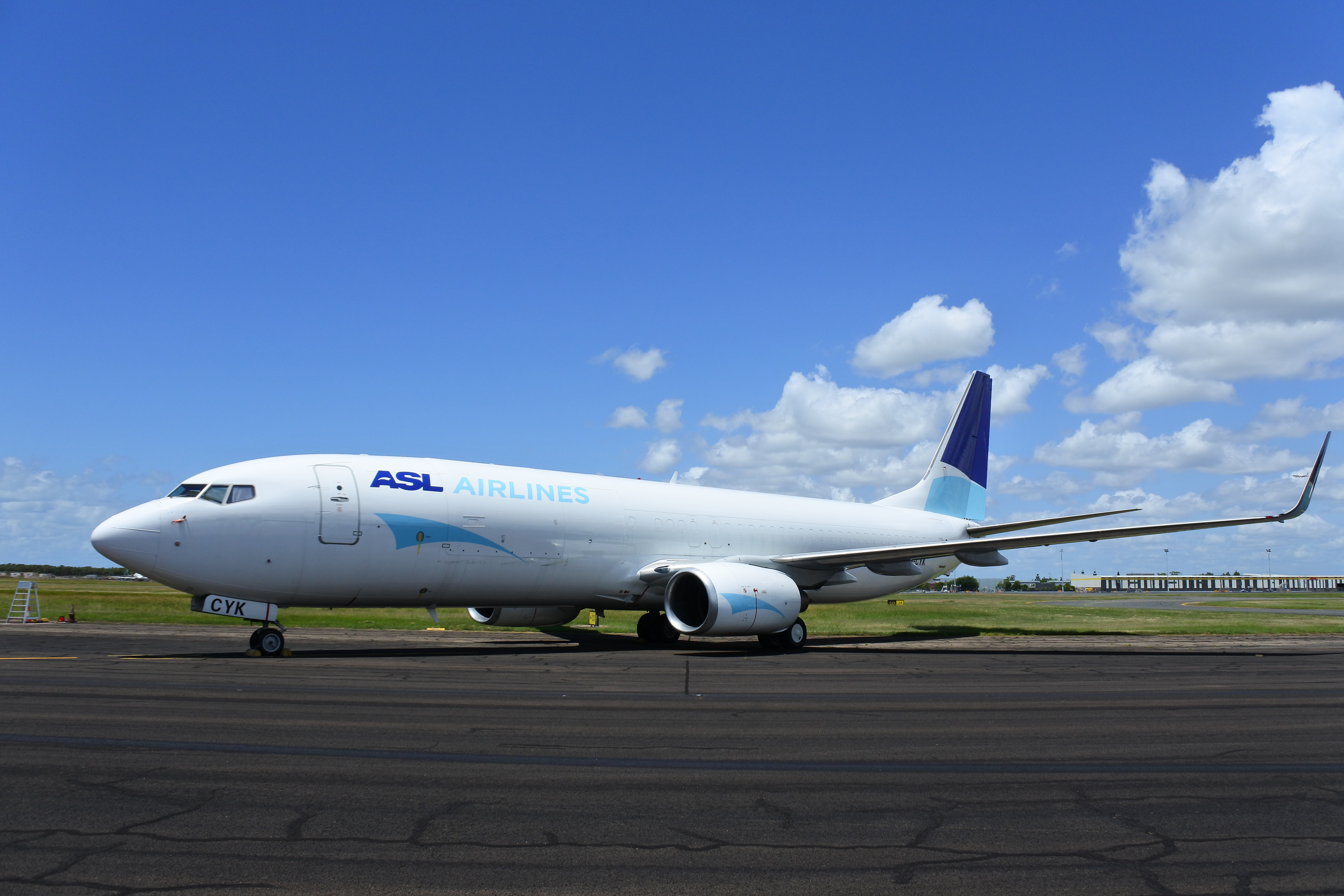
ASL Australia Boeing 737-800BCF registration VH-CYK at Brisbane Airport

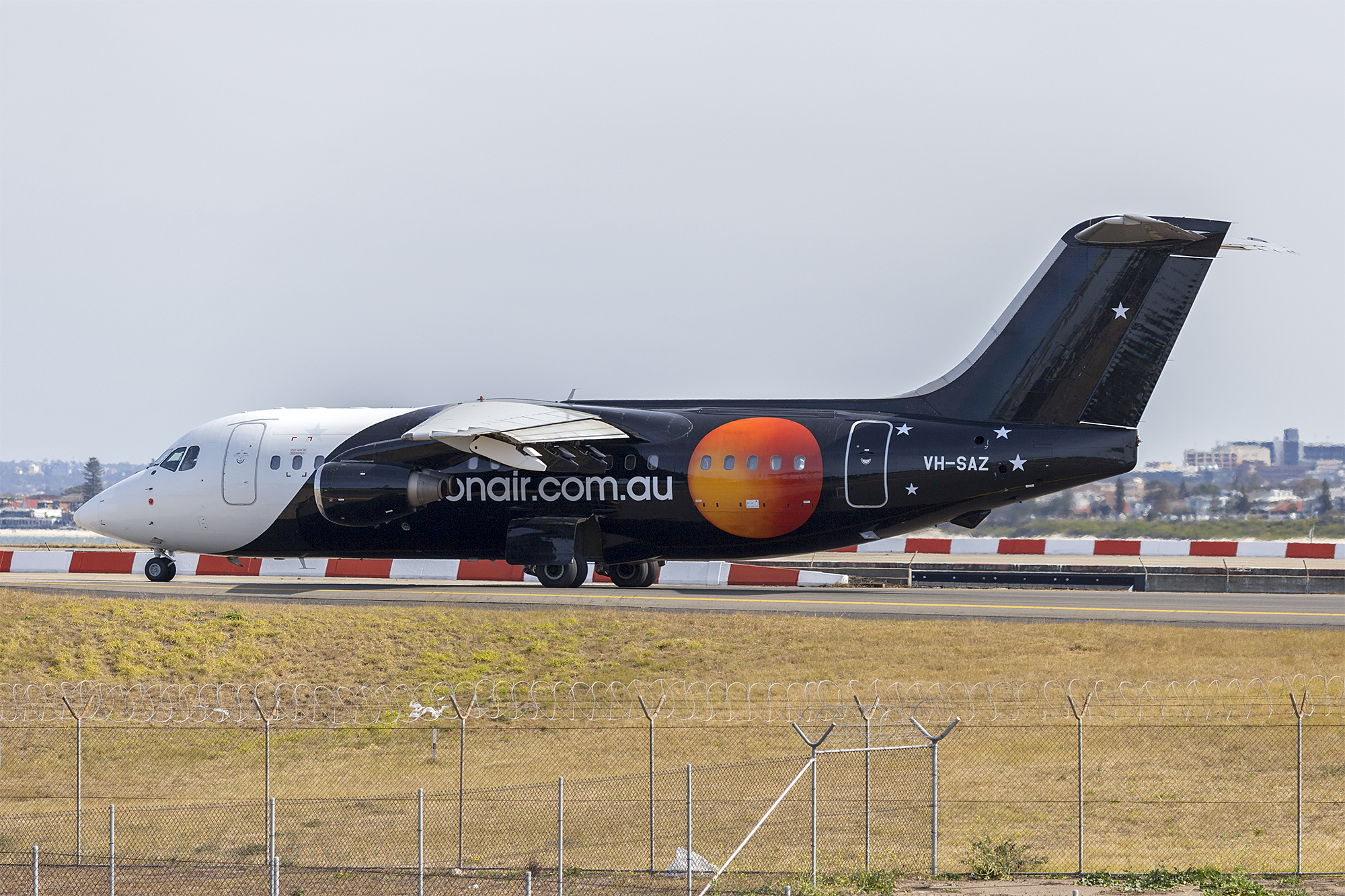
ASL British Aerospace 146 at Sydney Airport

The ASL Australia fleet consists of the following aircraft:

Aircraft	In service	On order	Notes
British Aerospace 146-200	2	—	Stored.
British Aerospace 146-200(QT)	3	—	One stored.
British Aerospace 146-300(QT)	3	—	
Boeing 737-800BCF	2	—	
Total	10	—	

=== Fleet development ===
The first of two Embraer E190-E2 aircraft were delivered in January 2020 for operations on behalf of Air Kiribati, scheduled to start in mid-2020 but the agreement was cancelled due to the COVID-19 pandemic, with the other aircraft not being taken up. One used Embraer E190 had been purchased by Pionair and was delivered in November 2020 for company growth and expansion, however this was later sold to Alliance Airlines to allow the company to focus on the E190-E2.

In May and June 2022, Pionair acquired VH-IJZ and VH-HZU, two former Royal Air Force British Aerospace BAe 146 transports. After ASL's acquisition of Pionair, these airframes were transferred the Ghanaian Register; VH-HJZ now 9G-LEE while VH-IJZ's registration is unknown. Both aircraft are stored awaiting delivery to a publicly unknown airline. The airline received a Boeing 737-800BCF in February 2024. VH-CYK is the first 737 Boeing Converted Freighter (BCF) certified to operate in Australia.

A second Boeing 737-800BCF arrived in Australia in August 2025. VH-RAN and VH-CYK started operating regular scheduled cargo flights on behalf of FedEx in September 2025.

As of September 2026, ASL operates four British Aerospace 146 aircraft, and two Boeing 737-800BCF, all are freighters.
