= TNT Limited =

TNT Limited may refer to:

- Thomas Nationwide Transport, Australian logistics operator that traded as TNT Limited between 1986 and 1996
- Legal entity behind TNT Express in the United Kingdom
