= ASL Airlines Belgium =

Belgian cargo airline

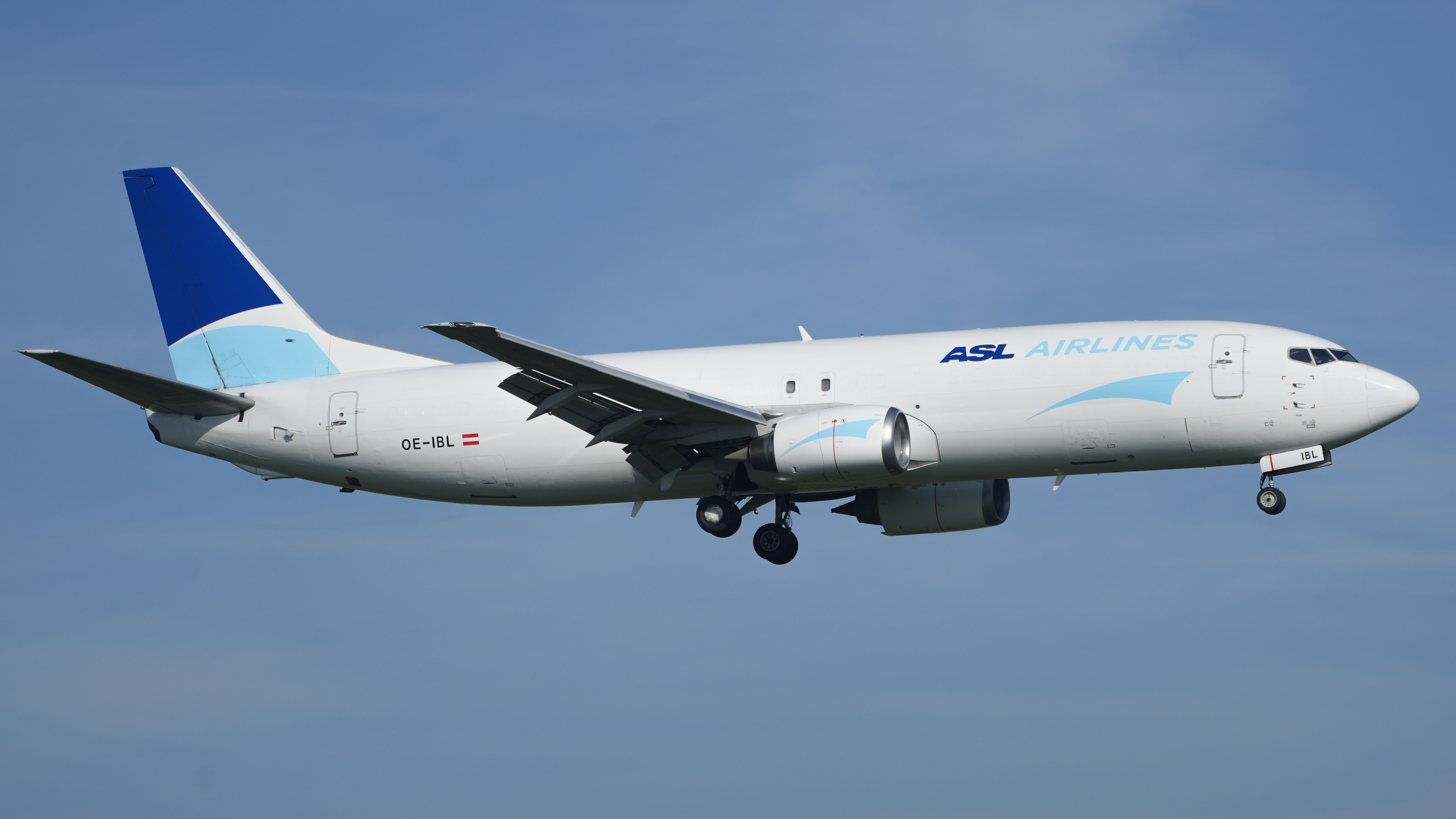
- 737-490(SF)
IATA	ICAO	Call sign
3V	TAY	QUALITY
- Founded: 1999
- Hubs: Liège Airport, Paris Charles De Gaulle
- Fleet size: 35
- Destinations: 6 (not including contracted charters)
- Parent company: ASL Aviation Holdings
- Headquarters: Liège, Belgium
- Key people: Rinesh Ramissoon, CEO
- Website: http://www.aslaviationholdings.com/

ASL Airlines Belgium, (ASLB) formerly TNT Airways, is a Belgian cargo airline operating chartered flights mainly to European destinations. It has its head office and hub on the grounds of Liège Airport. The airline was originally a subsidiary of TNT Express but was acquired by ASL Aviation Holdings and rebranded in 2016. ASL Aviation Holdings DAC, the parent company of ASL Airlines Belgium, is headquartered in Swords, County Dublin, Ireland.

ASLB operates worldwide Boeing 737 freighter services under the ASL Aviation Holdings brand and for major express integrator and e-commerce customers including FedEx and Alibaba. In addition to its own fleet, the airline also manages various third-party airlines providing aircraft for FedEx's European network.

== History ==
TNT Express was established in Australia in 1947 by Ken Thomas. The company expanded from a single truck to road and rail freight services across Australia including, for the first time, new overnight services. In 1958, the company became known as Thomas Nationwide Transport or TNT for short and, by 1961, TNT was listed on the Australian Securities Exchange.

The company was founded in 1999 as TNT Airways S.A. Air freight operations began from Liège Airport. TNT Airways started flying with BAe 146-300 and Airbus A300. This transformation brought the company to an extension from a European to a Worldwide coverage. The Group introduced their first Boeing 737-300 in 2003.

In May 2004, TNT Post Group (TPG) announced major expansion of the TNT Express European air hub in Liège, Belgium. To consolidate and improve recognition of the TNT brand, the name 'TPG' was dropped in favor of 'TNT' in 2005.

The split-up of TNT N.V. which was announced in December 2010, materialized in May 2011 when TNT Express and TNT Post (now: PostNL) were separately listed on the Amsterdam Stock Exchange.

In May 2016, ASL Aviation Holdings acquired TNT Airways, joining the ASL portfolio of nine other airlines in Europe, South Africa and Asia. Rebranded ASL Airlines Belgium, the airline signed a multi-year service agreement with the new Fedex/TNT combination.

== Destinations ==
As of November 2021, ASL Airlines Belgium serves six scheduled destinations in North America and China under its own brand name with several dozen more operated as contracted charters, e. g. on behalf of DHL.

== Fleet ==
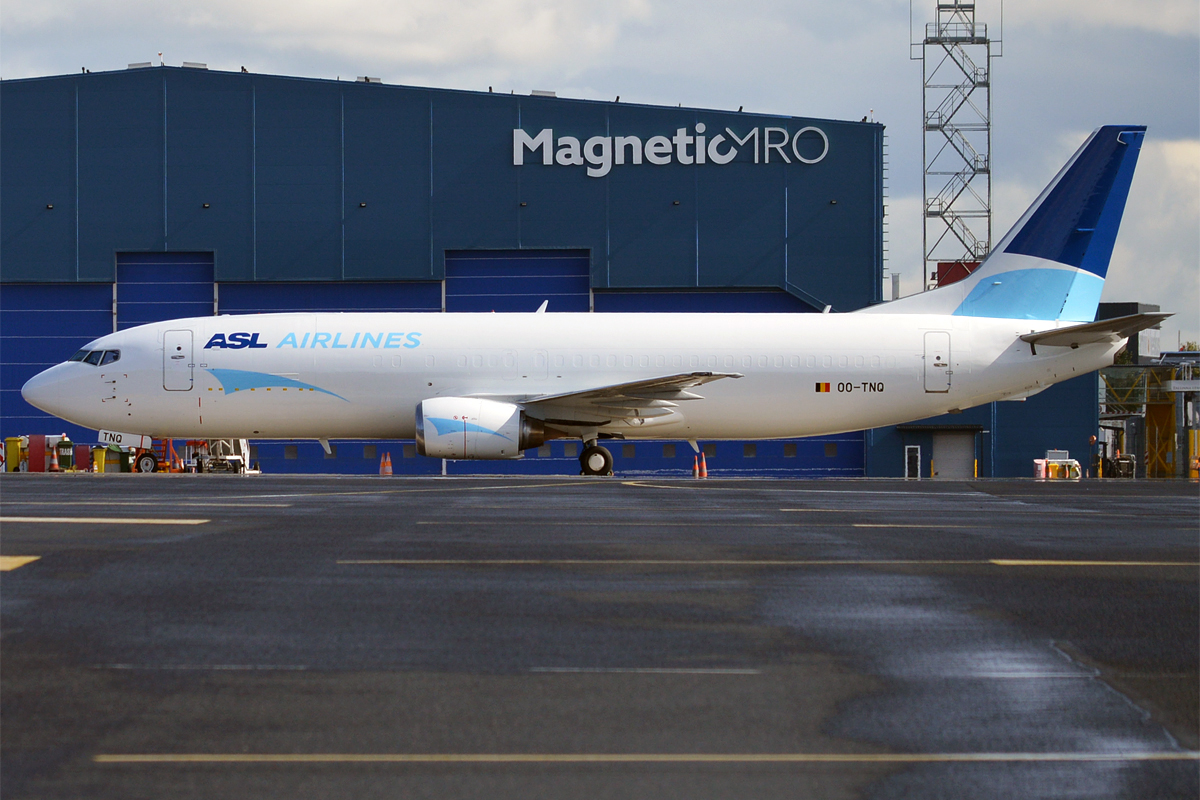
Boeing 737-400F

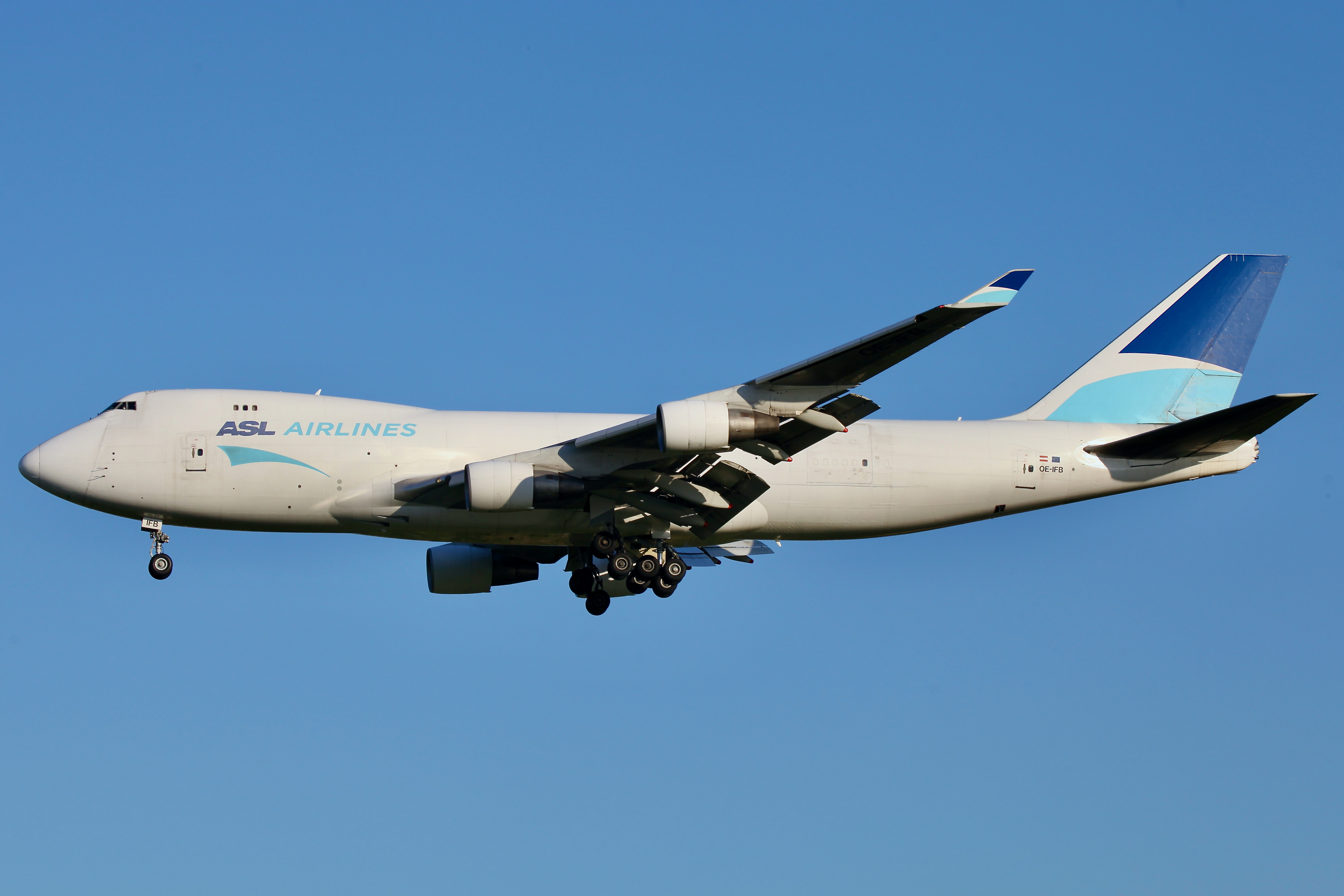
Boeing 747-400ERF

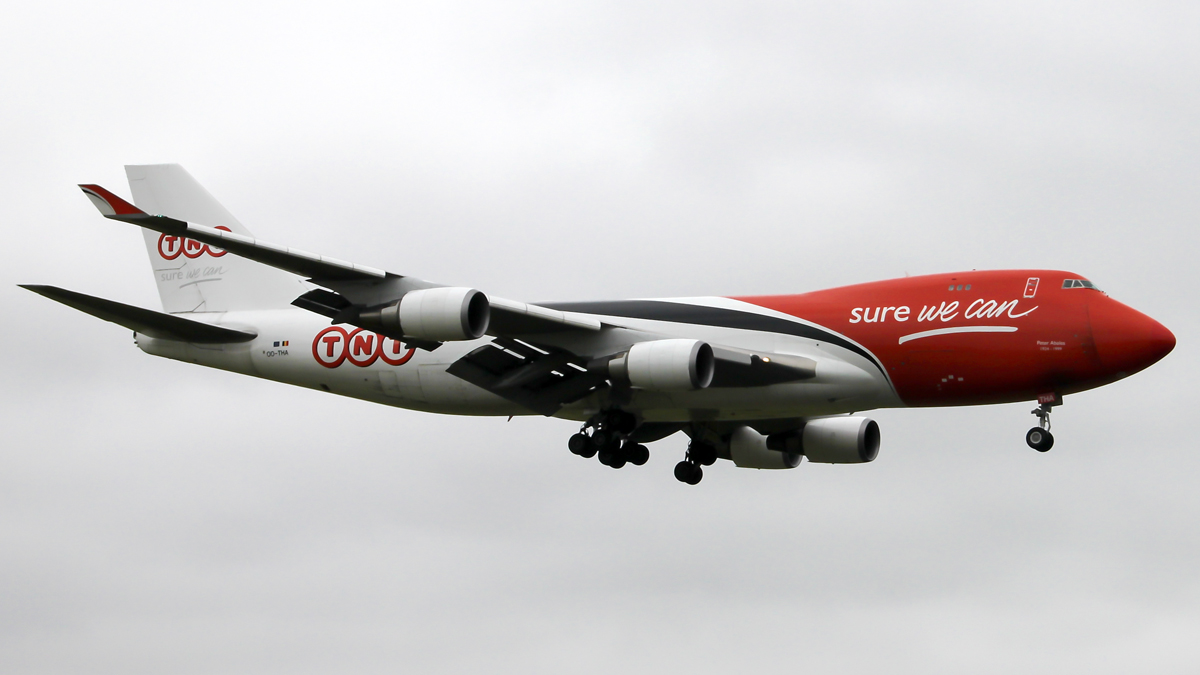
Boeing 747-400F in TNT Airways livery (now operating for ASL Airlines Belgium)

As of October 2025, ASL Airlines Belgium operates the following aircraft:

=== Current fleet ===
ASL Airlines Belgium fleet
Aircraft	In service	Orders	Notes
Boeing 737-400SF	5	—	
Boeing 737-800BCF	24	—	
Boeing 747-400ERF	2	—	
Boeing 747-400F	3	—	
Total	34	—	

=== Retired Fleet ===
ASL Airlines Belgium's retired fleets
Aircraft	Fleets	Introduced	Retired
Boeing 737-300BDSF	2	2016	2018
Boeing 737-400BDSF	6	2016	2023
Boeing 737-400SF	6	2016	2021
Boeing 747-400ERF	4	2016	2019
Boeing 757-200PF	2	2016	2022
Boeing 757-200SF	1	2020	2022
Boeing 777F	3	2016	2017

In June 2021, ASL Aviation Holdings announced it had ordered up to 20 737-800 Boeing Converted Freighter (BCF) aircraft - 10 firm orders and 10 options at the Paris Air Show. This was extended to an additional 20 737-800 Boeing Converted Freighters (BCF) in March 2022. ASL's order, including options brings the number of 737-800BCF to 40 aircraft. Eleven aircraft operate for ASL Airlines Belgium, ASL Airlines France, ASL Airlines Ireland and ASL's joint venture airline, K-Mile Asia.

== Accidents and incidents ==
- On 15 June 2006, TNT Airways Flight 325N, a Boeing 737-300 cargo aircraft operating a flight from Liège Airport to Stansted Airport diverted to East Midlands Airport due to poor visibility, after holding for 30 minutes. On final approach, an inappropriately timed company message was transmitted by ATC to the aircraft. The autopilot was then inadvertently disengaged for a short period by the pilot attempting to respond to the transmission. The aircraft touched down on the grass to the left of the runway, resulting in the right main landing gear being detached and the right wing tip and engine scraping the ground. The flight crew managed to lift off again and subsequently made an emergency diversion to Birmingham Airport, where a landing was performed on the nose and left main landing gear, during which the aircraft scraped its nose and right engine. There were no injuries, but thousands of passengers had to be moved to other airports. The cause of the incident was determined to be an inappropriately timed message from ATC, the pilot inadvertently disconnecting the autopilot and subsequently losing situational awareness during the approach, the failure of the crew to make the required decision to go-around after the disconnection of the autopilot, and the co-pilot not calling "go-around" until after impact with the ground. The flight crewmembers were said by the airline to have managed the situation with skill once the error had been detected, but were dismissed from service with the company as a result of the incident.
