= List of airline codes (Q) =

This is a list of all airline codes. The table lists the IATA airline designators, the ICAO airline designators and the airline call signs (telephony designator). Historical assignments are also included for completeness.

== Codes ==
Airline codes
IATA	ICAO	Airline	Call sign	Country	Comments
	FQA	Quikjet Airlines	QUIK LIFT	India	2014
	QQE	Qatar Executive	QREX	Qatar	
	QNT	Qanot Sharq	QANAT SHARQ	Uzbekistan	
QF	QFA	Qantas	QANTAS	Australia	
QF	QLK	QantasLink	QLINK	Australia	
	QAC	Qatar Air Cargo	QATAR CARGO	Qatar	
QR	QTR	Qatar Airways	QATARI	Qatar	
	QAF	Qatar Amiri Flight	AMIRI	Qatar	
QB	QSM	Qeshm Air	QESHM AIR	Iran	
QW	QDA	Qingdao Airlines	SKY LEGEND	China	
	QTX	Quantex Environmental	AIR QUANTEX	Canada	
	QUE	Quebec Government Air Service	QUEBEC	Canada	
	QNA	Queen Air	QUEEN AIR	Dominican Republic	
	LBQ	Quest Diagnostics	LABQUEST	United States	
	QAJ	Quick Air Jet Charter	DAGOBERT	Germany	
	QAH	Quick Airways Holland	QUICK	Netherlands	
	QAS	Quisqueya Airlines	QUISQUEYA	Haiti	
	QAQ	Qurinea Air Service	QURINEA AIR	Libya	
	QCC	Qwest Commuter Corporation	QWEST AIR	United States	
	QWA	Qwestair		Australia	
	QWL	Qwila Air	Q-CHARTER	South Africa	

== IATA Traffic Conference Areas ==
The International Air Transport Association (IATA) divides the world into three areas called the Traffic Conference Areas (TCAs) for air travel purposes. These areas are used to define geographical boundaries for fare construction and other industry-related practices:

- Traffic Conference Area 1 (TC1) – this area includes the Americas, encompassing North America (the Caribbean, Central America, and Northern America) and South America.
- Traffic Conference Area 2 (TC2) – this area includes the EMEA region, encompassing Europe, the Middle East, and Africa (North Africa and Sub-Saharan Africa).
- Traffic Conference Area 3 (TC3) – this area includes the Asia–Pacific region, encompassing the rest of Asia (Central Asia, East Asia, North Asia, South Asia, and Southeast Asia) and Oceania.

Essentially, TC1 covers the "New World", while TC2 and TC3 together cover the "Old World" (Africa-Eurasia) and the "Land Down Under".

== See also ==
- IATA airport code
- ICAO airport code
