= ASL Airlines Hungary Flight 7332 =

2016 aviation accident in Italy

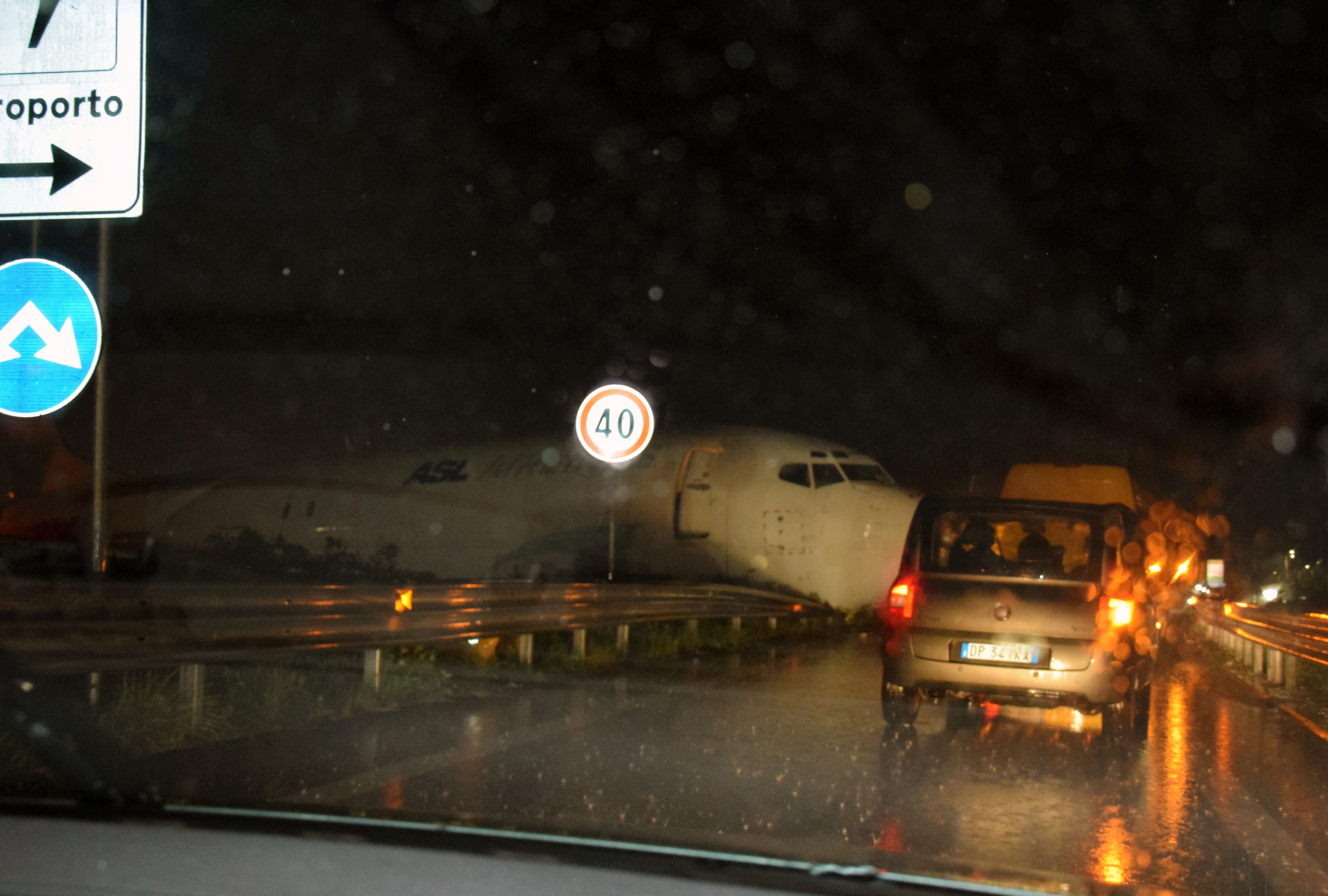
- The aircraft lying in the road after overrunning the runway

Accident
- Date: 5 August 2016
- Summary: Runway excursion due to pilot error
- Site: Bergamo Airport, Bergamo, Italy; 45.6717°N 9.6857°E

Aircraft
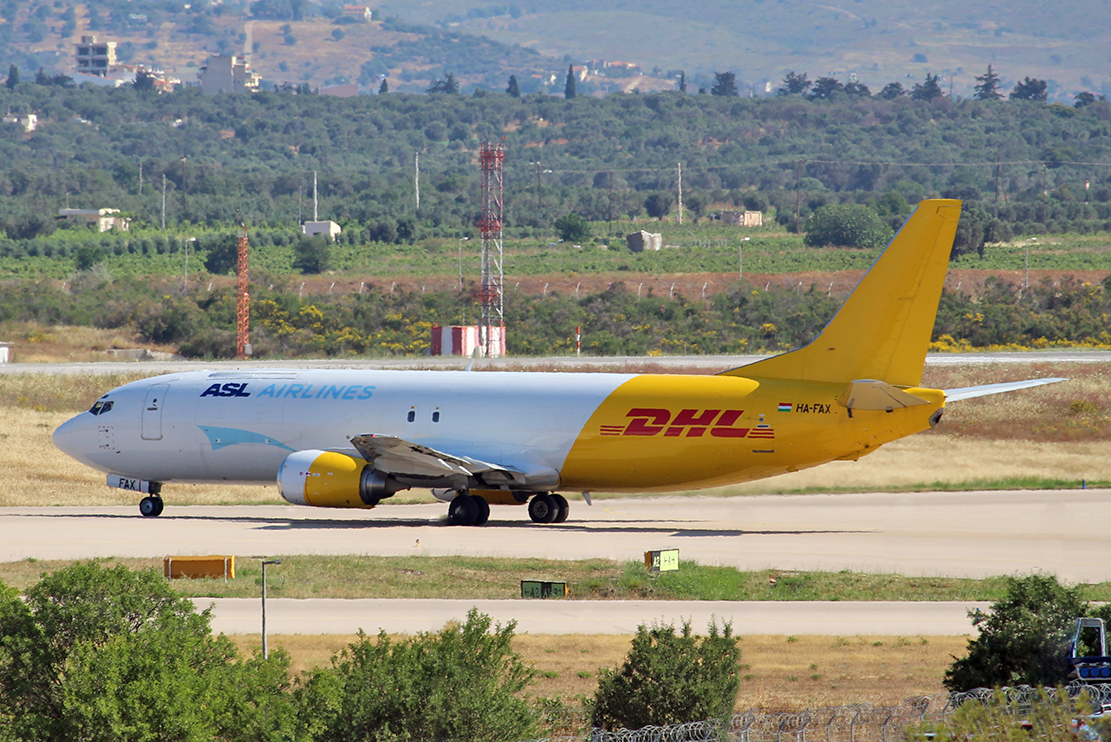
- HA-FAX, the aircraft involved in the accident, pictured in May 2016
- Aircraft type: Boeing 737-476SF
- Operator: European Air Transport on behalf of ASL Airlines Hungary
- IATA flight No.: QY7332
- ICAO flight No.: BCS7332
- Call sign: EUROTRANS 7332
- Registration: HA-FAX
- Flight origin: Charles de Gaulle Airport, Paris, France
- Destination: Orio al Serio International Airport, Bergamo, Italy
- Occupants: 2
- Crew: 2
- Fatalities: 0
- Injuries: 2
- Survivors: 2

ASL Airlines Hungary Flight 7332 was a cargo flight operating for DHL from Paris–Charles de Gaulle Airport, France, to Bergamo Orio al Serio Airport, Italy. On 5 August 2016, the Boeing 737-400 overran the runway while landing at Bergamo in poor weather, and came to rest on a nearby road. The airport was closed for almost three hours after the crash, and flights were rescheduled or rerouted to Malpensa Airport. The two-person crew suffered serious injuries.

== Accident ==
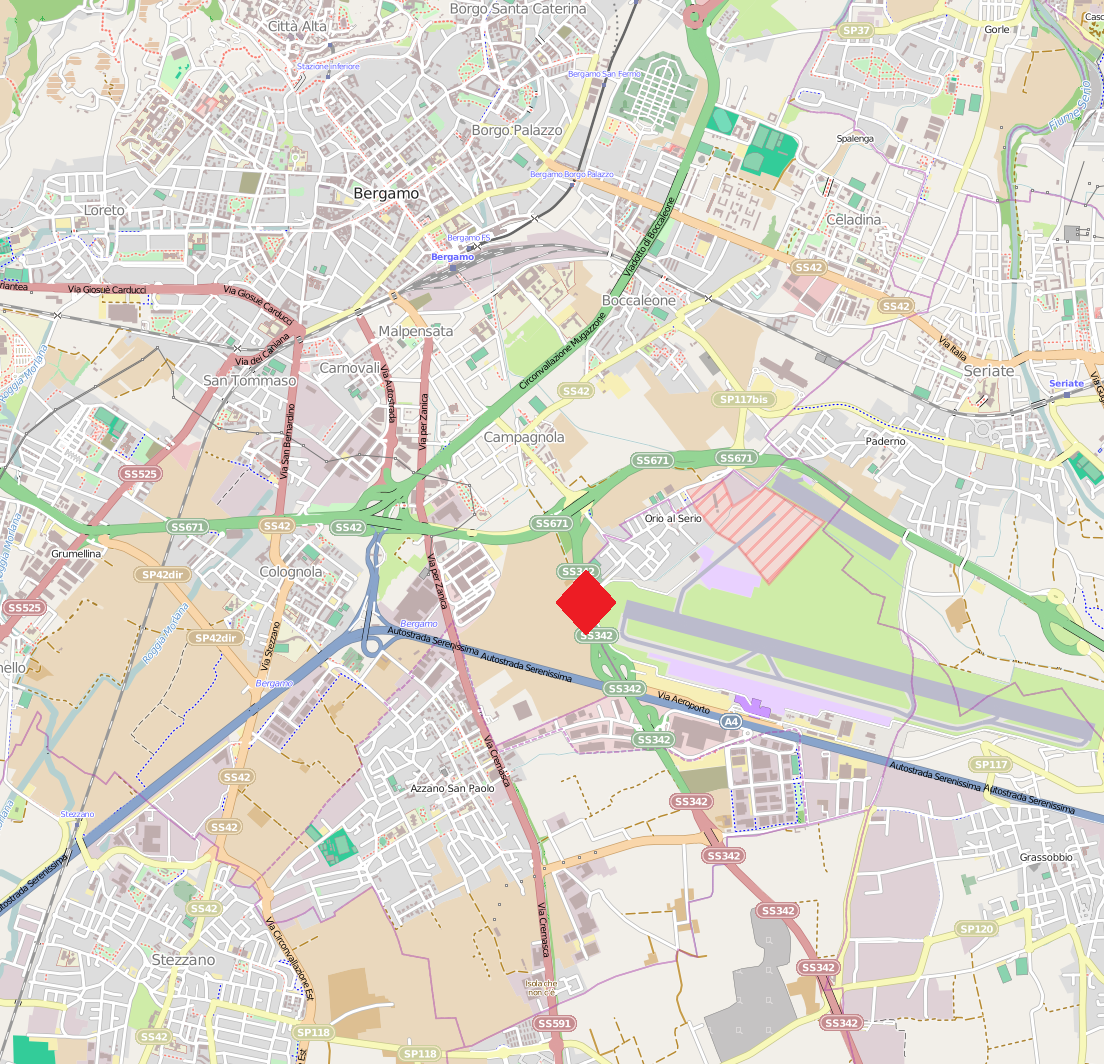
The accident location which occurred within the vicinity of Bergamo Airport

The plane landed approximately 2,000 metres (6,562 ft) into the 2,900-metre-long (9,514 ft) runway 28, and did not stop until more than 500 metres (1,640 ft) beyond the end of the runway. It broke through the airport perimeter fence, and rolled onto an active four-lane highway, with some vehicles in the adjacent parking lot being destroyed in the process. The aircraft left a long trail of destruction as it rolled off from the runway.

It sustained substantial damage, losing its CFM56 engines and main landing gear, and fracturing the horizontal stabilizer.

== Investigation ==
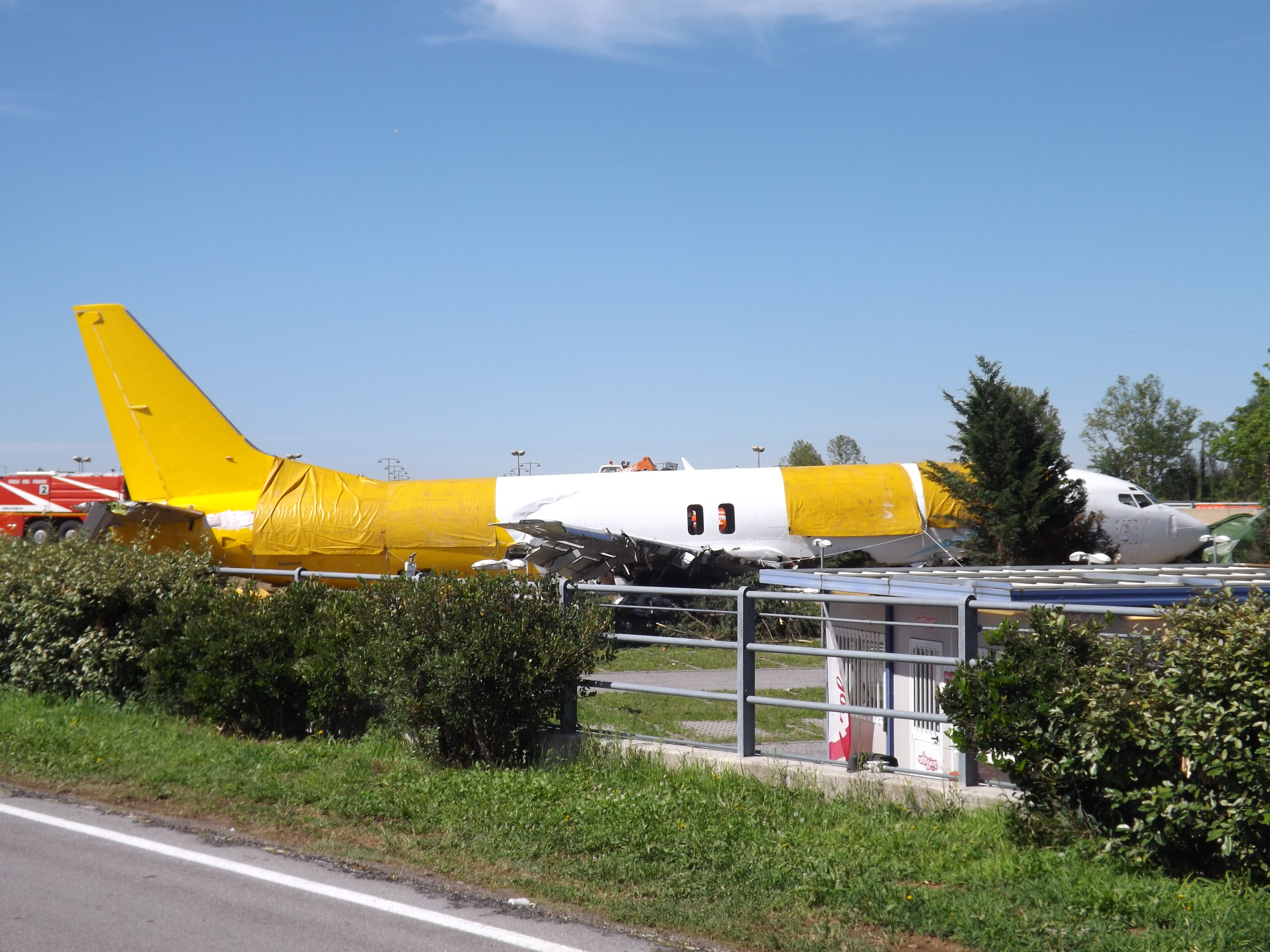
The plane resting on the road

Italian air investigation agency ANSV began an inquiry into the accident. The CVR and DFDR were retrieved on the day of the accident. A preliminary report was released on 21 September 2016.

The final report, released in August 2018, concluded that the accident was mainly caused by the loss of situational awareness of the crew.
