= ASL Airlines France =

Airline in France

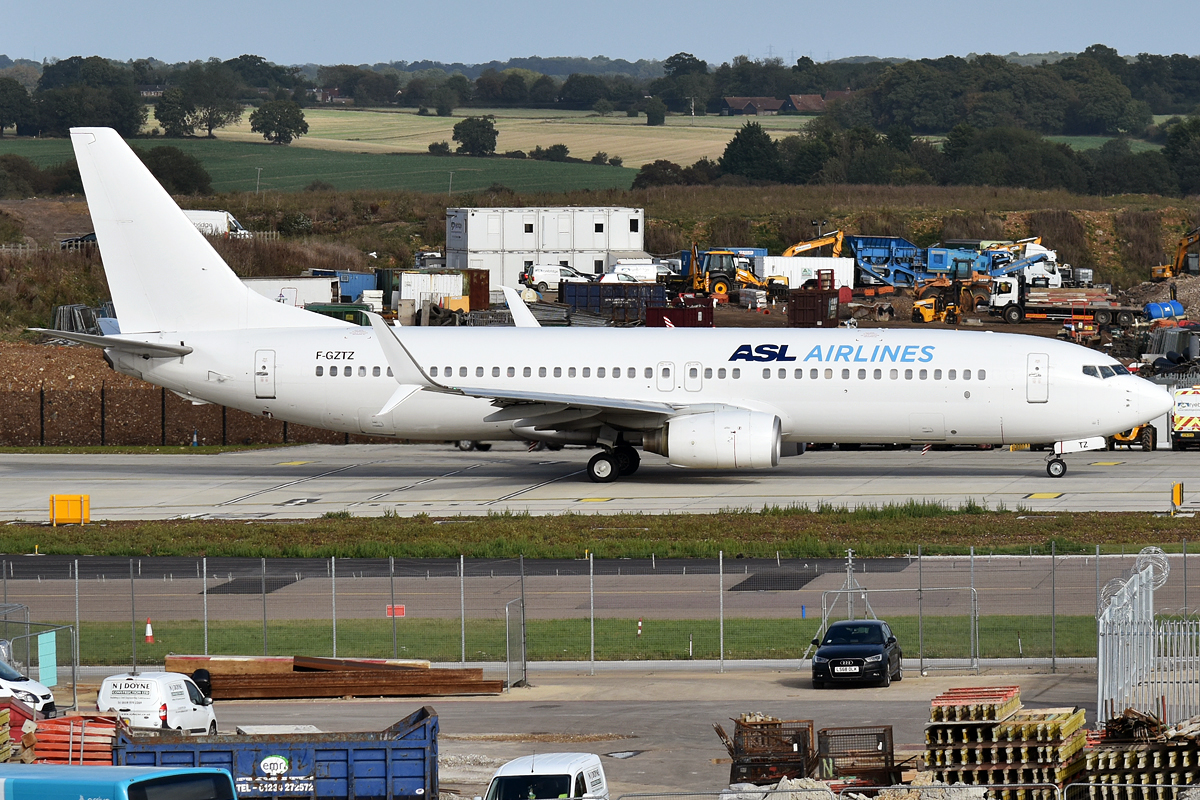
- Boeing 737-800
IATA	ICAO	Call sign
5O	FPO	FRENCH POST
- Founded: 1991
- Hubs: Charles de Gaulle Airport
- Fleet size: 18
- Parent company: ASL Aviation Holdings
- Headquarters: Tremblay-en-France, France
- Website: aslairlines.fr/

ASL Airlines France, formerly Europe Airpost, is an airline based at Paris-Charles de Gaulle and also operating from major French airports. The airline operates both cargo and passenger flights with a fleet of Boeing 737 aircraft, including the 737-700 and 737-800 passenger versions, and all-cargo the 737-300F, 737-400F and 737-800BCF. ASLF operates freighter services on behalf of express freight integrators, including FedEx Express, and has been an operator of night postal flights for La Poste. The airline also operates charter cargo flights.

The airline provides scheduled passenger services from domestic French airports to points in North Africa including Algeria. The airline also operates transatlantic passenger services, on behalf of Air Saint-Pierre to the French overseas territory of Saint Pierre and Miquelon, off the coast of Newfoundland, Canada. Additionally, ASL Airlines France operates charter passenger flights throughout Europe for leading European tour operators and brokers.

ASL Aviation Holdings DAC, the parent company of ASL Airlines Ireland, is headquartered in Swords, County Dublin, Ireland.

== History ==
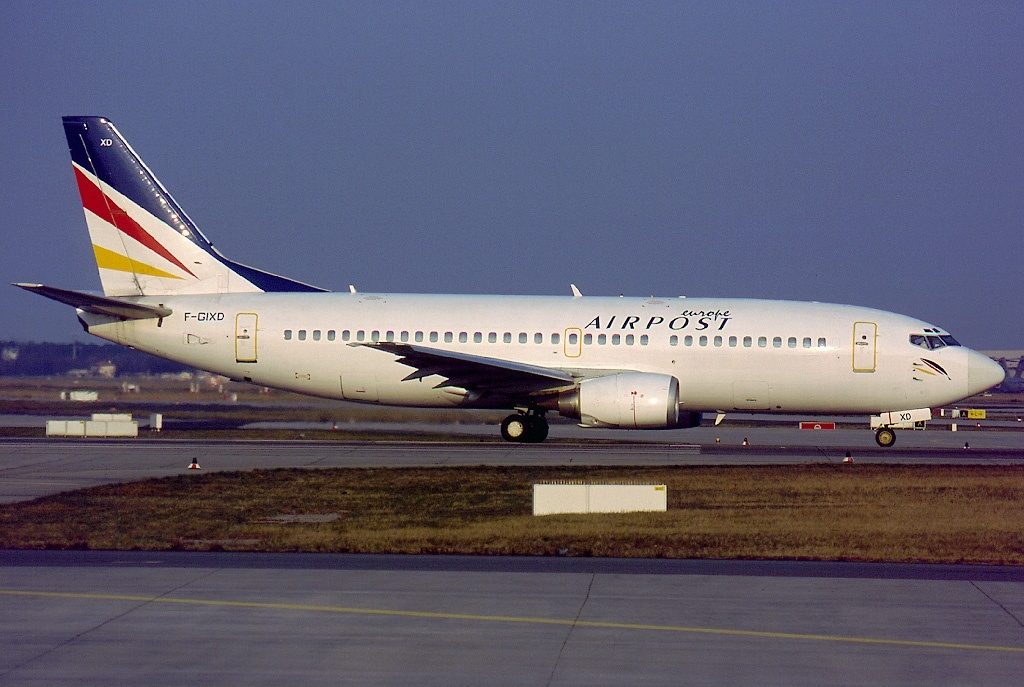
Boeing 737-300QC in Europe Airpost colours

The airline's roots go back to "Companie Générale Aéropostale" which in 1927 pioneered mail transport between Europe, Africa and South America employing famous pilots like Jean Mermoz and Antoine de Saint-Exupéry. The company was dissolved in 1932 and was then merged with other airlines to form Air France.

After WWII the company was re-established as an Air France subsidiary of from 1947 to 1991, operating as Société d'Exploitation Aéropostale but with no aircraft of its own. A similar activity was set up in 1987 when Air Inter and EAS Europe Airlines jointly founded Intercargo Service to fly cargo runs with all-cargo Vickers Vanguard made available by the latter parent. The air carrier was reformed in April 1990 with ICS-Inter Ciel Service brand and over the following year Aéropostale (or L'Aéropostale) corporate name was adopted. As an Air France Group 50%-owned subsidiary the company grew rapidly and new aircraft gradually entered the fleet: Airbus A300, Boeing 727, Boeing 737, most of them in all-cargo internal configuration. Night operations were exclusively on La Poste behalf while during the day the airline flew scheduled and charter flights on Air France behalf. Regional flights were added thanks to the use of ATR 72 tuboprops. When La Poste took over full ownership the airline corporate name was changed to Europe Airpost on 1 December 2000. Consequently, all flight activities were exclusively operated for the French national postal service. As of March 2007 The company had 400 employees.

A proposed sale to Imperial Holdings of South Africa in February 2007 was cancelled but the sale to Air Contractors of Dublin Ireland (parially owned by Imperial Holdings) was agreed in February 2008. On March 14, 2008, ASL Aviation Holdings DAC officially acquired the airline. The aircraft kept the former livery and call sign.

On June 4, 2015, the parent company ASL Aviation Holdings DAC announced that the airline would be renamed ASL Airlines France.

In June 2021, at the Paris Air Show, ASL Aviation Holdings DAC announced an order with Boeing for up to 20 737-800 Boeing Converted Freighter (BCF) aircraft - 10 firm orders and 10 options. This was extended to an additional 20 737-800(BCF) in March 2022 for a total of 40 orders including options. Eleven aircraft to operate for ASL Airlines Belgium, ASL Airlines France, ASL Airlines Ireland and ASL joint venture, K-Mile Asia.

== Fleet ==
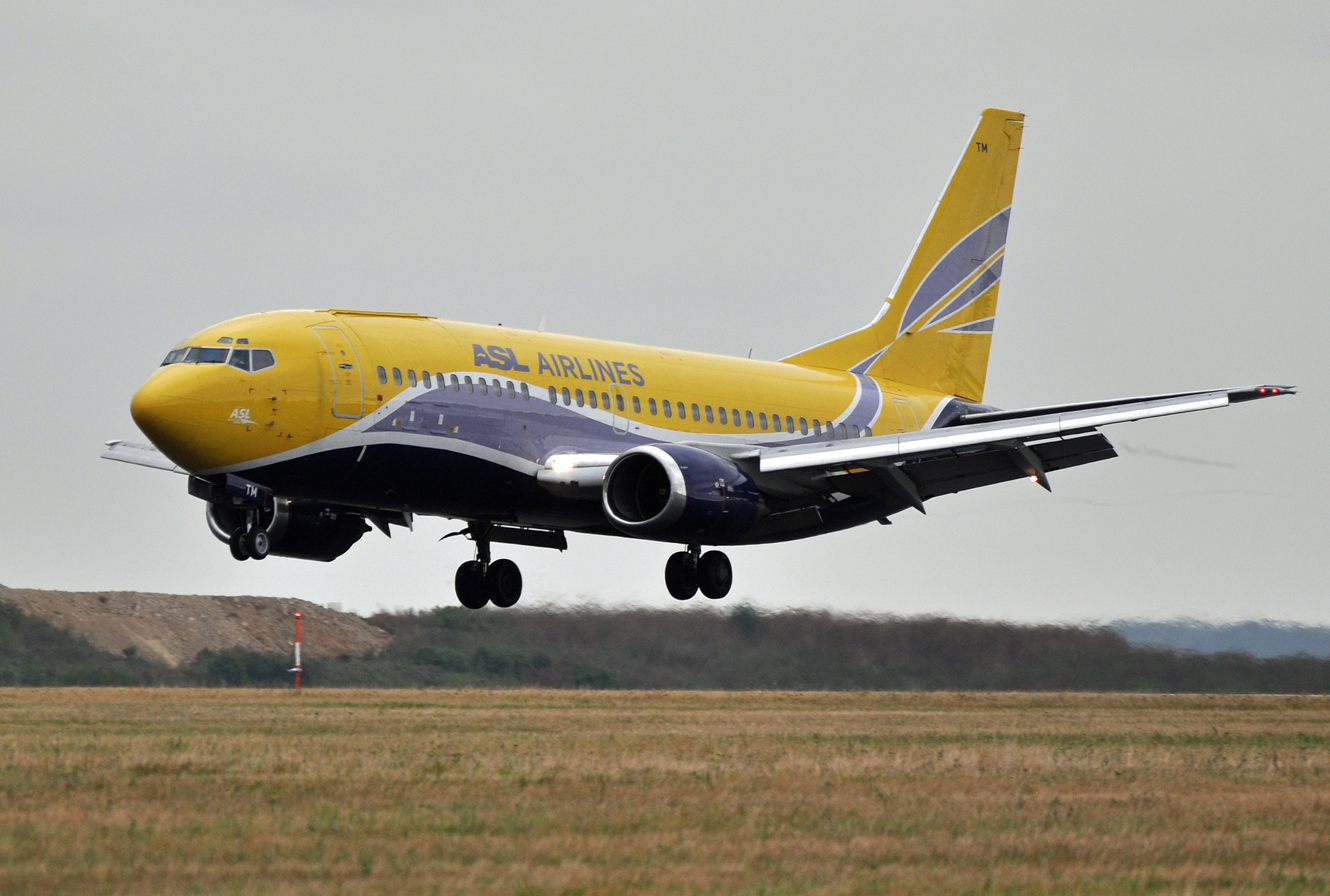
Boeing 737-300QC in basic Europe Airpost colors

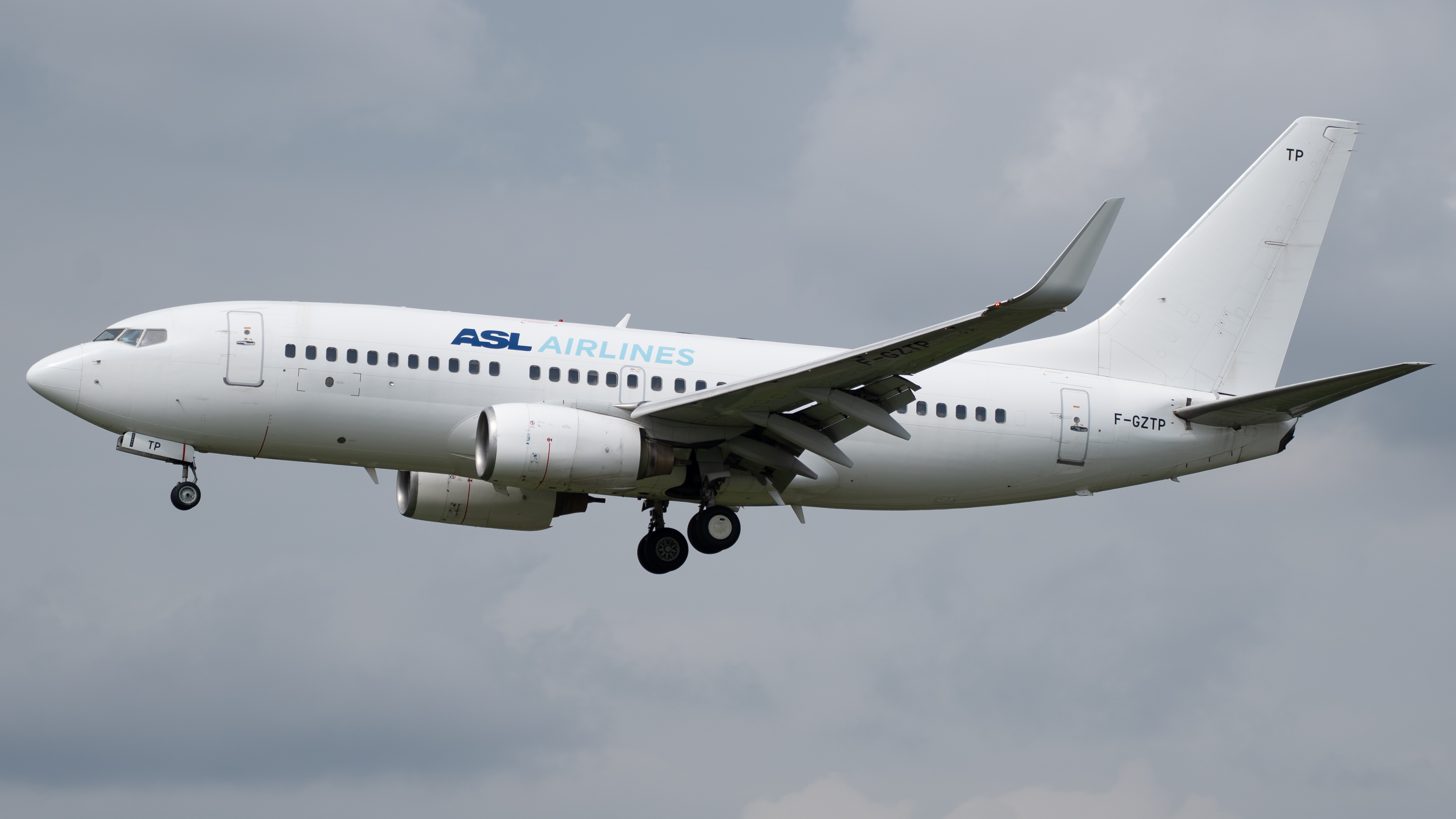
Boeing 737-700

As of July 2026, ASL Airlines France operates the following aircraft:

ASL Airlines France fleet
Aircraft	In fleet	Orders	Passengers	Notes
Boeing 737-700	1	—	149	
Boeing 737-800	5	—	189	
cargo fleet
Boeing 737-300QC	1	—	Cargo	
Boeing 737-400SF	3	—	Cargo	
Boeing 737-800BCF	8	—	Cargo	
Boeing 737-800BCF	2	—	Cargo	Operated for Fedex Express
Total	18	—		

=== Former fleet ===
As of August 2025, ASL Airlines France operated 1 Boeing 737-700, 5 Boeing 737-800, 2 Boeing 737-300QC, 3 Boeing 737-400SF and 6 Boeing 737-800BCF
