= Quikjet Airlines =

Indian cargo airline

Quikjet Cargo
IATA	ICAO	Call sign
QO	FQA	QUIK LIFT
- Commenced operations: 17 February 2016; 10 years ago
- Hubs: Indira Gandhi International Airport (Delhi)
- Fleet size: 2
- Destinations: N/A
- Headquarters: Bangalore, Karnataka, India
- Key people: Captain Preetham Philip (CEO)
- Website: www.quikjet.co.in

Quikjet Cargo Airlines Pvt. Ltd., branded as Quikjet Airlines, is an all-cargo airline based in Bangalore, India. In December 2022, Quikjet resumed operations with a new AOC.

== History ==
The airline was formed in 2007, promoted by AFL Pvt Ltd. Switzerland-based Farnair picked up a 36.2% stake in the airline in February 2012, making AFL the second-largest shareholder with 20.8% stake in the carrier. QuikJet had operated one of Farnair's twelve ATR 72-200Fs until March 2013 before temporarily closing shop in anticipation of a B737-400F. In May 2015, India's Foreign Investment Promotion Board (FIPB) approved Farnair's plan to incrementally increase its stake in Quikjet Cargo Airlines from 50.93% to 72.59% involving a minimum total foreign direct investment of Rs. 14.4 crores. Quickjet launched scheduled domestic cargo services using 737-400F aircraft. The airline started scheduled cargo flights on 16 February 2016 using a Boeing 737.

In late 2014, after its acquisition of Farnair, ASL Aviation Holdings became the majority shareholder of Quikjet Airlines.

In August 2022, Quickjet Cargo took delivery of its first Boeing 737-800F with another one on order. Quickjet Cargo will be operating for Amazon Air in India.

== Destinations ==
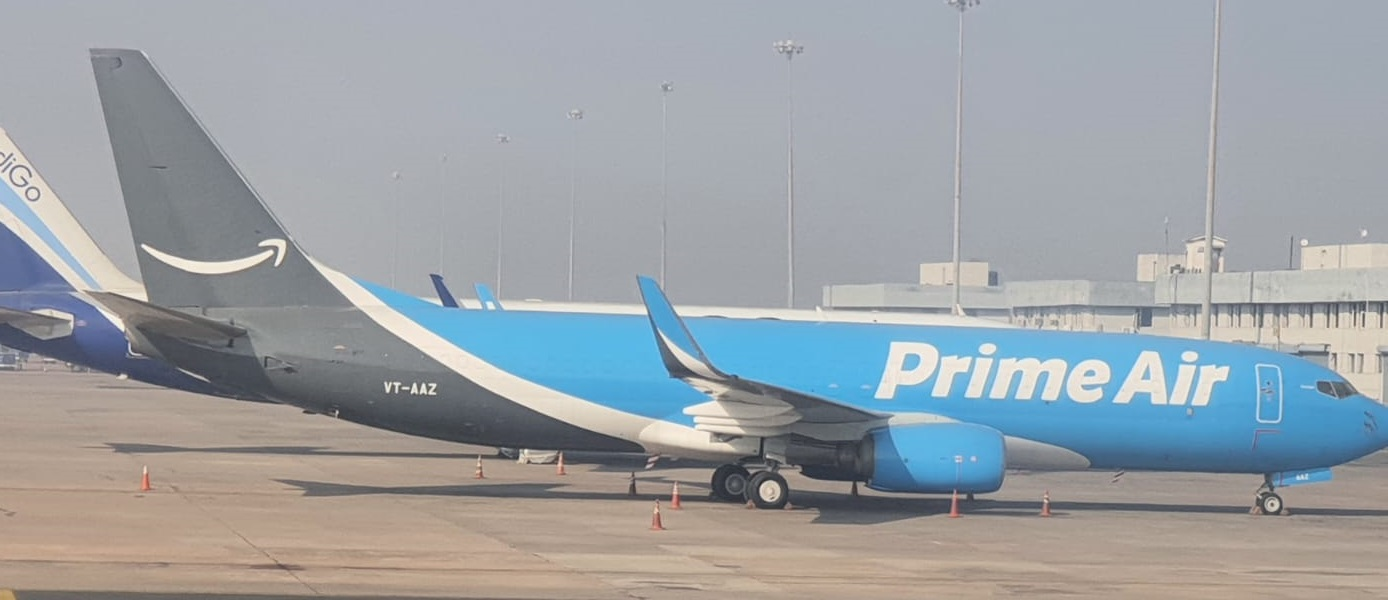
737-83N(BCF) of Quikjet Airlines at Delhi Airport. Aircraft painted as Prime Air and bears Indian registration mark VT-AAZ

As of March 2024, Quikjet Cargo operates to the following destinations.

Country (state)	City	Airport	Notes	Ref
India (Delhi)	Delhi	Indira Gandhi International Airport	Hub	
India (Karnataka)	Bangalore	Kempegowda International Airport		
India (Maharashtra)	Mumbai	Chhatrapati Shivaji Maharaj International Airport		
India (Tamil Nadu)	Chennai	Chennai International Airport	Terminated	
India (Telangana)	Hyderabad	Rajiv Gandhi International Airport	Hub	
India (West Bengal	Kolkata	Netaji Subhash Chandra Bose International Airport	Terminated	

== Fleet ==
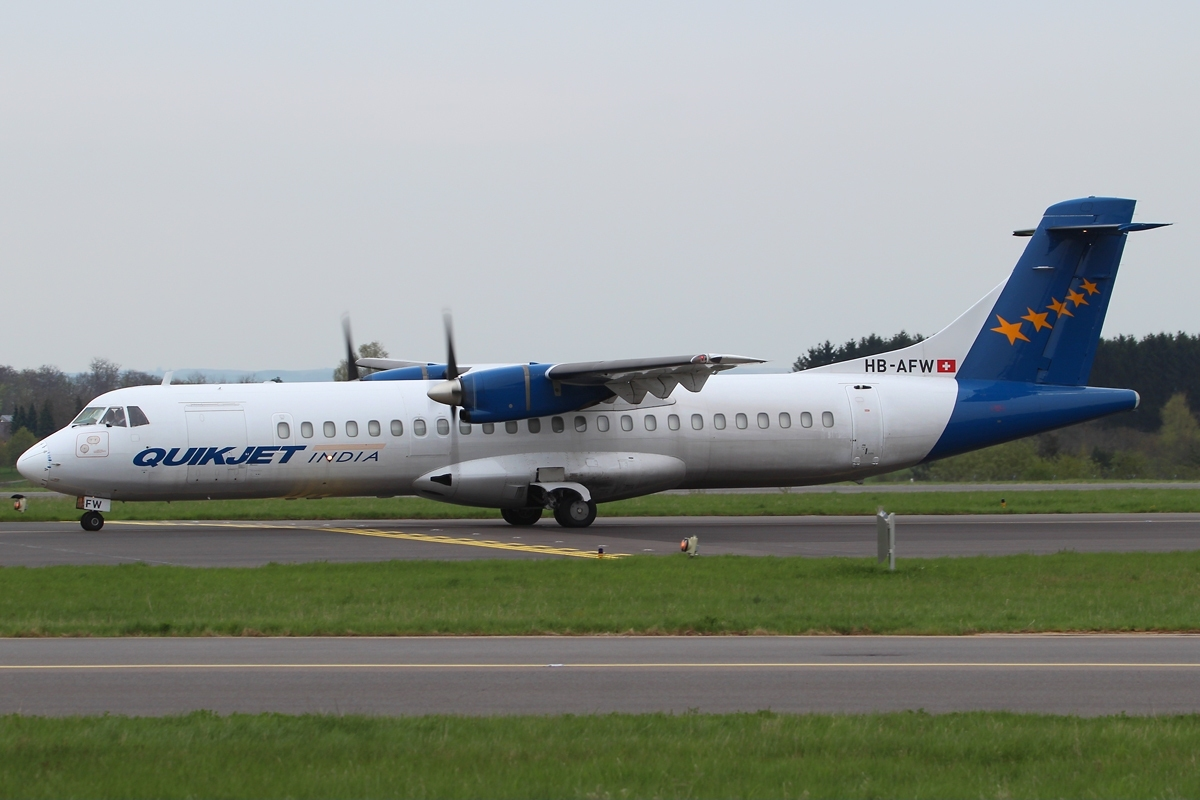
Quikjet ATR 72-200F

As of July 2026, Quikjet Airlines operates the following aircraft:

Quikjet Cargo fleet
Aircraft	In service	Orders	Notes
Boeing 737-800BCF	2	—	VT-AAZ Operated for Amazon Air
Total	2	—	

=== Former fleet ===
As of August 2025, Quikjet Airlines operated 2 Boeing 737-800BCF.

== See also ==
- List of airlines of India
