= Safair =

South African airline

IATA	ICAO	Call sign
FA	SFR	CARGO
- Founded: 1965; 61 years ago
- Hubs: O.R. Tambo International Airport
- Fleet size: 34
- Headquarters: Dublin, Ireland
- Key people: Elmar Conradie (CEO)
- Website: www.safairoperations.com

Safair is an airline based at the O.R. Tambo International Airport in Kempton Park, South Africa. It operates one of the world's largest fleets of civil Lockheed L-100 Hercules cargo aircraft.

Safair is a Level 4 BBBEE contributor. Safair Operations (PTY) LTD has been independently verified in accordance with the Codes of Good Practice, issued in terms of section 9(1) of the Broad Black Based Economic Empowerment Act 53 of 2003 as Amended per Act 46 of 2013 (Gazette 37271 of 27 January 2014).

The airline is an affiliate of ASL Aviation Holdings. Humanitarian Aid and Relief operations has always been Safair's "niche" market. Safair assists aid and relief agencies such as the United Nations, World Food Programme, and the International Committee of the Red Cross in delivering much needed humanitarian aid to stricken regions on the African continent as well as other areas in the world where such assistance is required.

== History ==
Safair Operations as it is known today was established in 1965. At the time it was known as Tropair (Pty) Ltd and was a general aviation charter company. In 1970 the company name changed to Safair Freighters (Pty) Ltd when the company was purchased by Safmarine and the new entity began operations on 18 March 1970. Its primary client in the 1980s was the South African Defence Force.

Until 2018, Safair was contracted to the Italian Antarctic Program (National Antarctic Research Program (PNRA)) to support science over the austral summer, flying Lockheed L-100-30 missions from Christchurch, New Zealand to Zucchelli Station in Terra Nova Bay, Antarctica. In 2007, Safair obtained its IATA Operational Safety Audit (IOSA) approval.

== Fleet ==
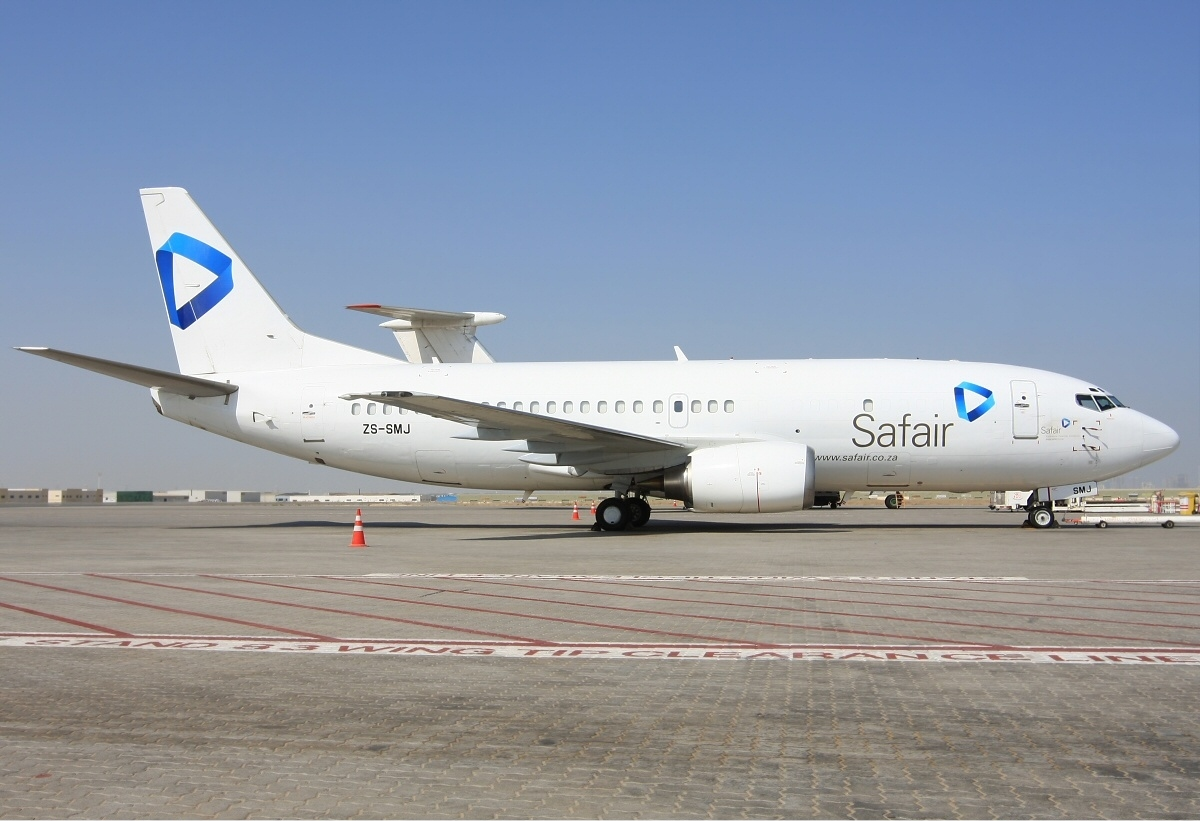
Safair Boeing 737-300 at Sharjah International Airport

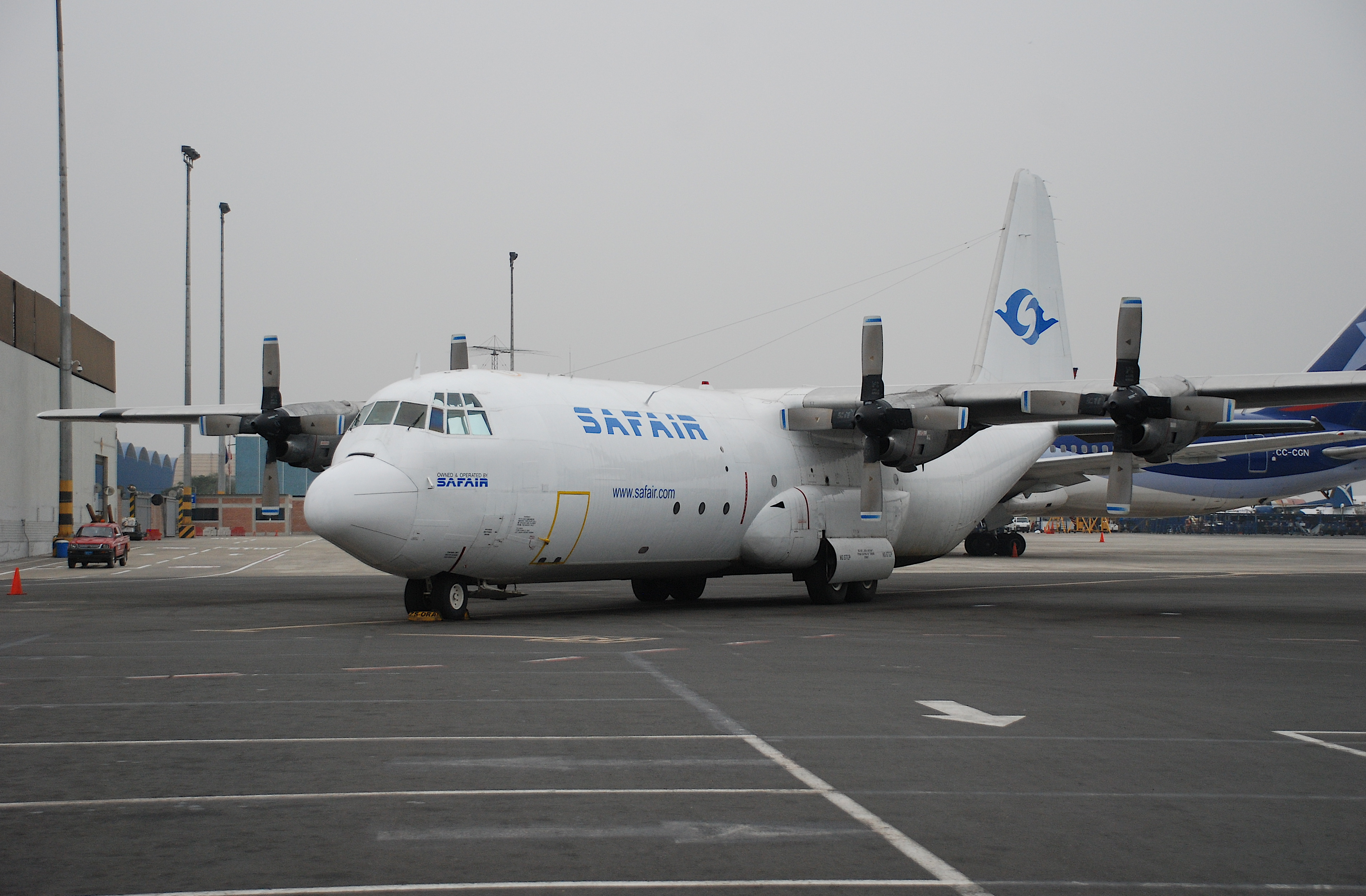
Safair Lockheed L-100-30 Hercules

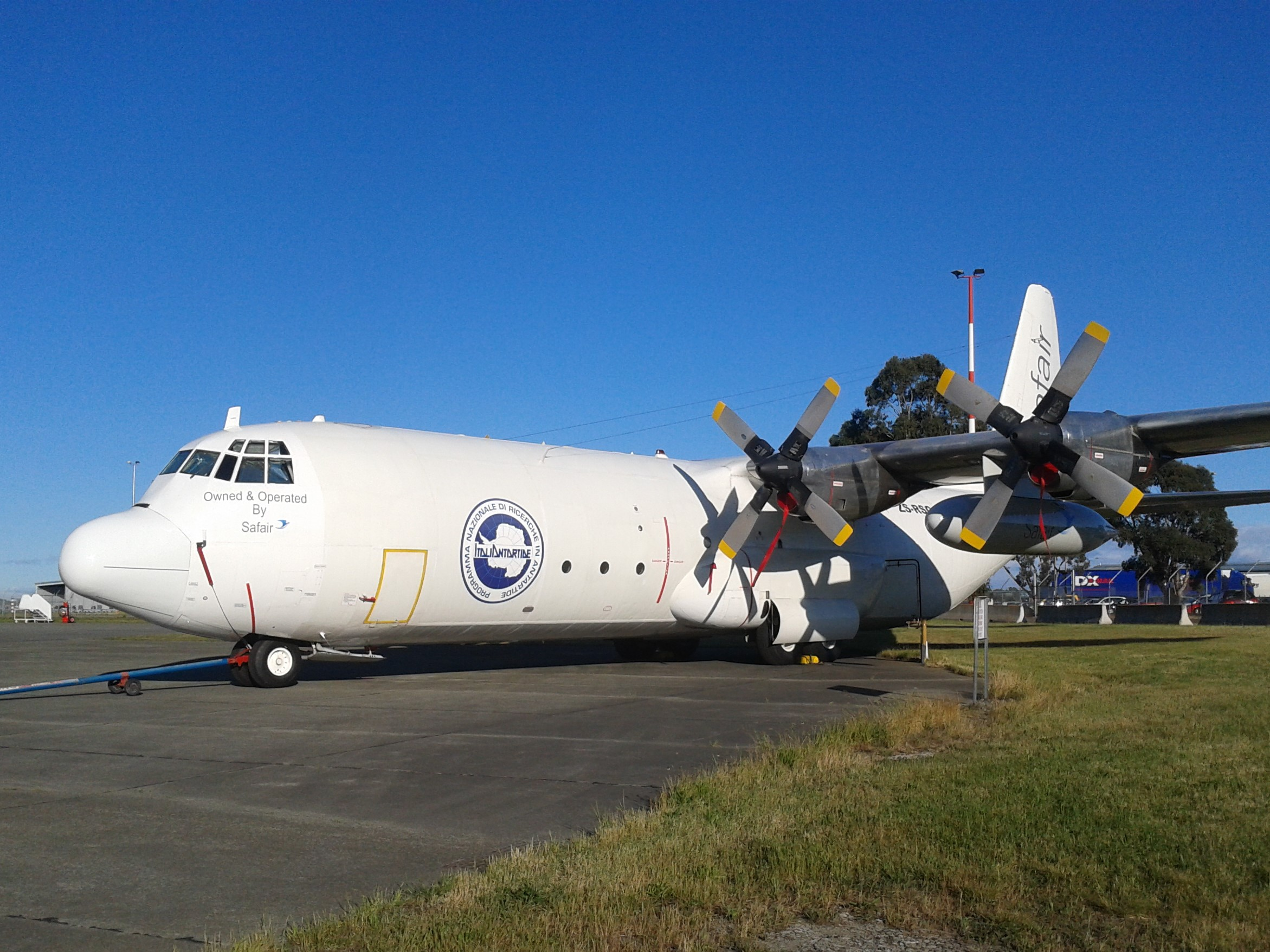
Safair L100-30 ZS-RSC sitting on the Deep Freeze ramp at Christchurch International Airport in between missions to Zucchelli Station in Terra Nova Bay, Antarctica

As of July 2019 the Safair fleet consists of the following aircraft:

Safair fleet
Aircraft	In fleet	On order	Notes
Boeing 737-800	7		Passenger
Boeing 737-400	10		Passenger
Boeing 737-400C	1		Combi aircraft
Lockheed L-100-30 Hercules	6		Freight only, passenger only, or combi
Lockheed Martin LM-100J		10	Ordered in 2014 to replace current L-100s
Total	24	10	

=== Previously operated ===
- ATR 72
- Beechcraft 1900D
- Boeing 707-320
- Boeing 727-100
- Boeing 727-200
- Boeing 737-200
- British Aerospace 146-100QT
- British Aerospace 146-200QC
- CASA CN-235
- Convair 580
- Lockheed L-100-20 Hercules
- McDonnell Douglas MD-81
- McDonnell Douglas MD-82
- Partenavia P.68B
- Partenavia AP.68TP-600 Viator

== Reliability and on-time performance ==
In October 2023, Safair was the most reliable low-cost carrier according to Cirium's On-Time Performance rankings. In October 2023, Safair flights arrived on time 90.81% of the time.

== FlySafair ==
In 2013, Safair created a low-cost carrier operating under a separate brand called FlySafair. The initial plan to operate flights in October 2013 had to be cancelled, as a result of a High Court application by Comair. FlySafair is currently operational, with the first flight having taken place on 16 October 2014. FlySafair operates passenger flights between Cape Town, George, Port Elizabeth, Johannesburg, Lanseria, Durban, Bloemfontein, Hoedspruit, Kruger Mpumalanga International Airport, East London, Zanzibar, Mauritius, Harare, Livingstone, Victoria Falls and Maputo.
