= ASL Airlines Hungary =

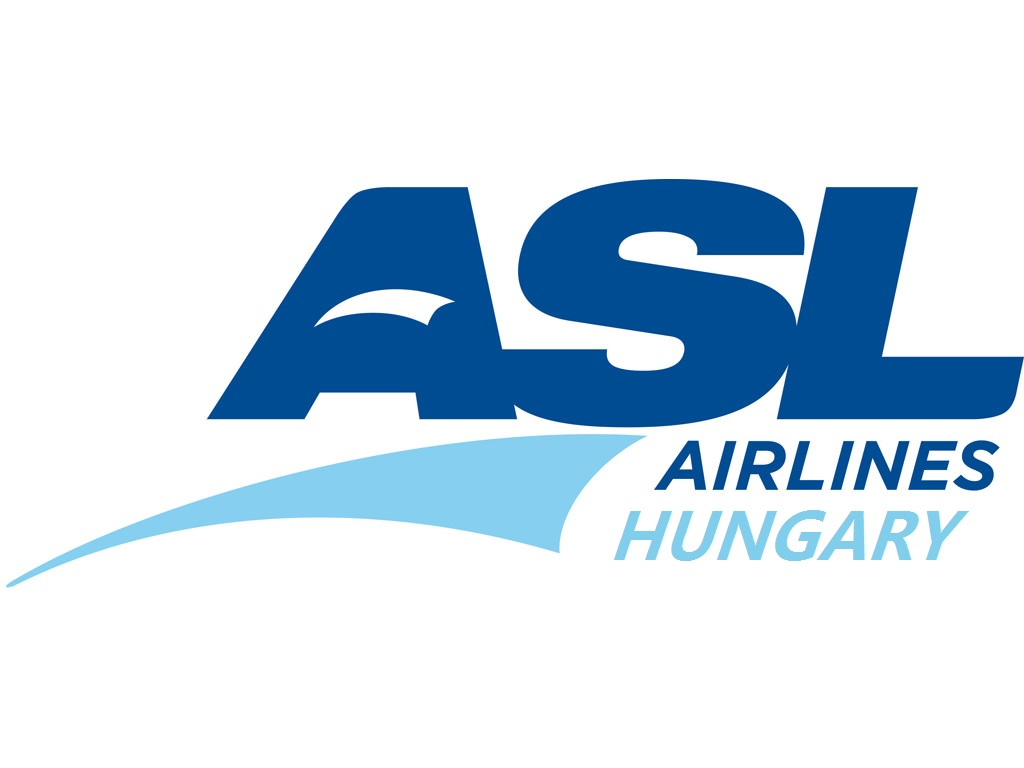
IATA	ICAO	Call sign
-	FAH	BLUE STRIP
- Founded: 1990
- Ceased operations: 2021
- Hubs: Budapest Ferihegy International Airport
- Fleet size: 8
- Parent company: ASL Aviation Holdings
- Headquarters: Budapest, Hungary
- Website: aslairlines.hu

ASL Airlines Hungary Kft, formerly Farnair Hungary, was an airline based on the property of Budapest Ferenc Liszt International Airport in Budapest, Hungary. It operated scheduled express cargo services, ad hoc charter services and relief missions. The airline ran a fleet of Boeing B737-400SF midrange freighter aircraft serving customers in the express parcel, mail and online trading sectors. Its main base was Budapest Ferihegy International Airport.

== History ==
The airline was established and started operations in 1990. It was founded as NAWA Air Transport, the first privately owned airline in Hungary after World War II. In 1993 it was acquired by Farner Air Transport and was renamed Farner Air Transport Hungary. It became Farnair Hungary in 1997. It was wholly owned by Farnair Switzerland.

ASL Airlines Hungary was part of the global Aviation Services Group ASL Aviation Holdings, based in Dublin, Ireland. The group consists of several companies, amongst them eight airlines, maintenance facilities and several leasing companies. The airline offered more than 120 flights per week on its European network, that spreads from Scandinavia to Romania, Italy, Greece, the United Kingdom and Ireland.

On 4 June 2015, ASL Aviation Group, the parent company of Farnair Hungary, announced that Farnair Hungary will be rebranded as ASL Airlines Hungary.

In 2021, without any further notice, the Hungarian brand of the airline was abolished, and its fleet was integrated into ASL Airlines Ireland.

== Fleet ==
The ASL Airlines Hungary fleet included the following aircraft as of April 2022, prior to its demise:

ASL Airlines Hungary Fleet
Aircraft	In service	Orders	Notes
Boeing 737-400F	8	—	
Total	8	—	

== Accidents and incidents ==
- On 27 January 2005, a Farnair Hungary Let L-410 aircraft was carrying out a non-directional beacon let-down with radar assistance at Iași Airport, Romania, but when the crew notified air traffic control of their position over the airport beacon and their intention to turn right outbound, they were seen to turn left. Then the aircraft spiralled down to crash on the airfield. The two crew members on board were killed. There was light snow at the time.
- On 5 August 2016, ASL Airlines Hungary Flight 7332, a Boeing 737-476(SF) (registered as HA-FAX), overshot runway 28 when landing at Il Caravaggio International Airport in Bergamo and came to a stop on the highway, 300 metres from the runway end. There were no injuries, but some cars were destroyed and the plane sustained substantial damage as a result of the incident.
