= K-Mile Air =

Thai cargo airline

K-Mile Asia
IATA	ICAO	Call sign
8K	KMI	KAY-MILE AIR
- Founded: 2004; 22 years ago
- Hubs: Suvarnabhumi Airport
- Fleet size: 6
- Destinations: 10
- Headquarters: Bangkok, Thailand
- Key people: Thikarn Supawirachbuncha (CEO), Pansith Sasunee (MD)
- Website: k-mile.co.th

K-Mile Asia is a Thai-registered express cargo and passenger airline based at Suvarnabhumi Airport. It was established in 2004 and began operations in 2006.

K-Mile Asia's business model focuses on the needs of air express, courier and postal companies who require customized charter cargo transportation. It provides both scheduled and charter cargo flights to South East Asia and other routes within the region. In addition to its scheduled operation, the airline offers charter flights across its network serving Thailand, Vietnam, Cambodia, Hong Kong, Indonesia, Singapore, and Bangladesh.

K-Mile Asia's current fleet comprises two Boeing 737-400F, two Boeing 737-800F and two Boeing 767-300F to cater to the growing intra-Asia airfreight.

Farnair Switzerland acquired a 45% share in K-Mile on 12 March 2014. After ASL Aviation Holdings acquired Farnair and K-Mile in December 2014, K-Mile became a joint venture airline with a 45% stake.

== Destinations ==
K-Mile Air operates to the following destinations:

Country	City	Airport name	Notes	Refs
Cambodia	Phnom Penh	Techo International Airport		
Hong Kong	Hong Kong	Hong Kong International Airport		
India	Chennai	Chennai International Airport		
Indonesia	Jakarta	Soekarno–Hatta International Airport		
Malaysia	Penang	Penang International Airport		
Malaysia	Kuala Lumpur	Kuala Lumpur International Airport		
Singapore	Singapore	Changi Airport		
Thailand	Bangkok	Suvarnabhumi Airport	Hub	
Thailand	Phuket	Phuket International Airport	Terminated	
Thailand	Udon Thani	Udon Thani International Airport	Terminated	
Vietnam	Hanoi	Noi Bai International Airport		
Bangladesh	Dhaka	Hazrat Shahjalal International Airport		

== Fleet ==
As of August 2025, K-Mile Air operates the following aircraft:

K-Mile Air fleet
Aircraft	In fleet	Orders	Notes
Boeing 737-400SF	2	—	
Boeing 737-800BCF	2	—	
Boeing 767-300ER(BCF)	2	-	
Total	6	-	
