= TNT Express =

International package delivery company owned by FedEx

TNT Express Worldwide NV

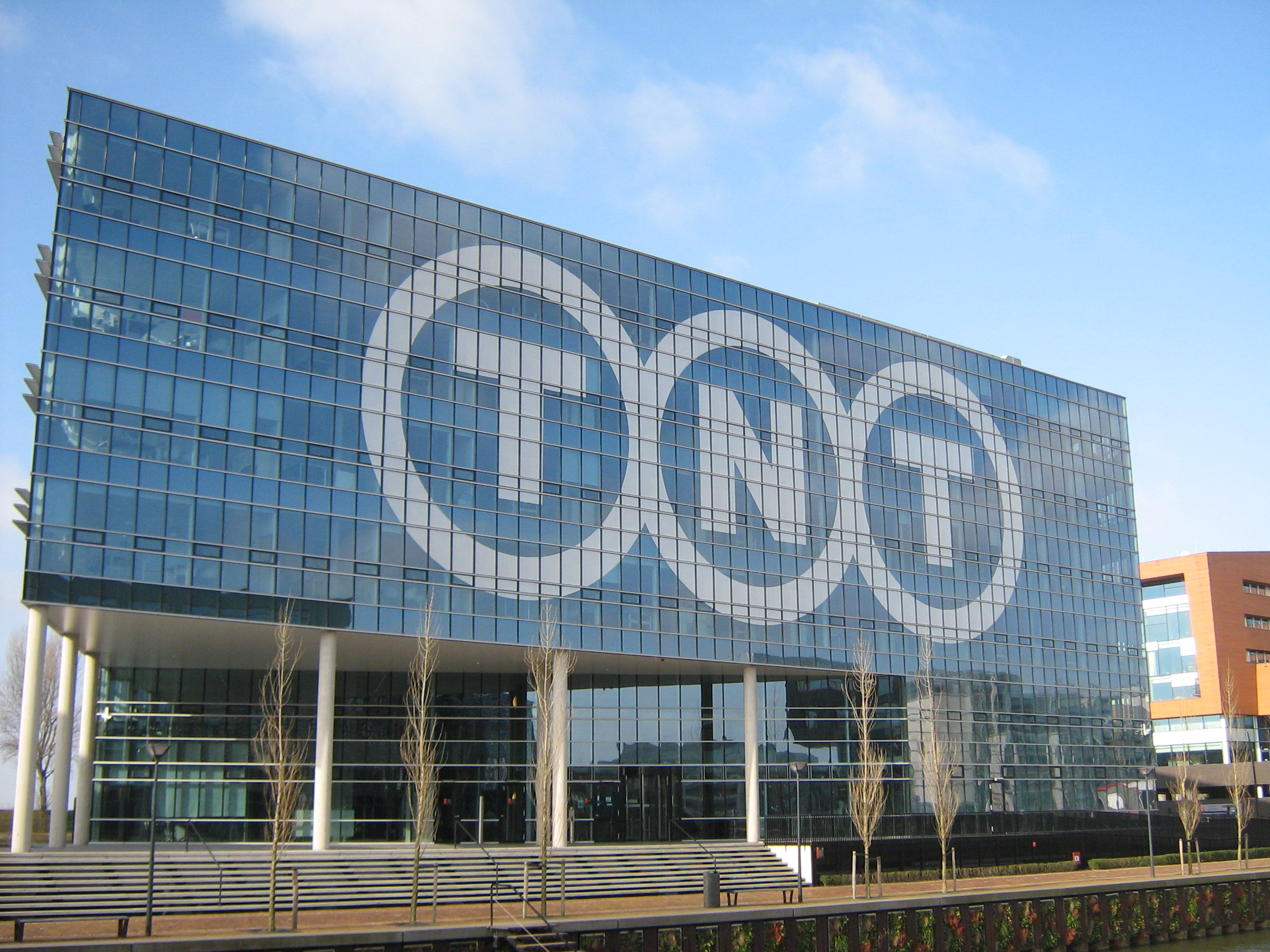
- TNT Express headquarters
- Industry: Transportation
- Predecessor: TNT NV
- Founded: 26 May 2011; 15 years ago
- Headquarters: Hoofddorp, Netherlands
- Area served: Worldwide
- Key people: Karen Reddington (CEO)
- Services: Express Delivery Logistics Services
- Revenue: €15.6 billion (2020)
- Owner: FedEx
- Parent: FedEx (since 2016)
- Website: tnt.com

TNT Express is an international courier delivery services company with its headquarters in Hoofddorp, Netherlands. It was acquired by FedEx.

== History ==
The namesake Thomas Nationwide Transport company was originally established in 1946 with a single truck in Adelaide, South Australia.

On 26 May 2011, TNT Express was spun off from its parent company, TNT NV, being listed on the Euronext Amsterdam. TNT NV subsequently renamed itself PostNL.

In March 2012, UPS announced its intention to acquire TNT Express for US$6.7 billion. However, the deal fell through in January 2013, after it was announced that UPS had failed to obtain permission from the European Commission, and as such, had been blocked on competition grounds.

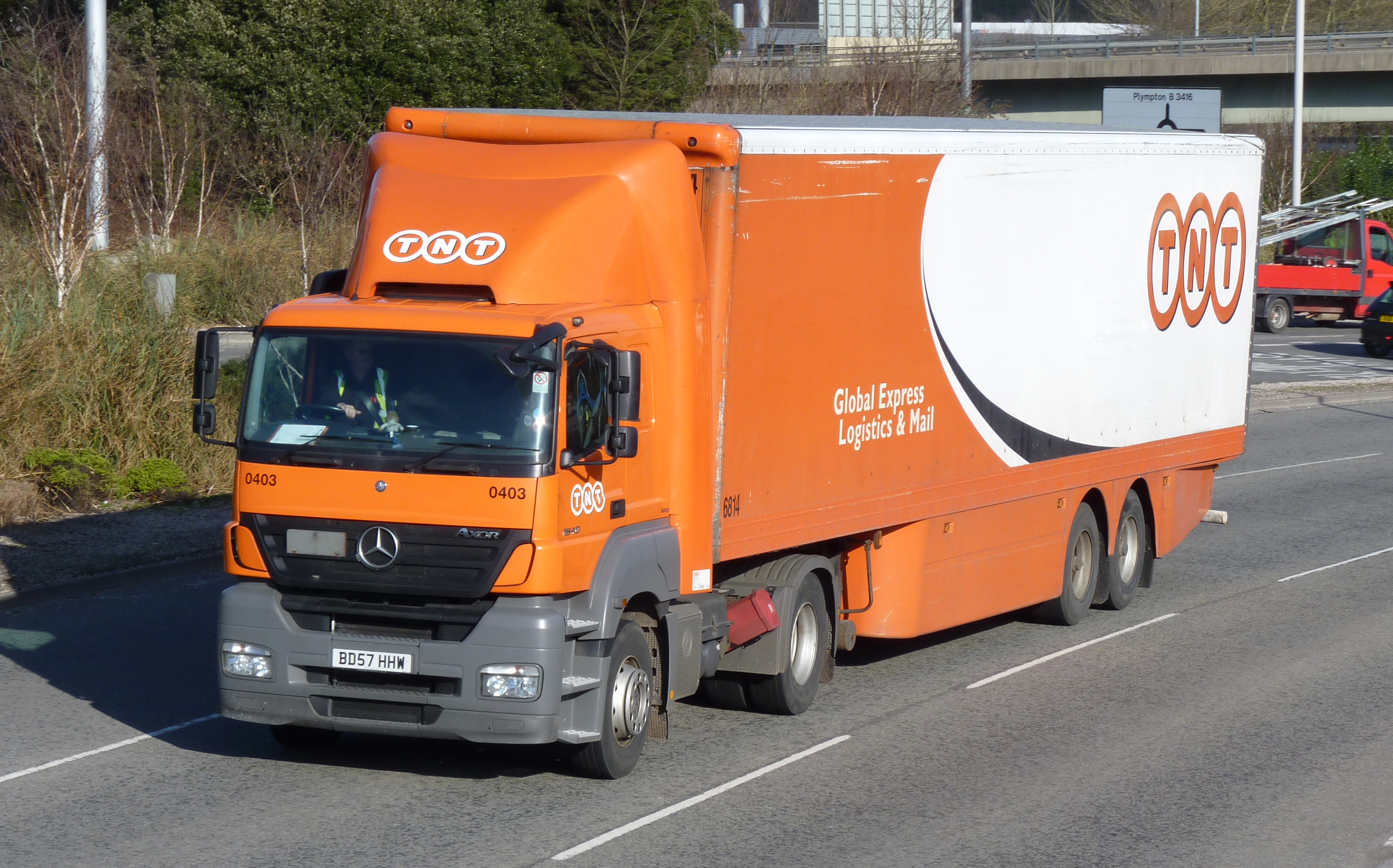
TNT Express truck in Plymouth, England in February 2010

In April 2015, FedEx announced its agreed intention to buy TNT Express for €4.4 billion, as it looked to expand its operations in Europe. The European Commission launched an investigation into the planned acquisition and on 8 January 2016, approved the deal. The transaction was completed on 25 May 2016.

In June 2017, TNT Express was badly affected by the NotPetya cyber attack, partly because some operations and communication systems were based in Ukraine, where the cyber attack originated. TNT had to operate using manual processes for months creating very large backlogs. Some records were entirely lost.

== Operations ==
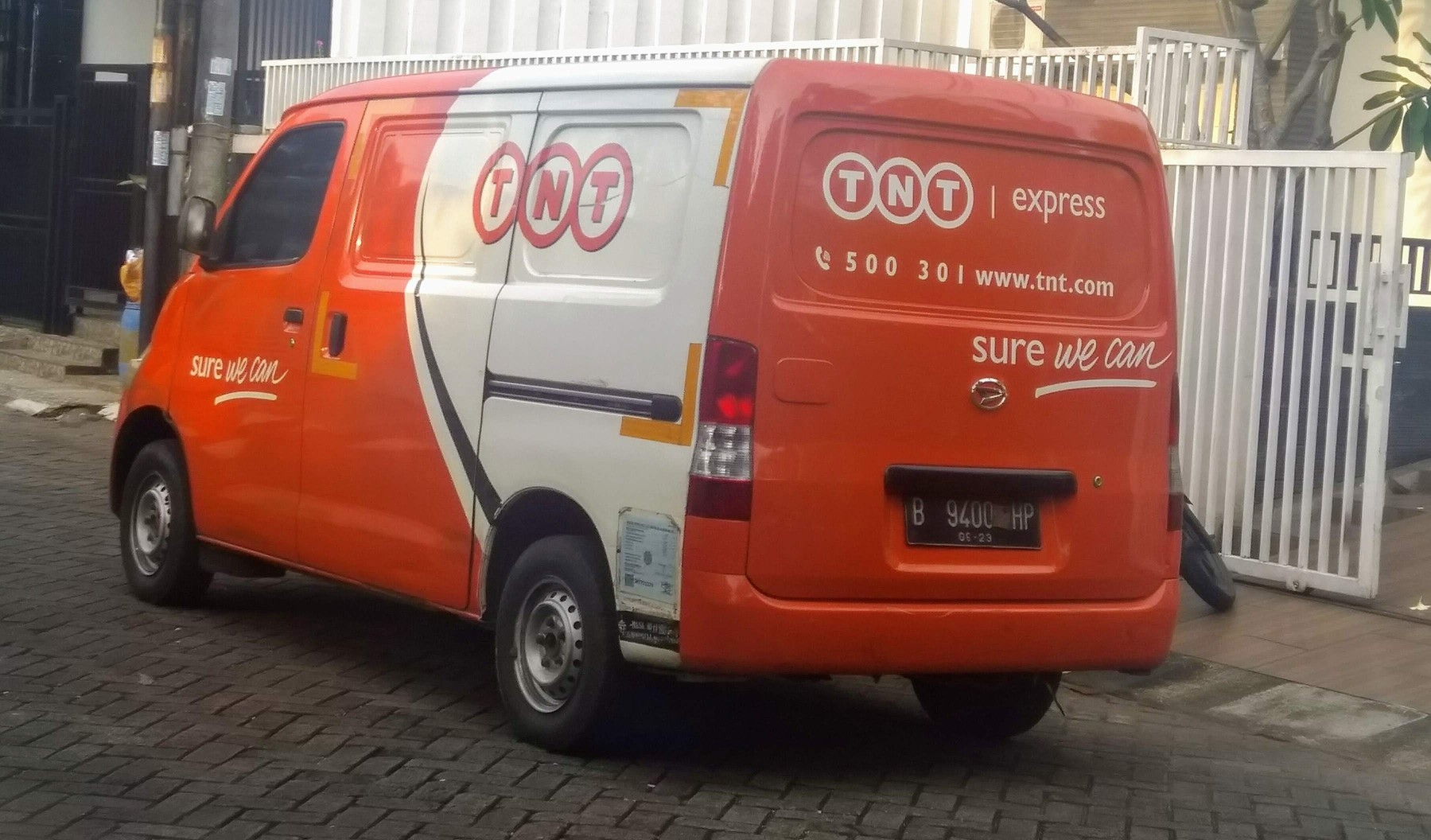
TNT Express van in South Tangerang, Indonesia in February 2021

TNT offered road and air delivery services in Europe, the Asia Pacific region, the Americas, the Middle East, and Africa. In June 2014, TNT conducted a rail freight trial assessing improving support to businesses in the United Kingdom, and cutting carbon emissions.
