= ASL Airlines Switzerland =

Swiss airline (1984–2018)

IATA	ICAO	Call sign
-	FAT	FARNER
- Founded: 1984
- Ceased operations: February 2018
- Hubs: EuroAirport Basel-Mulhouse-Freiburg
- Secondary hubs: Cologne Bonn Airport
- Fleet size: 13
- Parent company: ASL Aviation Group
- Headquarters: Bottmingen, Basel-Landschaft
- Website: www.aslairlines.ch

ASL Airlines Switzerland AG was a Swiss passenger charter and freight airline. The airline operated package delivery services from its base at EuroAirport Basel-Mulhouse-Freiburg throughout Europe, in addition to transport for the Swiss Armed Forces, humanitarian organizations, and the oil industry. Its head office was in Bottmingen, Basel-Landschaft.

== History ==
The airline was established and started operations in 1984.

In December 2014 the Farnair Group was acquired by Ireland-based ASL Aviation Group. On 4 June 2015, ASL Aviation Group announced that Farnair Switzerland will be rebranded as ASL Airlines Switzerland.

The airline's head office moved to Bottmingen, Basel-Landschaft, in proximity to EuroAirport Basel-Mulhouse-Freiburg, in August 2015. The airline's head office used to be on the Swiss side of EuroAirport Basel then in Allschwil, Basel-Landschaft.

ASL Airlines Switzerland ceased all operations on 1 February 2018.

== Fleet ==
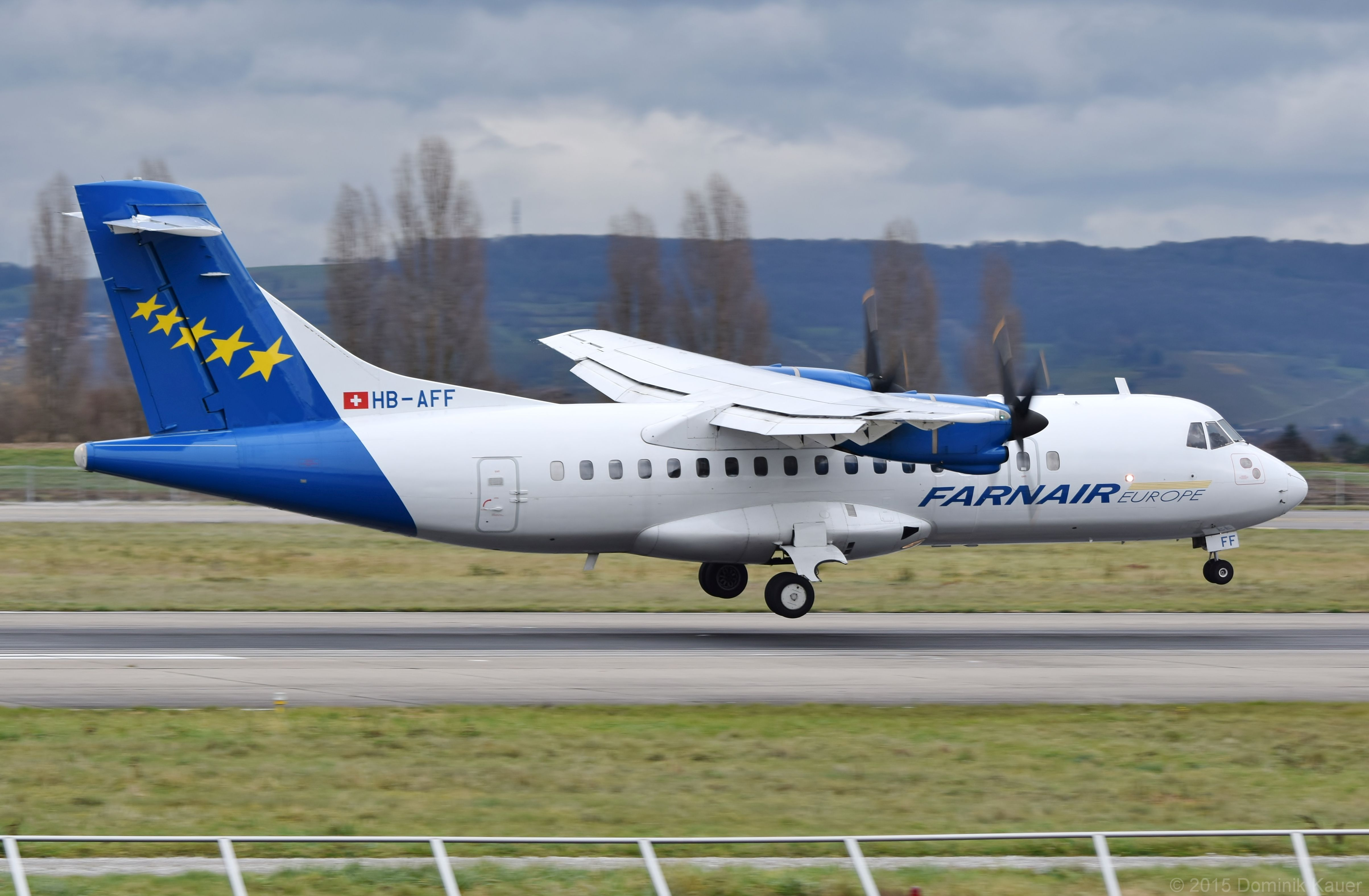
An ASL Airlines Switzerland ATR 42-300 in its former Farnair livery.

As of October 2016, the ASL Airlines Switzerland fleet comprised the following aircraft:

ASL Airlines Switzerland Fleet
Aircraft	In service	Orders	Notes
Passenger fleet
ATR 42-300	1	—	Disposed to Air North
Cargo fleet
ATR 72-200F	11	—	Disposed to ASL Airlines Ireland and DHL Aviation
ATR 72-500F	1	—	Disposed to ASL Airlines Ireland
Total	13	—	
