= Avro (disambiguation) =

Avro was a British aircraft manufacturer from 1910 to 1963.

Avro or AVRO may also refer to:

== Companies and organisations ==
- Avro Canada, a Canadian aircraft manufacturer
- Avro International Aerospace, a British aircraft manufacturer from 1993 to 1998
- Algemene Vereniging Radio Omroep, a Dutch public-service broadcasting organisation
- Avro Energy, a defunct energy supplier in the United Kingdom, absorbed by Octopus Energy Group
- Avro F.C., a non-league football club in Oldham, England

== Computing ==
- Apache Avro, a remote procedure call and data serialization framework
- Avro Keyboard, a Bengali typing software / keyboard layout changer

== Other uses ==
- AVRO 1938 chess tournament
- Avro Manhattan (1914–1990), writer critical of the Catholic Church

== See also ==
- Euro (Turkish: Avro), a currency
