= List of BAe 146 operators =

The following is a list of current and former operators of BAe 146 and Avro RJ operators.

== Current operators ==
=== Indonesia ===
- Ministry of State Secretariat - Presidential aircraft. The aircraft are owned and operated by Pelita Air

== Former operators ==
=== Austria ===
- Government of Austria - never flown

=== Australia ===
- National Jet Express, formerly Cobham Aviation Services Australia
- Pionair Australia - retired type

=== Libya ===
- Free Libyan Air Force

=== Mali ===
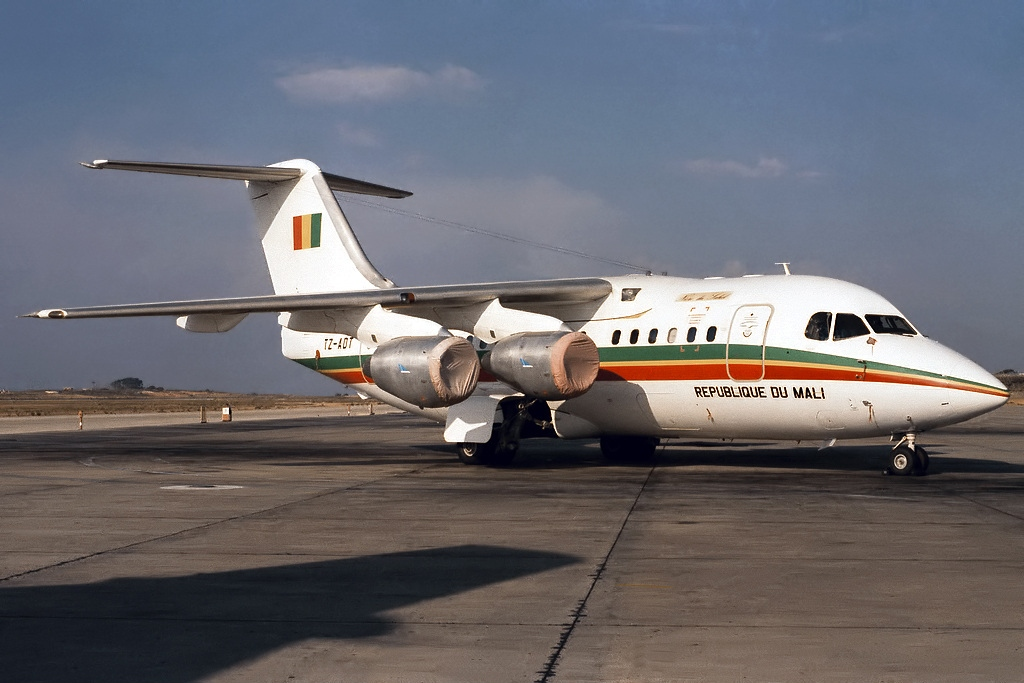
Government of Mali BAe 146-100 at Faro Airport, Portugal 1985

- Government of Mali - former operator

=== Sweden ===
- Malmö Aviation / BRA Braathens Regional Airlines

=== United Kingdom ===
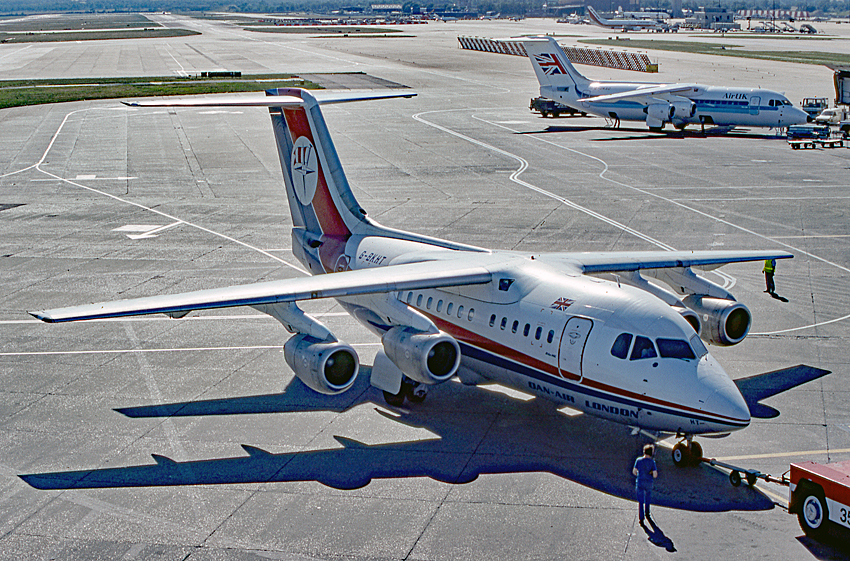
Dan Air and Air UK Bae146s at Gatwick

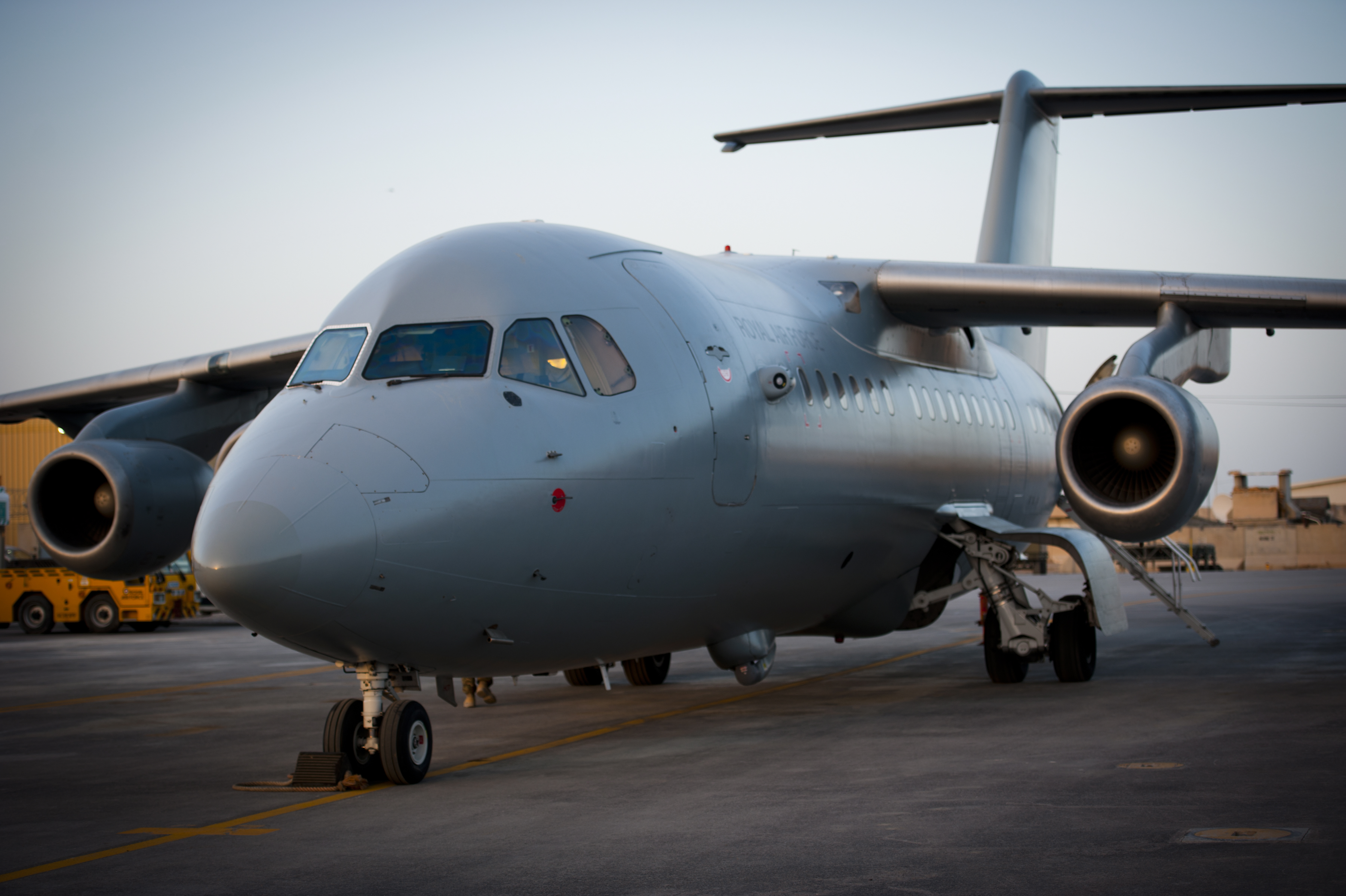
RAF BAe 146QC at Kandahar Air Base, Afghanistan 2013

- Facility for Airborne Atmospheric Measurements - ceased operations
- Royal Air Force - No. 32 (The Royal) Squadron RAF (former operator)

=== Zimbabwe ===
- Air Force of Zimbabwe - No. 3 Squadron
