= LAN Chile Flight 1069 =

1991 aviation accident

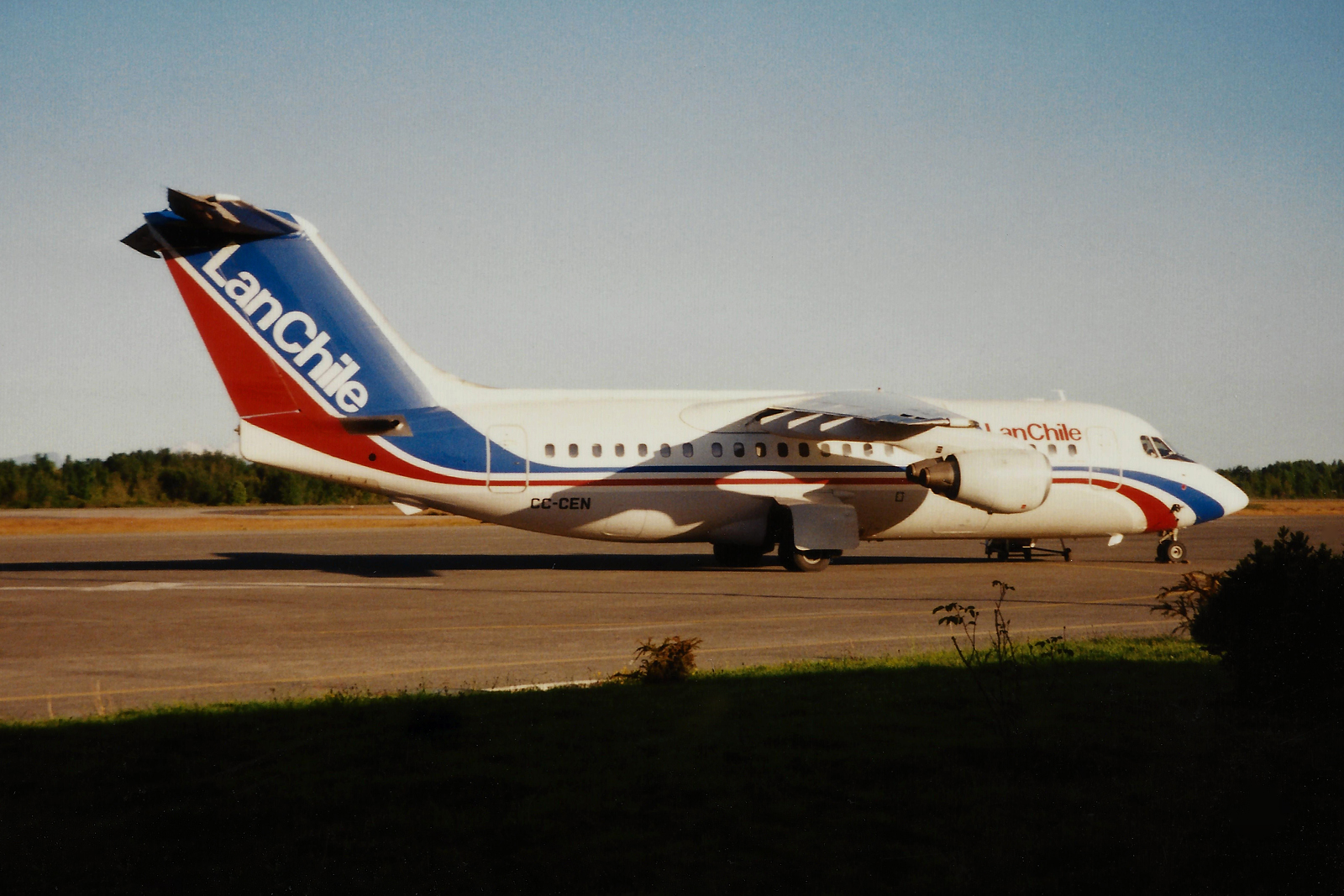
- CC-CEN, a LAN Chile BAe 146 sister ship of the accident aircraft.

Accident
- Date: 20 February 1991
- Summary: Runway excursion due to pilot error
- Site: Puerto Williams Airport, Chile

Aircraft
- Aircraft type: British Aerospace BAe 146-200
- Operator: LAN Chile
- Registration: CC-CET
- Flight origin: Punta Arenas Airport, Chile
- Destination: Puerto Williams Airport, Chile
- Occupants: 72
- Passengers: 66
- Crew: 6
- Fatalities: 20
- Injuries: 47
- Survivors: 52

LAN Chile Flight 1069 was a passenger flight which suffered an accident at Puerto Williams Airport in Chile on February 20, 1991. The regional flight from Punta Arenas Airport, approximately 300 kilometres (190 mi) distant, overran the runway on arrival at Puerto Williams, killing 20 of the 66 passengers. All 6 crew members survived.

== Aircraft and crew ==
The aircraft was a British Aerospace BAe 146-200, registered as CC-CET. The aircraft was 4 years and 6 months old.

The pilot-in-command was Captain Rafael Acchiardo Nissim. He had accumulated over 15,017 hours of flight time, with 782 on the BAe 146. The co-pilot was First Officer Juan Antonio Loyola Román; he had a total of 2,493 flight hours, 637 of them on the BAe 146.

== Accident ==
The flight departed Punta Arenas at 14:51 hours local time with no significant issues. At 15:15, the aircraft was cleared for a VOR A approach into Puerto Williams Airport on runway 26. Wind was given as 180° at 4 knots (4.6 mph; 2.1 m/s). Shortly, the air traffic controller announced the updated wind information, and the wind was 160° at 6 kn (6.9 mph; 3.1 m/s). Then the captain decided to perform a direct approach to runway 08. This was approved by air traffic control. The airplane touched down 427 m (1,401 ft) from the runway threshold at a speed of 112 kn (129 mph; 207 km/h). The V_{ref} was 110 kn (127 mph; 204 km/h), with the target touchdown speed of 103 kn (119 mph; 191 km/h). Then, the aircraft overran the runway and slid into the Beagle Channel.

== Investigation ==
The probable cause was found to be a failure of good planning made by the pilot during the approach when he decided to change runway and misapplication of the landing procedure. The weather conditions, negative slope, wet runway, wind and little braking action led to the overrun of the runway.
