= Avro International Aerospace =

- Formerly: Avro
- Type: Aircraft manufacturer
- Industry: Aerospace
- Predecessor: British Aerospace
- Founded: 1993
- Founder: British Aerospace
- Defunct: 1998 (via Aero International (Regional))
- Fate: Merged into Aero International (Regional), then dissolved
- Headquarters: Woodford Aerodrome, near Manchester, United Kingdom
- Products: Avro RJ70, Avro RJ85, Avro RJ100 (variants of the BAe 146)
- Brands: AIR (marketing brand via AI(R))
- Owner: British Aerospace (initially), then via AI(R)
- Parent: British Aerospace (initially), Aero International (Regional) (later)

Avro International Aerospace was a British aircraft manufacturer formed in 1993 by British Aerospace to consolidate production of the British Aerospace 146 at Woodford Aerodrome near Manchester. The company produced new variants of the 146 with updated engines and avionics as the Avro RJ70, Avro RJ85 and Avro RJ100 regional jets.

British Aerospace decided to split out some of its commercial aircraft activities into separate businesses and as a result Avro International was created, using the name of a predecessor company Avro. The company was to be set up as a 50/50 joint venture with the Taiwan Aerospace Corporation, which was to inject £120 million into the new company. It was the intention to set up a second production line in Taiwan but the finance was not available and the deal collapsed. British Aerospace decided to continue without outside investment due to the cost savings realised with the closure of the BAe 146 production line at Hatfield Aerodrome and the consolidation of production at Woodford.

In 1995 an agreement was signed to create a multi-national consortium named Aero International (Regional) (AI(R)) with the Franco-Italian Avions de Transport Regional (ATR) in 1996, to be based at Toulouse. As well as Avro it would also include the other British Aerospace regional aircraft division "Jetstream Aircraft" of Prestwick; Avro continued to build the regional jet family at Woodford but they were marketed under the AIR branding. AI(R) was disbanded only two years later.
