= FAAM Airborne Laboratory =

Atmospheric science research facility

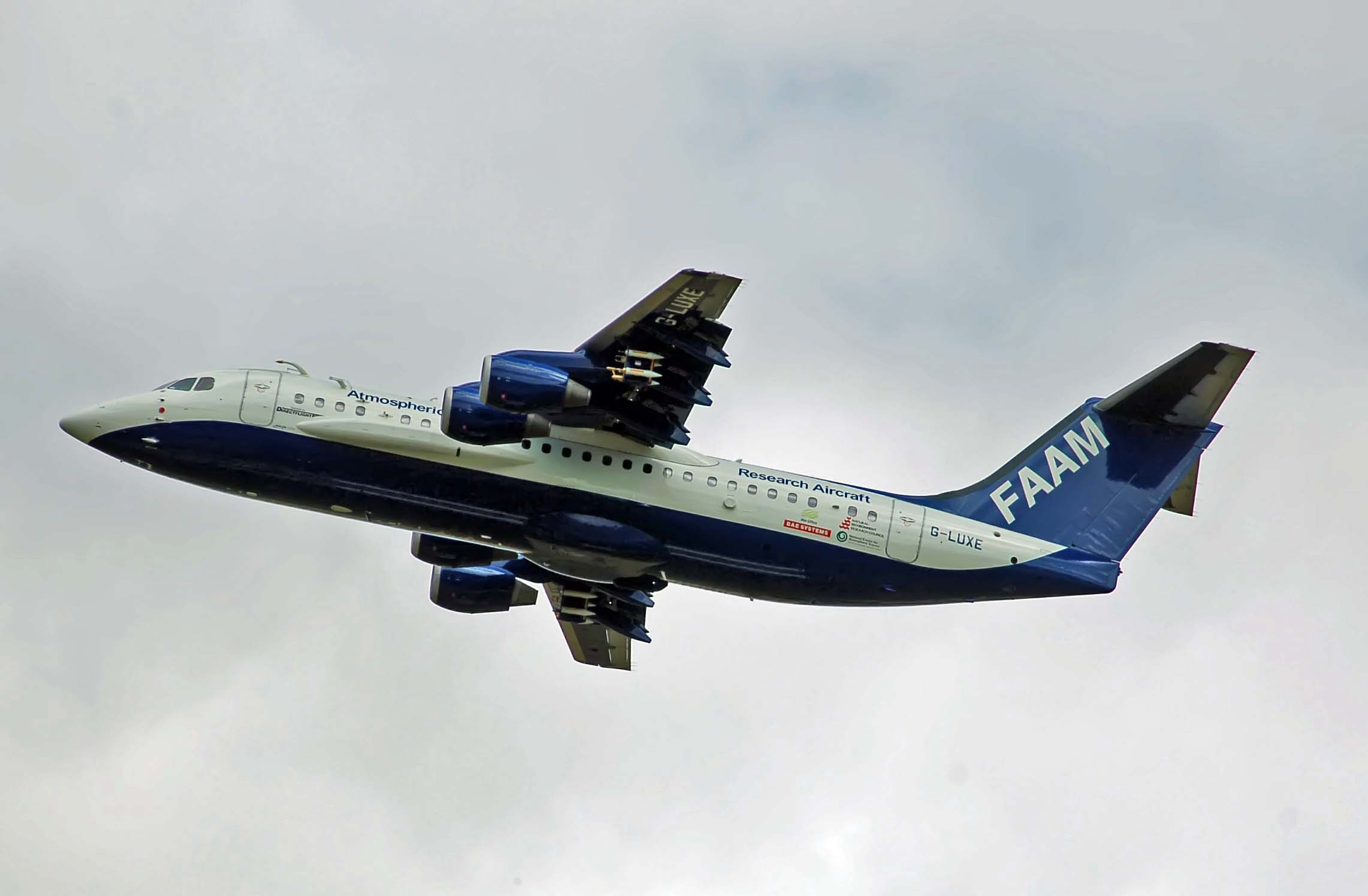
The FAAM research aircraft takes off at the Royal International Air Tattoo, England (2014)

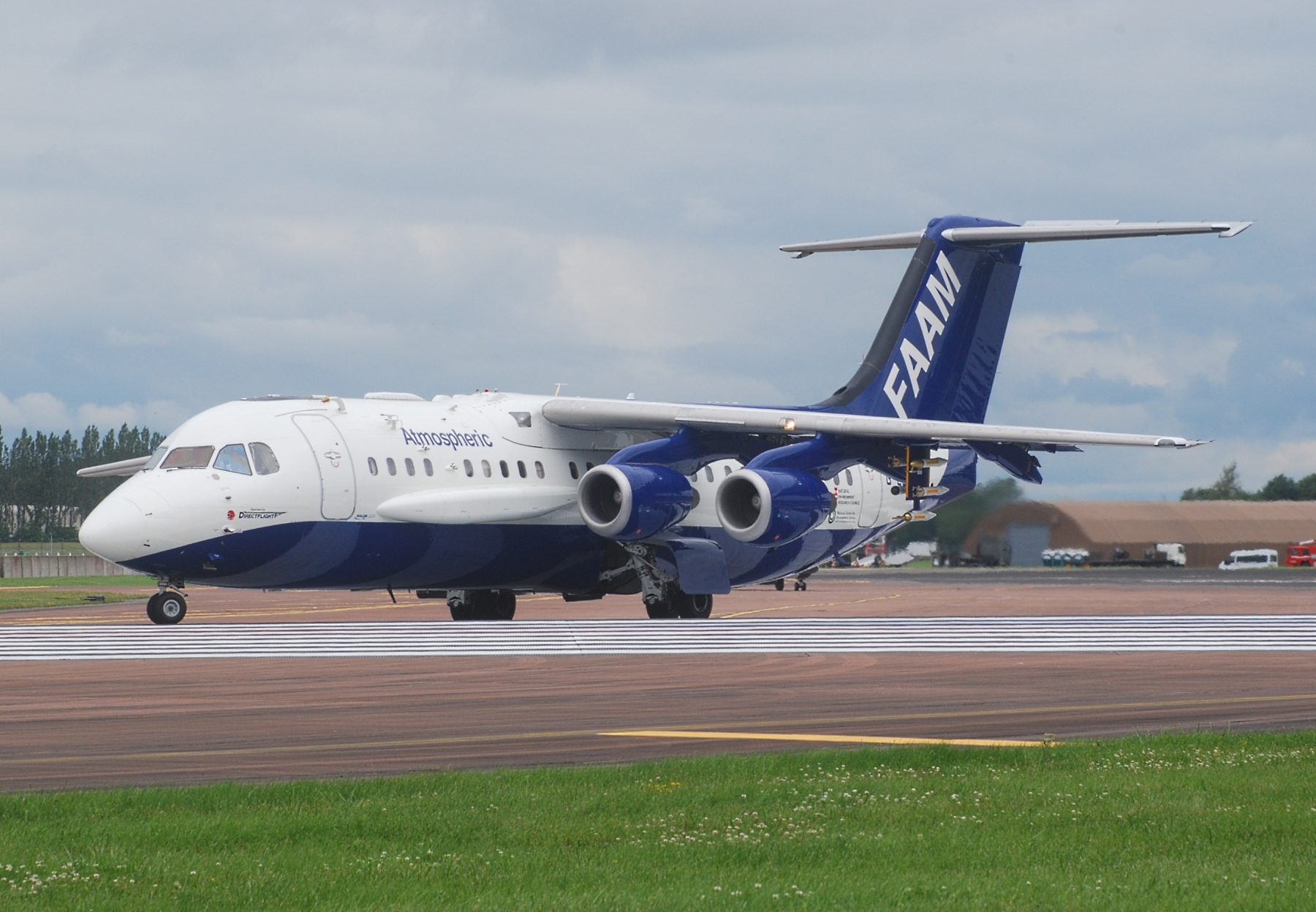
FAAM aircraft BAe 146 G-LUXE at RAF Fairford in 2012

The FAAM Airborne Laboratory was an atmospheric science research facility operating from 2004 to 2026. It was based on the Cranfield University campus alongside Cranfield Airport in Bedfordshire, England. It was formed by a collaboration between the Met Office and the Natural Environment Research Council (NERC) in 2001.

== The facility ==
FAAM was established jointly by the Natural Environmental Research Council and the Met Office. Initial funding was provided to prepare an aircraft for instrumentation. The main aircraft used was a modified BAe 146-301 aircraft, registration G-LUXE, owned by NERC and operated by Airtask.

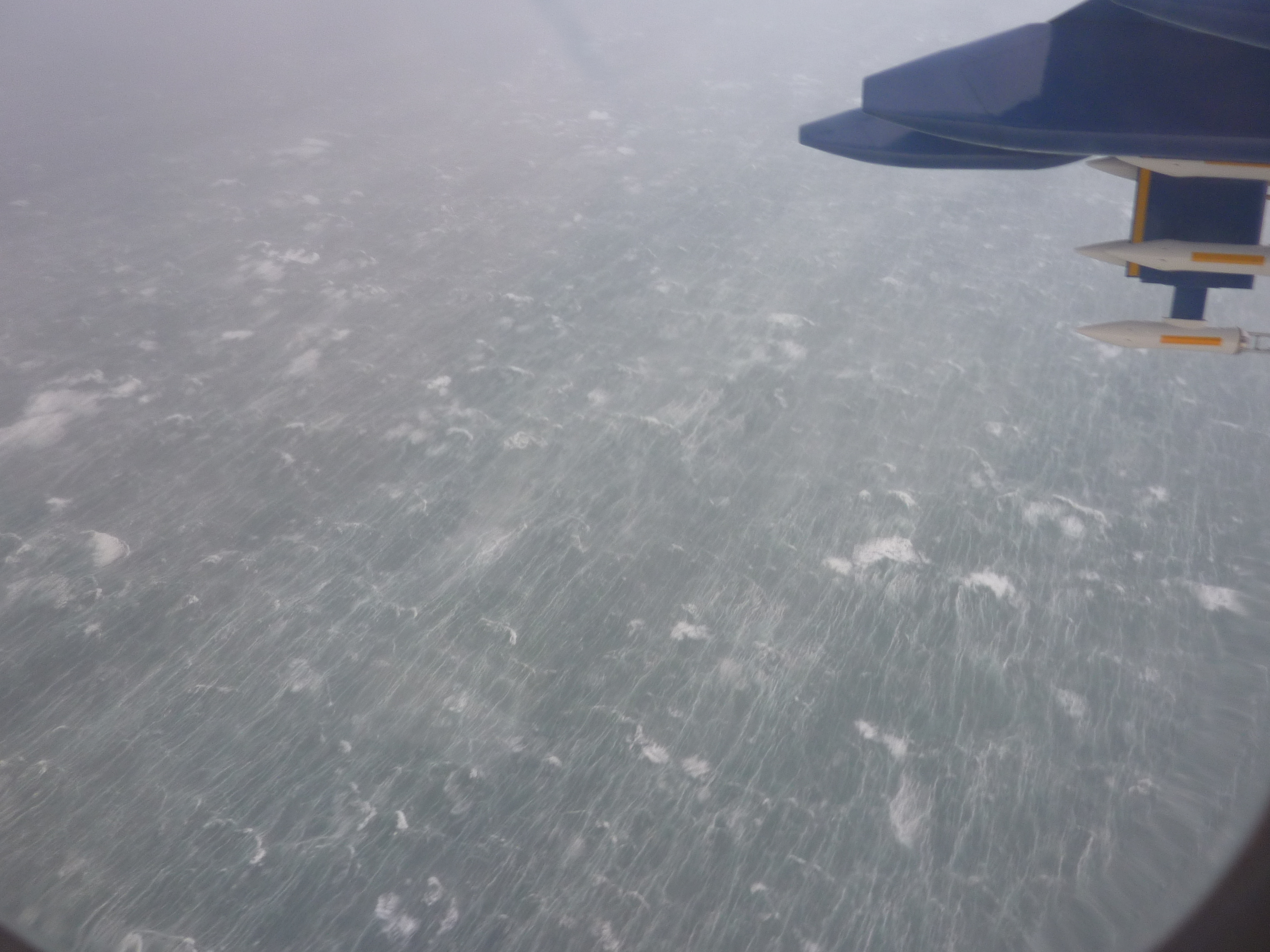
Churned up sea off the west coast of Scotland resulting from extra-tropical storm Friedhelm as photographed from the FAAM research aircraft at about 450 metres above sea level during a programme of storm research.

Work carried out by FAAM includes

- Radiative transfer studies in clear and cloudy air;
- Tropospheric chemistry measurements;
- Cloud physics and dynamic studies;
- Dynamics of mesoscale weather systems;
- Boundary layer and turbulence studies;
- Remote sensing: verification of ground-based instruments;
- Satellite ground truth: radiometric measurements and winds;
- Satellite instrument test-bed;

FAAM was staffed by a mixture of NERC, University of Leeds and Met Office personnel, and acted as a service for numerous UK and occasionally overseas science organisations; primarily the Met Office itself, or UK universities funded by NERC.

It flew around 400 hours annually, most commonly on large campaigns where a team of typically 30 would spend around a month at a base location, potentially anywhere in the world, delivering a specific science campaign, although flying from Cranfield also took place.

An emergency response role existed, which was used three times - at the 2005 Buncefield fire, the 2010 Eyjafjallajökull volcanic eruption and 2012 Total Elgin gas platform leak: after Eyjafjallajökull a new aircraft, MOCCA - the Met Office Civil Contingency Aircraft, has been commissioned as the "first responder" to British volcanic ash emergencies.

== History ==
The facility was originally established in 2001, with an intended operating base of the BAe site at Woodford, in Cheshire. However, by 2004 when the aircraft was delivered, BAe had decided to close Woodford, so eventually the facility was re-sited at Cranfield, although it initially had limited involvement with that university, the largest university customers being Manchester, Cambridge, Leeds and York. From 2016 FAAM was co-located in a new dedicated building with a new department of Atmospheric Informatics of Cranfield University.

From 2008 to 2014 FAAM was headed by Dr. Guy Gratton, an aeronautical engineer, and from 2014 to 2026 it was headed by Mr Alan Woolley, an instrumentation scientist.

The facility closed in 2026 following withdrawal of funding.
