= List of the busiest airports in Chile =

This is a list of the busiest airports in Chile by passenger and cargo traffic.

== 2023 ==
Source: Civil Aeronautics Board of Chile (Junta de Aeronáutica Civil), 2023.

=== Total passengers 2023 (JAN-NOV) ===
Rank	Airport	IATA code	Location	Passengers	Annual change	Rank change
1	Arturo Merino Benítez International Airport	SCL	Santiago	23'503,764	TBD% ▲	Steady
2	El Loa Airport	CJC	Calama	2'446,334	TBD% ▲	▲1
3	Andrés Sabella Gálvez International Airport	ANF	Antofagasta	2'414,018	TBD% ▲	▼1
4	Carriel Sur International Airport	CCP	Concepción	2'070,185	TBD% ▲	Steady
5	El Tepual Airport	PMC	Puerto Montt	1'807,014	TBD% ▲	▲1
6	La Florida Airport	LSC	La Serena	1'627,801	TBD% ▲	▲1
7	Diego Aracena International Airport	IQQ	Iquique	1'546,503	TBD% ▲	▼2
8	La Araucanía International Airport	ZCO	Temuco	1'018,574	TBD% ▲	▲1
9	Presidente Carlos Ibáñez del Campo International Airport	PUQ	Punta Arenas	849,668	TBD% ▲	▼1
10	Desierto de Atacama Airport	CPO	Copiapo	654,401	TBD% ▲	▲1
11	Chacalluta International Airport	ARI	Arica	611,362	TBD% ▲	▼1
12	Balmaceda Airport	BBA	Balmaceda	561,672	TBD% ▲	Steady
13	Pichoy Airport	ZAL	Valdivia	392,571	TBD% ▲	Steady
14	Canal Bajo Airport	ZOS	Osorno	329,886	TBD% ▲	Steady
15	Teniente Julio Gallardo Airport	PTN	Puerto Natales	211,342	TBD% ▲	New entry

== 2022 ==
Source: Civil Aeronautics Board of Chile (Junta de Aeronáutica Civil), 2022.

=== Total passengers 2022 ===
Rank	Airport	IATA code	Location	Passengers	Annual change	Rank change
1	Arturo Merino Benítez International Airport	SCL	Santiago	18'519,667	86.76% ▲	Steady
2	Andrés Sabella Gálvez International Airport	ANF	Antofagasta	1'998,660	33.11% ▲	Steady
3	El Loa Airport	CJC	Calama	1'786,552	38.49% ▲	▲1
4	Carriel Sur International Airport	CCP	Concepción	1'773,296	59.42% ▲	▲1
5	Diego Aracena International Airport	IQQ	Iquique	1'744,514	30.42% ▲	▼2
6	El Tepual Airport	PMC	Puerto Montt	1'693,975	54.35% ▲	Steady
7	La Florida Airport	LSC	La Serena	1'345,509	31.37% ▲	Steady
8	Presidente Carlos Ibáñez del Campo International Airport	PUQ	Punta Arenas	959,250	67.08% ▲	▲1
9	Temuco Maquehue Airport	ZCO	Temuco	916,239	47.78% ▲	▼1
10	Chacalluta International Airport	ARI	Arica	650,593	42.59% ▲	Steady
11	Desierto de Atacama Airport	CPO	Copiapo	650,055	TBD% ▲	▲1
12	Balmaceda Airport	BBA	Balmaceda	611,279	TBD% ▲	Steady
13	Pichoy Airport	ZAL	Valdivia	383,949	TBD% ▲	Steady
14	Canal Bajo Airport	ZOS	Osorno	239,342	TBD% ▲	Steady
15	Mocopulli Airport	MHC	Castro	147,083	TBD% ▲	▲1

== 2021 ==
Source: Civil Aeronautics Board of Chile (Junta de Aeronáutica Civil), 2021.

=== Total passengers 2021 ===
Rank	Airport	IATA code	Location	Passengers	Annual change	Rank change
1	Arturo Merino Benítez International Airport	SCL	Santiago	9'916,293	16.90% ▲	Steady
2	Andrés Sabella Gálvez International Airport	ANF	Antofagasta	1'501,513	36.98% ▲	Steady
3	Diego Aracena International Airport	IQQ	Iquique	1'337,638	53.46% ▲	▲1
4	El Loa Airport	CJC	Calama	1'290,063	32.04% ▲	▼1
5	Carriel Sur International Airport	CCP	Concepción	1'112,320	54.99% ▲	▲1
6	El Tepual Airport	PMC	Puerto Montt	1'097,463	35.04% ▲	▼1
7	La Florida Airport	LSC	La Serena	1'024,185	62.96% ▲	Steady
8	Temuco Maquehue Airport	CPO	Temuco	620,011	51.56% ▲	▲1
9	Presidente Carlos Ibáñez del Campo International Airport	PUQ	Punta Arenas	574,125	13.56% ▲	▼1
10	Chacalluta International Airport	ARI	Arica	456,253	26.28% ▲	Steady

== 2020 ==
Source: Civil Aeronautics Board of Chile (Junta de Aeronáutica Civil), 2020.

=== Total passengers 2020 ===
Rank	Airport	IATA code	Location	Passengers	Annual change	Rank change
1	Arturo Merino Benítez International Airport	SCL	Santiago	8,527,737	65.38% ▼	Steady
2	Andrés Sabella Gálvez International Airport	ANF	Antofagasta	1,096,183	49.79% ▼	Steady
3	El Loa Airport	CJC	Calama	976,996	56.83% ▼	Steady
4	Diego Aracena International Airport	IQQ	Iquique	871,652	43.26% ▼	▲1
5	El Tepual Airport	PMC	Puerto Montt	812,697	57.96% ▼	▼1
6	Carriel Sur International Airport	CCP	Concepción	717,670	55.64% ▼	Steady
7	La Florida Airport	LSC	La Serena	628,488	50.15% ▼	▲1
8	Presidente Carlos Ibáñez del Campo International Airport	PUQ	Punta Arenas	505,556	64.24% ▼	▼1
9	Temuco Maquehue Airport	CPO	Temuco	409,080	60.22% ▼	Steady
10	Chacalluta International Airport	ARI	Arica	361,252	60.28% ▼	Steady

== 2019 ==
Source: Civil Aeronautics Board of Chile (Junta de Aeronáutica Civil), 2019.

=== Total passengers 2019 ===
Rank	Airport	IATA code	Location	Passengers	Annual change	Rank change
1	Arturo Merino Benítez International Airport	SCL	Santiago	24'630,742	5.6% ▲	Steady
2	El Loa Airport	CJC	Calama	2'273,160	16.25% ▲	▲1
3	Cerro Moreno International Airport	ANF	Antofagasta	2'173,389	7.4% ▲	▼1
4	El Tepual Airport	PMC	Puerto Montt	1'933,553	8.5% ▲	Steady
5	Carriel Sur International Airport	CCP	Concepción	1'664,824	15.08% ▲	Steady
6	Diego Aracena International Airport	IQQ	Iquique	1'579,566	14.84% ▲	Steady
7	Presidente Carlos Ibáñez del Campo International Airport	PUQ	Punta Arenas	1'323,156	4.78% ▲	Steady
8	La Florida Airport	LSC	La Serena	1'260,780	19.29% ▲	Steady
9	Temuco Airport	CPO	Temuco	1'028,340	11.85% ▲	Steady
10	Chacalluta International Airport	ARI	Arica	909,427	10.82% ▲	Steady

== 2018 ==
Source: Civil Aeronautics Board of Chile (Junta de Aeronáutica Civil), 2018.

=== Total passengers 2018 ===
Rank	Airport	IATA code	Location	Passengers	Annual change	Rank change
1	Arturo Merino Benítez International Airport	SCL	Santiago	23,324,306	8.86% ▲	Steady
2	Cerro Moreno International Airport	ANF	Antofagasta	2,023,730	12.68% ▲	Steady
3	El Loa Airport	CJC	Calama	1,955,477	25.17% ▲	▲1
4	El Tepual Airport	PMC	Puerto Montt	1,782,004	11.61% ▲	▼1
5	Carriel Sur International Airport	CCP	Concepción	1,446,629	29.17% ▲	▲1
6	Diego Aracena International Airport	IQQ	Iquique	1,375,494	8.92% ▲	▼1
7	Presidente Carlos Ibáñez del Campo International Airport	PUQ	Punta Arenas	1,262,815	17.64% ▲	Steady
8	La Florida Airport	LSC	La Serena	1,056,939	30.30% ▲	Steady
9	Temuco Airport	CPO	Temuco	919,366	21.94% ▲	▲1
10	Chacalluta International Airport	ARI	Arica	820,656	8.85% ▲	▼1

== 2017 ==
Source: Civil Aeronautics Board of Chile (Junta de Aeronáutica Civil), 2017.

=== Total passengers 2017 ===
Rank	Airport	IATA code	Location	Passengers	Annual change	Rank change
1	Arturo Merino Benítez International Airport	SCL	Santiago	21,426,871	11.64% ▲	Steady
2	Cerro Moreno International Airport	ANF	Antofagasta	1,796,053	-5.57% ▼	Steady
3	El Tepual Airport	PMC	Puerto Montt	1,596,649	7.45% ▲	Steady
4	El Loa Airport	CJC	Calama	1,562,224	8.60% ▲	Steady
5	Diego Aracena International Airport	IQQ	Iquique	1,262,900	5.53% ▲	Steady
6	Carriel Sur International Airport	CCP	Concepción	1,119,977	15.96% ▲	▲1
7	Presidente Carlos Ibáñez del Campo International Airport	PUQ	Punta Arenas	1,073,452	7.88% ▲	▼1
8	La Florida Airport	LSC	La Serena	811,145	4.54% ▲	Steady
9	Chacalluta International Airport	ARI	Arica	764,924	8.86% ▲	Steady
10	Temuco Airport	CPO	Temuco	753,929	11.76% ▲	Steady

== 2016 ==
Source: Civil Aeronautics Board of Chile (Junta de Aeronáutica Civil), 2016.

=== Total passengers 2016 ===
Rank	Airport	IATA code	Location	Passengers	Annual change	Rank change
1	Arturo Merino Benítez International Airport	SCL	Santiago	19,192,488	11.39% ▲	Steady
2	Cerro Moreno International Airport	ANF	Antofagasta	1,901,976	-3.78% ▼	Steady
3	El Tepual Airport	PMC	Puerto Montt	1,485,959	14.78% ▲	▲1
4	El Loa Airport	CJC	Calama	1,438,476	5.97% ▲	▼1
5	Diego Aracena International Airport	IQQ	Iquique	1,196,675	3.58% ▲	Steady
6	Presidente Carlos Ibáñez del Campo International Airport	PUQ	Punta Arenas	994,971	17.92% ▲	▲1
7	Carriel Sur International Airport	CCP	Concepción	965,838	6.25% ▲	▼1
8	La Florida Airport	LSC	La Serena	775,928	2.13% ▲	Steady
9	Chacalluta International Airport	ARI	Arica	702,666	18.08% ▲	Steady
10	Temuco Airport	CPO	Temuco	674,596	17.25% ▲	Steady

== 2015 ==
Source: Civil Aeronautics Board of Chile (Junta de Aeronáutica Civil), 2015.

=== Total passengers 2015 ===
Rank	Airport	IATA code	Location	Passengers	Annual change	Rank change
1	Arturo Merino Benítez International Airport	SCL	Santiago	17,230,567	7.23% ▲	Steady
2	Cerro Moreno International Airport	ANF	Antofagasta	1,973,777	-5.02% ▼	Steady
3	El Loa Airport	CJC	Calama	1,357,426	-0.30% ▼	Steady
4	El Tepual Airport	PMC	Puerto Montt	1,294,623	1.71% ▲	Steady
5	Diego Aracena International Airport	IQQ	Iquique	1,155,306	-5.29% ▼	Steady
6	Carriel Sur International Airport	CCP	Concepción	909,032	-5.85% ▼	Steady
7	Presidente Carlos Ibáñez del Campo International Airport	PUQ	Punta Arenas	819,035	5.85% ▲	Steady
8	La Florida Airport	LSC	La Serena	759,746	4.76% ▲	Steady
9	Chacalluta International Airport	ARI	Arica	595,055	0.28% ▲	Steady
10	Temuco Airport	CPO	Temuco	575,335	N/A% ▲	▲2

== 2014 ==
Source: Civil Aeronautics Board of Chile (Junta de Aeronáutica Civil), 2014.

=== Total passengers 2014 ===
Rank	Airport	IATA code	Location	Passengers	Annual change	Rank change
1	Arturo Merino Benítez International Airport	SCL	Santiago	16,068,242	4.93% ▲	Steady
2	Cerro Moreno International Airport	ANF	Antofagasta	2,078,126	11.49% ▲	Steady
3	El Loa Airport	CJC	Calama	1,361,392	-5.57% ▼	Steady
4	El Tepual Airport	PMC	Puerto Montt	1,272,832	3.92% ▲	▲1
5	Diego Aracena International Airport	IQQ	Iquique	1,219,799	-2.44% ▼	▼1
6	Carriel Sur International Airport	CCP	Concepción	965,470	2.90% ▲	Steady
7	Presidente Carlos Ibáñez del Campo International Airport	PUQ	Punta Arenas	773,732	4.45% ▲	Steady
8	La Florida Airport	LSC	La Serena	725,247	9.39% ▲	Steady
9	Chacalluta International Airport	ARI	Arica	593,367	4.98% ▲	▲1
10	Desierto de Atacama Airport	CPO	Copiapó	539,983	-9.68% ▼	▼1

== 2013 ==
Source: Civil Aeronautics Board of Chile (Junta de Aeronáutica Civil), 2013.

=== Total passengers 2013 ===
Rank	Airport	IATA code	Location	Passengers	Annual change	Rank change
1	Arturo Merino Benítez International Airport	SCL	Santiago	15,312,649	7,7% ▲	Steady
2	Cerro Moreno International Airport	ANF	Antofagasta	1,863,907	18,0% ▲	Steady
3	El Loa Airport	CJC	Calama	1,441,656	34,6% ▲	▲2
4	Diego Aracena International Airport	IQQ	Iquique	1,250,315	7,8% ▲	▼ -1
5	El Tepual Airport	PMC	Puerto Montt	1,224,814	9,6% ▲	▼ -1
6	Carriel Sur International Airport	CCP	Concepción	938,276	9,6% ▲	Steady
7	Presidente Carlos Ibáñez del Campo International Airport	PUQ	Punta Arenas	740,701	9,8% ▲	Steady
8	La Florida Airport	LSC	La Serena	662,999	9,3% ▲	Steady
9	Desierto de Atacama Airport	CPO	Copiapó	597,841	16,0% ▲	Steady
10	Chacalluta International Airport	ARI	Arica	565,204	14,1% ▲	Steady
