= Diego Aracena International Airport =

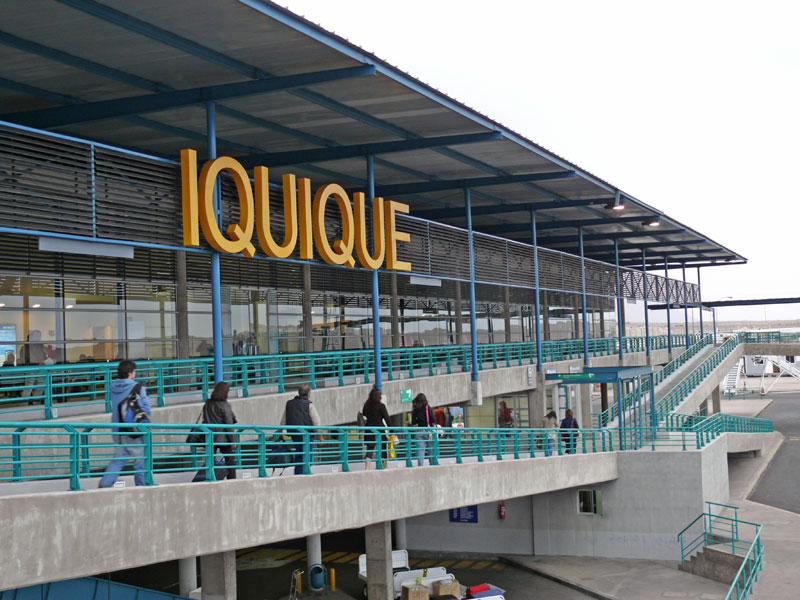
- IATA: IQQ; ICAO: SCDA

Summary
- Airport type: Public / military
- Operator: A-port Operaciones S.A.
- Serves: Iquique, Chile
- Location: Chucumata
- Elevation AMSL: 156 ft (48 m)
- Coordinates: 20°32′08″S 70°10′53″W

Map
- Location of the airport in Chile

Runways
Direction	Length		Surface
Direction	m	ft	Surface
01/19	3,350	10,991	Asphalt
- Source: WAD, GCM, STV

Diego Aracena International Airport (Spanish: Aeropuerto Internacional Diego Aracena) (IATA: IQQ, ICAO: SCDA) is an airport serving Iquique, capital of the Tarapacá Region in Chile. The airport is on the Pacific coast, 48 kilometres (30 mi) south of the city. It shares a runway with Los Cóndores Air Base, home to the First Air Brigade of the Chilean Air Force.

== Airlines and destinations ==
=== Passenger ===
Airlines	Destinations
Boliviana de Aviación	La Paz
JetSmart Chile	Antofagasta, Arica, Concepción, La Serena, Santiago de Chile
LATAM Chile	Arica, Santiago de Chile
Sky Airline	Santiago de Chile

=== Cargo ===
Airlines	Destinations
LATAM Cargo Chile	Amsterdam, Campinas

== See also ==
- Transport in Chile
- List of airports in Chile
