= Presidente Carlos Ibáñez del Campo International Airport =

Presidente Carlos Ibáñez International Airport Aeropuerto Internacional Presidente Carlos Ibáñez
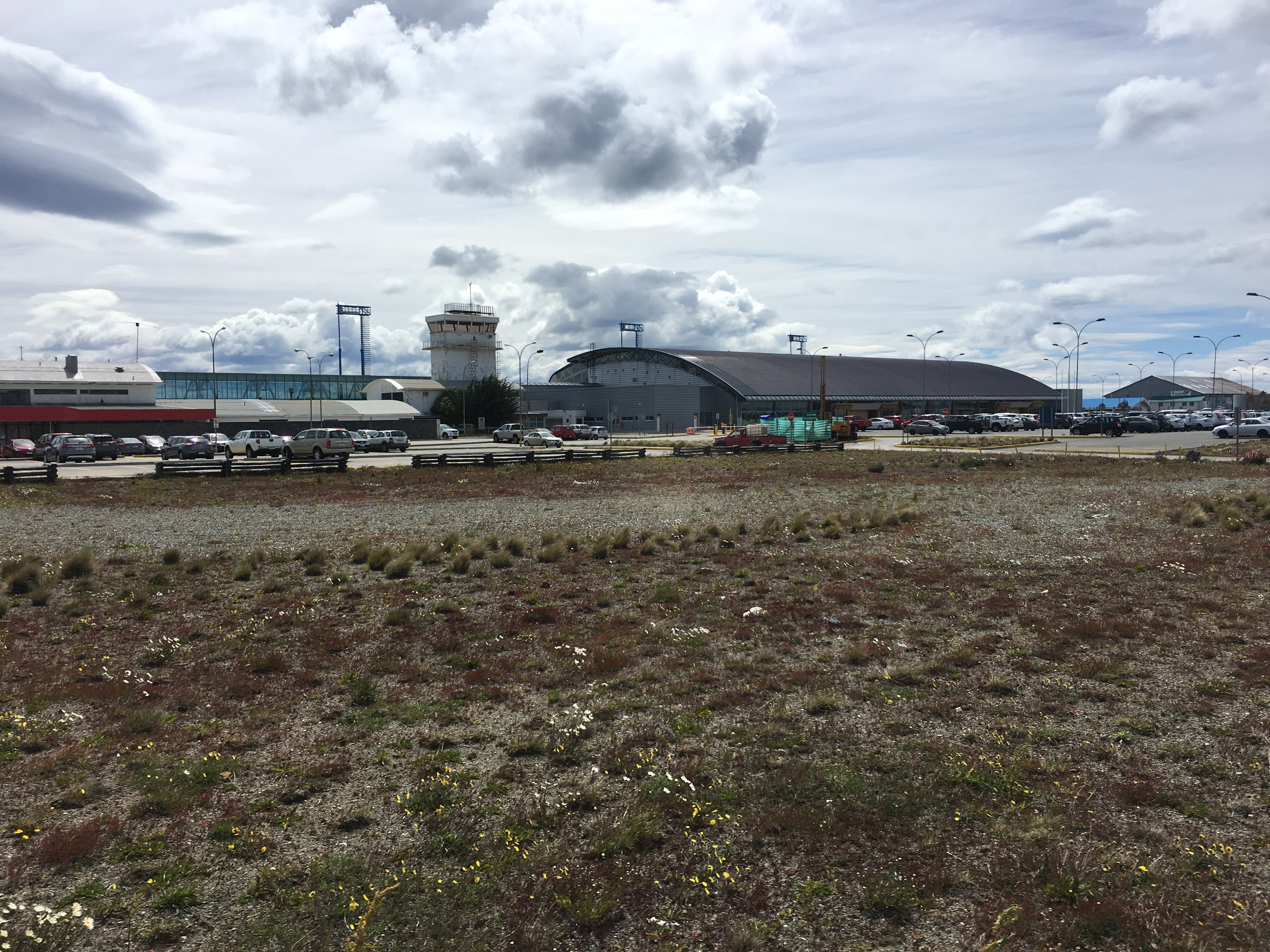
- IATA: PUQ; ICAO: SCCI; WMO: 85934

Summary
- Airport type: Public / military
- Serves: Punta Arenas, Chile
- Elevation AMSL: 139 ft / 42 m
- Coordinates: 53°00′09″S 070°51′16″W

Map
- Location of airport in Chile PUQ (South America)

Runways
Direction	Length		Surface
Direction	m	ft	Surface
01/19	1,678	5,504	Asphalt/Concrete
07/25	2,790	9,154	Asphalt/Concrete
12/30	2,400	7,857	Asphalt/Concrete

Statistics (2019)
- Passenger numbers: 1,323,156
- Source: DAFIF

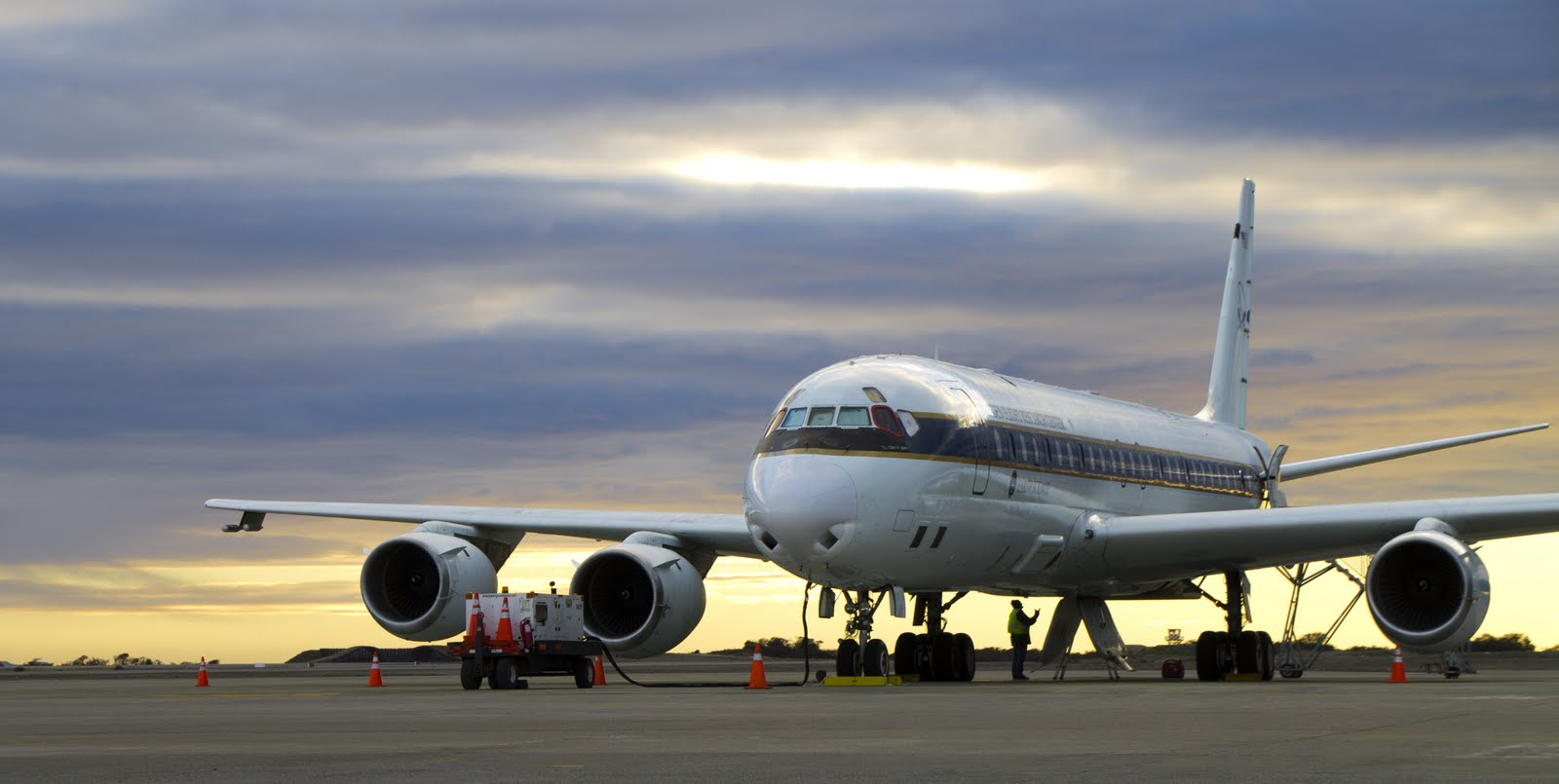
The NASA DC-8 sits on the ramp at Punta Arenas airport, Chile, during pre-flight procedures during the 2012 Antarctic campaign for IceBridge project

Presidente Carlos Ibáñez International Airport (Spanish: Aeropuerto Internacional Presidente Carlos Ibáñez) (IATA: PUQ, ICAO: SCCI) is an airport serving the city of Punta Arenas in southern Chile in the Patagonia region of South America. The airport is shared with the Chilean Air Force. Its passenger terminal has three departure gates, two luggage belts, and 11 check-in counters.

== Airlines and destinations ==
Airlines	Destinations
Aerovías DAP	Balmaceda, Porvenir, Puerto Natales, Puerto Williams
JetSmart Chile	Concepción, Puerto Montt, Santiago de Chile
LATAM Chile	Concepción, Puerto Montt, Rio Gallegos, Santiago de Chile, Stanley–Mount Pleasant; Seasonal: Puerto Natales
Sky Airline	Puerto Montt, Santiago de Chile
