= Arturo Merino Benítez International Airport =

International airport serving Santiago, Chile

Arturo Merino Benítez International Airport Aeropuerto Internacional Arturo Merino Benítez
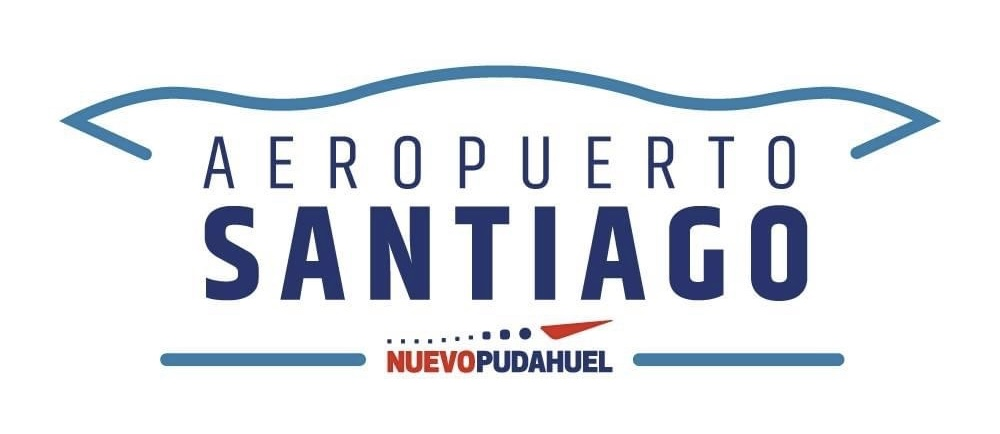

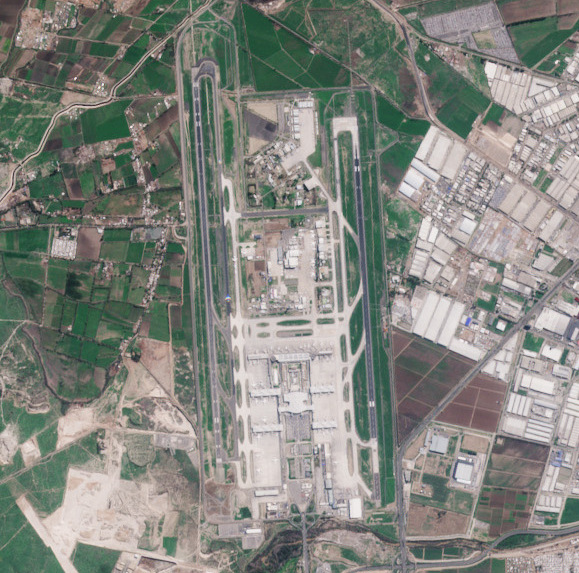
- Satellite view of the airport in 2022
- IATA: SCL; ICAO: SCEL; WMO: 85574

Summary
- Airport type: Public / military
- Owner: Ministry of Public Works
- Operator: Nuevo Pudahuel (consortium of Astaldi, Aéroports de Paris and Vinci Airports)
- Serves: Santiago Metropolitan Region
- Location: Pudahuel, Santiago Metropolitan Region, Chile
- Opened: February 9, 1967; 59 years ago
- Hub for: LATAM Chile; JetSmart; Sky Airline
- Elevation AMSL: 1,555 ft (474 m)
- Coordinates: 33°23′34″S 70°47′08″W
- Website: www.nuevopudahuel.cl

Map
- Location of airport in Chile

Runways
Direction	Length		Surface
Direction	m	ft	Surface
17R/35L	3,800	12,467	Asphalt
17L/35R	3,800	12,467	Asphalt

Statistics (2024)
- Total passengers: 25,840,584
- ILS category/runway: CAT II & IIIb / 17L
- Passenger statistics from Groupe ADP

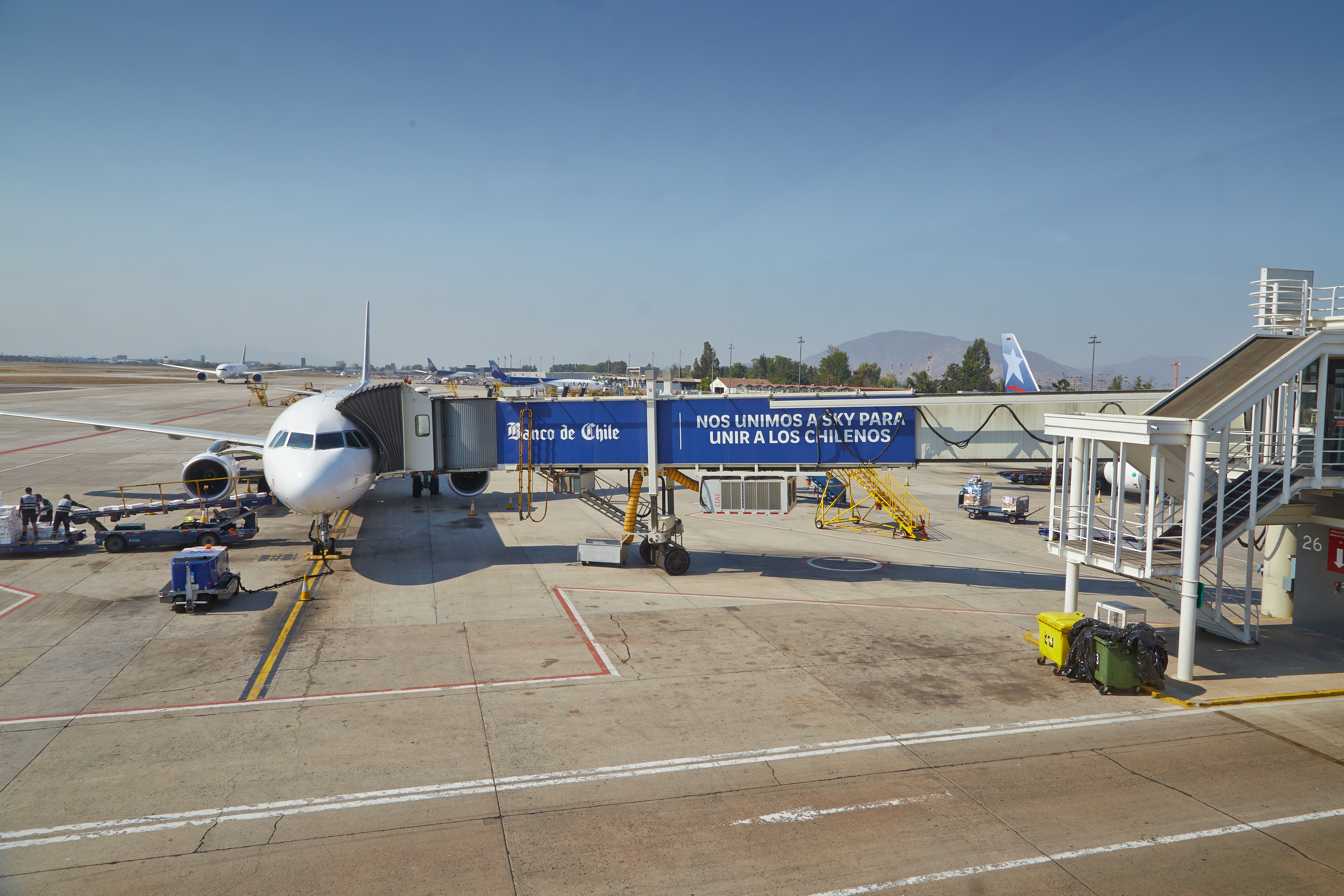
View of the tarmac

Arturo Merino Benítez International Airport (Note: Spanish: Aeropuerto Internacional Arturo Merino Benítez) (IATA: SCL, ICAO: SCEL), also known as Santiago International Airport (Note: Spanish: Aeropuerto Internacional de Santiago de Chile) and Nuevo Pudahuel Airport, (Note: Spanish: Aeropuerto Nuevo Pudahuel) located in Pudahuel, 15 km (9.3 mi) north-west of central Santiago, is Chile's largest aviation facility and busiest international airport.

The airport has domestic and international services to destinations in Europe, Oceania, Africa (cargo only), Asia and the Americas. In 2011, it was the ninth busiest airport in Latin America and the sixth busiest in South America by passenger traffic. It was the seventh busiest airport in Latin America by aircraft movements, serving 124,799 operations. Its location in Chile's most populated area, as well as in the central part of the country, makes it an ideal main hub and maintenance center for most local airlines such as LATAM and Sky Airline. LATAM Airlines accounts for approximately 82% of the airport's total commercial operations.

The airport is owned by the Chilean government and has been operated since October 2015 by Nuevo Pudahuel, a consortium of companies formed by Aéroports de Paris (France), Vinci Airports (France) and Astaldi (Italy). Air traffic control is handled by the Directorate General of Civil Aviation. Its ICAO category is 4F. The airport functions as a joint civil-military facility. It is the headquarters of the Chilean Air Force 2nd Air Brigade, and is where its 10th Aviation Group is based.

Santiago International is the longest non-stop destination for most European carriers including Iberia, Air France, and British Airways from their respective hubs in Madrid–Barajas Airport, Paris–Charles de Gaulle, and London–Heathrow Airport. The airport is also Latin America's main gateway to Oceania, with scheduled flights to Sydney, Melbourne, Auckland, and Easter Island.

== History ==
=== Early years ===
The demands of the growing metropolitan area of Santiago and the need for modern, jet-era airport facilities, which could safely accommodate both domestic and intercontinental flights, drove the need to relocate the Chilean capital's principal airport from Los Cerrillos Airport (ICAO: SCTI; IATA: ULC) in the denser southwest metropolitan region of Santiago to the more rural northwest metropolitan area.

Construction of the original terminal building, the eastern runway (17L/35R), control tower, east apron and cargo facilities commenced in 1961. On February 2, 1967, the airport was commissioned Aeropuerto Internacional de Pudahuel, due to its location in the municipality of Pudahuel. On March 19, 1980, the airport was rechristened Arturo Merino Benítez International Airport in honour of the founder of the Chilean Air Force and Chilean carrier LATAM Chile (Formerly Linea Aerea Nacional, LAN Chile).

=== 1994 expansion ===
The facility was expanded in 1994 with a new international terminal that covered 90,000 square meters, inspired by the architecture of Marseille Provence Airport in France. The building is located between the two parallel runways. This expansion added a new control tower, jetways, a duty-free zone, hotel, and greater parking area. The old terminal was used for domestic flights until 2001, when all passenger operations were merged into the same building.

In 2000, Lan Chile joined Oneworld, making of Arturo Merino Benitez Airport a main hub for the alliance, its first one in Latin America and its second in the Southern Hemisphere (after Qantas' Sydney Kingsford Smith International Airport in Australia). As of April 2014, 71% of international and 75% of domestic passengers were carried by Oneworld member airlines. During the 2010 Chile earthquake, the passenger terminal building suffered internal damages and the collapse of a pedestrian bridge between the vehicle ramp and the departures area. Nevertheless, both runways and control tower were unharmed, allowing the realization of a massive humanitarian air-bridge held by the Chilean Air Force to Concepción, Chile (Carriel Sur International Airport), close to the most damaged area by this earthquake and subsequent tsunami. The airport authority had closed off all commercial flight operations after around 1200 UTC on February 27, resuming full operations on March 3, 2010.

In 2011, IATA recognized the DGAC (Chile's provider of air navigation services) and SCL (Santiago Airport) with the Exceptional Recognition Award to the cooperative efforts of SCL and DGAC Chile that facilitated a quick recovery from the devastation that followed the Chilean earthquake on 27 February 2010. "Both airport and air navigation services were restored quickly with no impact on rates or charges for passengers or airlines. DGAC Chile and SCL are widely regarded as leaders in Latin America for efficiency, quality, and customer focus.

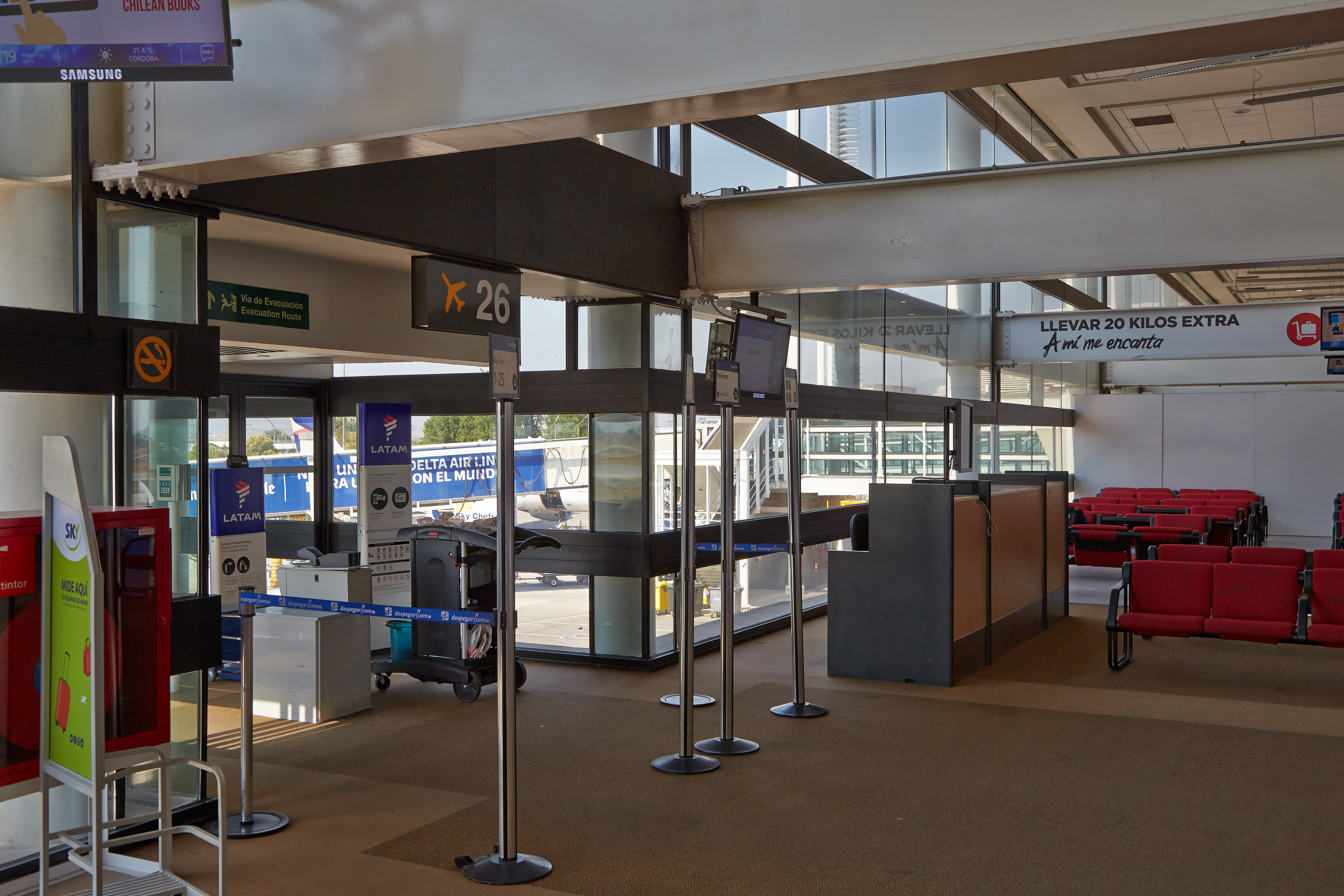
Departure gates

In June 2011, Santiago International Airport received the Air Cargo Excellence Award, as the best Latin American Cargo Airport.

=== Second runway ===
Construction on Runway 17R/35L began in 2004 and opened to traffic in September 2005. However, within months, defects were discovered and the runway required repairing, completed in January 2006. Further study of the problem discovered that the initial repairs were insufficient, needing additional work. Finally, 17R/35L reopened for traffic in March 2007.

=== 2020 master plan and expansion ===
In 2008, the airport terminal reached its maximum design capacity of 9.5 million annual passengers, two years earlier than forecast, and with the repairs needed after the 2010 Chile earthquake, the Ministry of Public Works announced in 2012 that it would call for proposals for the expansion and administration of the airport, two years prior to the end of the contract with the current operator.

The ministry decided to investigate a new airport master plan instead of an expansion of the single passenger terminal building, as initially proposed by the current operator. The feasibility studies for this master plan cost 4,560 million Chilean pesos (US$9.4 million) considered in the 2011 fiscal budget.

For this new master plan, the government hired the consultancy services of Aéroports de Paris Ingeniérie (ADP-I), the architecture, engineering and technical branch of the French airport corporation.

The master plan took into account a capacity growth to 14 million annual passengers by 2014, thirty-four million by year 2034 and 50 million passengers by 2045. New detached passenger terminal buildings for international and domestic flights, additional commercial areas and the construction of a light railway connecting the airport with the Santiago Metro network were considered.

In June 2013, the Chilean Ministry of Public Works started Phase 1 of the airport expansion.

On February 4, 2015, the consortium "Nuevo Pudahuel", formed by French companies Aéroports de Paris (45%), Vinci Airports (40%) and Italian infrastructure company Astaldi (15%) won the bidding process to manage and develop the airport for 20 years since October 1, 2015. The main missions of the new administration will be "the renovation of existing installations with the redesign and extension of the current terminal (Terminal 1); the funding, design and construction of a new 175,000-square-meter terminal (Terminal 2) which will increase the airport's capacity to 30 million passengers, with potential for expansion beyond 45 million; the operation and commercial development for the duration of the concession (20 years) of the main infrastructures: existing terminal and new terminals, car parks and future property developments. Building works will be executed by Astaldi (50% of conception-construction pool) and Vinci Construction Grands Projets (50%)". The new Terminal 2 was opened in 2022.

== Facilities ==
=== Terminal 1 – domestic flights ===
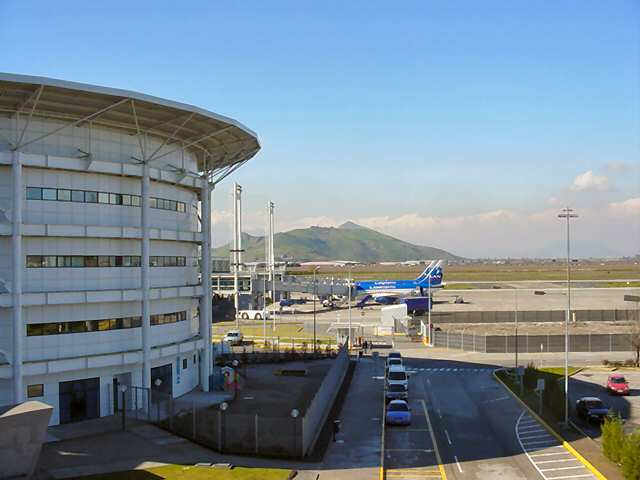
View of the domestic terminal

The terminal building, originally built for both domestic and international operations until 2021, has four levels:

- Ground floor: Arrivals, duty-free shop, baggage claim, transport services, parking areas, hotel access
- First floor: Administrative offices, VIP lounges (access through the second floor)
- Second floor: Departures, check-in & baggage drop off hall, shops, restaurants, boarding gates
- Third floor: Restaurants and VIP check-in areas (LATAM)

Terminal 1 hosts a bank office, Chilean Automobile Club, telecommunication companies (Claro, Movistar and Entel PCS), pharmacy, travel agencies, airlines offices, insurance offices and a police station (Carabineros de Chile).

=== Terminal 2 – international flights ===
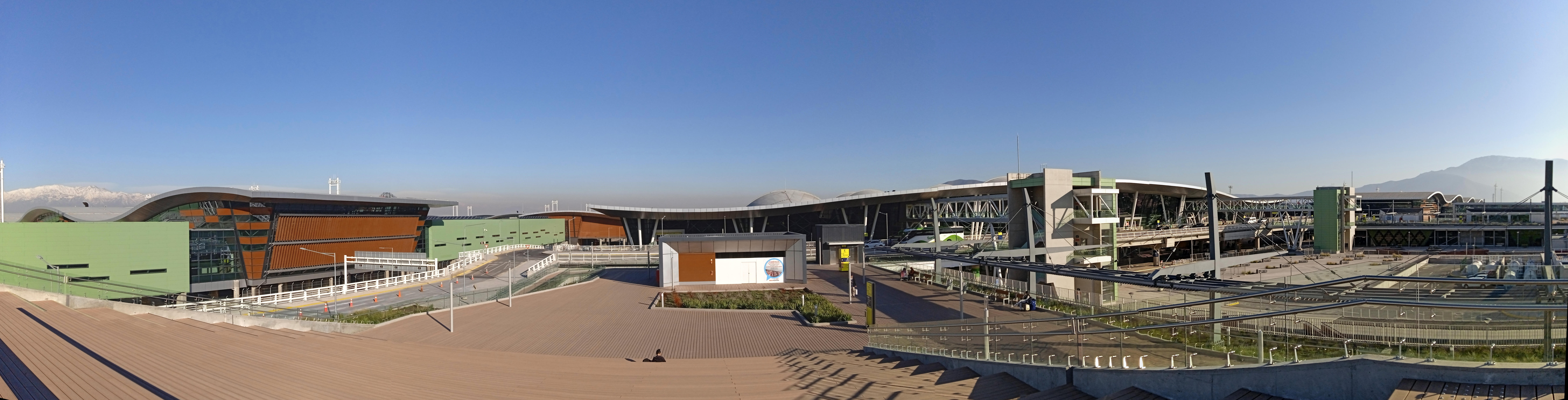
Terminal 2

The new international terminal covers more than 200,000 square meters. It involved an investment of $900 million USD. Construction started in August 2016 and ended in March 2021, increasing the total airport capacity from 16 to 38 million passengers per year. The core of the new terminal consists of a central processor (T2M) where passengers undertake arrivals and departures procedures, as well as four piers where the departure lounges are located.

==== Pier C ====
Pier C is a structure that has 10 boarding bridges, on a surface of more than 23,700 square metres of serviceable area, and 27,600 square metres of constructed area. It opened its doors in December 2018. Its internal design and green colour are inspired by Easter Island (Rapa Nui). The pier has more than 1,900 square metres dedicated to retail space, of which 250 square metres are allocated to Duty Free areas. The structure also has PRM assistance zones.

==== Pier D ====
Pier D features 10 loading bridges covering an area of over 22,000 square meters and opened its doors in July 2021. Passengers are able to reach Pier D directly from the "Main Unit" (T2M) and it is a place for both domestic and international flights. The building also features commercial and gastronomic premises, a playground, an area for art and culture and aid stations for passengers with reduced mobility. The space is inspired by the Atacama region, mirrored in its range of warm colors and panels inspired by the light, energy and strength of northern Chile.

==== Pier E ====
Pier E has 12 passenger boarding bridges on a surface of more than 26,700 square metres and opened during the second half of 2019. The pier has more than 1,600 square metres dedicated to retail space, of which 250 square metres are allocated to Duty Free areas. The structure will also have PRM assistance zones. It has been inspired by the region of Los Lagos (Lake District), and this is reflected in the structure's blue palette and decorative panels.

==== Pier F ====
Pier F has 10 loading bridges in an area of over 21,000 square meters and was opened in July 2021. Passengers reach pier F directly from the "Main Unit" (T2M) and it is entirely used for international flights. The building also features commercial and gastronomic premises, a playground, an art and culture area and aid stations for passengers with reduced mobility. The space is based on Patagonia, mirrored in its range of cold colors and panels inspired by the freshness, cleanliness and calm of southern Chile.

=== Hotels ===
- Holiday Inn Hotels finished the construction of a five-floor building in July 2007, internally connected to both terminals (international and domestic). The hotel has 112 rooms, restaurants, bars, room-service, a conference hall for 170 people, gym, covered swimming pool, spa and wi-fi internet access.
- Hotel Diego de Almagro is located 2 km outside the airport area.
- The Hilton Garden Inn Santiago Airport Hotel is located 2.8 km from the Santiago International Airport within the ENEA, one of the largest business complexes in Santiago de Chile which hosts offices, industry and entertainment. The hotel has 144 rooms, a fitness center, indoor swimming pool, sauna, seven meeting spaces including a ballroom and business center.
- The LQ Hotel Santiago Airport (La Quinta Inns & Suites) is under construction and will be the newest hotel near the airport and the first LQ Hotel in Chile. The hotel is located 2.8 km from Santiago International Airport. The hotel will have a restaurant, indoor swimming pool, fitness center, wifi, business center and meeting space.

=== Maintenance facilities ===
American Airlines operates a widebody aircraft maintenance facility at the airport, opened in November 2018. The facility holds maintenance hangars, a classroom, offices, parts storage, and tarmac space for two Boeing 777s/787s.

== Military functions ==
The airport is the headquarters of the Chilean Air Force II Air Brigade and hosts the 10th Aviation Group facilities. The 10th Aviation Group provides Strategic Air Transportation, air transportation of the President of Chile, emergency medical air transport, and supervises the Airborne Early Warning & Control Squadron. Some of its units are C-130 Hercules, Boeing 767-300, Boeing 737 Classic, Gulfstream IV, CASA C-212 Aviocar, F-16 Fighting Falcon, AEW&C Condor and Boeing E-3 Sentry.

The FIDAE (Feria Internacional del Aire y del Espacio), Latin America's most important air show, takes place in the 10th Aviation Group facilities.

== Airlines and destinations ==
=== Passenger ===
Airlines	Destinations
Aerolíneas Argentinas	Buenos Aires–Aeroparque, Mendoza
Aeroméxico	Mexico City–Benito Juárez
Air Canada	Seasonal: Montréal–Trudeau, Toronto–Pearson
Air France	Paris–Charles de Gaulle
American Airlines	Miami; Seasonal: Dallas/Fort Worth
Arajet	Punta Cana
Avianca	Bogotá; Seasonal: Cartagena
Boliviana de Aviación	La Paz, Santa Cruz
British Airways	Buenos Aires–Ezeiza (begins 28 March 2027), London–Heathrow
Copa Airlines	Panama City–Tocumen
Delta Air Lines	Atlanta
Iberia	Madrid
JetSmart Argentina	Buenos Aires–Aeroparque, Buenos Aires–Ezeiza
JetSmart Chile	Antofagasta, Arica, Bogotá, Buenos Aires–Ezeiza, Calama, Cali, Castro, Concepción, Copiapó, Florianópolis, Iquique, La Serena, Lima, Medellín–JMC, Mendoza, Montevideo, Puerto Montt, Punta Arenas, Rio de Janeiro–Galeão, Temuco, Trujillo; Seasonal: Curitiba, Foz do Iguaçu, Puerto Natales
KLM	Amsterdam, Buenos Aires–Ezeiza
LATAM Brasil	Brasília, Montevideo, Recife, São Paulo–Guarulhos
LATAM Chile	Antofagasta, Arica, Auckland, Belo Horizonte–Confins, Bogotá, Buenos Aires–Aeroparque, Buenos Aires–Ezeiza, Calama, Cancún, Caracas (resumes 3 January 2027), Concepción, Copiapó, Córdoba (AR), Coyhaique, Curitiba, Easter Island, Florianópolis, Iquique, La Paz, La Serena, Lima, Los Angeles, Madrid, Melbourne, Mendoza, Mexico City–Benito Juárez, Miami, Montevideo, Neuquén, New York–JFK, Osorno, Porto Alegre, Puerto Montt, Punta Arenas, Punta Cana, Quito (resumes 1 December 2026), Rio de Janeiro–Galeão, Recife, Santa Cruz de la Sierra–Viru Viru, São Paulo–Guarulhos, Stanley–Mount Pleasant, Sydney–Kingsford Smith, Temuco; Seasonal: Orlando, Puerto Natales, Punta del Este, San Carlos de Bariloche
LATAM Ecuador	Guayaquil
LATAM Paraguay	Asunción
LATAM Perú	Cusco, Lima
Level	Barcelona
Qantas	Sydney–Kingsford Smith
Sky Airline	Antofagasta, Arica, Buenos Aires–Aeroparque, Buenos Aires–Ezeiza, Calama, Castro, Concepción, Copiapó, Coyhaique, Florianópolis, Iquique, La Serena, Lima, Mendoza, Montevideo, Osorno, Puerto Montt, Punta Arenas, Rio de Janeiro–Galeão, Salvador da Bahia, São Paulo–Guarulhos, Temuco, Valdivia; Seasonal: Belo Horizonte–Confins, Brasília, El Calafate, Puerto Natales, San Carlos de Bariloche
Sky Airline Peru	Cusco (begins 3 January 2027)
Turkish Airlines	Istanbul, São Paulo–Guarulhos
United Airlines	Seasonal: Houston–Intercontinental

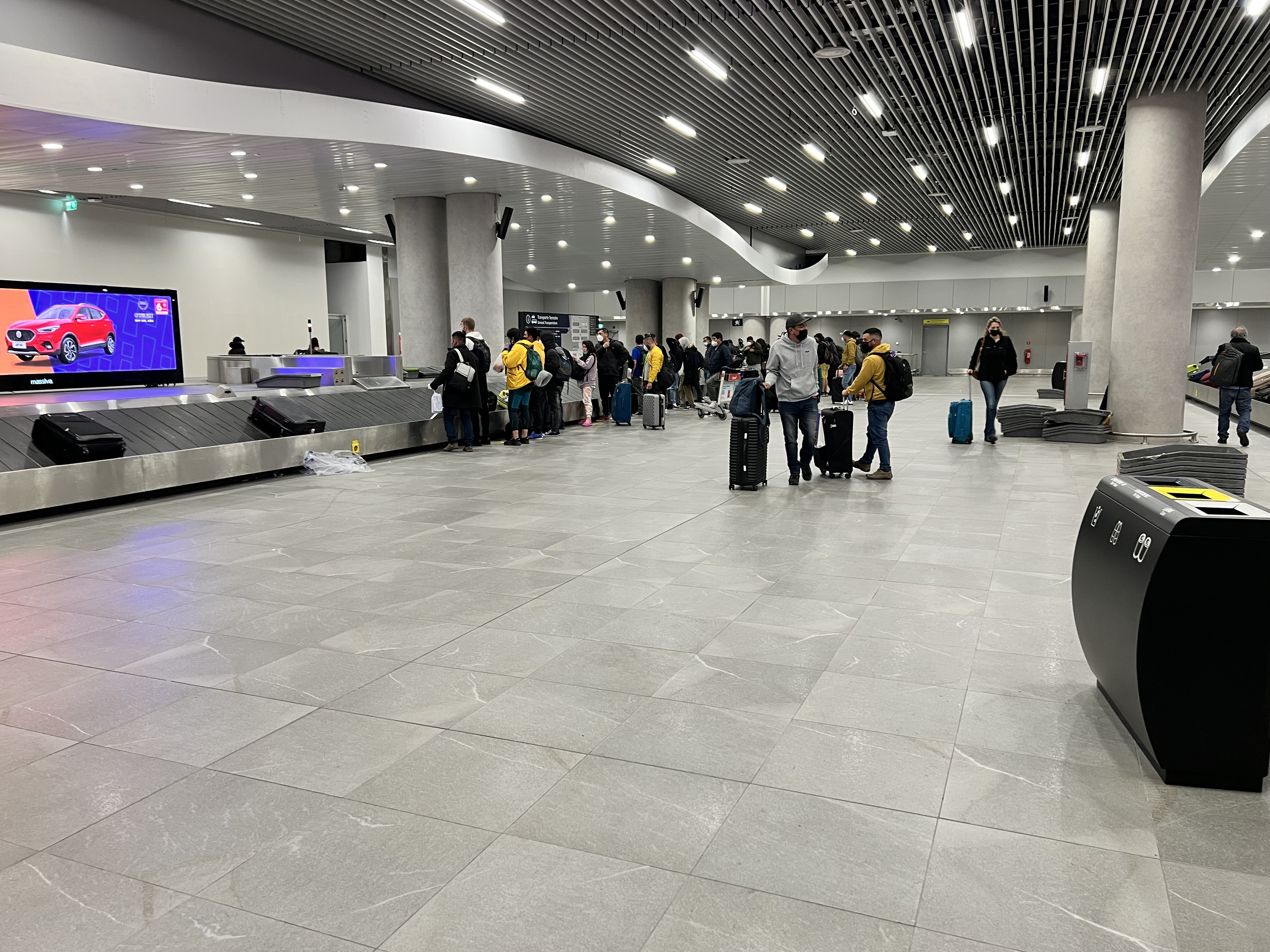
Baggage claim area at International Terminal

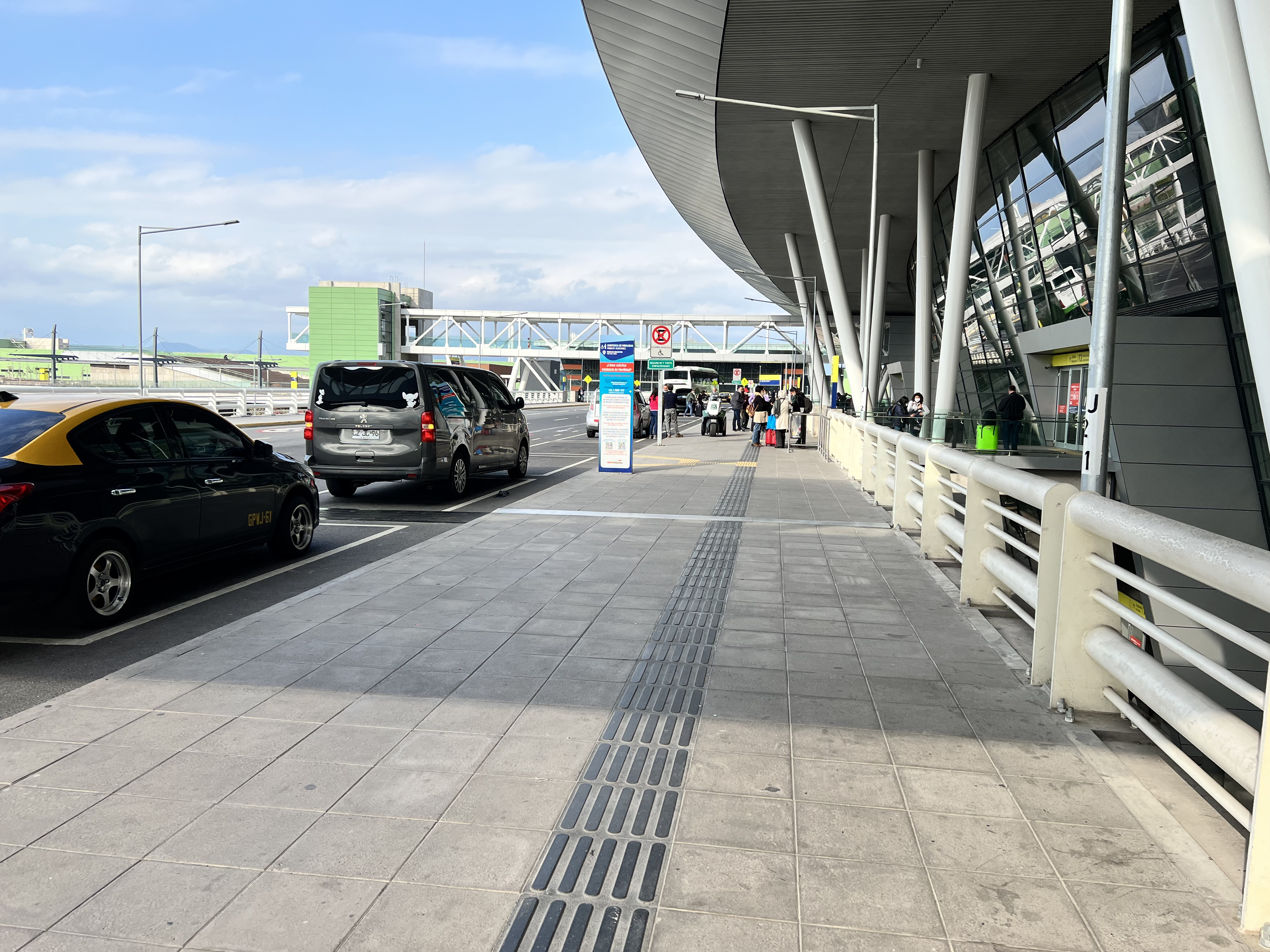
Departures area at International Terminal

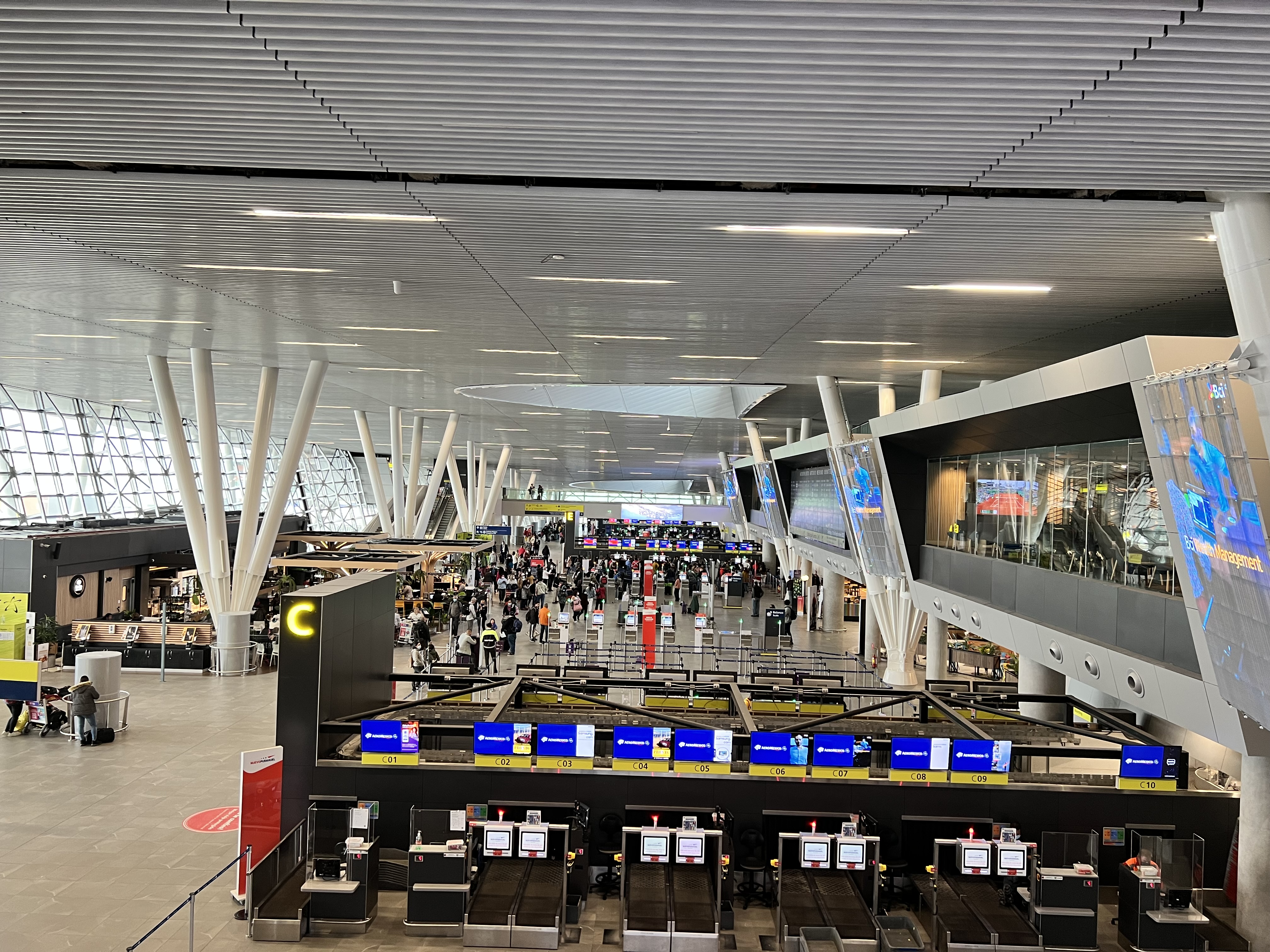
Check-in counters at International Terminal

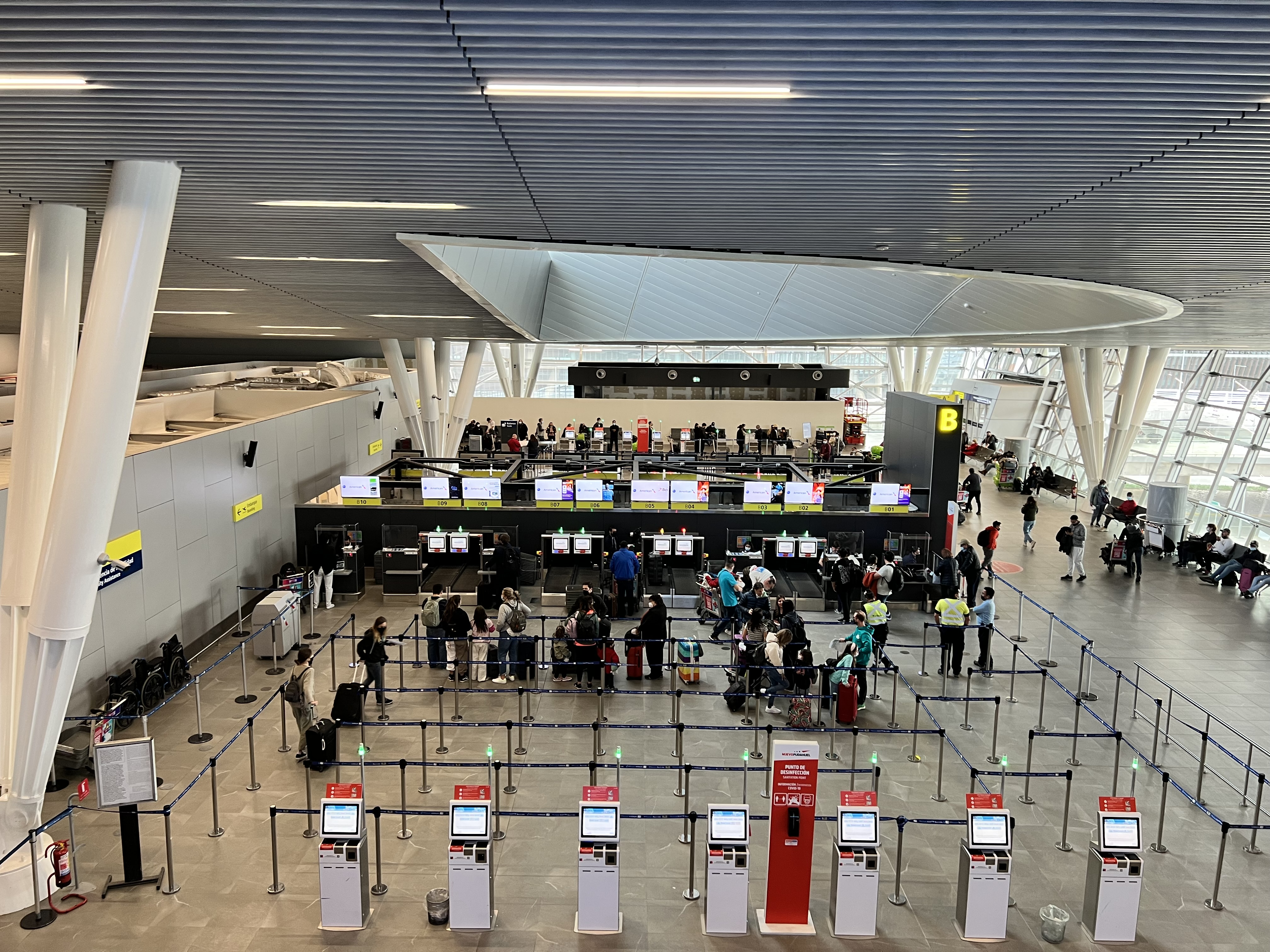
Check-in counters at International Terminal

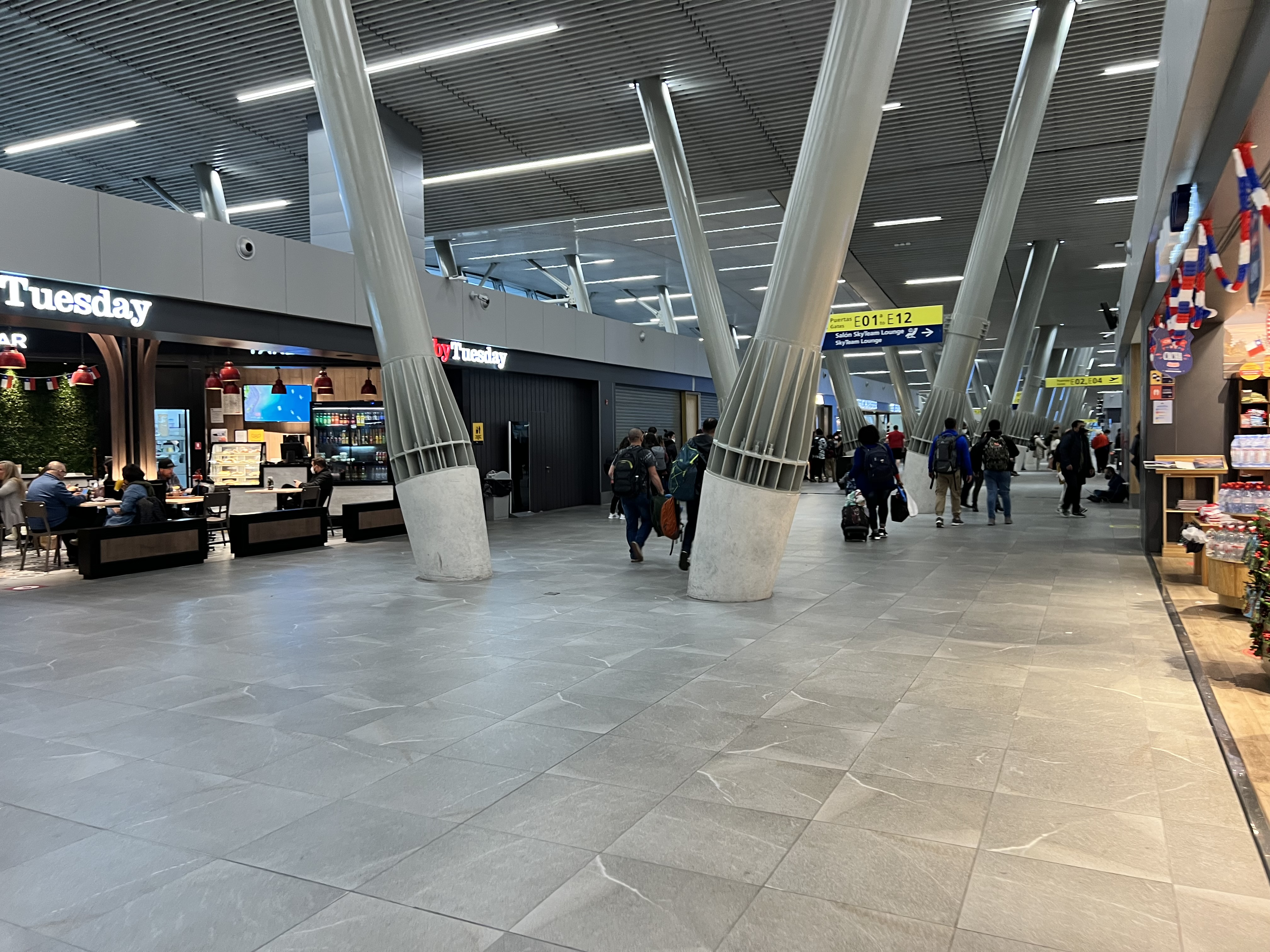
Main corridor at International Terminal

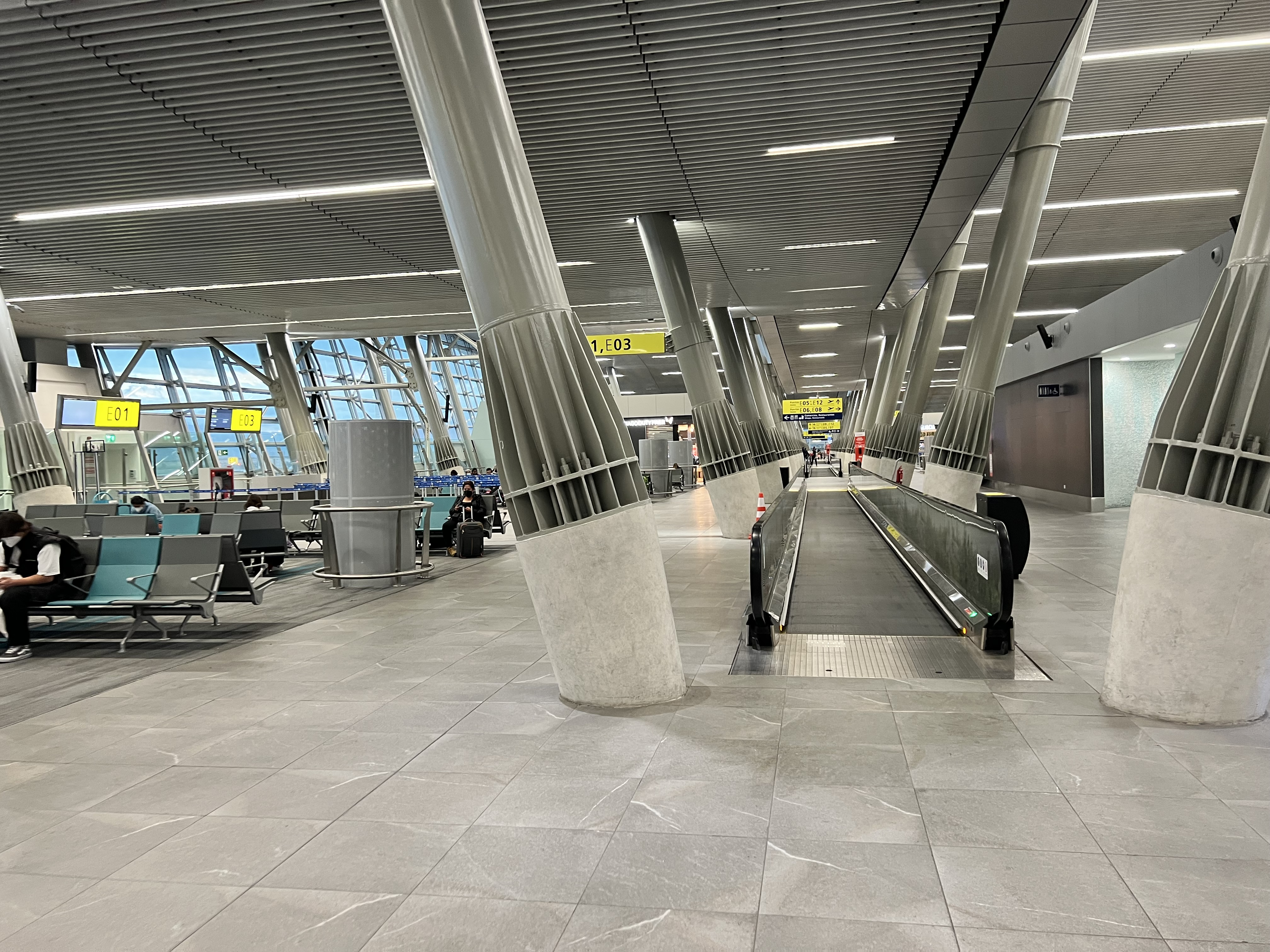
Last waiting gates at International Terminal

=== Cargo ===
Airlines	Destinations
Atlas Air	Campinas, Miami
Avianca Cargo	Bogotá, Ciudad del Este
Cargolux	Aguadilla, Amsterdam, Bogotá, Luxembourg
China Cargo Airlines	Los Angeles
DHL Aero Expreso	Miami, Panama City–Tocumen
Ethiopian Airlines Cargo	Addis Ababa, Campinas, Lagos
FedEx Express	Buenos Aires–Ezeiza, Memphis
Korean Air Cargo	Campinas, Seoul–Incheon
LATAM Cargo Chile	Amsterdam, Brussels, Buenos Aires–Ezeiza, Campinas, Miami, Quito
Lufthansa Cargo	Frankfurt
UPS Airlines	Buenos Aires–Ezeiza, Campinas
Western Global Airlines	Miami

== Statistics ==
Busiest international routes January–December (2023)
Rank	City	Passengers	% change	Airlines
1	Buenos Aires, Argentina (Ezeiza and Aeroparque)	1.517.686	▲54,8%	Aerolíneas Argentinas, JetSmart Argentina, JetSmart Chile, KLM, LATAM Chile, Sky Airline
2	Lima, Peru	1.408.452	▲31,7%	JetSmart Chile, JetSmart Perú, LATAM Chile, LATAM Perú, Sky Airline
3	São Paulo–Guarulhos, Brazil	1.107.154	▲84,4%	JetSmart Chile, LATAM Brasil, LATAM Chile, Sky Airline
4	Bogotá, Colombia	703.480	▲11,4%	Avianca, JetSmart Chile, LATAM, Sky Airline
5	Rio de Janeiro–Galeão, Brazil	559.820	▲108,5%	JetSmart Chile, LATAM Chile, Sky Airline
6	Panama City, Panama	547.738	▲5,3%	Copa Airlines
7	Madrid, Spain	471.950	▲16,5%	Iberia, LATAM Chile
8	Miami, FL, US	457.912	▲6,0%	American Airlines, LATAM Chile
9	Mendoza, Argentina	226.650	▲58,8%	Aerolíneas Argentinas, LATAM Chile, Sky Airline
10	Paris–Charles de Gaulle, France	222.509	▲40,9%	Air France

Busiest domestic routes January–December (2023)
Rank	City	Passengers	% change	Airlines
1	Antofagasta	1.813.636	▲15,1%	JetSmart Chile, LATAM Chile, Sky Airline
2	Calama	1.806.046	▲24,3%	JetSmart Chile, LATAM Chile, Sky Airline
3	Iquique	1.501.439	▲8,6%	JetSmart Chile, LATAM Chile, Sky Airline
4	Concepción	1.399.552	▲23,6%	JetSmart Chile, LATAM Chile, Sky Airline
5	Puerto Montt	1.367.438	▲11,9%	JetSmart Chile, LATAM Chile, Sky Airline
6	Temuco	1.016.763	▲16,3%	JetSmart Chile, LATAM Chile, Sky Airline
7	La Serena	839.370	▲11,1%	JetSmart Chile, LATAM Chile, Sky Airline
8	Copiapo	685.617	▲7,9%	LATAM Chile, Sky Airline
9	Punta Arenas	659.963	▲0,9%	JetSmart Chile, LATAM Chile, Sky Airline
10	Arica	637.369	▲6,7%	JetSmart Chile, LATAM Chile, Sky Airline
11	Valdivia	416.436	▲8,5%	JetSmart Chile, LATAM Chile, Sky Airline
12	Balmaceda	328.291	▼ -6,1%	JetSmart.Chile, LATAM Chile, Sky Airline
13	Osorno	303.209	▲26,7%	LATAM Chile, Sky Airline
14	Castro	151.277	▲8,2%	JetSmart Chile, LATAM Chile, Sky Airline
15	Easter Island	151.277	▲322,4%	LATAM Chile
16	Puerto Natales	134.185	▲47,7%	JetSmart Chile, LATAM Chile, Sky Airline

== Ground transportation ==
=== Roads ===
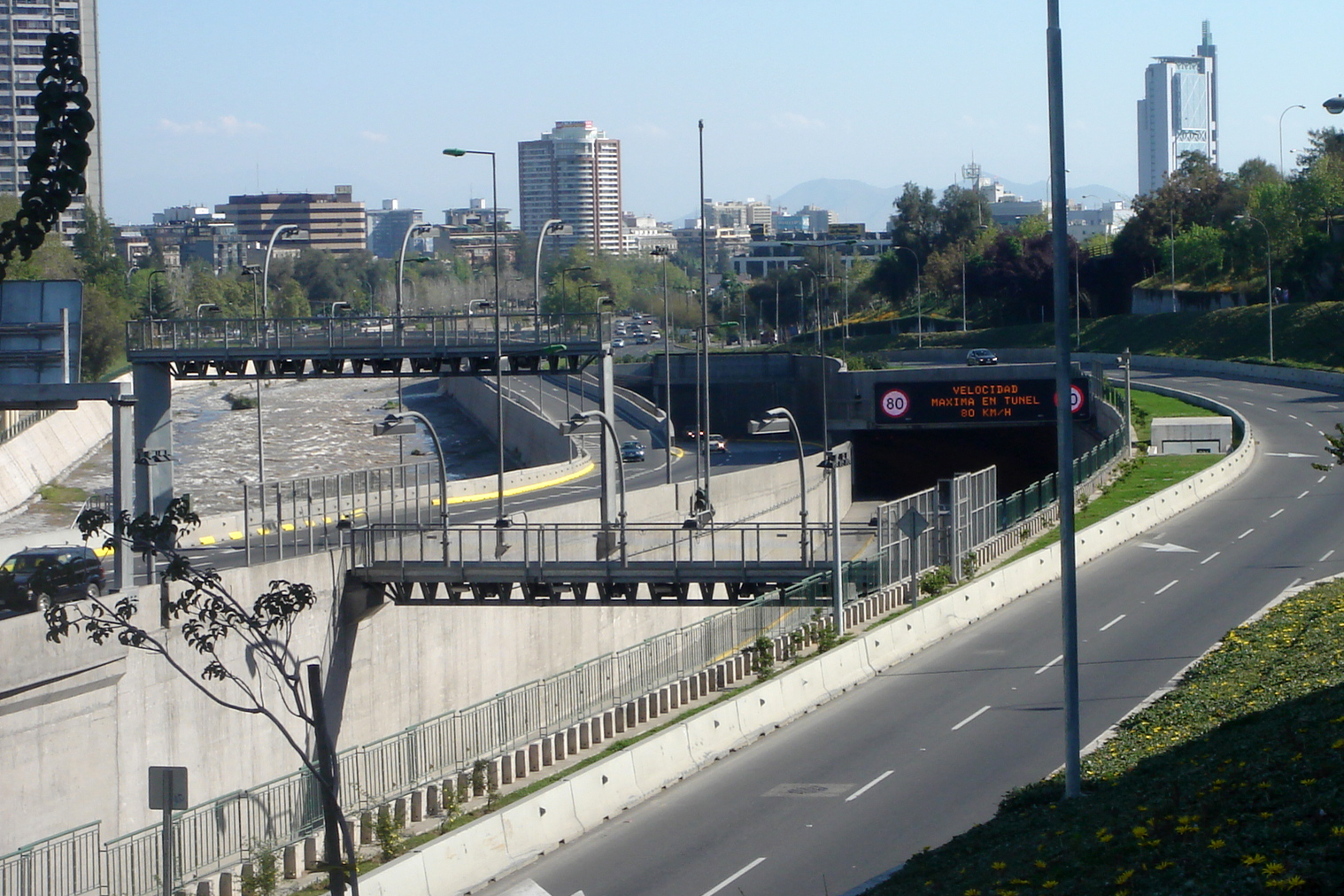
Costanera Norte Expressway

Arturo Merino Benitez is about 17 kilometres (11 mi) by car from Santiago's city center. The airport is well served by the six-lane expressway Costanera Norte (Exit # 31), which crosses through the city from West to East bordering the Mapocho river, while it is also well connected to the West, North and North-East of Santiago by the Vespucio Norte Express Ring motorway (Exit # 18).

=== Taxi and shuttle services ===
There are two official airport taxi services: Taxi Oficial and Taxi Vip. TransVip shuttle services reach most of Santiago's hotels, business and residential districts.

=== Bus ===
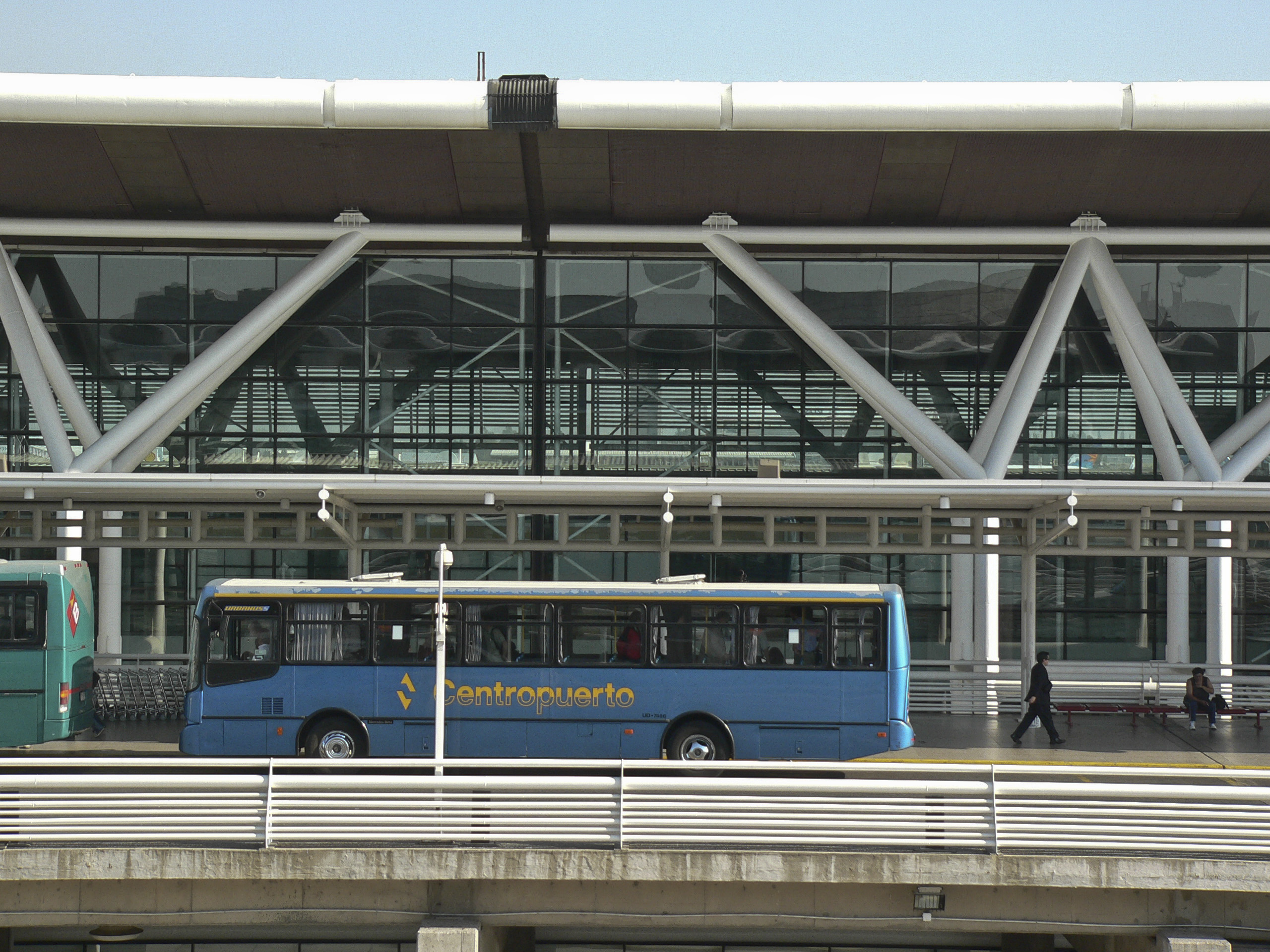
Buses at the departures level

Centropuerto buses connect the airport with the Los Héroes station of the Santiago Metro network, with an average arrival frequency of every 10 minutes on weekdays, and every 15 minutes on weekends. Turbus offers a similar service to its Alameda terminal. Both services stop at the Pajaritos metro station/bus terminal on the way.

Two public bus lines connect the airport to Santiago: Linea 555 connects to Pajaritos metro station (in the northern part of the city) and Linea 444 connects to the southern areas. Both lines connect with Metro Santiago via different stations.

== Accidents and incidents ==
- On 28 April 1969, LAN Chile Flight 160, a Boeing 727 arriving from Buenos Aires's Ministro Pistarini International Airport, crash-landed 24 km (14 mi) north of Colina, Chile, roughly 50 km (31 mi) north of Arturo Merino Benítez Airport. None of the 60 passengers or crew were injured in the accident, though the aircraft was written off.

== See also ==
- Transport in Chile
- List of airports in Chile
