= Desierto de Atacama Airport =

Airport in Chile

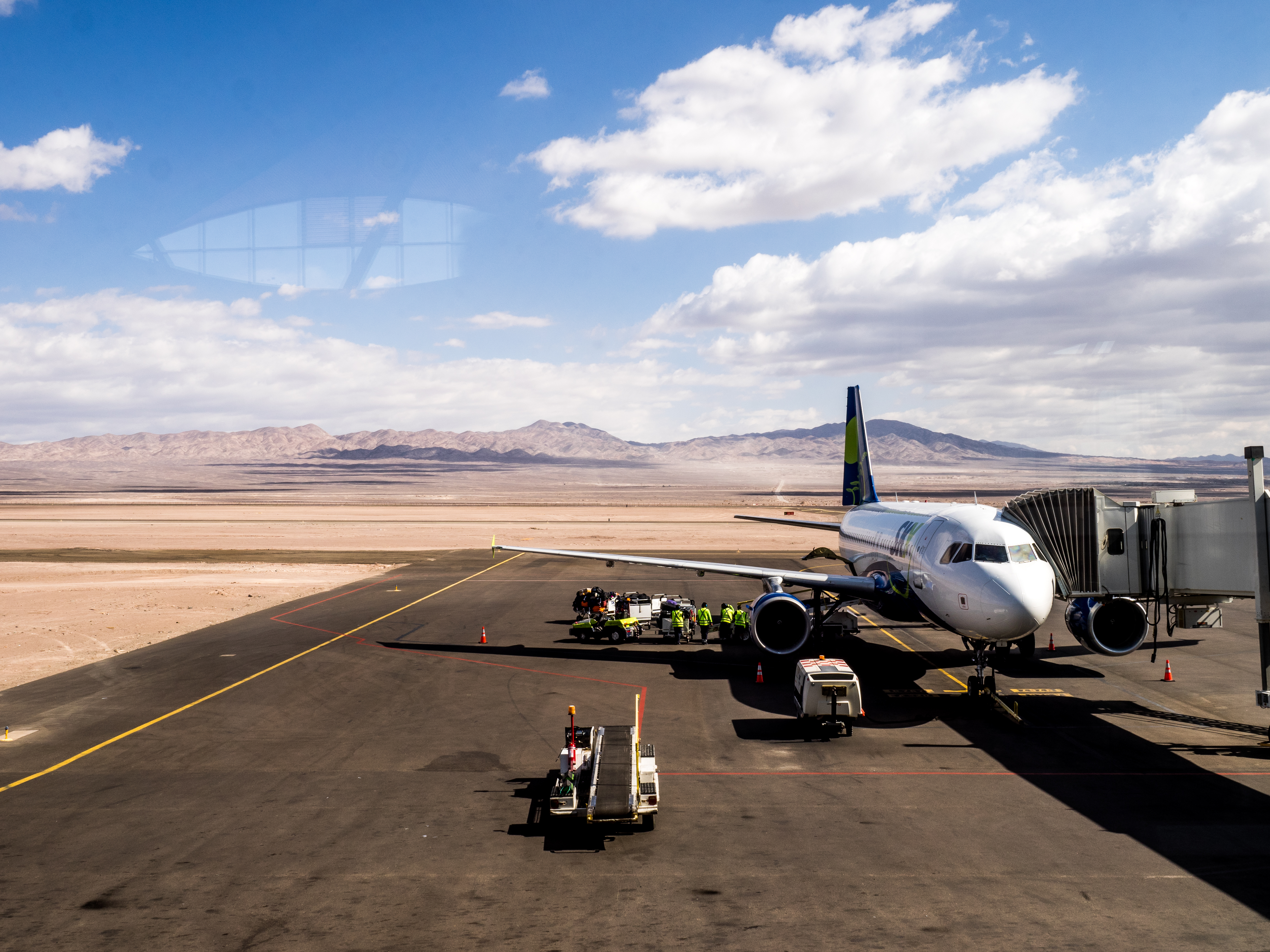
- Sky Airlines at the Atacama Airport
- IATA: CPO; ICAO: SCAT

Summary
- Airport type: Public
- Serves: Copiapó, Chile
- Elevation AMSL: 670 ft / 204 m
- Coordinates: 27°15′40″S 70°46′45″W

Map
- Location of airport in Chile

Runways
Direction	Length		Surface
Direction	m	ft	Surface
17/35	2,200	7,218	Asphalt
- Sources: GCM Google Maps

Desierto de Atacama Airport (IATA: CPO, ICAO: SCAT) is an airport serving the region around Copiapó, the capital of the Atacama Region of Chile. The airport is in the desert north of the Copiapó River, 16 kilometres (9.9 mi) inland from the Pacific coast.

Opened in February 2005, the airport replaced the smaller Chamonate Airport near the city, which was unable to increase its capacity and could not handle larger narrow-body planes such as the Airbus A320 and Boeing 737-800.

== Airlines and destinations ==
Airlines	Destinations
JetSmart Chile	Santiago de Chile
LATAM Chile	Santiago de Chile
Sky Airline	Santiago de Chile

== See also ==
- Transport in Chile
- List of airports in Chile
