= Chacalluta International Airport =

Airport in Chile

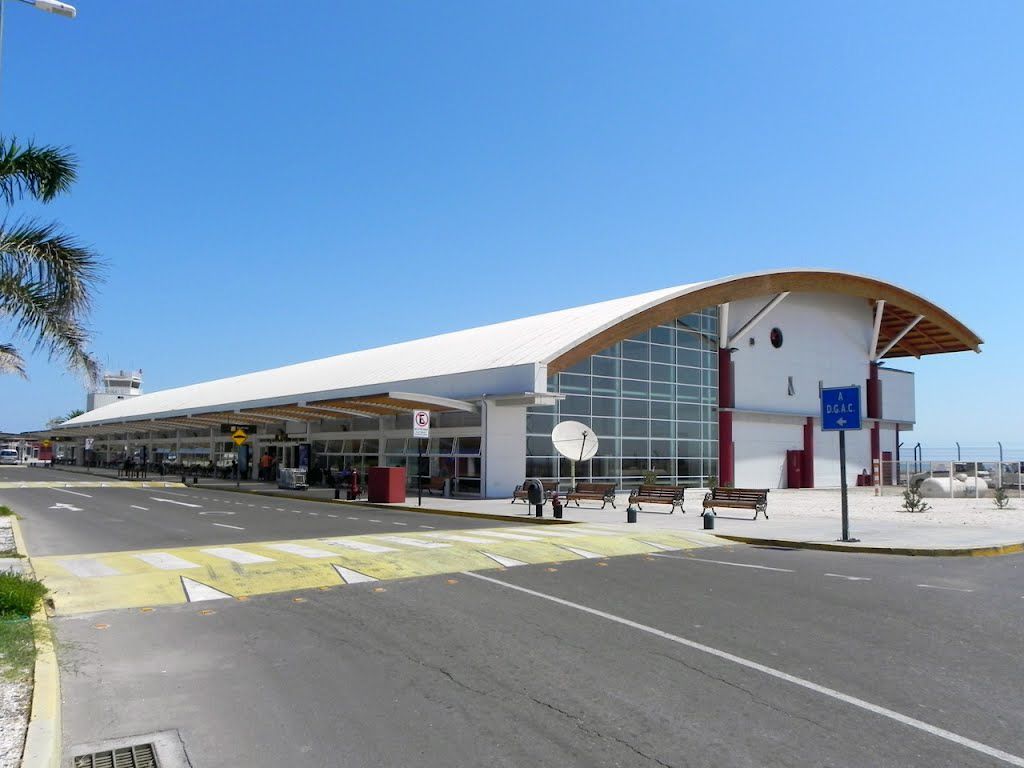
- IATA: ARI; ICAO: SCAR

Summary
- Airport type: Public
- Serves: Arica, Arica y Parinacota Region, Chile
- Elevation AMSL: 166 ft (51 m)
- Coordinates: 18°20′55″S 70°20′20″W

Map
- Location of the airport in Chile

Runways
| Direction | Length | | Surface |
| Direction | m | ft | Surface |
|---|---|---|---|
| 02/20 | 2,170 | 7,119 | Asphalt |
- Sources: Landings.com GCM

Chacalluta International Airport (Aeródromo de Chacalluta Arica) (IATA: ARI, ICAO: SCAR) is an airport serving the city of Arica, capital of the Arica Province in the northern Arica y Parinacota Region of Chile. It is 18.5 kilometres (11.5 mi) northwest of the city and 1 kilometre (0.62 mi) south of the border with Peru, adjacent to the village of Villa Frontera.

== Airlines and destinations ==
| Airlines | Destinations |
|---|---|
| Boliviana de Aviación | La Paz |
| JetSmart Chile | Concepcion, Iquique, La Serena, Santiago de Chile |
| LATAM Chile | Santiago de Chile |
| Sky Airline | Santiago de Chile |

== See also ==
- Transport in Chile
- List of airports in Chile
