= Balmaceda Airport =

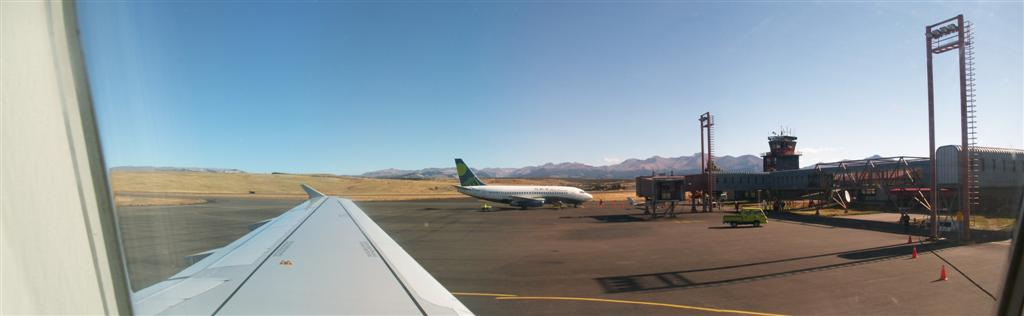
- IATA: BBA; ICAO: SCBA

Summary
- Airport type: Public
- Location: Balmaceda, Chile
- Elevation AMSL: 1,719 ft / 524 m
- Coordinates: 45°54′58″S 71°41′15″W

Map
- Location of Balmaceda Airport in Chile

Runways
Direction	Length		Surface
Direction	m	ft	Surface
09/27	2,503	8,212	Asphalt
- Sources: Landings.com, GCM

Balmaceda Airport (IATA: BBA, ICAO: SCBA) is an airport next to the village of Balmaceda, serving the Aysén Region of Chile. The airport is 4 kilometres (2.5 mi) west of the Argentina border, 55 km south-east of Coyhaique, the regional capital.

== Expansion plans ==
In 2016, works to improve the airfield and expand capacity were commenced, consisting of resurfacing the damaged runway surface, the building of a new 30 m wide parallel taxiway and a new control tower, expansion of the apron, and improvements to other administrative structures. These were made with an investment of approximately 27 billion pesos, much of which were national funds intended for the development of remote regions of the country.

In April 2018 the new taxiway entered use as a temporary runway (designated 09L/27R) to enable repair works on the main runway.

== Airlines and destinations ==
Airlines	Destinations
JetSmart Chile	Seasonal: Concepcion, Santiago de Chile, Temuco
LATAM Chile	Puerto Montt, Santiago de Chile
Sky Airline	Puerto Montt, Santiago de Chile
Aerovías DAP	Seasonal: Punta Arenas

== Accidents and incidents ==
On 8 April 1968, Douglas C-49K CC-CBM of LADECO crashed on approach, killing all 36 people on board. The aircraft was operating a domestic scheduled passenger flight from Los Cerrillos Airport, Santiago.

== See also ==
- Transport in Chile
- List of airports in Chile
