= El Tepual International Airport =

International Airport of Puerto Montt, Chile

El Tepual International Airport Aeropuerto Internacional El Tepual
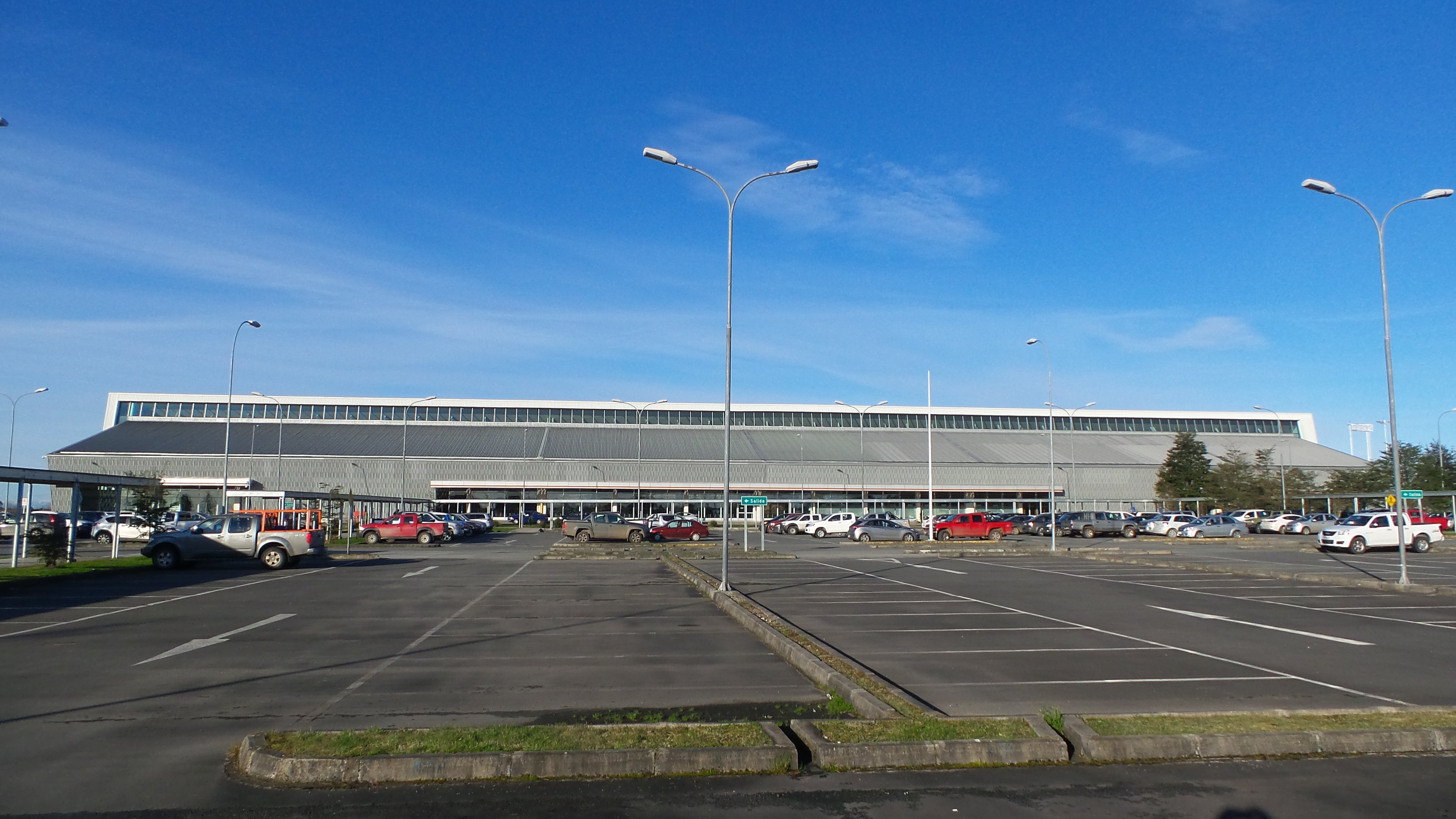
- IATA: PMC; ICAO: SCTE; WMO: 85799

Summary
- Airport type: Military/public
- Operator: IDC
- Location: Puerto Montt
- Elevation AMSL: 294 ft / 90 m
- Coordinates: 41°26′19″S 73°05′38″W
- Website: https://www.aeropuertodepuertomontt.cl/

Map
- Location of airport in Chile

Runways
Direction	Length		Surface
Direction	ft	m	Surface
18/36	8,694	2,650	Concrete

Statistics (2012)
- Passengers: 1,117,311

El Tepual International Airport (IATA: PMC, ICAO: SCTE) is a commercial and private aviation facility which serves the tourist area of Puerto Montt, Chile. It is one of the most important airports in Chile and is considered a gateway to the Chilean Patagonia.

== History ==
It is located at the center of Northern Patagonia and near the archaeological site of Monte Verde. The construction of the runway at El Tepual Airport was completed in April 1960, and became the site of a great airlift after a magnitude 9.5 earthquake hit the area on 22 May 1960. The airport with its original terminal was officially inaugurated in 1963. After Augusto Pinochet left Chile's Presidency, a plan was put underway by the new government to make new airport terminals and freeways across the country, so that Chile's smaller cities could have better connections with Santiago. Puerto Montt, along with Calama and other small areas, were among the most benefitted places out of the number of Chilean cities listed on the project.

During the early 1990s, the numbers of international tourists (specially those from neighboring countries such as Argentina and Brazil) grew considerably. In 1995, the new airport terminal finally opened, with Lan Chile as the largest airline company flying there.

LATAM Chile has been flying for many decades to Puerto Montt. Other carriers that fly to Puerto Montt are SKY Airline and JetSMART.

El Tepual is owned by a number of international companies, headed by Chile's IDC, or Administracion de Concesiones. In 1998, IDC agreed to operate the airport for twelve more years, which would make El Tepual their property until 2010.

A new terminal was inaugurated in February 2010, having increased the number of jetways from 2 to 5, as well as improving the check-in area, baggage claim, airport security, heating system and other airport facilities as well as significantly enlarging the parking lot. By the mid 2020s, a new, parallel runway should be operative.

== Facilities ==
The airport has five jetways (also called airplane tunnel), 4 domestic gates (numbered 1–4) and one international gate (gate number 5, still not in operation and still used for domestic).

The airport has a restaurant, a massage facility, immigration offices and areas for disabled persons, among other facilities.

== Capability ==
El Tepual airport can only cater to airplanes with the size of a Boeing 707 or smaller. Boeing 737s, Airbus A318s, Airbus A319s, Airbus A320s and Airbus A321s are particularly prominent among airplanes that fly to the airport.

In 2004, the IDC estimated that one million passengers passed through the airport's gates, making it Chile's second busiest. At the time, IDC expected that total to rise to four million passengers by 2010. Among the airport's cargo operations, the largest aircraft the airport has seen is the Boeing 777F.

== Airlines and destinations ==
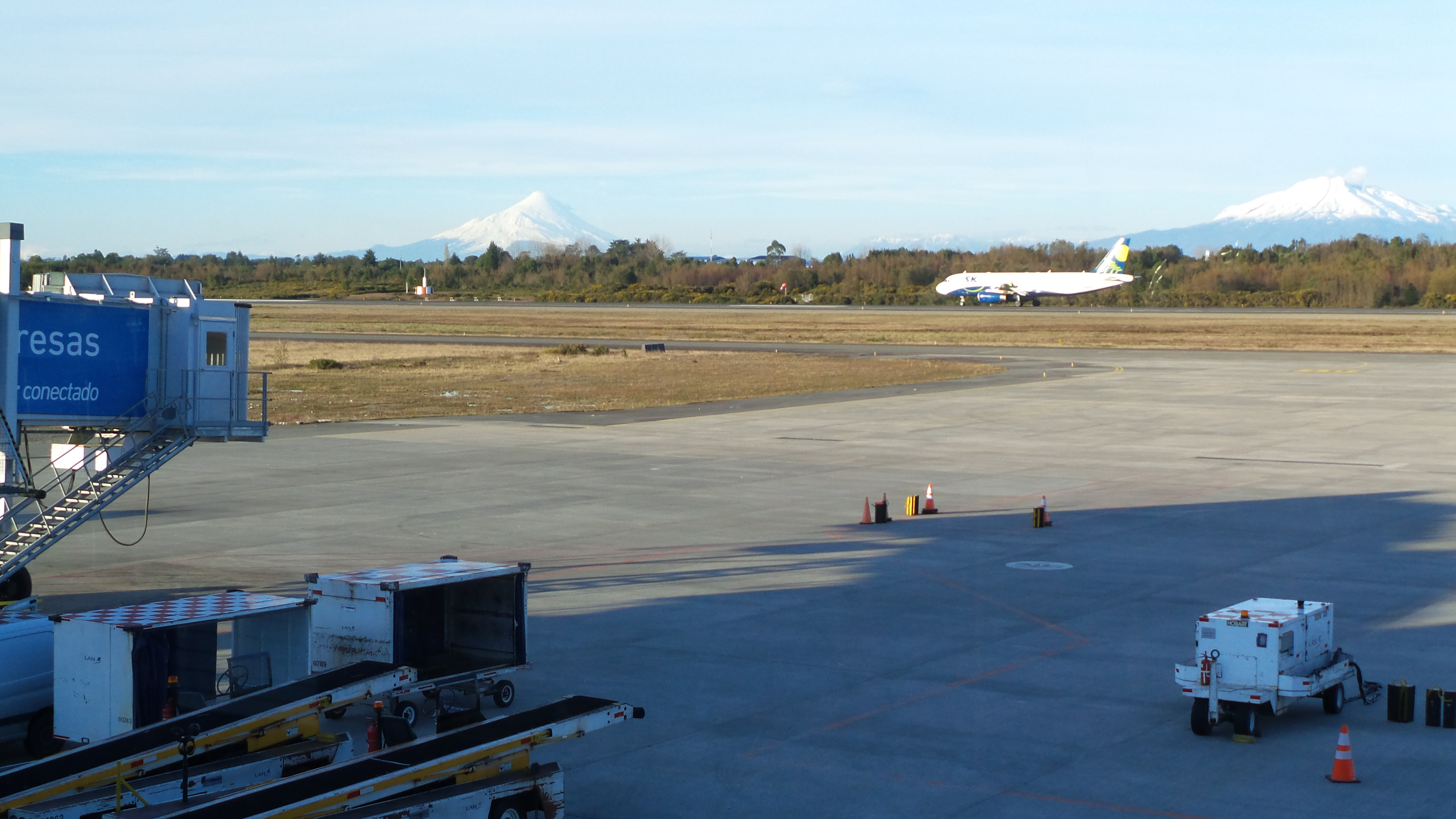
El Tepual International Airport with Calbuco and Osorno volcanoes in the background. A Sky Airline Airbus A-320 jet is also visible.

Airlines	Destinations
JetSmart Chile	Concepción, Punta Arenas, Santiago de Chile
LATAM Chile	Balmaceda, Concepción, Puerto Natales, Punta Arenas, Santiago de Chile
Sky Airline	Balmaceda, Punta Arenas, San Carlos de Bariloche, Santiago de Chile; Seasonal: Puerto Natales

== Charter operations ==
A large number of different airlines operate off-regular schedule service into El Tepual. These are usually hired by tour agents or companies. These include such airlines as ATS Aerotaxis del Sur, Archipiélagos Aviación, AeroCord, Raúl Atala EIRL, Transportes Aéreos San Rafael and Pewén among others.

== Accidents and incidents ==
- On 5 December 1969, Douglas C-47A CC-CBY of LAN Chile crashed on take-off. The aircraft was operating a cargo flight. All three people on board survived.
