= Carriel Sur International Airport =

International airport in Chile

Carriel Sur International Airport Aeropuerto Carriel Sur
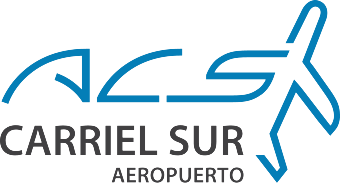
- IATA: CCP; ICAO: SCIE; WMO: 85682

Summary
- Airport type: Public
- Operator: Sociedad Concesionaria Aeropuerto Carriel Sur S.A.
- Serves: Concepción, Chile
- Location: Talcahuano
- Elevation AMSL: 26 ft (7.9 m)
- Coordinates: 36°46′21″S 73°03′47″W
- Website: aeropuertocarrielsur.cl

Map
- Location of Carriel Sur International Airport in Chile

Runways
Direction	Length		Surface
Direction	m	ft	Surface
02/20	2,600	8,530	Asphalt

Statistics (2023)
- Passengers: 2.099.240▲26,06%
- Sources: SkyVector GCM Landings.com

Carriel Sur International Airport (IATA: CCP, ICAO: SCIE) is located in Talcahuano, Greater Concepción in the Bío Bío Region, 8 km (5 mi) from Concepción downtown. It is one of the largest airports in Chile and serves domestic traffic for LATAM Airlines, JetSmart and Sky Airline. It also serves as a primary alternate airport for Arturo Merino Benitez Airport, usually receiving international traffic from Santiago when that airport closes due to weather.

== History ==
Although plans to build an airport near Concepción date back to 1954, construction began only in 1960, shortly after the 22 May earthquake, as it became imperative to build a modern airport to link Chile's south-central region with the rest of the country. The airport was opened to the public on 3 January 1968.

No airline accidents have been recorded at the airport, although bird ingestions during takeoff have occurred, causing rejected takeoffs or emergency returns from departing aircraft. No casualties from these ingestions have been recorded.

In 2000, the original terminal building was decommissioned and turned over to the aviation authority for administrative use. A new terminal, operated by AEROSUR S.A., was opened north of the latter allowing the installation of four jetways, Customs and Immigration service, a VIP lounge, and a duty-free store. The old ramp was retained, increasing the number of parking spaces from five to ten (the original five plus four jetways and one remote parking adjacent to jetway #4)

In 2025, the airport plans to restart international flights.

== Airlines and destinations ==
Airlines	Destinations
JetSmart Chile	Antofagasta, Arica, Balmaceda, Calama, Iquique, La Serena, Puerto Montt, Punta Arenas, Santiago de Chile
LATAM Chile	Antofagasta, Puerto Montt, Punta Arenas, Santiago de Chile; Seasonal: Calama
Sky Airline	Iquique, Santiago de Chile

== Access ==
The airport is located 6 km (4 mi) from Concepción downtown and 12 km (7 mi) from Talcahuano downtown.

=== Car ===
The airport is well served by the Interportuaria Talcahuano – Penco expressway (Airport Exit).

=== Bus ===
Bus transportation is available through Biobus, a public transport bus line, operated by FESUR, connecting Biotren Concepción Station to the airport.

== Air traffic control ==
Carriel Sur does not have radar service for approach and departure control. This service is provided using non-radar protocols, in coordination with Santiago's Area Control Center. Carriel Sur's control tower provides ground, tower, and approach services on a 24-hour basis and is staffed by three air traffic controllers at all times.

== See also ==
- Transport in Chile
- List of airports in Chile
