= Andrés Sabella Gálvez International Airport =

Andrés Sabella Gálvez International Airport former Cerro Moreno Intl Airport
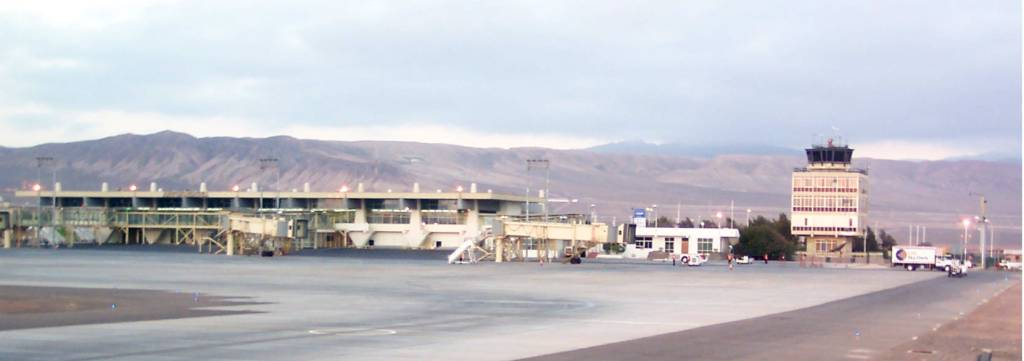
- IATA: ANF; ICAO: SCFA; WMO: 85442

Summary
- Airport type: Public
- Operator: Sociedad Concesionaria Aeropuerto de Antofagasta S.A.
- Serves: Antofagasta, Chile
- Elevation AMSL: 455 ft (139 m)
- Coordinates: 23°26′40″S 70°26′42″W
- Website: https://www.aeropuertoantofagasta.cl/

Map
- Location of airport in Chile

Runways
Direction	Length		Surface
Direction	m	ft	Surface
01/19	2,600	8,530	Asphalt
- Sources: GCM

Andrés Sabella Gálvez International Airport (IATA: ANF, ICAO: SCFA) is an airport serving Antofagasta, capital of the Antofagasta Region of Chile. It is 10 kilometres (6.2 mi) north of Antofagasta and 3 kilometres (1.9 mi) inland from the Pacific coastline.

== Airlines and destinations ==
Airlines	Destinations
JetSmart Chile	Cali, Concepción, La Serena, Santiago de Chile
LATAM Chile	Concepción, La Serena, Lima (ends 1 April 2027), Santiago de Chile
Sky Airline	La Serena, Santiago de Chile

== See also ==
- Transport in Chile
- List of airports in Chile
