= La Florida Airport (Chile) =

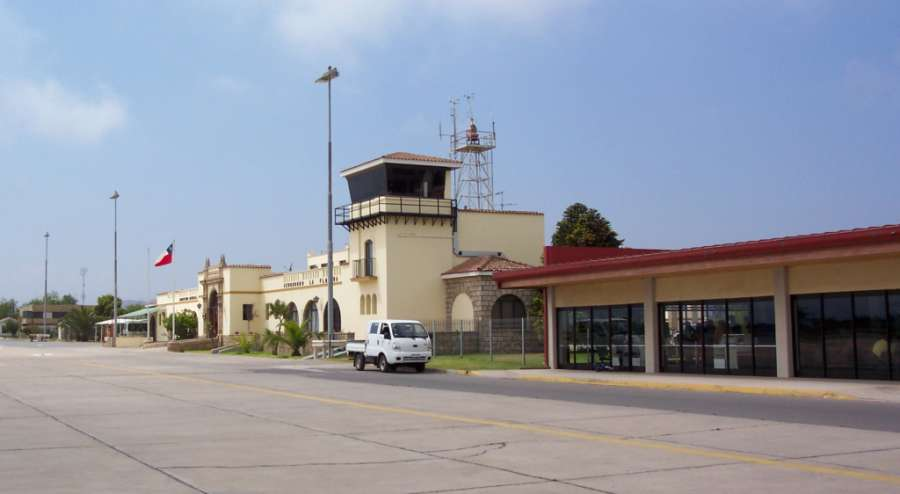
- IATA: LSC; ICAO: SCSE

Summary
- Airport type: Public
- Operator: Government
- Location: La Serena, Coquimbo, Chile
- Elevation AMSL: 481 ft / 147 m
- Coordinates: 29°54′58″S 71°11′58″W

Map
- Location of airport in Chile

Runways
Direction	Length		Surface
Direction	m	ft	Surface
12/30	1,938	6,358	Asphalt
12R/30L	1,360	4,462	Grass
- Source: SkyVector GCM

La Florida Airport (IATA: LSC, ICAO: SCSE) is an airport serving La Serena, a Pacific coastal city in the Coquimbo Region of Chile.

== Airlines and destinations ==
Airlines	Destinations
JetSmart Chile	Antofagasta, Arica, Calama, Iquique, Santiago de Chile
LATAM Chile	Antofagasta, Calama, Santiago de Chile
Sky Airline	Antofagasta, Calama, Iquique, Santiago de Chile

== History ==
On January 19, 1951, Captain Roberto Parragué Singer on his plane "Manu-Tara" took off from La Florida Airport and landed on Hanga Roa, Easter Island the next day, achieving the first flight ever to Easter Island.

== Accidents and incidents ==
- On December 9, 1982, Aeronor Flight 304 crashed short of the runway, killing all 46 passengers and crew.

== See also ==
- Transport in Chile
- List of airports in Chile
