= Cañal Bajo Carlos Hott Siebert Airport =

Airport in Osorno, Chile

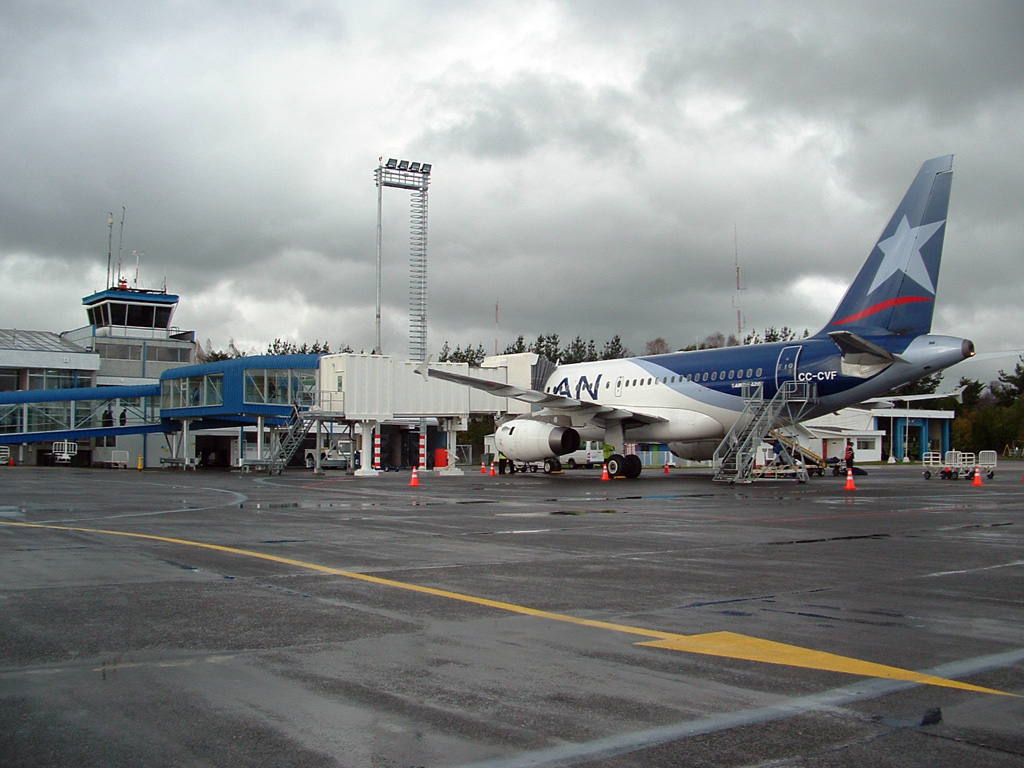
- IATA: ZOS; ICAO: SCJO

Summary
- Airport type: Public
- Serves: Osorno, Chile
- Elevation AMSL: 187 ft / 57 m
- Coordinates: 40°36′40″S 73°03′38″W

Map
- Location of airport in Chile

Runways
Direction	Length		Surface
Direction	m	ft	Surface
15/33	1,950	6,398	Asphalt
- Sources: AIP Chile,

Cañal Bajo Carlos Hott Siebert Airport (Spanish: Aeródromo Cañal Bajo Carlos Hott Siebert, IATA: ZOS, ICAO: SCJO) is an airport serving Osorno, a city in the Los Lagos Region of Chile. The airport is 5 kilometres (3 mi) southeast of the city.

== Airlines and destinations ==
Airlines	Destinations
LATAM Chile	Santiago de Chile
Sky Airline	Santiago de Chile

== See also ==
- Transport in Chile
- List of airports in Chile
