= Mocopulli Airport =

Mocopulli Airport Aeródromo Mocopulli
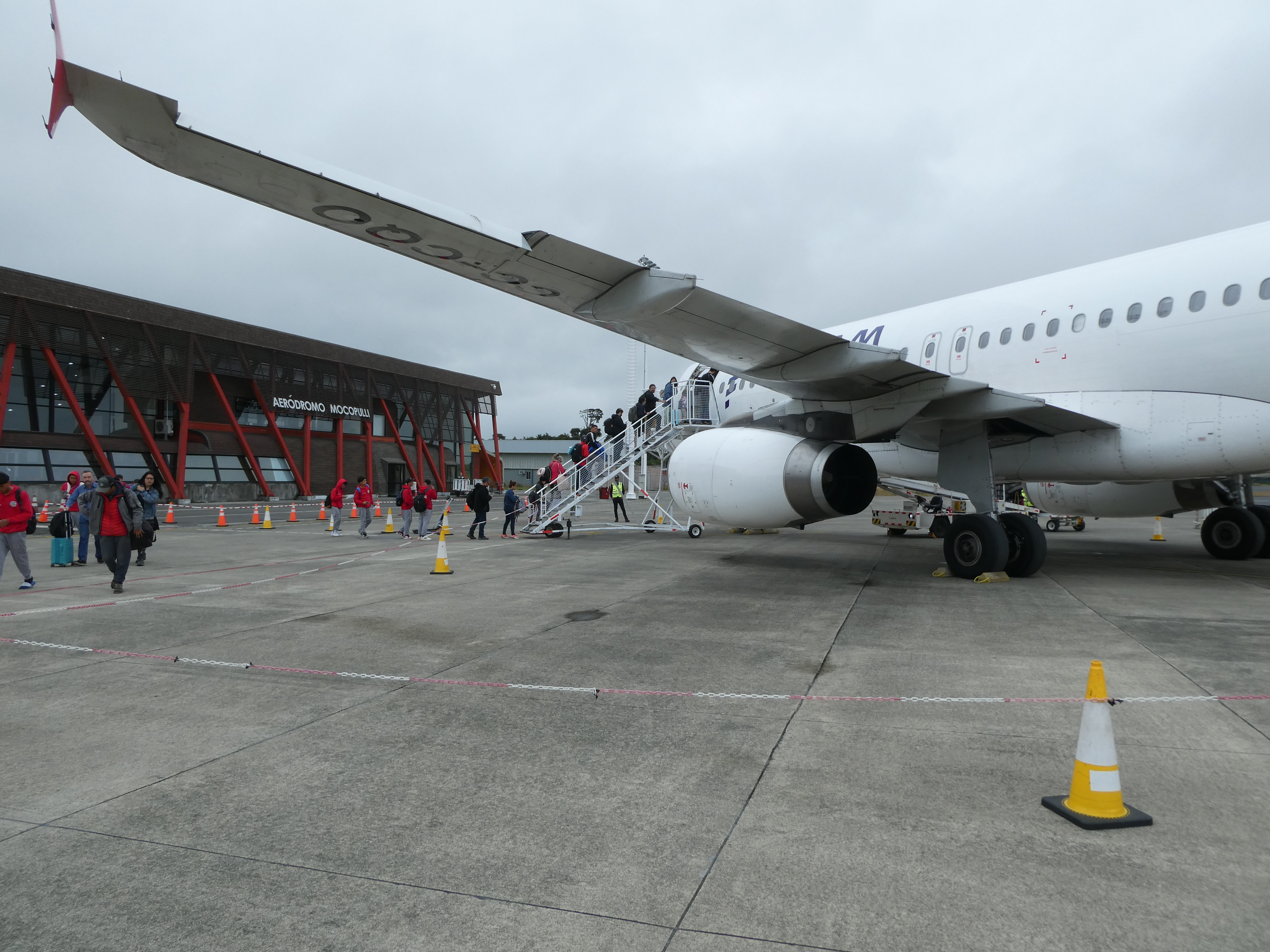
- IATA: MHC; ICAO: SCPQ

Summary
- Airport type: Public
- Serves: Dalcahue, Chile, Castro, Chile
- Elevation AMSL: 528 ft / 161 m
- Coordinates: 42°20′25″S 73°42′56″W

Map
- Location of airport in Chile

Runways
Direction	Length		Surface
Direction	m	ft	Surface
17/35	2,004	6,575	Asphalt
- Source: Landings.com, Google Maps, GCM

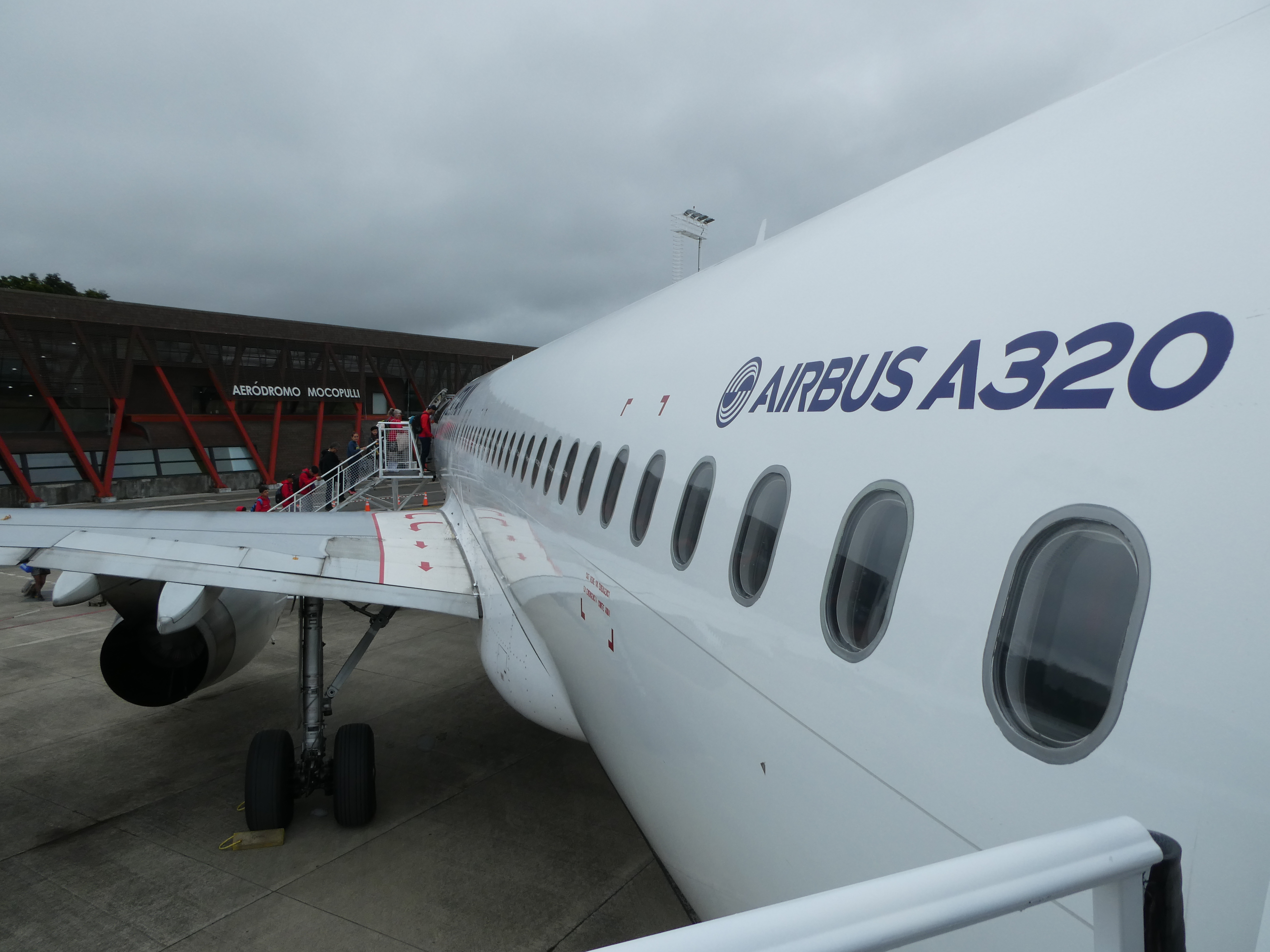
An Airbus A320 of LATAM Chile at Mocopulli Airport

Mocopulli Airport (Aerodromo Mocopulli) (IATA: MHC, ICAO: SCPQ) is an airport serving Dalcahue, a port city on Chiloé Island in the Los Lagos Region of Chile, as well as the city of Castro. The airport is 6 kilometres (3.7 mi) northwest of Dalcahue.

The Mocopulli VOR-DME (Ident: MPI) is located on the field.

== Airline and destinations ==
Airlines	Destinations
LATAM Chile	Santiago de Chile
Sky Airline	Santiago de Chile

== See also ==
- Transport in Chile
- List of airports in Chile
