= Teniente Julio Gallardo Airport =

Airport in Chile

Teniente Julio Gallardo Airfield
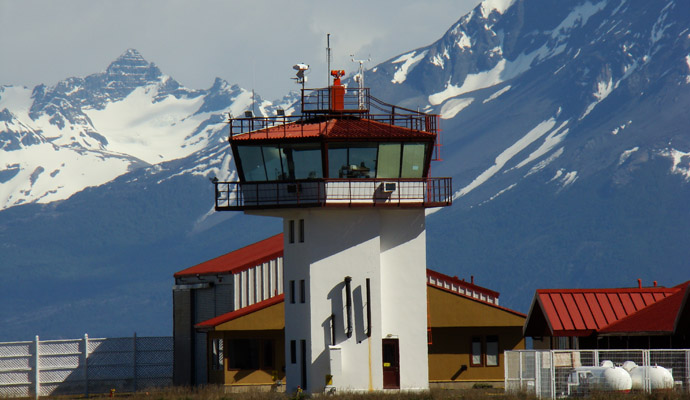
- IATA: PNT; ICAO: SCNT

Summary
- Airport type: Public
- Serves: Puerto Natales, Chile
- Elevation AMSL: 218 ft / 66 m
- Coordinates: 51°40′12″S 72°31′50″W

Map
- Location of Teniente Julio Gallardo Airfield in Chile

Runways
Direction	Length		Surface
Direction	m	ft	Surface
10/28	1,764	5,787	Asphalt
- Source: Landings.com, Google Maps, GCM

Teniente Julio Gallardo Airport (Spanish: Aeródromo Teniente Julio Gallardo) (IATA: PNT, ICAO: SCNT) is an airport serving Puerto Natales, a city in the Magallanes Region of Chile. The airport is 7 kilometres (4.3 mi) north-northwest of Puerto Natales, which is on the Admiral Montt Gulf (es), a long fjord that reaches inland close to the border with Argentina. The airport is 12 kilometres (7.5 mi) from the border.

The Puerto Natales VOR-DME (Ident: PNT) is located 4.9 nautical miles (9.1 km) southeast of the airport.

== Expansion ==
In 2014, it was announced that the airport would be expanded, with the taxiway widened to 23 metres (75 ft), and the runway extended to 2,000 metres (6,600 ft) and widened to 45 metres (148 ft). Work was expected to be completed in September 2016, and was done so that the airport is better able to handle aircraft such as the A320 and Boeing 737 to return scheduled commercial service to Puerto Natales, which it has not had since 2013.

The latest available imagery (2/12/2015) shows a displaced threshold on the southeast end of the runway, limiting runway length to 1,315 metres (4,314 ft).

== Airlines and destinations ==
Airlines	Destinations
JetSmart Chile	Seasonal: Puerto Montt, Santiago de Chile
LATAM Chile	Seasonal: Puerto Montt, Santiago de Chile
Sky Airline	Seasonal: Puerto Montt, Santiago de Chile

== See also ==
- Transport in Chile
- List of airports in Chile
