= Balmaceda, Chile =

Balmaceda
- Location within Chile
- Coordinates: 45°54′33″S 71°42′02″W
- Country: Chile
- Region: Aysén
- Province: Coyhaique
- Municipalidad: Coyhaique
- Comuna: Coyhaique
- Balmaceda: January 1, 1917

Government
  - Type: Municipality
  - Mayor: Alejandro Huala Canumán (2012-2016)
- Elevation: 518 m (1,699 ft)

Population (2017 census)
  - Total: 405
- Time zone: UTC−04:00 (Chilean Standard (CLT))
  - Summer (DST): UTC−03:00 (Chilean Daylight (CLST))
- Area code: Country + town = 56 + 67
- Climate: Csb

Balmaceda is a Chilean village (Spanish: aldea) located south east of Coyhaique in Aysén Region. Balmaceda has around 500 inhabitants, and has Aysén Region's largest airport and meteorological station, Balmaceda Airport.

== History ==
The first settlers arrived into the zone in the early-20th century after being expelled from Argentina since the borders between Chile and Argentina were drawn in 1902. In 1917 Balmaceda was officially founded and was named after the Chilean president José Manuel Balmaceda. Balmaceda was recognized as a town by the government of Chile in 1928, initially being one of the largest inland Chilean settlements in what is now the Aysén Region. In 1945, The Chilean Air Force constructed an airfield, which is no longer in use. Beginning in November 2018, the airline JetSmart began operating routes between Balmaceda and Santiago, Punta Arenas, and Temuco.

== Transport ==
Balmaceda is linked to Route 40, in Argentina, via a 102 km gravel extension road.

== Climate ==
The climate of Balmaceda is an unusual combination of the dry-summer Mediterranean characteristic more typical of Central Chile with the subpolar oceanic characteristics more typical of southern Chile. It has the warm-summer Mediterranean climate, bordering the extremely rare cold-summer Mediterranean climate (Köppen Csb, borderline Csc), with short, though dry summers, and long, somewhat snowy though not severe winters. Precipitation, however, is markedly lower than on the coast of Chile owing to the rain shadow of the Andes, being about one-sixth to one-seventh what is received on the coast at the same latitude. Snow is very common during the winter but rarely stays on the ground.

Climate data for Balmaceda (1991–2020, extremes 1952–present)
Month	Jan	Feb	Mar	Apr	May	Jun	Jul	Aug	Sep	Oct	Nov	Dec	Year
Record high °C (°F)	33.2 (91.8)	35.3 (95.5)	32.0 (89.6)	24.4 (75.9)	18.3 (64.9)	17.2 (63.0)	14.5 (58.1)	15.1 (59.2)	22.7 (72.9)	27.8 (82.0)	30.0 (86.0)	32.0 (89.6)	35.3 (95.5)
Mean daily maximum °C (°F)	18.4 (65.1)	19.0 (66.2)	16.3 (61.3)	12.5 (54.5)	8.2 (46.8)	4.6 (40.3)	4.3 (39.7)	6.9 (44.4)	10.2 (50.4)	12.8 (55.0)	14.9 (58.8)	16.9 (62.4)	12.1 (53.8)
Daily mean °C (°F)	12.6 (54.7)	12.6 (54.7)	10.4 (50.7)	7.4 (45.3)	4.2 (39.6)	1.4 (34.5)	0.8 (33.4)	2.8 (37.0)	5.2 (41.4)	7.4 (45.3)	9.4 (48.9)	11.4 (52.5)	7.1 (44.8)
Mean daily minimum °C (°F)	6.9 (44.4)	6.1 (43.0)	4.5 (40.1)	2.2 (36.0)	0.3 (32.5)	−1.9 (28.6)	−2.7 (27.1)	−1.2 (29.8)	0.3 (32.5)	1.9 (35.4)	4.0 (39.2)	5.9 (42.6)	2.2 (36.0)
Record low °C (°F)	−5.9 (21.4)	−7.2 (19.0)	−10.3 (13.5)	−14.6 (5.7)	−17.3 (0.9)	−28.3 (−18.9)	−25.2 (−13.4)	−20.1 (−4.2)	−15.8 (3.6)	−11.6 (11.1)	−7.7 (18.1)	−6.0 (21.2)	−28.3 (−18.9)
Average precipitation mm (inches)	23.4 (0.92)	21.1 (0.83)	38.6 (1.52)	49.7 (1.96)	69.5 (2.74)	79.6 (3.13)	65.2 (2.57)	55.7 (2.19)	31.5 (1.24)	34.3 (1.35)	30.2 (1.19)	24.5 (0.96)	523.3 (20.60)
Average precipitation days (≥ 1.0 mm)	4.2	4.1	5.5	7.2	9.4	10.1	8.2	8.4	6.2	5.2	5.0	4.2	77.8
Average relative humidity (%)	72	74	77	82	86	87	86	83	79	75	72	72	79
Mean monthly sunshine hours	303	266	236	156	117	94	114	161	203	291	292	310	2,543
Source 1: Dirección Meteorológica de Chile (humidity, 1970–2000)
Source 2: NOAA (precipitation days 1991–2020), Deutscher Wetterdienst (sun, 1961–1990) (Note: Station ID for Balmaceda is 85874 Use this station ID to locate the sunshine duration)
