= JetSmart =

Chilean airline

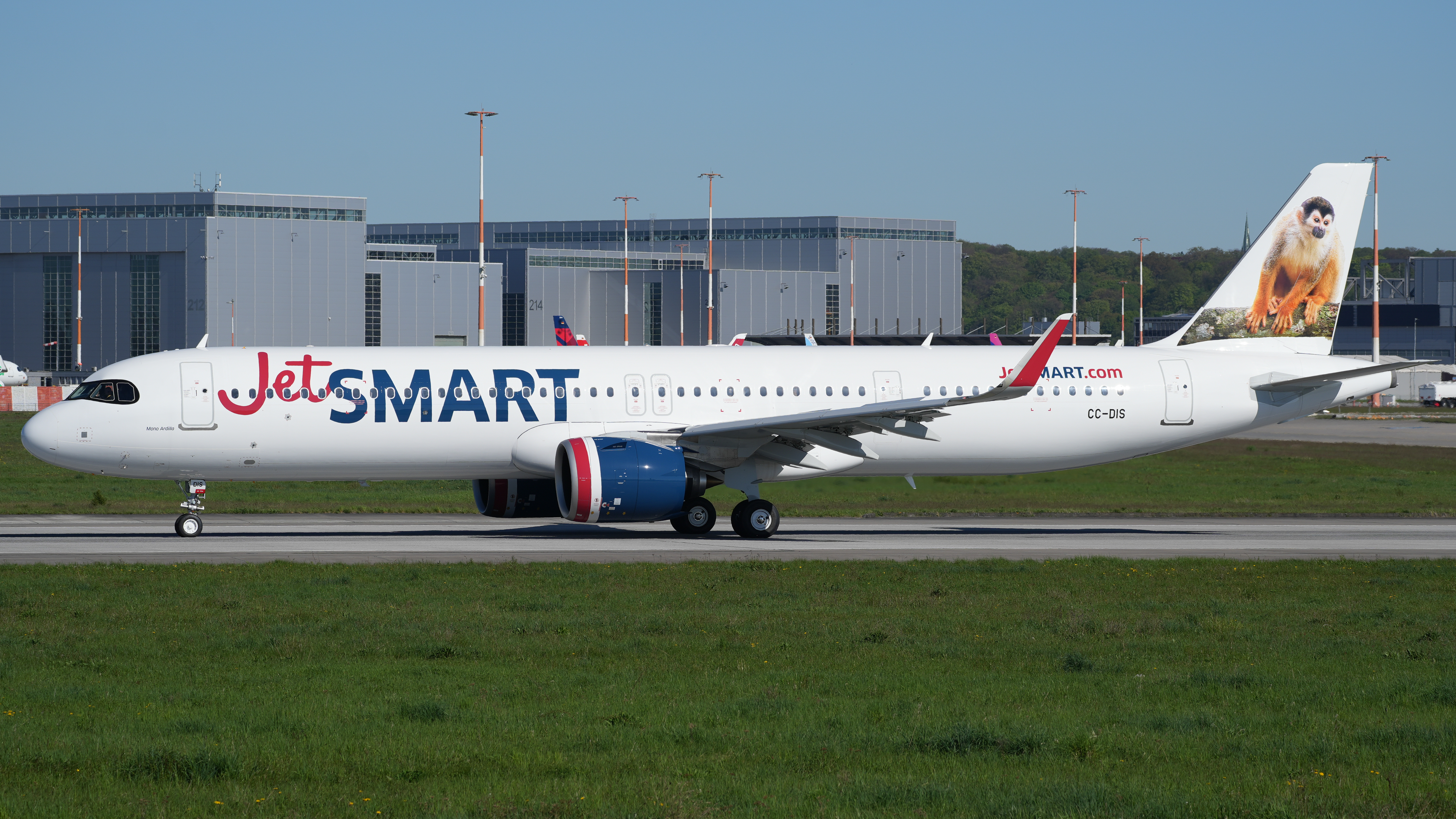
- JetSMART Airbus A321neo
IATA	ICAO	Call sign
JA	JAT	ROCKSMART
- Founded: 2016
- Commenced operations: 25 July 2017
- Operating bases: Arturo Merino Benítez International Airport; Carriel Sur International Airport
- Frequent-flyer program: AAdvantage
- Subsidiaries: JetSmart Argentina; JetSmart Colombia; JetSmart Perú
- Fleet size: 45
- Destinations: 33
- Parent company: Indigo Partners
- Headquarters: Santiago, Chile
- Key people: Estuardo Ortiz Porras (founder)
- Website: jetsmart.com/us/en/

JetSMART Airlines SpA, stylized as JetSMART, is a Chilean ultra low-cost carrier controlled by US investment fund Indigo Partners, which also controls low-cost carriers like Frontier Airlines, Mexico's Volaris and Hungary's Wizz Air. JetSmart's primary base of operations is Arturo Merino Benítez International Airport, servicing Santiago, Chile. It also owns and manages JetSmart Argentina, an Argentine subsidiary with a base at Aeroparque Jorge Newbery in Buenos Aires. The airline commenced scheduled operations on 25 July 2017 with a service from Santiago to Calama. Its CEO and founder is Estuardo Ortiz Porras.

== History ==
JetSmart requested an air operator's certificate (AOC) on 26 January 2017, and received its authorization in June 2017. Initially, the airline operated three Airbus A320-200 aircraft, but has since taken delivery of Airbus A320neo aircraft. Initially flying only domestic routes, JetSmart has expanded its presence in the South American market, setting up JetSmart Argentina to access further traffic rights to the country.

On 4 December 2019, JetSmart acquired Norwegian Air Argentina and took over its operations, staff, and license with immediate effect, with plans to merge the airline with JetSmart Argentina. Following the acquisition, it was to operate both from Aeroparque Jorge Newbery and El Palomar Airport in the Buenos Aires area. As Norwegian's Boeing 737 aircraft were not part of the transaction, JetSmart planned to replace them with the airline's own Airbus A320 family aircraft.

On 29 July 2021, American Airlines announced a minority investment in JetSmart, along with agreements to allow members of American Airlines' AAdvantage loyalty program to earn miles when flying on JetSmart.

On 16 June 2022, JetSmart commenced domestic operations in Peru, marking its expansion into a new market.

On 17 March 2023, JetSmart signed a memorandum of understanding (MoU) to purchase Ultra Air, and is proceeding with certifying JetSmart as an aircraft operator in Colombia.

== Fleet ==
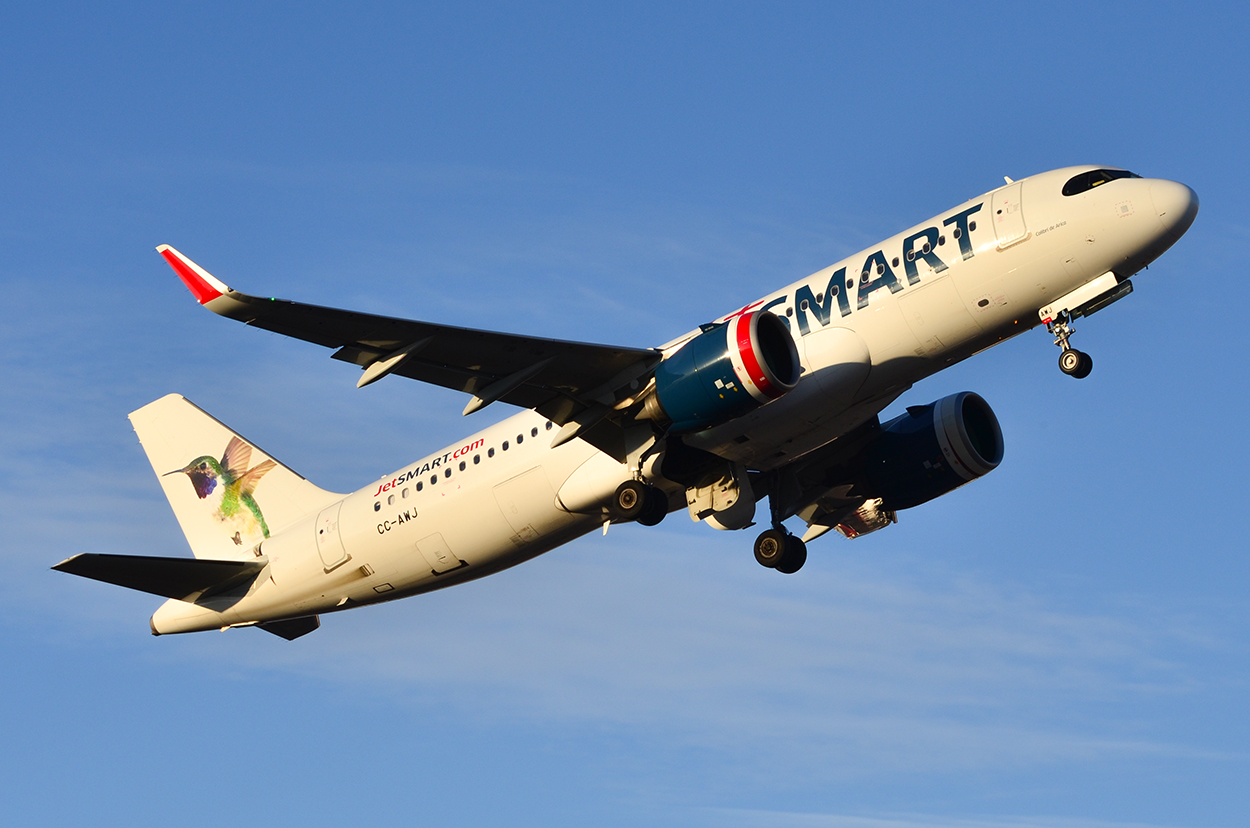
JetSmart Airbus A320neo

As of October 2025, the JetSmart Group operates an all-Airbus A320 family fleet composed of the following aircraft:

JetSmart fleet
Aircraft	In service	Orders	Passengers	Notes
Airbus A320-200	11	—	186	
Airbus A320neo	28	14	186	
Airbus A321neo	11	35	244	
Airbus A321XLR	—	14	TBA	
Total	50	63		

=== Fleet development ===
Countries served by JetSmart as of March 2026

In December 2017, the airline ordered 56 A320neos and 14 A321neos.

In June 2019, JetSmart ordered 12 A321XLRs. In October 2019, the first A320neo joined the fleet.

In November 2021, JetSmart ordered 22 A321neos and 2 A321XLRs and converted existing orders of A320neos to A321neos.

In July 2022, the airline leased 6 Airbus A320neos from BOC Aviation with deliveries scheduled in 2024. In the same month, the first A321neo was delivered. Also, it was reported that JetSmart expects to have a fleet of 100 aircraft by 2027.

== Destinations ==
JetSmart aimed to operate up to 10 aircraft in the 2018 period, and would go on to challenge LATAM Chile and Sky Airline in nearly every market introduced between July and December 2017.

=== Codeshare agreements ===
- American Airlines
