= List of defunct airlines of Chile =

This is a list of defunct airlines of Chile.

Airline	Image	IATA	ICAO	Callsign	Commenced operations	Ceased operations	Notes
Aerochile					1995	1996	
Aero Continente Chile		C7	NTI		1999	2002	
Aeroandina					1980	1981	
Aerocargo Regional					1991	1993	
AeroDesierto			DTO	AERODESIERTO	2014	2015	Renamed to Chilean Airways
Aeroguayacán			AGY	AEROGUAYACAN	1979	1988	
Aerolínea Principal		5P	PCP		2003	2009	Renamed to PAL Airlines
Aerolineas del Sur		3L	DLU	ARSA	2004	2007	Rebranded as Air Comet Chile
Aeronor Chile			ANS	AERONOR	1976	1986	
Air Comet Chile		3I	DLU	DEL SUR	2007	2008	
Alpine Air Express Chile		5A	AIH	ALPINE CHILE	2002	2004	An attempt by Alpine Air Express to enter the cargo market
Avant Airlines		OT	VAT	AVANT	1997	2001	
Chile Inter Airlines			CLE	CHILEINTER	1998	1999	
Chilejet		H8			2014	2018	
CINTA					1954	1959	
Fast Air Carrier		UD	FST	FASTER	1978	1998	Merged into Ladeco
Ladeco		UC	LCO	LADECO	1958	2001	Rebranded as LAN Express
LAN-Chile		LA	LAN	LAN	1929	2004	Renamed to LAN Airlines
LAN Airlines		LA	LAN	LAN	2004	2016	Renamed to LATAM Chile
LAN-Chile Cargo		UC	LCO	LAN CARGO	1992	2004	Renamed to LAN Cargo
LAN Cargo		UC	LCO	LAN CARGO	2004	2016	Renamed to LATAM Cargo Chile
LASA		UD			1968	1981	
Latin American Wings		H8	JMR	LAW	2015	2018	
LATISA					1980	1982	
Línea Aérea Iquiqueña					1977	c. 1982	
National Airlines		N4	NCN		1992	1998	Acquired by Avant Airlines
One Airlines			ONS	AIR DREAMS	2013	2020	
PAL Airlines		5P	PCP	PRINCIPAL	2009	2014	
Southeast Pacific Airways					1992	1993	Formed with help from American Airlines. Merged with National Airlines
Star Airlines Chile			GER		2004	2006	
Transportes Aéreos Suravia		TJ			1973	1975	

== See also ==
- List of airlines of Chile
- List of airports in Chile
