= LATAM (disambiguation) =

LATAM may refer to:

- LATAM Airlines, an airline holding company created by the merger of LAN Airlines and TAM Airlines
  - LATAM Argentina, the defunct Argentine subsidiary of LATAM Airlines Group
  - LATAM Brasil, the Brazilian subsidiary of LATAM Airlines Group
    - LATAM Cargo Brasil, the cargo carriage section of LATAM Brasil
  - LATAM Colombia, the Colombian subsidiary of LATAM Airlines Group
    - LATAM Cargo Colombia, the cargo carriage section of LATAM Colombia
  - LATAM Chile, formerly LAN Airlines, is a Chilean airline.
    - LATAM Cargo Chile, the cargo carriage section of LATAM Airlines
  - LATAM Ecuador, the Ecuadorian subsidiary of LATAM Airlines Group
  - LATAM Paraguay, the Paraguayan subsidiary of LATAM Airlines Group
  - LATAM Perú, the Peruvian subsidiary of LATAM Airlines Group
- LATAM Challenge Series, an auto racing series based in Mexico
- LATAM Cargo Mexico, the former name of Mas Air or just Mas, a Mexican cargo airline formerly affiliated with LATAM Airlines Group

== See also ==
- Latin America, also abbreviated LatAm
