= List of airlines of Chile =

This is a list of airlines which have an Air Operator Certificate issued by the Civil Aviation Authority of Chile.

== Scheduled airlines ==
Airline	IATA	ICAO	Callsign	Image	Hub airport(s)	Founded	Notes
Aerocord					El Tepual International Airport	1966	
Aerovías DAP	V5	DAP	DAP		Presidente Carlos Ibáñez del Campo International Airport	1979	Operates charter and scheduled flights.
Antarctic Airways	V5	DAP	DAP			1989	Owned by Aerovias DAP.
DAP Helicopteros		DHE	HELIDAP		Presidente Carlos Ibáñez del Campo International Airport	1989	
JetSmart	JA	JAT	ROCKSMART		Arturo Merino Benítez International Airport	2016	Low-cost airline owned by Indigo Partners. Started operating in 2017.
LATAM Airlines Group	LA	LAN	LAN CHILE		Arturo Merino Benítez International Airport	2016	Flag carrier
Sky Airline	H2	SKU	AEROSKY		Arturo Merino Benítez International Airport	2001	Second largest airline in Chile. Low-cost since 2015.

== Charter airlines ==
Airline	IATA	ICAO	Callsign	Image	Hub airport(s)	Founded	Notes
Aerocardal		CDA	CARDAL		Arturo Merino Benítez International Airport	1989	
Archipiélagos Servicios Aéreos					Marcel Marchant Airport	2009	
Barrick Servicios Mineros		BRI	BARRICK		La Florida Airport	2015	
LASSA - Línea de Aeroservicios		LSE			Arturo Merino Benítez International Airport	2002	
Línea Aérea SINAMI					Arturo Merino Benítez International Airport	2013	
Mineral Airways	V5	DAP	DAP			2012	Owned by Aerovias DAP.
Servicios Aéreos Río Baker		RBK	RIOBAKER		Andrés Sabella Gálvez International Airport	2009	

== Cargo airlines ==
Airline	IATA	ICAO	Callsign	Image	Hub airport(s)	Founded	Notes
LATAM Cargo Chile	UC	LCO	LAN CARGO		Arturo Merino Benítez International Airport; Miami International Airport	2016	

== See also ==
- List of airlines
- List of defunct airlines of Chile
