= PAL Airlines (Chile) =

PAL - Principal Airlines
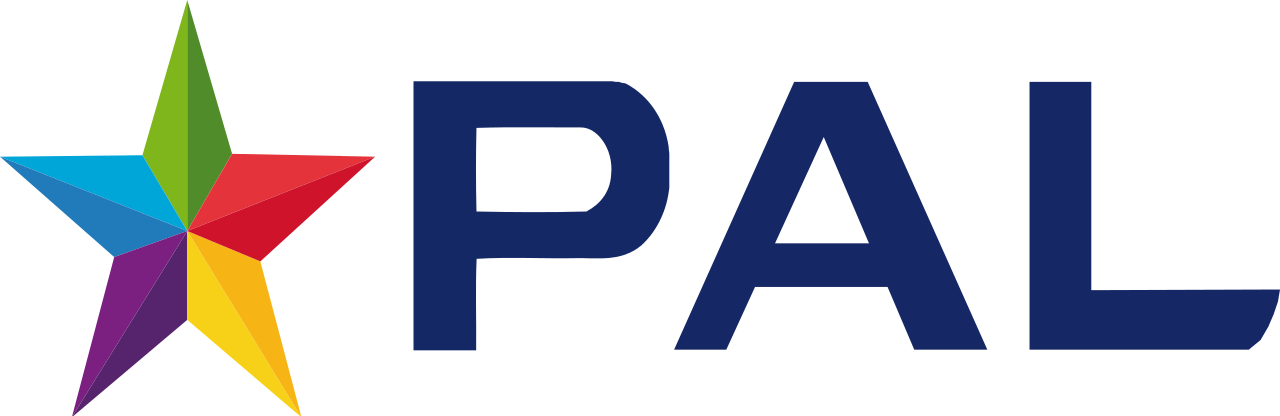
IATA	ICAO	Call sign
5P	PCP	PRINCIPAL
- Founded: September 2003
- Commenced operations: June 2009
- Ceased operations: September 2014
- Hubs: Arturo Merino Benítez International Airport
- Fleet size: 6
- Destinations: 5
- Headquarters: Las Condes, Chile
- Key people: Carlos Musiet (CEO)
- Website: www.palair.cl/

PAL Airlines (legally Aerolínea Principal Chile S.A.) was a Chilean airline that operated out of Arturo Merino Benítez International Airport in Santiago. The airline operated from 2003 to 2014, when it ceased all operations.

== History ==
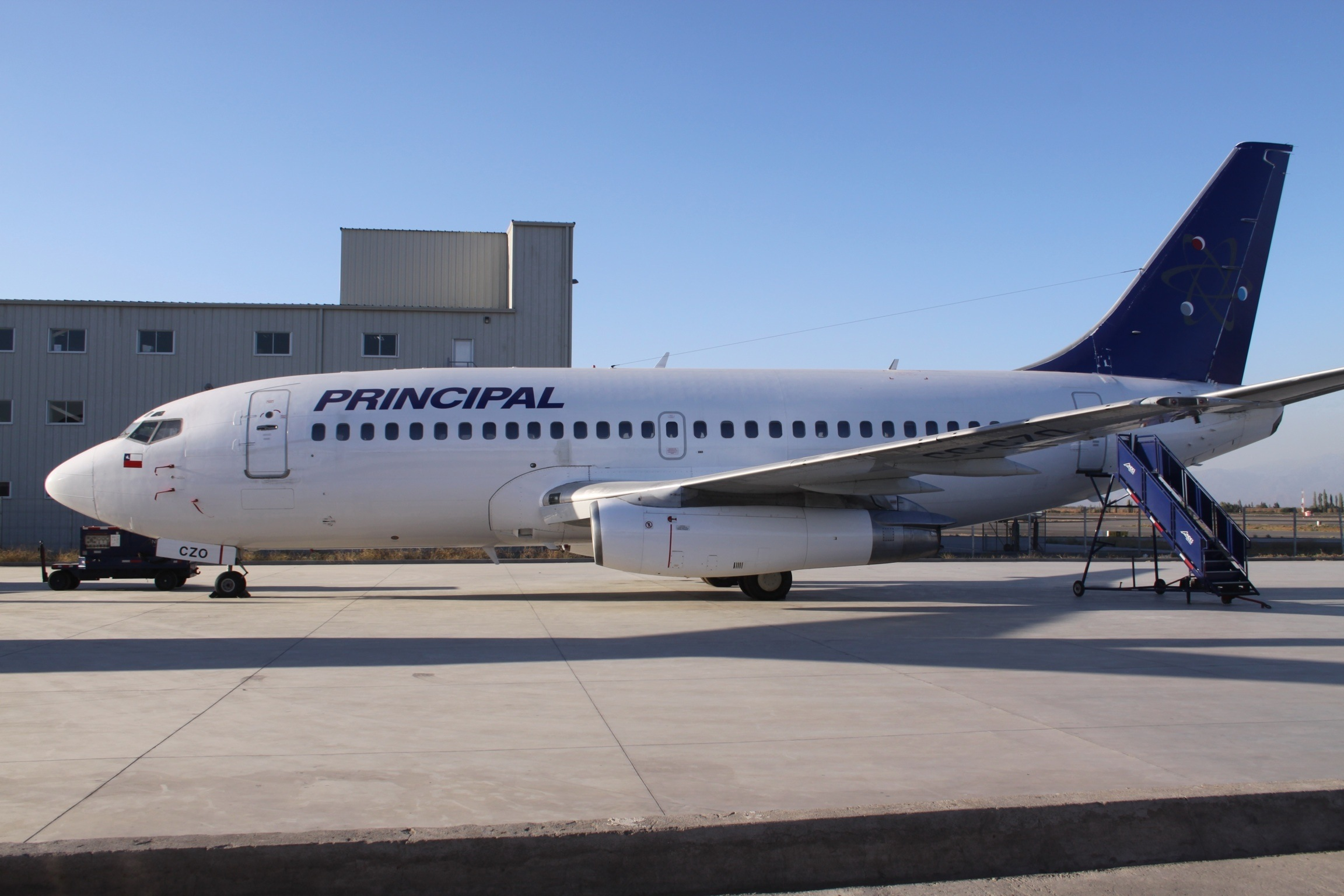
A Principal Boeing 737-200 parked at Arturo Merino Benítez International Airport in 2008

The airline was established as a charter airline in September 2003 and received approval for scheduled services in June 2009. It was owned by the Musiet family, who in the 1990s owned now-defunct National Airlines.

The airline ceased operations in September 2014 by the Directorate General of Civil Aeronautics due to unfavourable market conditions. In early 2015 it was declared bankrupt by a Chilean court.

== Destinations ==
PAL Airlines served the following scheduled destinations within Chile:

- Antofagasta - Cerro Moreno International Airport
- Calama - El Loa Airport
- Copiapó - Desierto de Atacama Airport
- Iquique - Diego Aracena International Airport
- Santiago - Arturo Merino Benítez International Airport - Hub

Additionally, the airline operated charter flights, mainly to Punta Cana.

== Fleet ==
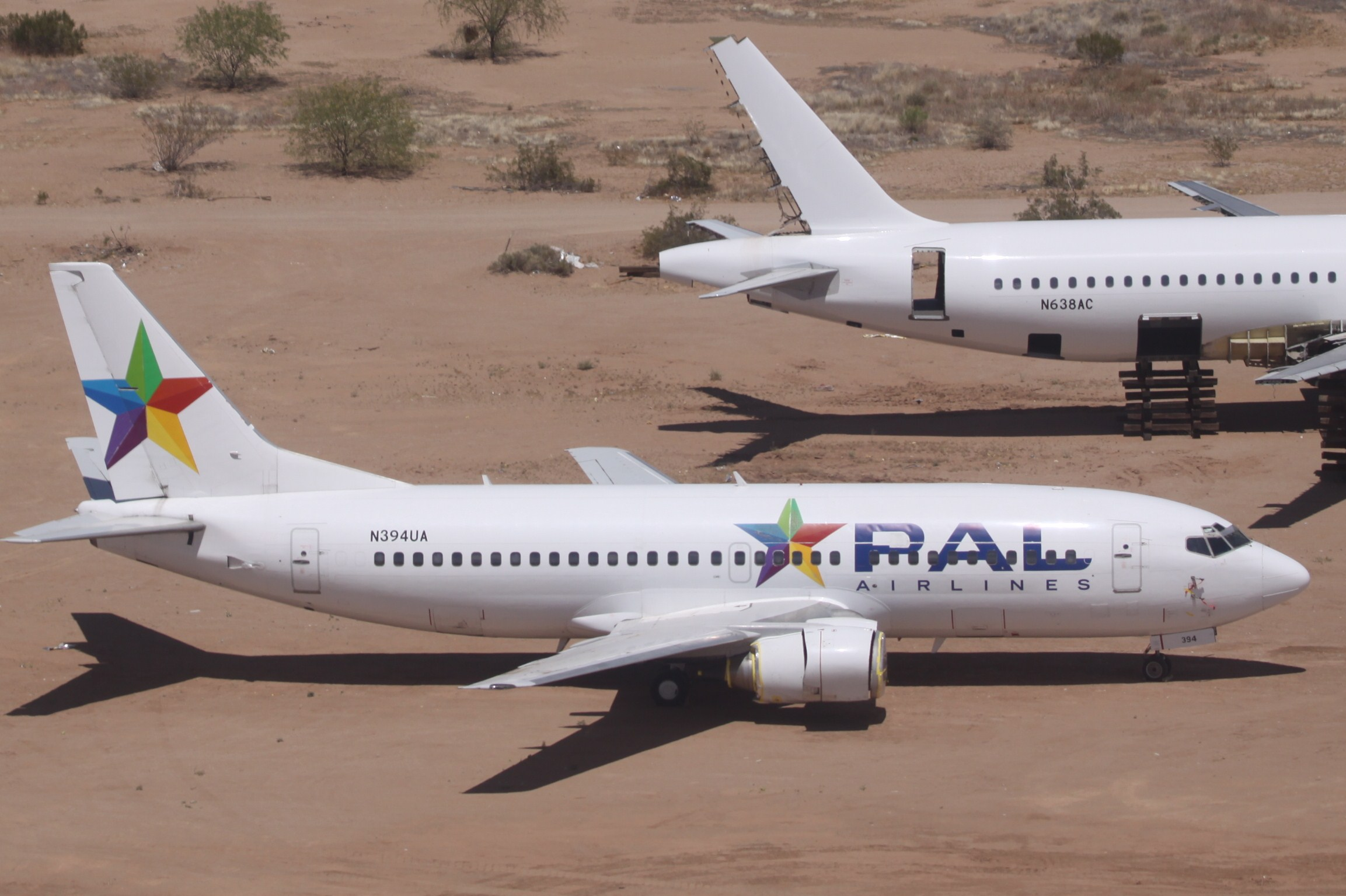
A PAL Airlines Boeing 737-300 stored at Pinal Airpark in 2013

The PAL Airlines fleet consisted of the following aircraft:

PAL Airlines fleet
Aircraft	Total	Introduced	Retired	Notes
Airbus A330-300	1	2010	2010	Leased from Orbest Orizonia Airlines
Airbus A330-300	1	2013	2013	Leased from Orbest Orizonia Airlines
Airbus A330-300	1	2014	2014	Leased from Air Europa
Airbus A340-300	1	2010	2010	Leased from Hi Fly
Boeing 737-200	4	2009	2014	
Boeing 737-300	1	2007	2008	
Boeing 737-300	4	2010	2014	
Boeing 737-400	1	2007	2007	Leased from Futura International Airways
Boeing 737-400	1	2008	2008	
Boeing 757-200	2	2010	2011	Leased from Privilege Style

== See also ==
- List of defunct airlines of Chile
