= Ladeco =

Chilean airline

IATA	ICAO	Call sign
UC	LCO	LADECO
- Founded: November 1, 1958
- Ceased operations: October 28, 2001 (rebranded as LAN Express)
- Hubs: Calama; Los Cerrillos; Santiago
- Focus cities: Antofagasta; Bogotá; Buenos Aires–Ezeiza; Miami
- Frequent-flyer program: PassClub (until 1998); LanPass (1998-2001)
- Subsidiaries: Ladeco Cargo
- Destinations: 48
- Parent company: LAN-Chile
- Headquarters: Santiago, Chile
- Founder: Juan Costabal Echeñique
- Website: www.ladeco.cl

Boeing 727 Miami 1988

Ladeco S.A. (acronym of Línea Aérea Del Cobre or the "Airline of Copper," in reference to the principal Chilean export.) was a Chilean airline.

== History ==
Ladeco was established on November 1, 1958, by Juan Costabal Echenique. It transported cargo and passengers from the mining camps in northern and central Chile, mainly belonging to Codelco. Later it operated international routes to the Caribbean and North America.

On August 11, 1995, LAN-Chile bought out the shares of Ladeco. At the time of the takeover, Ladeco was equipped mainly with Boeing 737s as well as some 727s and 757s. Ladeco then became exclusively an internal carrier between Chilean cities. In October 1998, Ladeco was merged with Fast Air Carrier. On October 28, 2001, Ladeco was officially rebranded as a new affiliate of LAN-Chile under the name LAN Express, and most internal operations were taken by. The brand was merged into LAN Airlines in 2006.

== Destinations ==
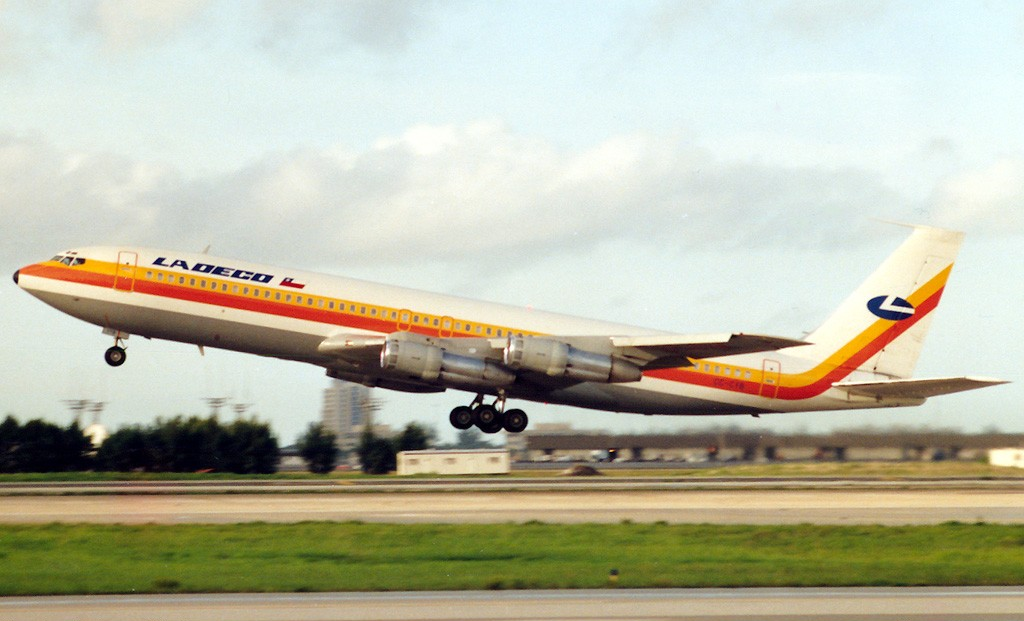
A Ladeco Boeing 707-320B at Miami International Airport in 1989

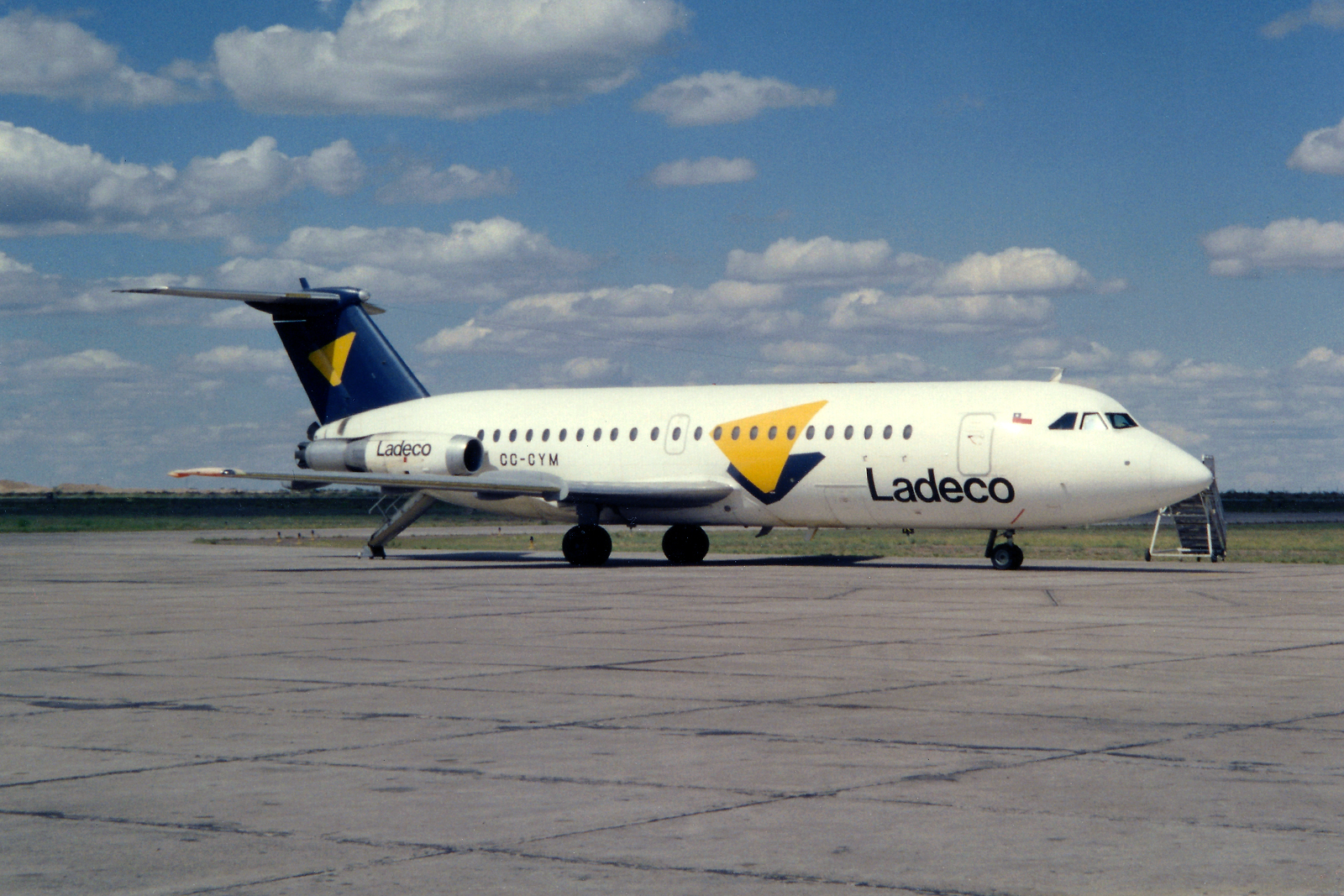
A Ladeco BAC One-Eleven at Governor Francisco Gabrielli International Airport in 1993

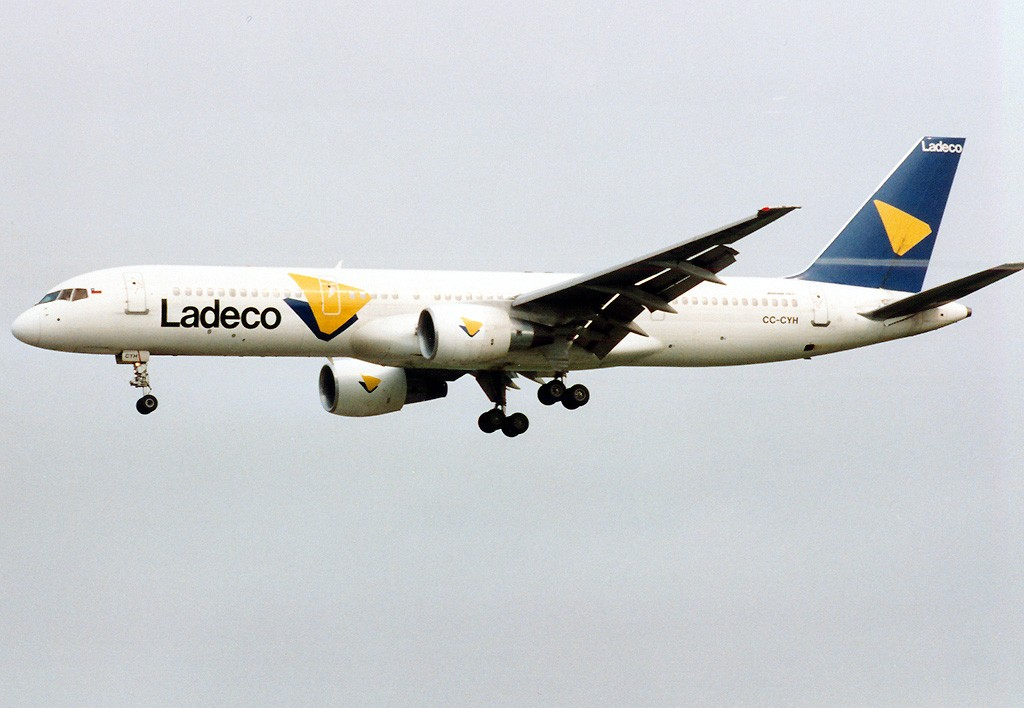
A Ladeco Boeing 757-200 approaching John F. Kennedy International Airport in 1994

United States

- New York City (John F. Kennedy International Airport)
- Baltimore/Washington (Baltimore-Washington International Airport)

== Fleet ==
The fleet of Ladeco included the following aircraft:

Ladeco fleet
Aircraft	Total	Introduced	Retired	Notes
Airbus A300B4	2	1995	1996	Leased from Carnival Air Lines
Airbus A320-200	1	1994	1995	Leased from LACSA
BAC One-Eleven Series 200AJ	2	1991	1994	
BAC One-Eleven Series 300AG	2	1990	1994	
Beechcraft 65	1	1966	Unknown	
Beechcraft 95	1	1965	1977	
Boeing 707-320C	3	1988	1994	
Boeing 727-100	6	1978	1995	
Boeing 737-200	20	1980	2001	
Boeing 737-300	2	1992	1996	
Boeing 757-200	2	1991	1996	
Douglas C-47 Skytrain	5	1958	1976	
Douglas DC-6B	7	1966	1979	
Douglas DC-8-71F	1	1992	1994	
Fokker F-27 Friendship	2	1987	1991	

During the 1960s, the airline operated some Douglas DC-3s, with their cargo fleet also including three Boeing 707s.

== Accidents and incidents ==
- On April 8, 1968, a Douglas C-49K (registration CC-CBM) crashed on approach to Balmaceda Airport killing all 36 people on board. The aircraft was operating a domestic scheduled passenger flight from Los Cerrillos Airport, Santiago.
- On May 17, 1999, a Boeing 737-200 (registration CC-CYR) was damaged beyond repairs after one of its fuel tanks burst into flames during refueling at Arturo Merino Benítez International Airport.

== See also ==
- List of defunct airlines of Chile
