= DLU =

DLU may refer to:

- IATA airport code for Dali Airport, China
- ICAO airline code for Air Comet Chile
