= Flight 160 =

Flight 160 can mean:

- Pan Am Flight 160 a cargo 707 flight which crashed in 1973 near Boston killing all three crew
- LAN-Chile Flight 160 a 727 flight that crashed in 1969 near Santiago but without injuries or fatalities
