= LAN Dominicana =

Dominican airline

| IATA | ICAO | Call sign |
|---|---|---|
| 4M | LNC | LANCANA |
- Founded: May 2003
- Commenced operations: June 16, 2003
- Ceased operations: 2005 (Merged back into LAN Airlines)
- Hubs: Punta Cana; Santo Domingo-Las Américas
- Frequent-flyer program: LanPass
- Fleet size: 2
- Destinations: 4
- Parent company: LAN Airlines (49%)
- Headquarters: Santo Domingo, Dominican Republic
- Key people: Julio Heinsen (President)
- Website: www.landominicana.com

LAN Dominicana (legally Líneas Aéreas Nacionales de Navegación Dominicana S.A.) was a short-lived airline based in Santo Domingo, Dominican Republic that operated international services.

== History ==
The airline was established in May 2003 and started flying to Miami on June 16, 2003. LAN Airlines had a 49% stake in LAN Dominicana.

In April 2005, the IATA code "4M" was reassigned to Aero 2000, which was officially designated as LAN Argentina in June 2005.

== Destinations ==
| Country | City | Airport | Notes |
|---|---|---|---|
| Chile | Santiago | Arturo Merino Benítez International Airport | |
| Dominican Republic | Punta Cana | Punta Cana International Airport | Hub |
| Dominican Republic | Santo Domingo | Las Américas International Airport | Hub |
| United States | Miami | Miami International Airport | |

== Fleet ==
LAN Dominicana had operated the following aircraft:

- 2 Boeing 767-300ER (Operated by LAN Airlines)

== See also ==
- List of defunct airlines of the Dominican Republic
