= Avant Airlines =

AVANT Airlines

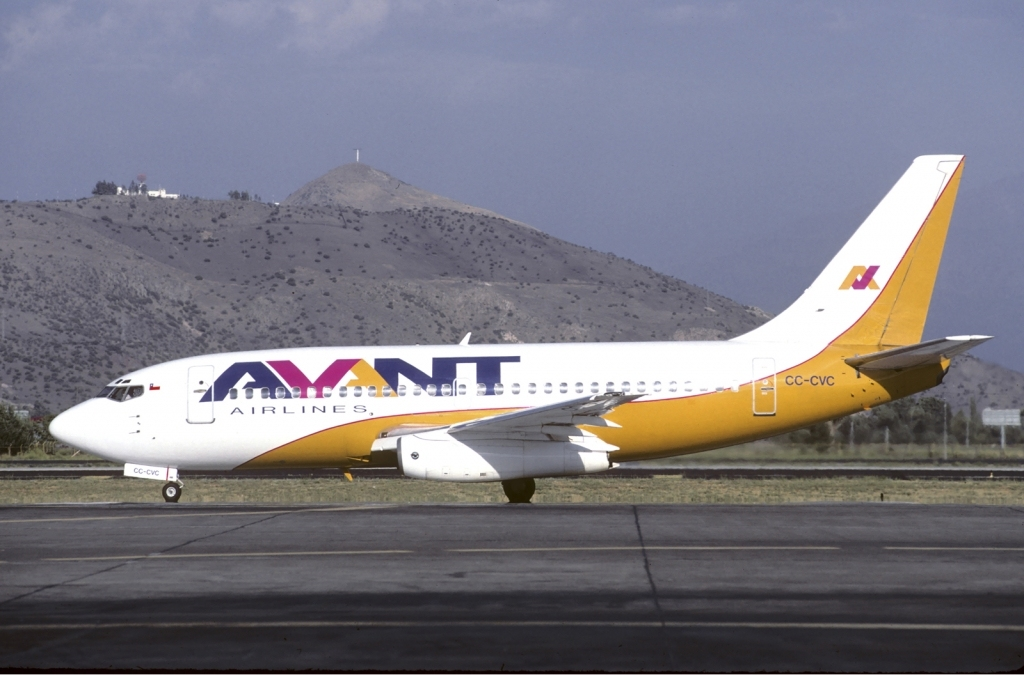
| IATA | ICAO | Call sign |
|---|---|---|
| OT | VAT | AVANT |
- Founded: 1997
- Ceased operations: March 10, 2001
- Hubs: Arturo Merino Benítez International Airport
- Fleet size: 10
- Destinations: 12
- Parent company: TurBus
- Headquarters: Santiago, Chile
- Employees: Rolando Uauy (CEO)

AVANT Airlines was a Chilean airline owned by the Diez family, which also owned bus company TurBus. It started flying in 1997 and closed down in 2001.

== History ==
AVANT Airlines made its first flight to La Serena in 1997. In the following months, AVANT was flying to different cities in Chile. In January 1998, it acquired another Chilean airline, National Airlines, for 24 million US Dollars.

In 1999, AVANT went into bankruptcy despite having 30% of the Chilean air market. Its last flight was on March 10, 2001, a flight from Calama to Santiago, bringing the airline's existence to an end.

== See also ==
- List of defunct airlines of Chile
