= LATAM Airlines Chile =

Chilean multinational airline

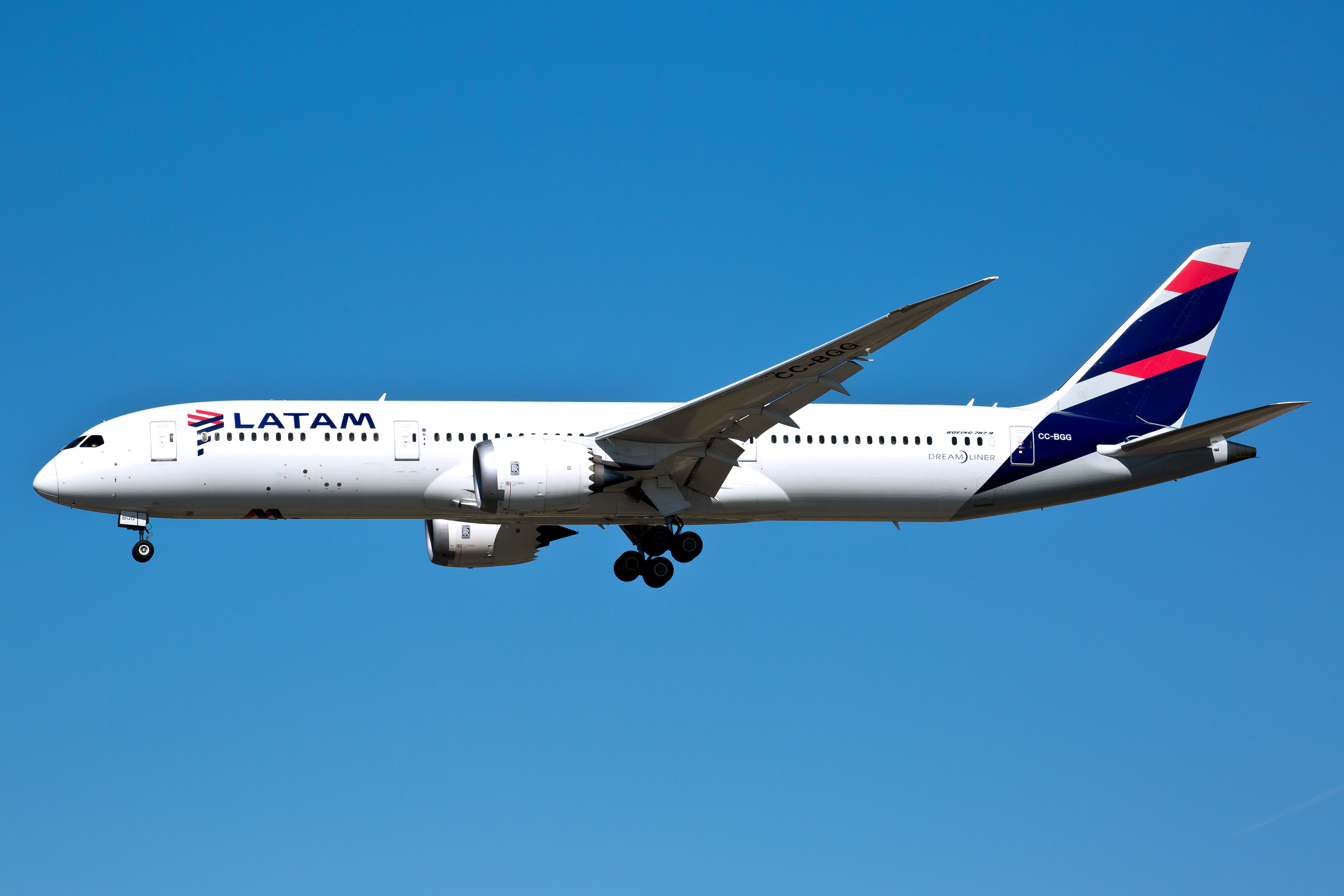
- LATAM Boeing 787-9 in 2023
IATA	ICAO	Call sign
LA	LAN/LXP	LAN CHILE
- Founded: March 5, 1929; 97 years ago (as Línea Aeropostal Santiago-Arica)
- Commenced operations: 1932; 94 years ago (as Línea Aerea Nacional); June 17, 2004; 22 years ago (as LAN Airlines); May 5, 2016; 10 years ago (as LATAM Chile)
- AOC #: LANF474J
- Hubs: Santiago
- Frequent-flyer program: LATAM Pass
- Parent company: LATAM Airlines Group
- Headquarters: Las Condes, Santiago, Chile
- Founder: Arturo Merino Benítez
- Revenue: ▲US$5.7 billion (2011)
- Net income: ▼US$320.2 million (2011)
- Website: www.latamairlines.com

LATAM Airlines Chile, formerly known as LAN Chile and LAN Airlines, is a Chilean multinational airline based in Santiago and one of the founding companies of the LATAM Airlines Group, the largest airline holding company in Latin America. Its main hubs are in the Arturo Merino Benítez International Airport in Santiago, Guarulhos International Airport in São Paulo and Jorge Chávez International Airport in Lima, with secondary hubs in Bogotá, Quito, Guayaquil and Asunción.

LAN was the flag carrier of Chile until its privatization in the 1990s; it is the predominant airline in Chile, Ecuador, and Peru, the largest carrier in Brazil, and the second-largest in Colombia, through its local subsidiaries. LATAM is the largest airline in Latin America, serving Latin America, North America, the Caribbean, Oceania, Asia, and Europe. The carrier was a member of the Oneworld airline alliance from 2000 until 2020.

LATAM Airlines Group was formed after the takeover by LAN of Brazilian airline TAM Linhas Aéreas, which was completed on June 22, 2012. In August 2015, it was announced that both airlines would rebrand as LATAM, with one livery to be applied on all aircraft by 2018. Currently, LATAM Chile and LATAM Brasil continue to work as separate companies, under LATAM Airlines Group acting as the parent company. LATAM Airlines Group is, as of 2024, the largest airline corporation in Latin America.

== History ==
=== Early years ===
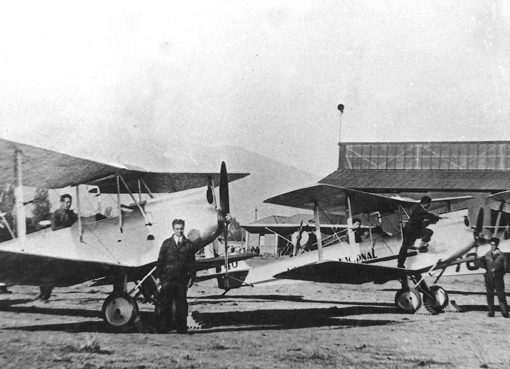
DH 60G Gipsy Moths in service with LAN Chile, 1933

The airline was founded by Chilean Air Force Commodore Arturo Merino Benítez (after whom Santiago International Airport is named), and began operations on March 5, 1929, as Línea Aeropostal Santiago-Arica (English: Postal Air Line Santiago-Arica), under the government of President Carlos Ibáñez del Campo. In 1932 It was rebranded as Línea Aérea Nacional de Chile (English: National Air Line of Chile), using the acronym LAN Chile as its commercial name. LAN Chile's first fleet consisted of de Havilland Moth planes.

Merino Benitez was a strong defender of Chilean carriers' exclusivity on domestic routes, differing from most Latin American countries which easily granted authorization on domestic flights to US-based Panagra, influenced by the propaganda made by Charles Lindbergh's Atlantic crossing. Also because of this reason, US-built airplanes became more difficult to incorporate to LAN's fleet until the beginning of WWII. In 1936, 2 French Potez 560 airplanes were purchased while in 1938, 4 German Junkers Ju 86Bs were incorporated into the fleet. During that same year, a cooperation agreement was established with Lloyd Aéreo Boliviano and the Peruvian carrier Faucett. Another agreement with Lufthansa was signed for flights to and from Europe and America's Atlantic coast.

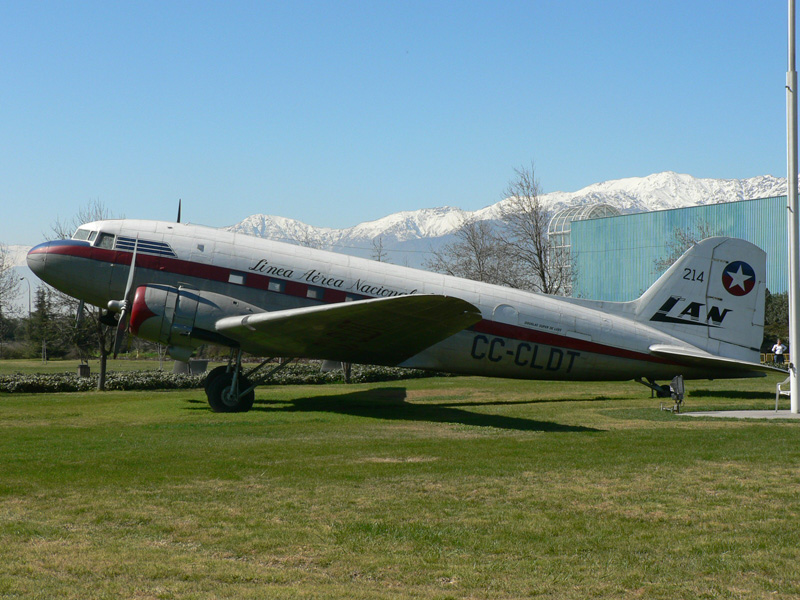
LAN-Chile Douglas DC-3, added to the fleet in 1945

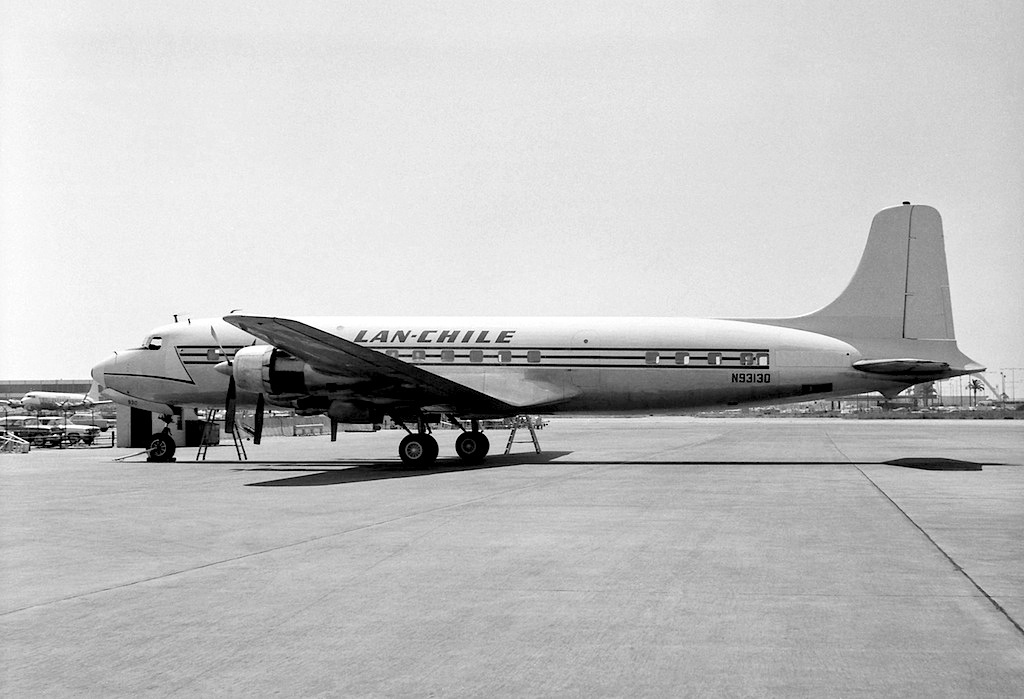
DC-6 at Los Angeles 1965

In 1940, given the restrictions imposed during WWII on access to spare parts for the Junkers BMW engines, LAN Chile had to replace them with Lockheed Model 10A Electras, adding in 1941 further Lockheed Lodestar C-60 and Douglas DC-3 in 1945.

=== Post-war and international service expansion ===
On August 23, 1945, LAN Chile became a member of the newly formed IATA. In October 1946, it started international service to Buenos Aires at Morón Airport and in 1947 to Punta Arenas, Chile's most distant continental destination.

In December 1954, LAN Chile made its first commercial flight to Lima, Perú. On December 22, 1956, a LAN Chile Douglas DC-6B made the world's first commercial flight over Antarctica. Since then, all of LAN's DC-6 fleet had painted on their fuselage Primeros sobre la Antártica ("The first over Antarctica"), using this same aircraft type for its first commercial service to Miami International Airport in 1958.

LAN Chile entered the jet era in 1963, purchasing three French Sud Aviation Caravelle VI-R, which initially flew to Miami, Guayaquil, Lima, Panama City and within Chile to Punta Arenas, Puerto Montt and Antofagasta.

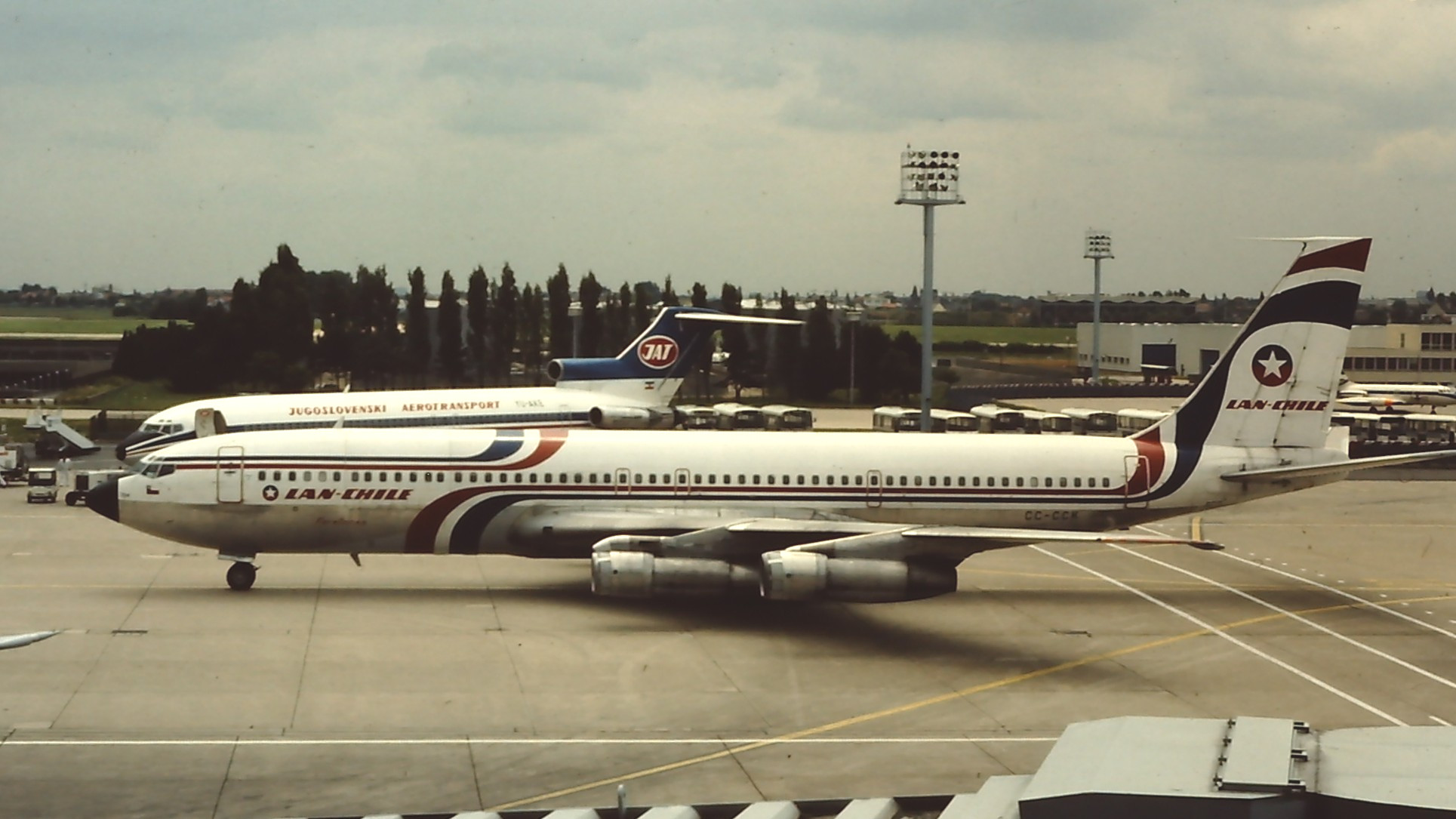
A LAN-Chile Boeing 707-320 at Paris-Orly Airport in 1981

In 1966, LAN Chile purchased its first Boeing 707 from Lufthansa, in exchange for flying rights in the Lima-Santiago route. With this aircraft model, the company developed new long-haul routes to the US, Oceania, and Europe. LAN-Chile started on April 15, 1967, the route Santiago-John F. Kennedy International Airport and Santiago-Easter Island on April 8. In October 1967 a LAN Chile Sud Aviation Caravelle made the first ILS landing in South America at Lima's Jorge Chávez International Airport. On January 16, 1968, the Santiago-Easter Island flight was extended to Papeete-Faa'a International Airport, in Tahiti, French Polynesia using a Douglas DC-6B. The airline then introduced Boeing 707 jet service on the Santiago – Easter Island –Papeete, Tahiti route in April 1970. On September 4, 1974, this route was extended to Fiji.

In 1969, LAN Chile expanded its destinations to Rio de Janeiro, Asunción and Cali with new Boeing 727s. In 1970, with Boeing 707s, LAN Chile opened its first transatlantic routes to Madrid–Barajas Airport, Frankfurt Airport and Paris-Orly.

Since its inception and until 1970, the airline had its headquarters, main hub, and maintenance center at Los Cerrillos Airport, in southwest Santiago. The restrictions imposed by the growing metropolitan area of Santiago and the need for modern, jet-era airport facilities that could safely accommodate both domestic and intercontinental flights, drove the need to relocate the Chilean capital's principal airport from Los Cerrillos to the denser southwest metropolitan region of Santiago to the more rural northwest metropolitan area. For this reason, Santiago International Airport in Pudahuel was built between 1961 and 1967, fully moving LAN Chile's flights to this new airport in 1970.

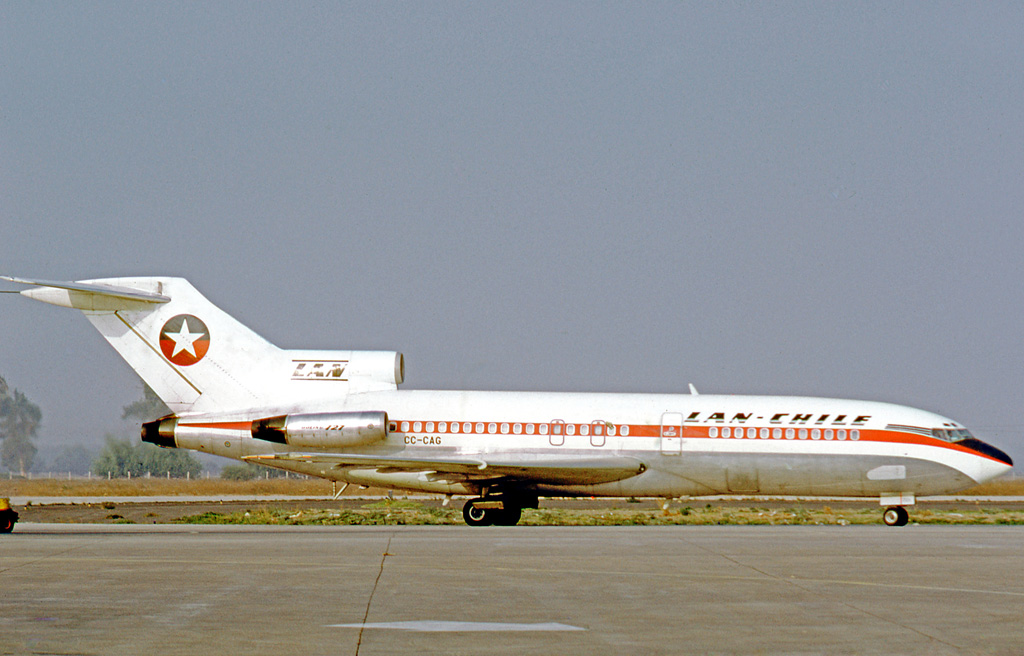
LAN Chile Boeing 727-100 at Pudahuel Airport Santiago in 1972

On February 10, 1974, a LAN-Chile Boeing 707 flown by captain Jorge Jarpa Reyes made the world's first transpolar non-stop flight between South America (Punta Arenas Airport) and Australia (Sydney Airport).

In 1980, the company replaced its Boeing 727s with the Boeing 737-200 on its domestic routes. Also, McDonnell Douglas DC-10-30s, LAN Chile's first wide-body jets, were added for use on routes to Los Angeles, Miami, and New York. That same year, the maintenance facilities were relocated from Los Cerrillos to Arturo Merino Benítez Airport.

In 1985, LAN-Chile implemented a program of flights around the world called Cruceros del Aire ("Air Cruises"), pioneers and unique in Latin America. The initial version included two flights per year (April 26 and September 26) on a Boeing 707 named Three Oceans because it crossed the Atlantic, Indian and South Pacific oceans, visiting 18 different places. The aircraft was specially prepared for these flights. It had 80 seats in first class, thus providing passengers with ample room for their comfort. Eighty tourists were selected for a 31-day tour that included visits to the main cities of Africa, Asia and Oceania. Such flights were made until 1989, marketed according to their route under various names such as "Around the World", "Three Oceans", "Three Continents", "Mediterranean","East-West China", etc.

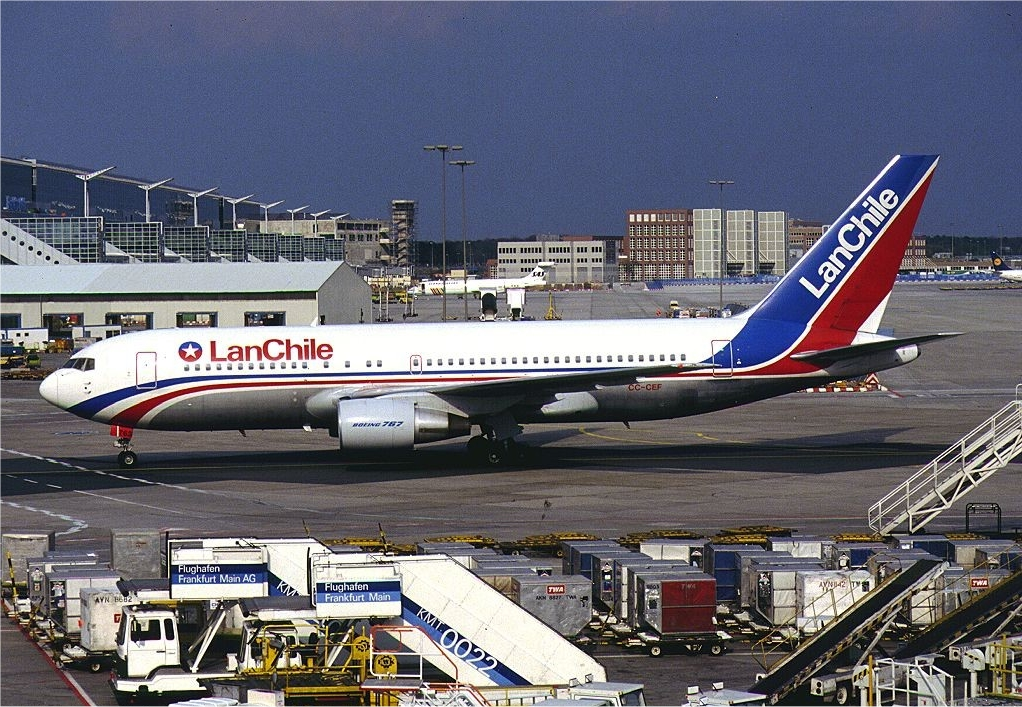
A former LAN-Chile Boeing 767-200ER at Frankfurt Airport in 1994

In June 1986, Boeing 767-200ERs replaced the DC-10 fleet, with a new route to Montréal–Mirabel International Airport.

In 1988, LAN Chile started construction of its maintenance center at Santiago Airport and added a Boeing 747-100 on lease from Aer Lingus to its fleet during the summer season for its US flights.

=== Privatization and internationalization ===
LAN's logo (2004–2016)

In September 1989, the Chilean government privatized the carrier, selling a majority stake in the company to Icarosan and Scandinavian Airlines (49%), which subsequently sold its stake a few years later to local investors. Since 1994, major shareholders have been the Cueto Family and businessman Sebastián Piñera (until 2010), who sold his shares when taking office as President of the Republic of Chile.

The approval from the Chilean Anti-Trust Authority resulted in the acquisition of the country's second-largest airline Ladeco on August 11, 1995. In October 1998, LAN-Chile merged its cargo subsidiary Fast Air Carrier with Ladeco, forming LAN Express.

In 1998, LAN established a joint venture with Lufthansa called LLTT (Lufthansa-LAN Technical Training S.A.) with the aim of satisfying the needs for aircraft maintenance training in Latin America. LLTT was based at LAN's hangars in Arturo Merino Benítez Airport. LLTT was the only A320 Maintenance Simulator (CMOS) training provider in Latin America.

In 2000, LAN Cargo opened up a major operations base at Miami International Airport and currently operates one of its largest cargo facilities there.

In 2002, LAN Chile started its internationalization process through LAN Perú and LAN Ecuador.

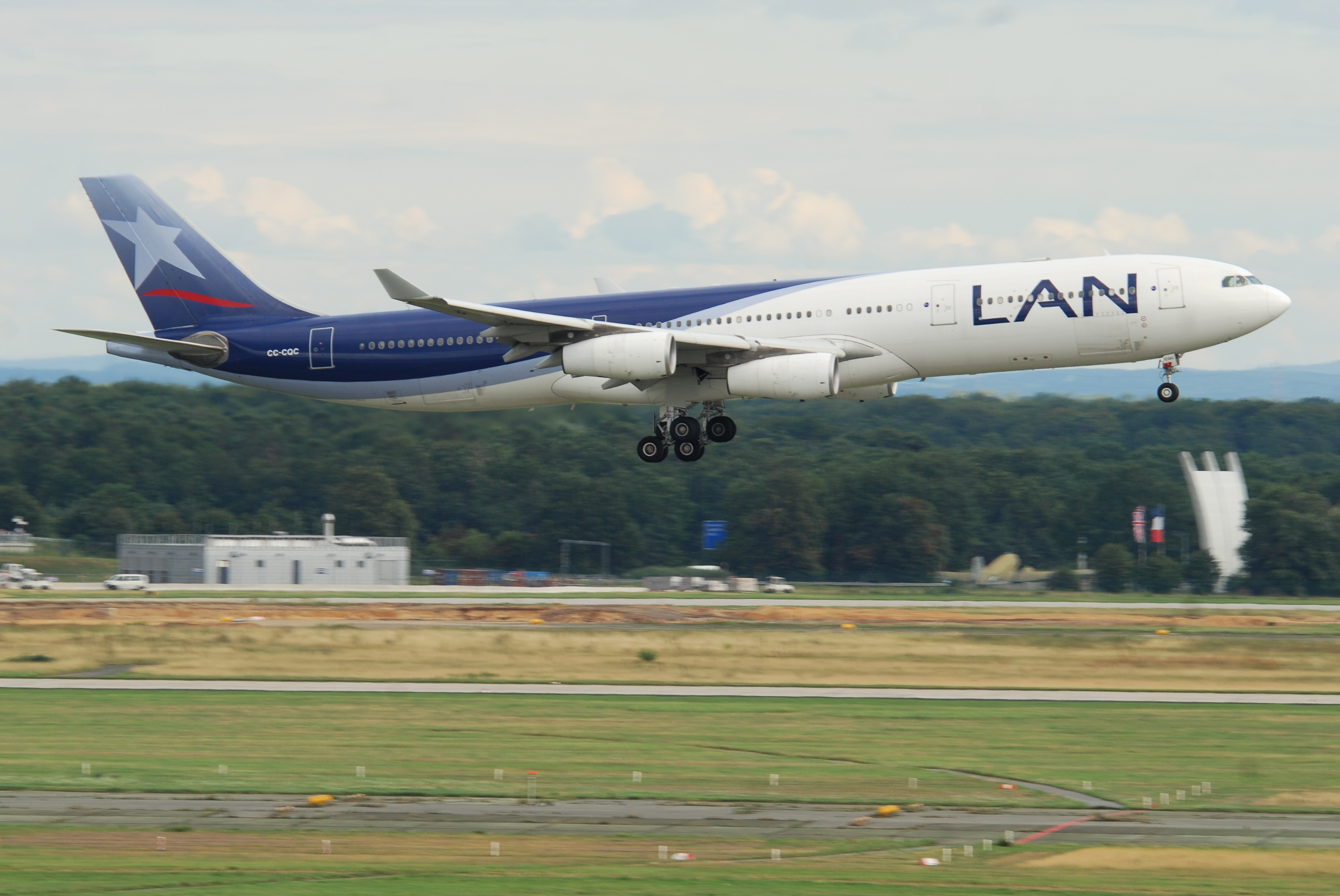
A former LAN Airlines Airbus A340-300 landing at Frankfurt Airport in 2010

In March 2004, LAN-Chile and its subsidiaries, LAN Perú, LAN Ecuador, LAN Dominicana and LAN Express, became unified under the unique LAN brand and livery, eliminating each airline country name on the brands. On June 17, 2004, LAN-Chile changed its formal name to LAN Airlines (which was said to mean Latin American Network Airlines, even though the airline says LAN is no longer an acronym) as part of this re-branding and internationalization process; although, when founded in 1929, LAN originally meant "Línea Aérea Nacional" (National Airline).

In March 2005, LAN opened its subsidiary LAN Argentina in Argentina and operates national and international flights from Buenos Aires, and is the third-largest local operator behind Aerolíneas Argentinas and Austral. This subsidiary is also under the LAN brand.

As of August 1, 2006, LAN merged first and business classes of service into a single class, named Premium Business.

On October 28, 2010, LAN acquired 98% of the shares of AIRES, the second-largest air carrier in Colombia. On December 3, 2011, AIRES started operating as LAN Colombia under the unified LAN livery.

On May 5, 2016, LANPass was rebranded as LATAM Pass, once LAN Chile fully transitioned into LATAM Chile.

Since May 5, 2016, LAN has been operating as LATAM Airlines. The airline opened many routes during 2017, one of them being the longest flight in their history: Santiago to Melbourne, which started operating October 5 of that year.

=== Forming LATAM Airlines Group ===
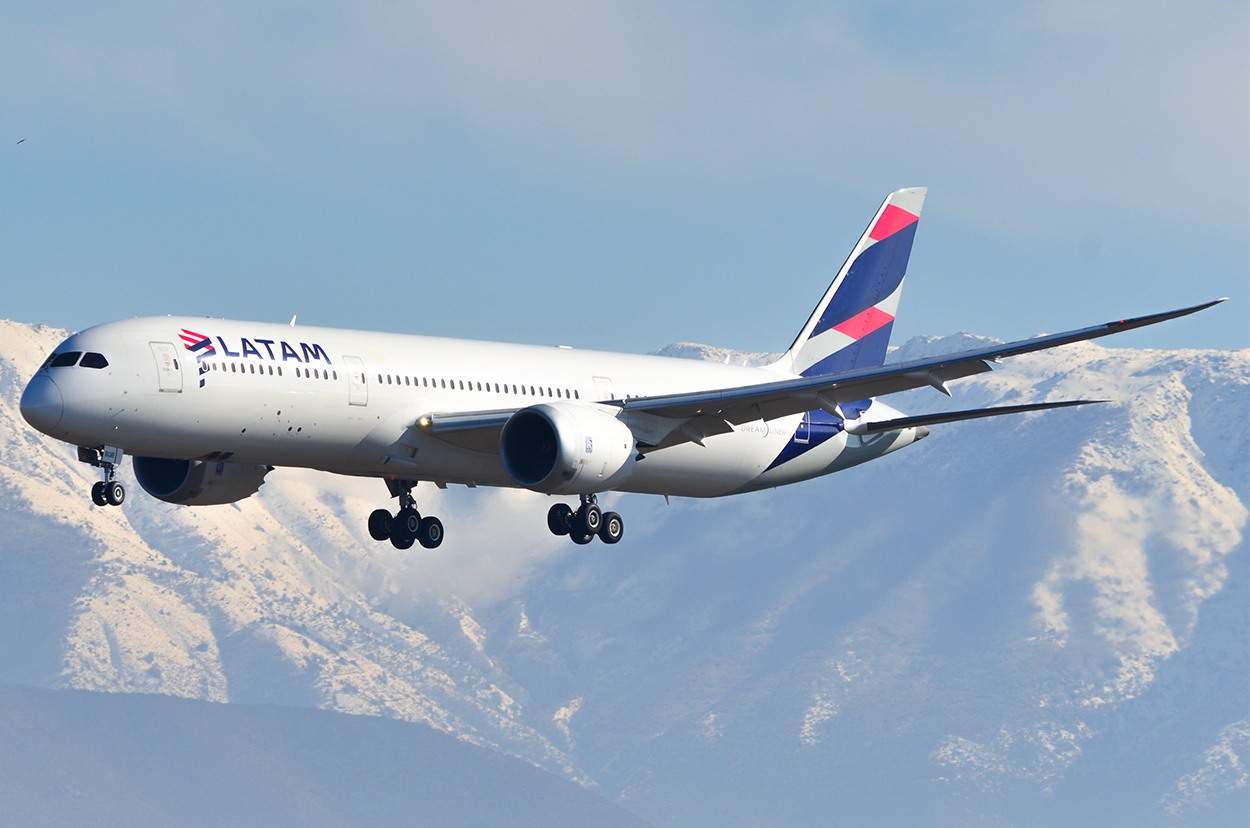
The flagship aircraft of LATAM Chile is the Boeing 787–9 Dreamliner, which flies mainly medium to long haul routes, as well as a few domestic routes.

On August 13, 2010, LAN Airlines signed a non-binding agreement with Brazilian Airline TAM Linhas Aéreas for the purchase of LAN from TAM Linhas Aéreas to form the LATAM Airlines Group. The purchase was completed on June 22, 2012. The Brazilian Administrative Council for Economic Defense ("CADE") and the Court for the Defense of Free Competition ("TDLC") approved the purchase subject to mitigation measures. The airlines have to relinquish four daily slot pairs from São Paulo-Guarulhos International Airport to other airlines willing to fly the Santiago-São Paulo route, waive membership in Star Alliance (of which TAM Linhas Aéreas was a member) or Oneworld, and interline agreements with other airlines operating selected routes, among other provisions. It still continued to use its "LAN CHILE" call sign, as well as its post-merger IATA and ICAO identities for its LATAM-operated flights.

== Corporate affairs ==
The airline has its headquarters on the 20th floor of the 5711 Avenida Presidente Riesco Building in Las Condes, Santiago Province. Previously its headquarters were in Estado 10 in downtown Santiago de Chile.

=== Former subsidiaries ===
- AerOasis
- Fast Air Carrier
- Florida West International Airways (25%) - sold its shares to Atlas Air.
- Ladeco
- LAN Box USA - American shipping network.
- LAN Courier - Logistic distributor, renamed to Blue Express in 2008 and sold in 2011.
- LAN Dominicana
- LATAM Airlines Argentina - Ceased operations in 2020.
- Lufthansa LAN Technical Training - A joint venture with Lufthansa.
- Mas Air (39.5%) - sold its shares in 2018.

== Destinations ==
LATAM Chile was a popular choice for surfers traveling to South America because of their policy of not charging extra baggage fees. However, starting on December 19, 2016, they changed their policy and now charge US$200 per way for a surfboard bag of up to three boards.

On October 5, 2017, LATAM Chile inaugurated their direct route between Santiago and Melbourne, a 15-hour (westbound) and 11,300 kilometres (6,100 nmi) flight. It is currently the southernmost commercial point-to-point flight. The flight's great circle passes south of the Antarctic Circle, at a distance of about 800 km from the Antarctic mainland.

In November 2017, the company announced the opening of a direct air route to Asia. The route operated with a flight departing from Santiago, Chile with a stop in São Paulo, Brazil, and from there it proceeded directly to Tel Aviv, Israel. The flights were operated three times a week starting from December 2018 until 2020, using the company's Boeing 787. This was the second air route operated by a South American company from South America to Asia.

== Fleet ==
=== Fleet development ===
LAN was the launch customer for the Pratt & Whitney PW6000 engine on the Airbus A318. Its Airbus A319s and Airbus A320s are equipped with the IAE V2500s or CFM56s engines. LATAM overhauled its Boeing 767s, adding amenities like flatbed seats in Premium Business class, which offers 180 degrees of recline, and new touchscreen personal TVs with on-demand content.

In May 2008, LAN Chile retired its last 737 from service and was replaced by the Airbus A320s. In addition to its A320 family aircraft and Boeing 767, LATAM purchased the Boeing 787 for its long-haul routes to Auckland, Sydney, and selected European routes, replacing its Airbus A340-300s that left the fleet in April 2015. In 2011, LAN Chile ordered 10 A318s but sold them to Avianca Brasil, in order to purchase another 128 jets from the A320 family and one more A340-300. That year the airline placed orders for more Airbus A320 and brand new Airbus A321 aircraft. LATAM Chile is the American launch customer for the Sharklets for its A320 fleet.

In 2012, LAN Chile became the launch customer in the Americas of the Boeing 787 Dreamliner. On November 23, 2014, the airline received their first Airbus A321. This has been the domestic flagship of the airline ever since. On April 17, 2015, the airline officially retired the Airbus A340-300 from their fleet, the last one being CC-CQA. In December 2017 the airline received their first Airbus A320neo. However, months later these were grounded due to an issue with the Pratt & Whitney PW1000G engines. LATAM faced many problems caused by both groundings of the A320neo and Boeing 787 aircraft in 2018. Later that year, they started recovering from that.

In 2021, LATAM acquired four Boeing 787-9 aircraft that used to fly for Norwegian Air Shuttle, which entered service in late 2022.

In September 2025 the LATAM Group ordered 24 Embraer 195-E2 with 50 further purchase options. First deliveries are expected in late 2026, with the initial batch going to LATAM Brasil.

==== Former fleet ====
LATAM Chile has formerly operated the following aircraft:

LATAM Chile former fleet
Aircraft	Total	Introduced	Retired	Notes
Airbus A318-100	15	2007	2013	Used on domestic routes All aircraft sold to Avianca Brasil. Used to be one of the few A318 operators with the PW6000 engines, instead of the more common CFM56.
Airbus A330-200	2	2019	2019	Wet-leased from Wamos Air
Airbus A340-300	5	2000	2015	
BAe 146-200	3	1990	1997	
Boeing 707-320	11	1967	1994	Operated first scheduled international flight to Frankfurt. (via Paris–Orly, Madrid and São Paulo)
Boeing 727-100	5	1968	1979	
Boeing 737-200	33	1980	2008	
Boeing 747-100	1	1989	1990	Leased from Aer Lingus
Boeing 747-400	1	2018	2018	Wet-leased from Wamos Air.
Boeing 757-200	1	1996	1997	
Boeing 767-200ER	6	1986	1997	
Boeing 777-200ER	2	2018	2019	Leased from Boeing Capital
Consolidated PBY Catalina	1	Unknown	Unknown	
Convair 340	4	1961	1965	
Curtiss T-32 Condor II	3	1935	1942	
de Havilland Canada DHC-6 Twin Otter	6	1974	1974	Acquired but never entered service. Transferred to the Chilean Air Force.
de Havilland DH.60 Moth	2	1929	Unknown	
de Havilland DH.104 Dove	12	1949	1955	
Douglas C-47 Skytrain	18	1946	1979	
Douglas DC-6B	10	1955	1973	Operated first long-haul flight to Miami (via Lima and Panama City)
Fairchild FC-2	7	1932	1939	
Ford 5-AT-DS Trimotor	3	1930	1938	
Hawker Siddeley HS 748	9	1967	1978	
Junkers W.34	1	Unknown	Unknown	
Junkers Ju 52	1	1938	1938	
Junkers Ju 86	4	1938	1940	
Lockheed Model 10A Electra	6	1941	1955	
Lockheed Model 18 Lodestar	2	1943	1944	
Martin 2-0-2	4	1947	1958	
McDonnell Douglas DC-10-30	5	1980	1986	
Potez 56	11	1936	1943	
Sud Aviation Caravelle	3	1964	1975	Operated first long-haul flight to New York City (via Lima, Bogotá and Montego Bay)
Sikorsky S-43	2	1936	Unknown	

== Accidents and incidents ==
- On April 3, 1961, LAN Chile Flight 621, a Douglas C-47A registered as CC-CLD, on a scheduled domestic passenger flight from Temuco Airport (now Maquehue Airport, later La Araucania Airport) to Santiago, crashed into a hillside due to inclement weather near La Gotera Hill, Chile. On board were many members of the Chilean association football club C.D. Green Cross. All four crew members and all twenty passengers on board were killed.
- On February 6, 1965, a Douglas DC-6, operating LAN Chile Flight 107 from Santiago to Ezeiza, Argentina, flew into a mountain near the San José Volcano in the Las Melosas area of the Andes shortly after takeoff. All of the 87 passengers and crew on board died in what is as of 2012 the worst aircraft accident in Chile.
- On April 28, 1969 LAN Chile Flight 160 crashed short of the runway at Colina, Chile. None of the 60 passengers and crew were injured in the accident.
- On December 5, 1969, a Douglas C-47A registration CC-CBY, crashed shortly after takeoff from El Tepual Airport, Puerto Montt. The aircraft was operating a cargo flight; all three people on board survived.
- On May 25, 1972, Lan Chile Flight 154, a Boeing 727-100 registration CC-CAG, made an emergency landing at Sir Donald Sangster International Airport after a pipe bomb exploded on board. The aircraft was operating a passenger flight from Tocumen International Airport to Miami International Airport; there were no fatalities or injuries.
- On August 3, 1978, a Boeing 707 registered as CC-CCX was approaching Ministro Pistarini International Airport in thick fog when it struck trees in a gentle descent, some 2500 meters short of the runway threshold and 300 meters out of line with the runway centreline. All 63 people on board the aircraft survived the accident.
- On August 4, 1987, a Boeing 737-200, while on the approach at El Loa Airport, landed short of the displaced threshold of runway 27. The nosegear collapsed and the aircraft broke in two. A fire broke out 30 minutes later and destroyed the aircraft. The threshold was displaced by 880m due to construction work. There was one fatality.
- On February 19, 1991, a chartered BAe 146–200 operating LAN Chile Flight 1069, overran the runway on landing at Puerto Williams in southern Chile and sank in the nearby waters. Of the 73 people aboard, 20 perished.
- On May 18, 2013, an Airbus A340 departing for Sydney from Auckland Airport lined up on what was thought to be the center line of the runway. Instead, it was actually the lights on the edge of the runway and the crew took off without noticing it. The damage wasn't discovered until a runway inspection was made.
- On October 26, 2022, LATAM Chile Flight 1325, an Airbus A320-214, was on approach to Silvio Pettirossi International Airport when the aircraft encountered a hail storm. The aircraft lost most of its nose radome, suffered damage to its windshield, and lost both engines which led to the Ram air turbine being deployed. The aircraft made an emergency landing at Asunción with no injuries aboard.
- On August 14, 2023, LATAM Chile Flight 505, a Boeing 787–9 Dreamliner, was cruising 120 miles north of Panama City when the captain became incapacitated and collapsed in the restroom. The relief captain and first officer diverted the aircraft to Panama City's Tocumen International Airport. The captain was pronounced dead by medical crews on landing.
- On March 11, 2024, LATAM Airlines Flight 800, a Boeing 787–9 on its way to Auckland, New Zealand, from Sydney, Australia experienced what was described as a technical event during the flight which caused strong movement before landing at Auckland Airport. As a result, 50 people on board were injured, of which 12 were hospitalized and one received possible serious injuries.

== See also ==
- List of airlines of Chile
