= LAN-Chile Flight 160 =

1969 aviation accident

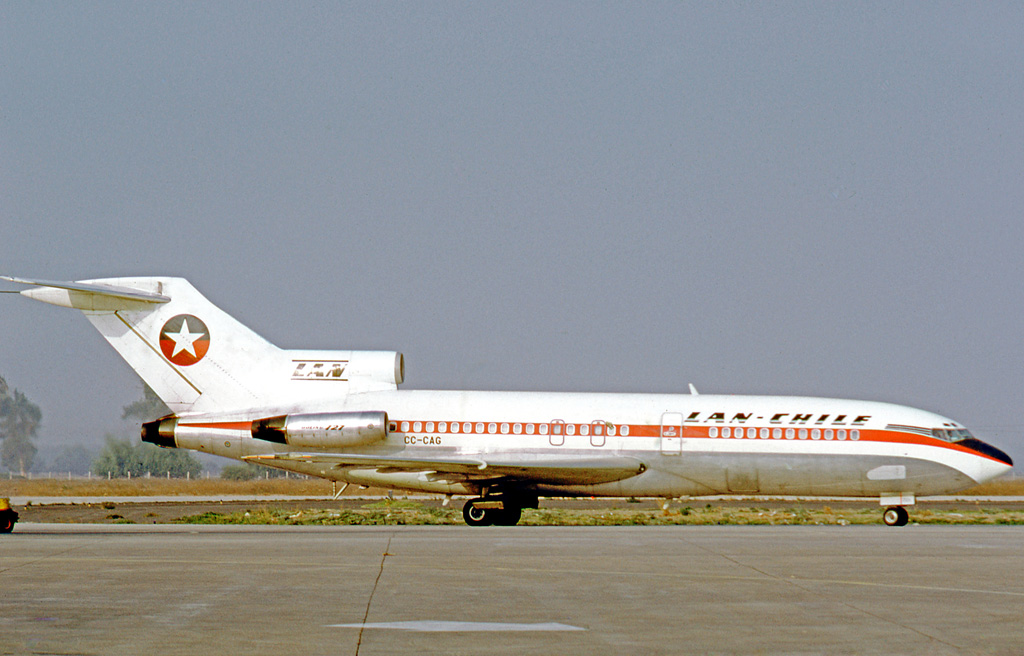
- A Boeing 727 similar to the accident aircraft

Accident
- Date: April 28, 1969
- Summary: Controlled flight into terrain
- Site: Near Colina, Chile

Aircraft
- Aircraft type: Boeing 727-116
- Operator: LAN-Chile
- Registration: CC-CAQ
- Flight origin: Ministro Pistarini International Airport, Argentina
- Destination: Arturo Merino Benítez International Airport, Chile
- Occupants: 60
- Passengers: 52
- Crew: 8
- Fatalities: 0
- Injuries: 0
- Survivors: 60

LAN-Chile Flight 160 was a Boeing 727-116 on a flight from Buenos Aires, Argentina to Santiago, Chile carrying 8 crew and 52 passengers that crashed during approach to Santiago on April 28, 1969.

== Incident ==
Flight 160 took off from Ministro Pistarini International Airport at 23:56 GMT (20:56 local time), but when nearing Santiago the Boeing 727 descended below the minimum height of 2829 feet and kept on descending until it struck the ground in farmland north of Colina, Chile.

=== Survivors ===
While the aircraft was damaged beyond repair in the crash, none of the 60 passengers and crew was killed or injured.

== Cause ==
The cause of the accident was excessive concentration by the crew on the indications given by the flight director instrument, which was being incorrectly used on a direct instrument landing system (ILS) approach. The crew did not check other instruments, which showed that the aircraft was descending below its glidepath.
