= LATAM Cargo Chile =

Chilean cargo airline

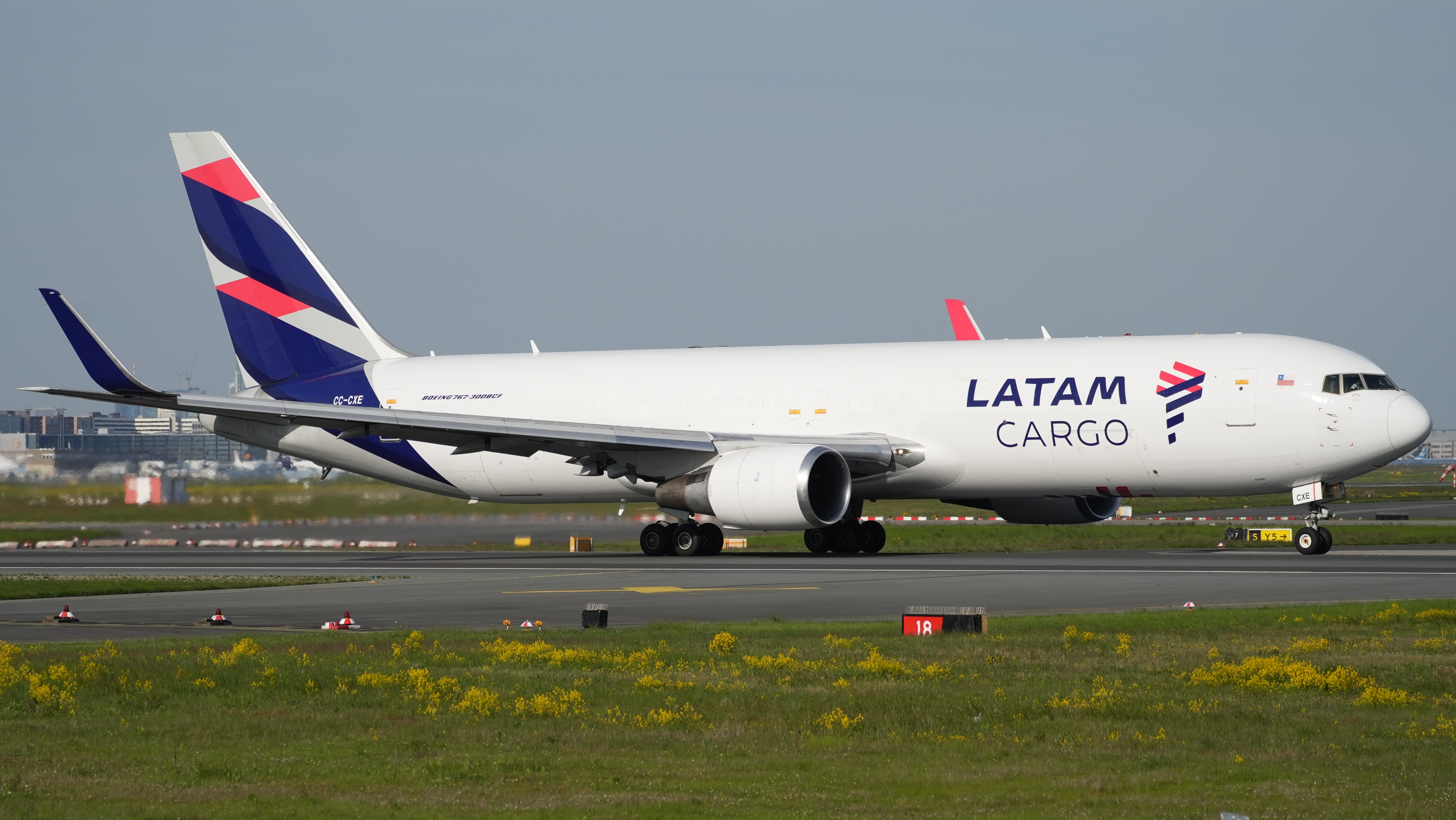
IATA	ICAO	Call sign
UC	LCO	LAN CARGO
- Founded: May 22, 1970
- Hubs: Arturo Merino Benítez International Airport; Jorge Chávez International Airport; Miami International Airport
- Fleet size: 9
- Destinations: 21
- Parent company: LATAM Airlines Group
- Headquarters: Santiago, Chile
- Key people: Andres Bianchi (CEO)
- Website: www.latamcargo.com

LATAM Cargo Chile (formerly LAN Cargo S.A.) is a cargo airline based in Santiago, Chile and the freight subsidiary of the LATAM Airlines Group. It is operating cargo flights within South America, to Europe and North America from its hubs at Miami International Airport and Arturo Merino Benítez International Airport.

It is a sister company of LATAM Cargo Brasil and LATAM Cargo Colombia.

== History ==
The airline was formed on May 22, 1970, after the cargo and passenger business of LAN-Chile was separated.

In 1998, it was based on the original cargo divisions of LAN-Chile, Ladeco, and Fast Air Carrier. It also worked closely with the other cargo airlines in the group like ABSA Cargo Airline, Florida West International Airways and Mas Air. LAN Cargo was rebranded to LATAM Cargo Chile as part of the merger of its parent LAN Airlines with TAM Linhas Aéreas to form LATAM Airlines Group during 2016.

During the global COVID-19 pandemic, the airline flew numerous additional routes on an ad-hoc basis, especially in May 2020 and after.

On 26 May 2020, LATAM filed for Chapter 11 bankruptcy in the United States due to economic problems attributed to the impact of the COVID-19 pandemic on aviation, although they are currently operating and have been negotiating terms. In August, the company announced its second-quarter results, projecting improved operational prospects.

== Destinations ==
LATAM Cargo Chile operates the following as of June 2010.

Country	City	Airport	Notes	Refs
Argentina	Buenos Aires	Ministro Pistarini International Airport		
Argentina	Tucumán	Teniente Benjamín Matienzo International Airport	Seasonal	
Belgium	Brussels	Brussels Airport		
Brazil	Campinas	Viracopos International Airport		
Brazil	Curitiba	Afonso Pena International Airport		
Brazil	Rio de Janeiro	Rio de Janeiro/Galeão International Airport		
Canada	Vancouver	Vancouver International Airport	Terminated	
Chile	Santiago	Arturo Merino Benítez International Airport	Hub	
Colombia	Bogotá	El Dorado International Airport		
Colombia	Medellín	José María Córdova International Airport		
Costa Rica	San José	Juan Santamaria International Airport		
Ecuador	Guayaquil	José Joaquín de Olmedo International Airport		
Ecuador	Quito	Mariscal Sucre International Airport		
Germany	Frankfurt	Frankfurt Airport		
Guatemala	Guatemala City	La Aurora International Airport		
Netherlands	Amsterdam	Amsterdam Airport Schiphol		
Paraguay	Asunción	Silvio Pettirossi International Airport		
Paraguay	Ciudad del Este	Guaraní International Airport		
Peru	Lima	Jorge Chávez International Airport	Hub	
Turkey	Istanbul	Istanbul Airport		
United States	Boston	Logan International Airport		
United States	Miami	Miami International Airport	Hub	
Uruguay	Montevideo	Carrasco International Airport		
Venezuela	Caracas	Simón Bolívar International Airport	Terminated	
Venezuela	Valencia	Arturo Michelena International Airport	Terminated	

== Fleet ==
=== Current fleet ===
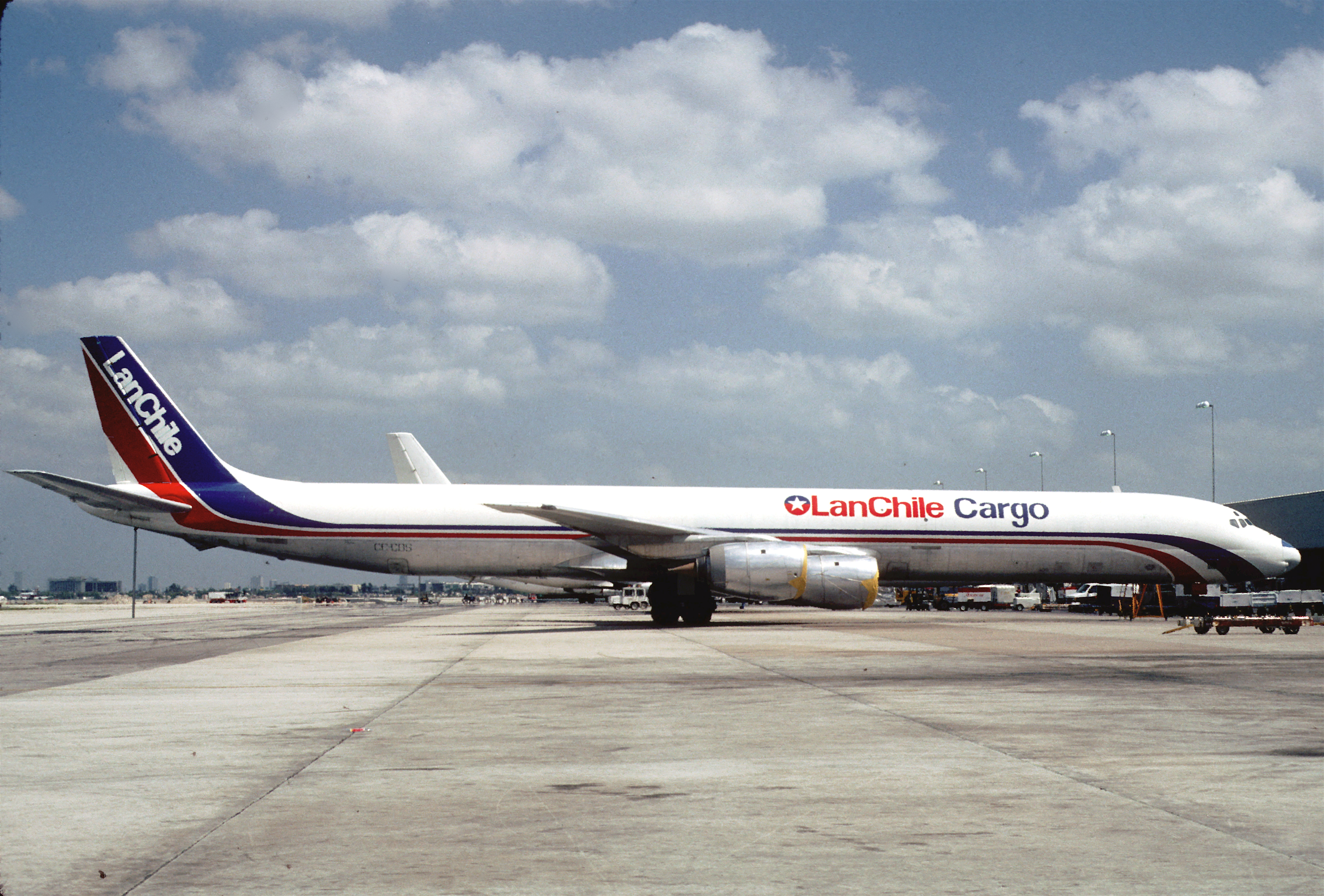
A former LAN-Chile Cargo Douglas DC-8-71F at Miami International Airport, 1995

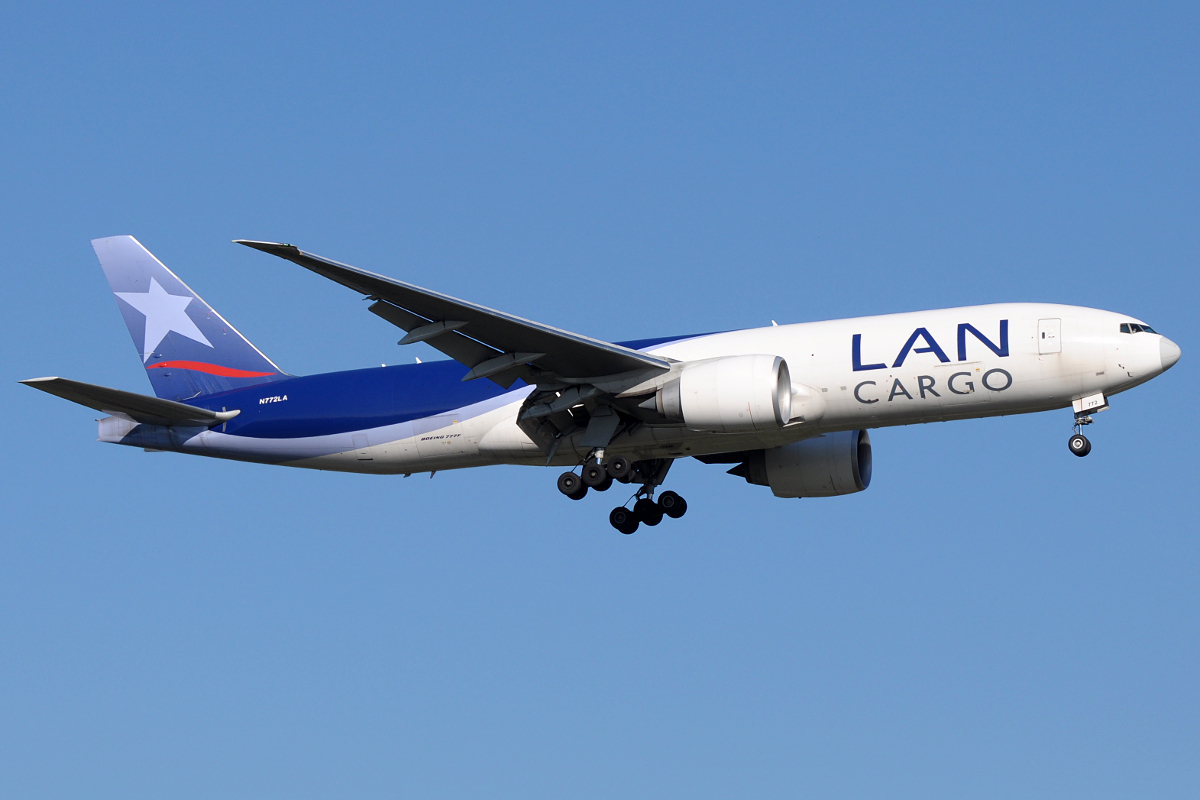
A former LAN Cargo Boeing 777F, 2010

As of August 2025, LATAM Cargo Chile operates the following aircraft:

LATAM Cargo Chile fleet
Aircraft	In service	Orders	Notes
Boeing 767-300ER/BCF	6	—	
Boeing 767-300F	3	—	
Total	9	—	

=== Former fleet ===
As LAN Cargo, the airline previously operated the following aircraft:

Aircraft	Total	Introduced	Retired	Notes
Boeing 707-320C	4	Unknown	1994	
Boeing 737-200F	1	2004	2008	
Boeing 777F	3	2009	2017	Transferred to AeroLogic
Douglas DC-8-71F	3	1992	2000	

== See also ==
- LATAM Chile
- List of airlines of Chile
