= National Airlines (Chile) =

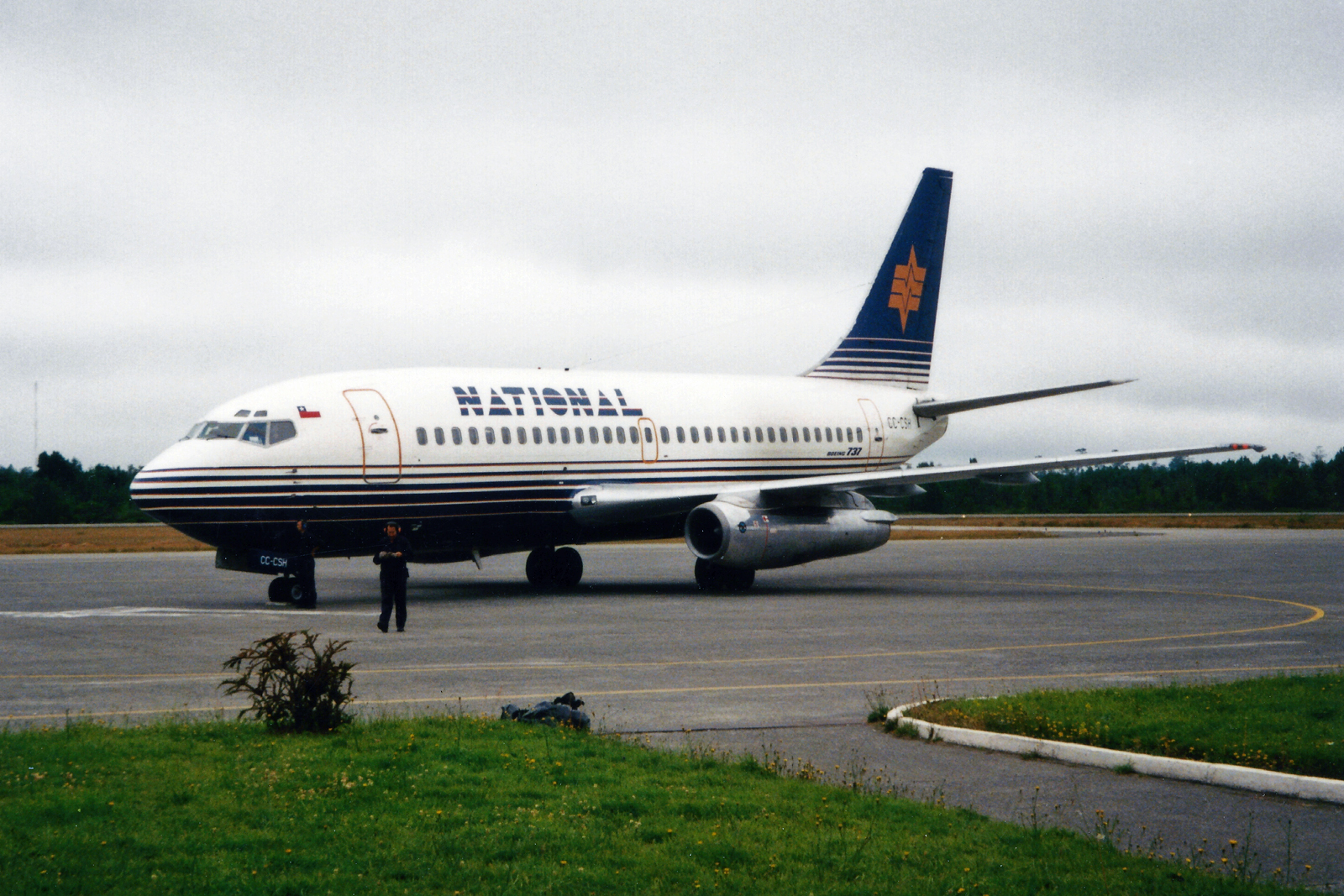
IATA	ICAO	Call sign
N4	NCN	NATIONAL
- Founded: 1992
- Commenced operations: December 27, 1992
- Ceased operations: January 8, 1998
- Headquarters: Huerfanos 725, Piso 3, Santiago de Chile

National Airlines was a Chilean airline based in Santiago, Chile which operated from 1992 to 1988.

== History ==
National Airlines was founded by a group of investors led by Miguel Nasur. It began operations on December 27, 1992, acquiring Southwest Pacific, owned by Edmundo Ziede, a businessman from Antofagasta. Southwest Pacific offered flights from Santiago to Arica, Iquique, and Antofagasta. The founders' vision, which included acquiring two Boeing 737-200 aircraft from the British airline Britannia, allowed for a rapid expansion of operations to the cities of Puerto Montt and Punta Arenas. Its slogan was "National, shortening the distances." Its first international flight was held on September 9, 1995, with the route from Santiago to Mendoza.

In August of the following year, it began flights to the cities of Balmaceda and Calamay. That same year, it signed an agreement with the Argentine flag carrier Aerolíneas Argentinas who would handle the maintenance of its Boeing 737 fleet. On August 15, 1997, National Airlines began flights to Buenos Aires. In September, it inaugurated its routes to the United States, after the Chilean flag carrier had transferred some of its routes to it the previous year. In late 1997, the magazine companies Air International and Aircraft magazines reported that National Airlines was evaluating wide-body aircraft, with the Boeing 767 and McDonnell Douglas DC-10 being the leading options, for potential service to Europe. This however never materialized. On January 8, 1998, another Chilean airline called Avant Airlines acquired 100% of National, with all of the airline's operations gradually passing into Avant Airlines, which operated up until 2001.

== Destinations ==
Países	Destinos	Aeropuertos
Argentina	Buenos Aires	Aeropuerto Internacional Ministro Pistarini
Argentina	Mendoza	Aeropuerto Internacional Gobernador Francisco Gabrielli
Bolivia	La Paz	Aeropuerto Internacional El Alto
Chile	Antofagasta	Aeropuerto Andrés Sabella
Chile	Arica	Aeropuerto Internacional Chacalluta
Chile	Balmaceda	Aeródromo Balmaceda
Chile	Calama	Aeropuerto El Loa
Chile	Concepción	Aeropuerto Internacional Carriel Sur
Chile	Iquique	Aeropuerto Internacional Diego Aracena
Chile	La Serena	Aeródromo La Florida
Chile	Santiago de Chile	Aeropuerto Internacional Arturo Merino Benítez
Chile	Temuco	Aeródromo Maquehue
Chile	Puerto Montt	Aeropuerto Internacional El Tepual
Chile	Punta Arenas	Aeropuerto Internacional Presidente Carlos Ibáñez del Campo
Ecuador	Guayaquil	Aeropuerto Internacional José Joaquín de Olmedo
United States	New York	John F Kennedy International Airport
Paraguay	Asunción	Aeropuerto Internacional Silvio Pettirossi
Peru	Arequipa	Aeropuerto Internacional Rodríguez Ballón

== Fleet ==
National Airlines operated the following aircraft throughout its existence

Plane	Total	Introduced	Left fleet
Boeing 727-200	2	1996	1998
Boeing 737-200	6	1992	1998
