= Marcel Marchant Airport =

Airport in Puerto Montt, Chile

Marcel Marchant Airport La Paloma Airport
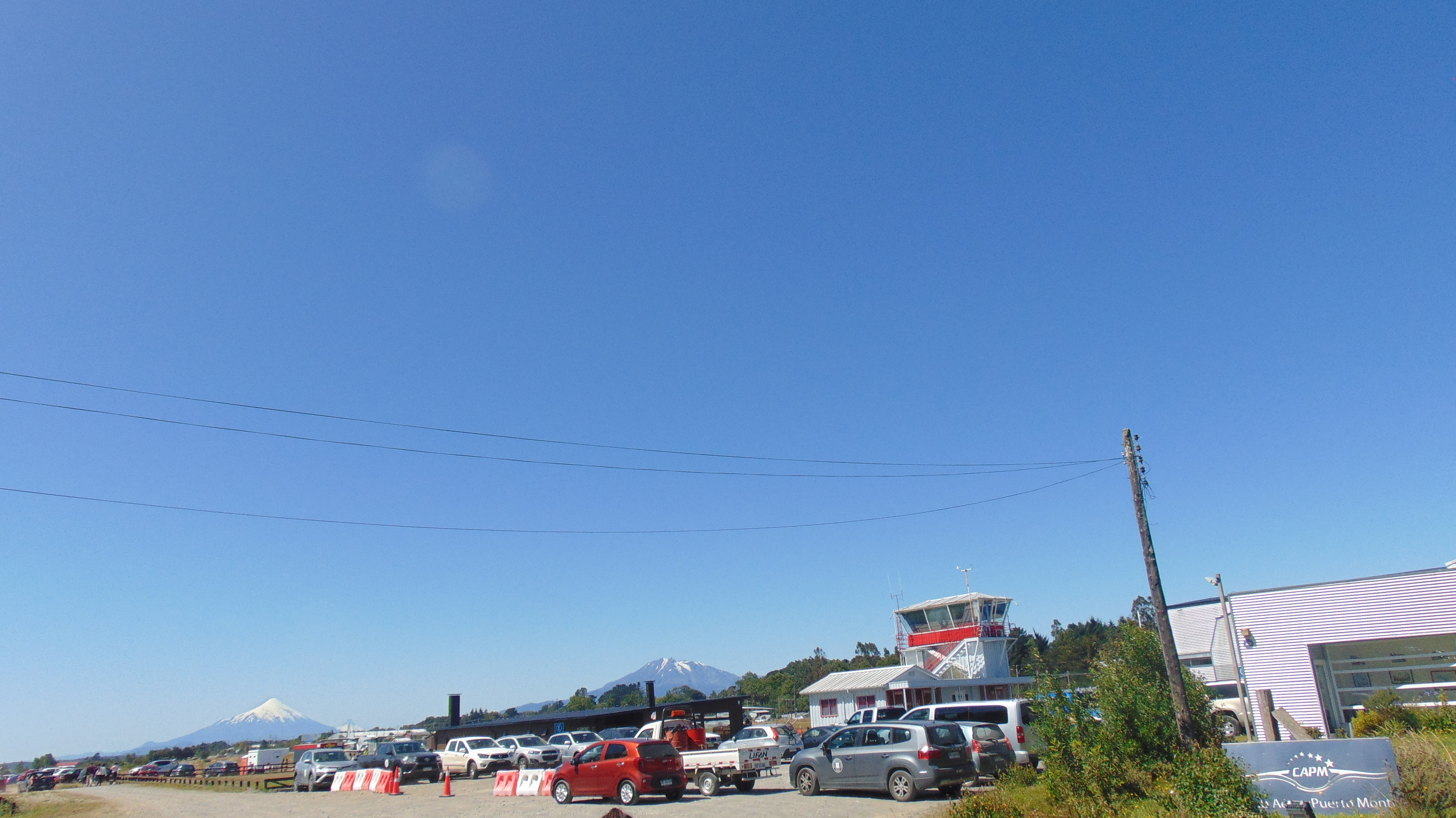
- IATA: none; ICAO: SCPF

Summary
- Airport type: Public
- Serves: Puerto Montt, Chile
- Elevation AMSL: 367 ft / 112 m
- Coordinates: 41°27′15″S 72°55′03″W

Map
- Location of Marcel Marchant Airport in Chile

Runways
| Direction | Length | | Surface |
| Direction | m | ft | Surface |
|---|---|---|---|
| 01/19 | 1,005 | 3,297 | Asphalt |
- Source: Landings.com Google Maps GCM

Marcel Marchant Airport (Spanish: Aeropuerto Marcel Marchant), (ICAO: SCPF) is an airport in the northeast section of Puerto Montt, a port city in the Los Lagos Region of Chile.

The runway is 2 kilometres (1.2 mi) inland from the Reloncaví Sound, and south approaches and departures are partially over the water. The Puerto Montt VOR-DME (Ident: MON) is located 8.0 nautical miles (14.8 km) west of the airport.

Marcel Marchant Airport serves as a hub for Aerocord and Pewen, two small regional airlines with daily flights to Northern Chilean Patagonia. Both airlines offer regular daily flights to Chaiten and Melinka, as well as charters to Futaleufú, Palena, and La Junta.

== See also ==
- Transport in Chile
- List of airports in Chile
