= Air Comet Chile =

Chilean airline

Air Comet
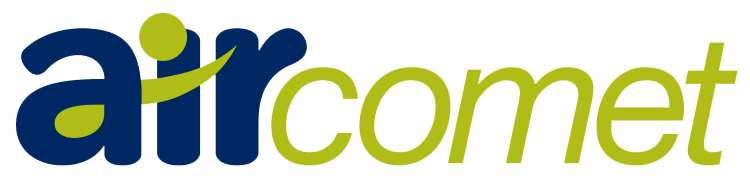
IATA	ICAO	Call sign
3L	DLU	DEL SUR
- Founded: 2004 (as Aerolíneas del Sur)
- Commenced operations: December 6, 2004
- Ceased operations: October 31, 2008
- Operating bases: Arturo Merino Benítez International Airport
- Frequent-flyer program: Club Air Comet
- Fleet size: 5
- Destinations: 3
- Parent company: Air Comet
- Headquarters: Santiago, Chile
- Website: aircomet.cl

Air Comet Chile was an airline based in Santiago, Chile, operating domestic passenger services. Its main base was Arturo Merino Benítez International Airport, Santiago.

== History ==
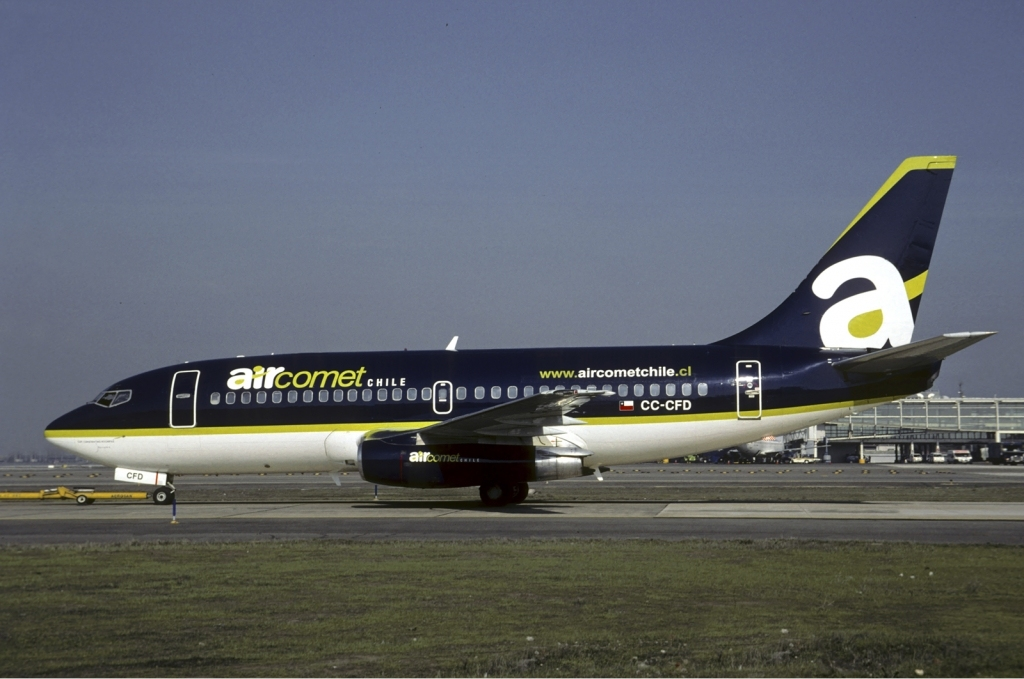
Air Comet Chile Boeing 737-200

The airline was founded as Aerolíneas del Sur in 2004 by Grupo Marsans and started operations on December 6, 2004, after receiving approval from the Chilean civil aviation authorities in November 2004. On December 1, 2007, it was renamed Air Comet Chile, acting as the sister airline of the Spanish airline Air Comet. It was at that time Chile's third biggest airline.

The airline ceased operation on October 31, 2008, and filed for bankruptcy protection on December 18, 2008. Some of their aircraft were taken by PAL Airlines.

== Destinations ==
Air Comet Chile operated services from Santiago to the following domestic destinations (as of October 2008):

Chile

- Puerto Montt - El Tepual International Airport
- Punta Arenas - Presidente Carlos Ibáñez del Campo International Airport
- Santiago - Arturo Merino Benítez International Airport base

== Fleet ==
The Air Comet Chile fleet consisted of the following aircraft:

Air Comet Chile fleet
Aircraft	Total	Introduced	Retired	Notes
Boeing 737-200	5	2004	2008	
