= El Loa Airport =

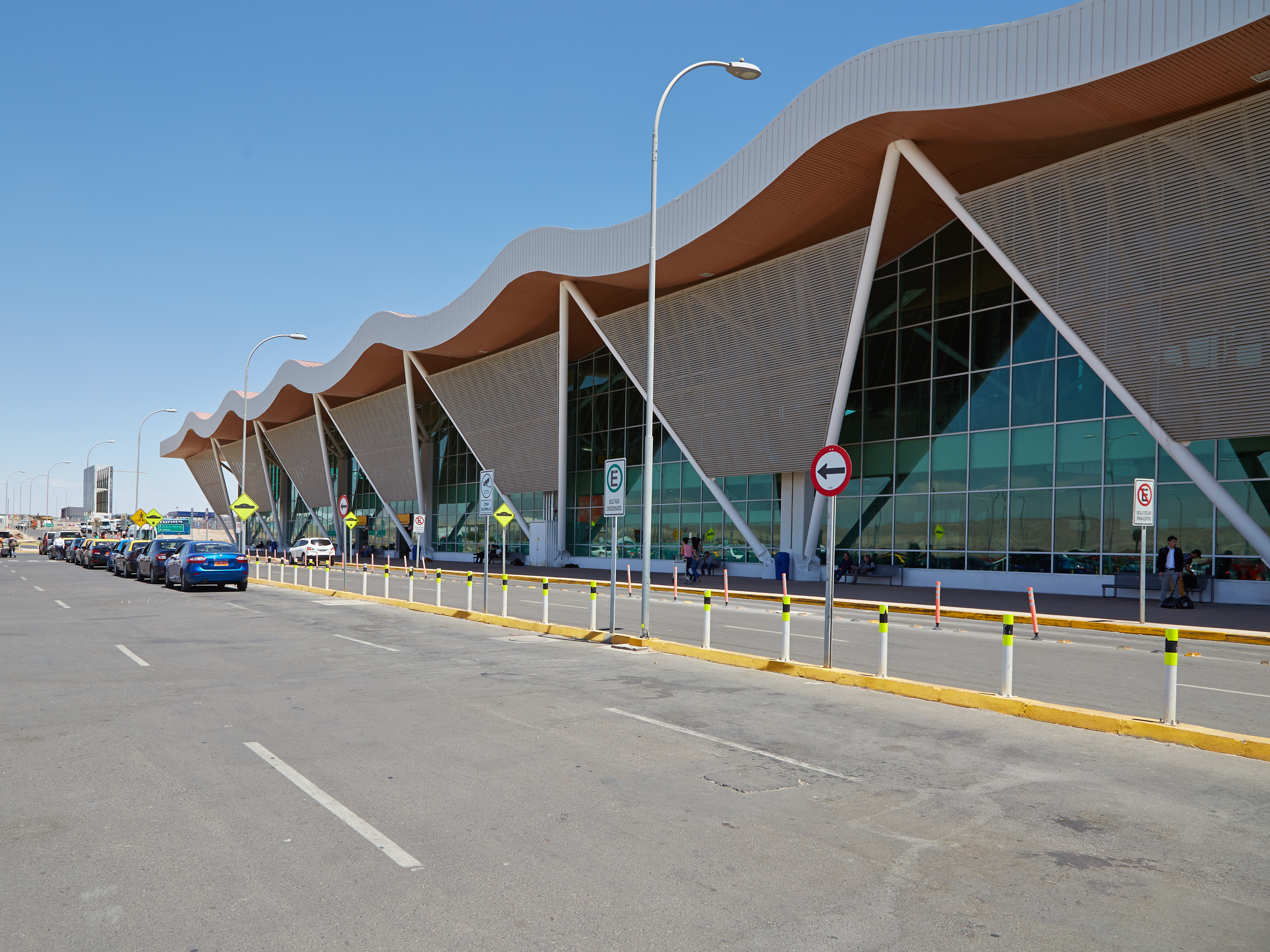
- IATA: CJC; ICAO: SCCF

Summary
- Airport type: Public
- Owner: Dirección de Aeronautica Civil de Chile (DGAC)
- Operator: Sociedad Concesionaria El Loa S.A
- Serves: Calama, Chile
- Elevation AMSL: 7,631 ft (2,326 m)
- Coordinates: 22°29′50″S 68°54′25″W
- Website: Website in DGAC

Map
- Location of airport in Chile

Runways
Direction	Length		Surface
Direction	m	ft	Surface
10/28	3,040	9,974	Asphalt

Statistics (2006)
- Passengers: 315,725
- Sources: Landings.com

El Loa Airport (Spanish: Aeropuerto El Loa) (IATA: CJC, ICAO: SCCF) is the major airport serving Calama, a city in the Antofagasta Region of Chile. It is one of the largest airports in Chile.

The airport is 6 kilometres (3.7 mi) from the city centre. It currently accommodates aircraft with a maximum wingspan of 36 metres (118 ft), so it is limited to narrow-body airliners like the Airbus A320 or Boeing 737. There are plans to construct a second runway with capacity to accommodate wide body jets and military aircraft.

Previously, it was an international airport and served international flights to Lima, Peru, operated by LATAM Peru, but this was suspended in March 2020 due to the pandemic.

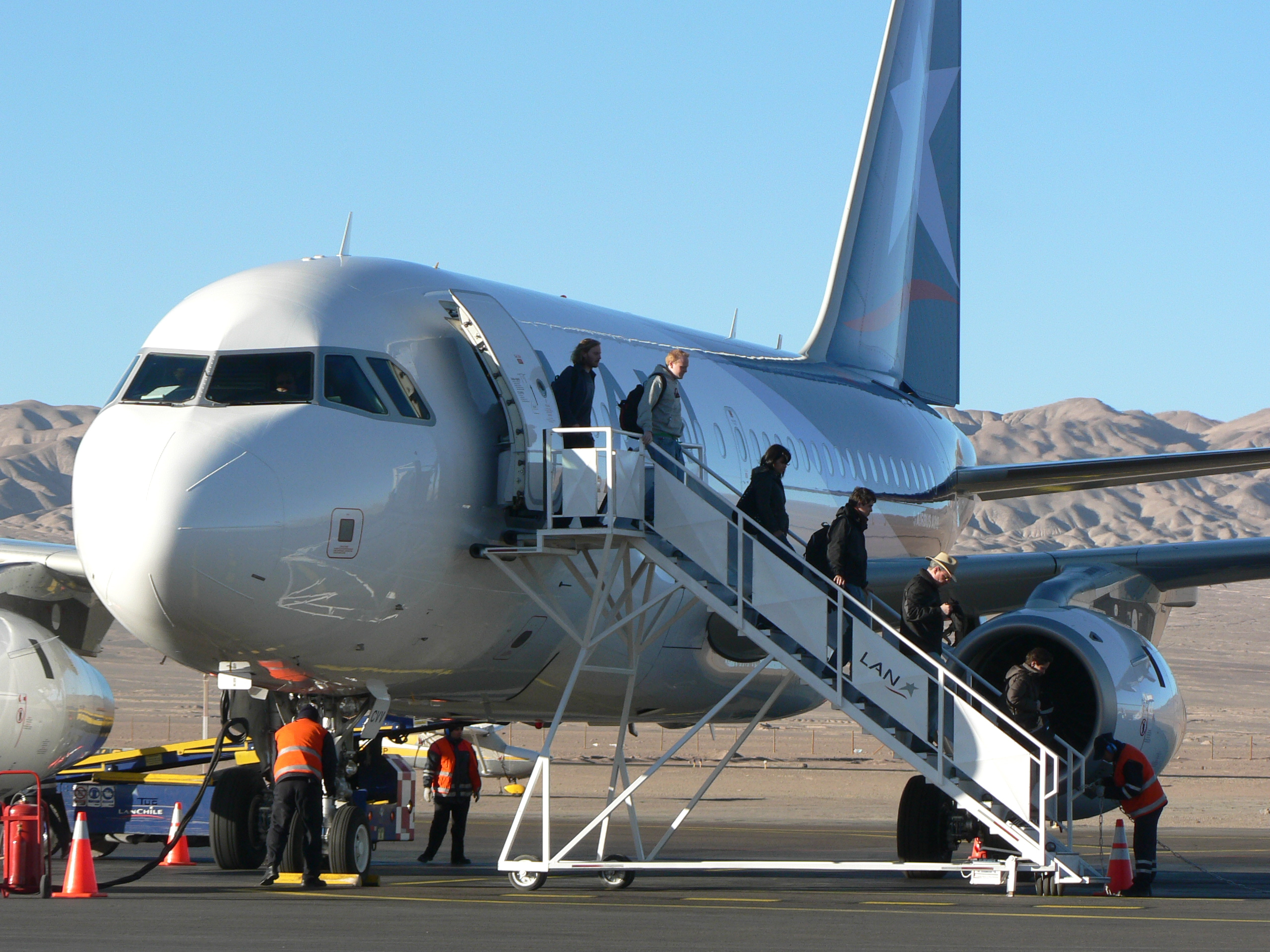
Passengers disembarking a flight from Santiago in 2008

== Facilities ==
=== Passenger terminal ===
A new passenger terminal was inaugurated in 2014. It includes three air bridges, an expanded apron, and 12 commercial locations. In addition, there was extensive landscaping around the terminal and a new car park was built.

=== Other facilities ===
In parallel to the development of the new terminal, a new 28-metre (92 ft) high control tower, fire brigade service centre, Air Club Hangar, and wastewater treatment plant were opened.

== Airlines and destinations ==
Airlines	Destinations
JetSmart Chile	Concepción, La Serena, Santiago de Chile
LATAM Chile	La Serena, Santiago de Chile; Seasonal: Concepción
Sky Airline	La Serena, Santiago de Chile

== See also ==
- Transport in Chile
- List of airports in Chile
