= LATAM Airlines =

Latin American airline holding company

LATAM Airlines Group S.A.

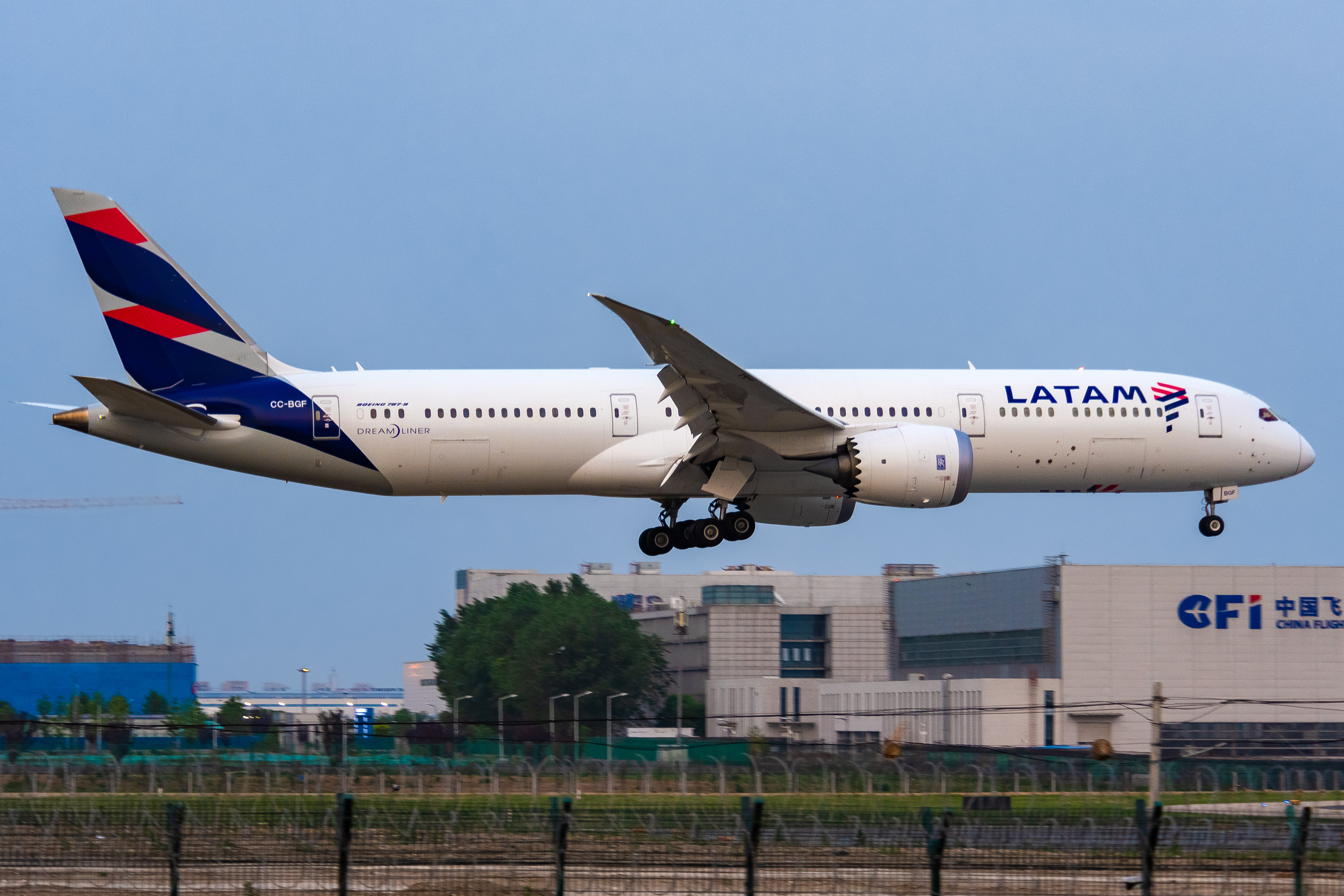
- Founded: 22 June 2012; 14 years ago
- Subsidiaries: LATAM Chile; LATAM Brasil; LATAM Colombia; LATAM Ecuador; LATAM Paraguay; LATAM Perú; LATAM Cargo Chile; LATAM Cargo Brasil; LATAM Cargo Colombia
- Fleet size: 368
- Destinations: 166
- Traded as: BCS: LTM; NYSE: LTM
- Headquarters: Santiago, Chile
- Key people: Ignacio Cueto (Chairman); Roberto Alvo (CEO)
- Revenue: ▲US$13.034 billion (2024)
- Operating income: ▲US$1.660 billion (2024)
- Net income: ▲US$0.977 billion (2024)
- Total assets: ▲US$15.850 billion (2024)
- Employees: 35,568 (2023)
- Website: www.latamairlinesgroup.net

LATAM Airlines is a Chilean multinational airline headquartered in Santiago, Chile. It is the largest airline holding company in Latin America with subsidiaries in Brazil, Colombia, Ecuador, Paraguay and Peru.

Although LATAM Airlines' headquarters are located in Chile, the carrier is an American depositary receipt and is traded on both the Santiago Stock Exchange and New York Stock Exchange. The company filed for Chapter 11 bankruptcy in the United States on 26 May 2020, due to economic problems attributed to the impact of the COVID-19 pandemic on aviation, and later emerged from bankruptcy proceedings in 2022.

== History ==
=== Merger ===
Chile's LAN-Chile and Brazil's TAM Linhas Aéreas signed a non-binding agreement to merge on 13 August 2010, followed by a binding agreement on 19 January 2011, and papers to close the merger on 22 June 2012, with TAM Linhas Aéreas' shareholders agreeing to the takeover by LAN Airlines. Enrique Cueto, former CEO of LAN, became the CEO of LATAM; LATAM now has been reworked into being a portmanteau word of "Latin" and "America". Mauricio Rolim Amaro, formerly vice-chairman of TAM, became LATAM chairman.

=== Government approvals ===
The agreement to establish LATAM was approved by Chilean authorities on 21 September 2011, with 11 restrictions. These included transferring four landing slots at São Paulo–Guarulhos International Airport to competitors interested in operating flights to Santiago de Chile's Arturo Merino Benítez International Airport, renouncing membership to either the Oneworld or Star Alliance airline alliance, restricting the increase in capacity on flights between Brazil and Chile, and opening code-share possibilities and fidelity program membership to interested competitors. On 14 December 2011, Brazilian authorities approved the agreement, imposing similar restrictions as Chilean authorities: LATAM would have to choose an alliance by August 2012 and frequencies between São Paulo and Santiago de Chile would have to be reduced. At the time, TAM had two pairs of slots while LAN had four. LAN had to relinquish two pairs to competitors interested in using them. On 7 March 2013, LATAM announced its final decision to choose Oneworld as its global airline alliance. As a result, TAM left Star Alliance during the second quarter of 2014 to join Oneworld.

=== Rebranding ===
In August 2015, it was announced that all LATAM Airlines Group airlines would fully rebrand as LATAM, with one unified livery to be applied on all aircraft by 2018. The rebranding included all aspects of the business, such as staff uniforms and airport check in facilities. The first of the aircraft were repainted (or delivered new) in the new LATAM livery in April 2016.

=== Delta stake and Oneworld departure ===
On 26 September 2019, Delta Air Lines announced its plans to buy 20% of LATAM for $1.9 billion, to expand Delta's access to the Latin American market. Additionally, Delta agreed to pay LATAM's exit fee from Oneworld and to take delivery of all Airbus A350 XWB aircraft that LATAM had on order. On 1 January 2020, it was reported that Delta Air Lines' acquisition of the 20% stake in the LATAM group was completed. Group CEO Enrique Cueto stepped down on 31 March 2020, and was succeeded by Roberto Alvo, the group's then-current Chief Commercial Officer. On 31 January 2020, LATAM announced that it would leave Oneworld three months later on 1 May.

=== COVID-19 related bankruptcy ===
On 26 May 2020, LATAM filed for Chapter 11 bankruptcy in the United States due to economic problems attributed to the impact of the COVID-19 pandemic on aviation, although they continued to operate while negotiating terms. In response to the bankruptcy filing, the company's stock ticker (LTM) was delisted from the New York Stock Exchange on 9 June 2020 and moved to the unregulated OTC Markets Pink on 12 June 2020 using the stock ticker LTMAQ. To assist with the COVID-19 pandemic in Peru, the company announced that its subsidiary LATAM Perú would help distribute vaccines to fifteen provinces in Peru for free.

=== Bankruptcy recovery ===
LATAM emerged from bankruptcy proceedings in 2022, coupled with a restructuring of the company. And on 24 July 2024, the company's LTM stock ticker was relisted on the New York Stock Exchange.

== Corporate affairs ==
=== Business trends ===
The key trends for the LATAM Group are (as of the financial year ending 31 December):

	Revenue (US$ m)	Net profit (US$ m)	Number of employees	Number of passengers (m)	Passenger load factor (%)	Number of served countries (Note: passenger operations)	Number of destinations	Fleet size	Cargo carried (000 tons)	References
2012	9,722	24.3	53,599	64.9	78.6		140	327	1,200	
2013	13,266	−281	52,997	66.6	80.8		145	339	1,171	
2014	12,471	−109	53,072	67.8	83.4		155	327	1,102	
2015	10,125	−219	50,413	67.8	83.1	25	150	331	1,009	
2016	9,527	69.2	45,916	66.9	84.2	25	145	332	944	
2017	10,163	155	43,095	67.0	84.8	24	140	315	896	
2018	10,368	181	41,170	68.8	83.1	26	135	320	921	
2019	10,430	190	41,729	74.2	83.5	26	125	342	903	
2020	4,334	−4,545	28,396	28.3	76.5	21	100	300	785	
2021	5,111	−4,647	29,114	40.2	74.4	18	110	310	801	
2022	9,516	1,339	32,507	62.0	81.3	22	120	310	901	
2023	11,789	582	35,568	74.0	83.1	26	130	333	946	

=== Ownership ===
As of 31 July 2025, the company's major shareholders are:

Shareholder	Interest
(United States) Sixth Street Partners	20.1%
(United States) Strategic Value Partners	11.5%
(United States) Delta Air Lines	10.0%
Qatar Airways	10.0%
(Chile) Cueto Group	5.0%
Other investors	38.3%
	100%

== Operations ==
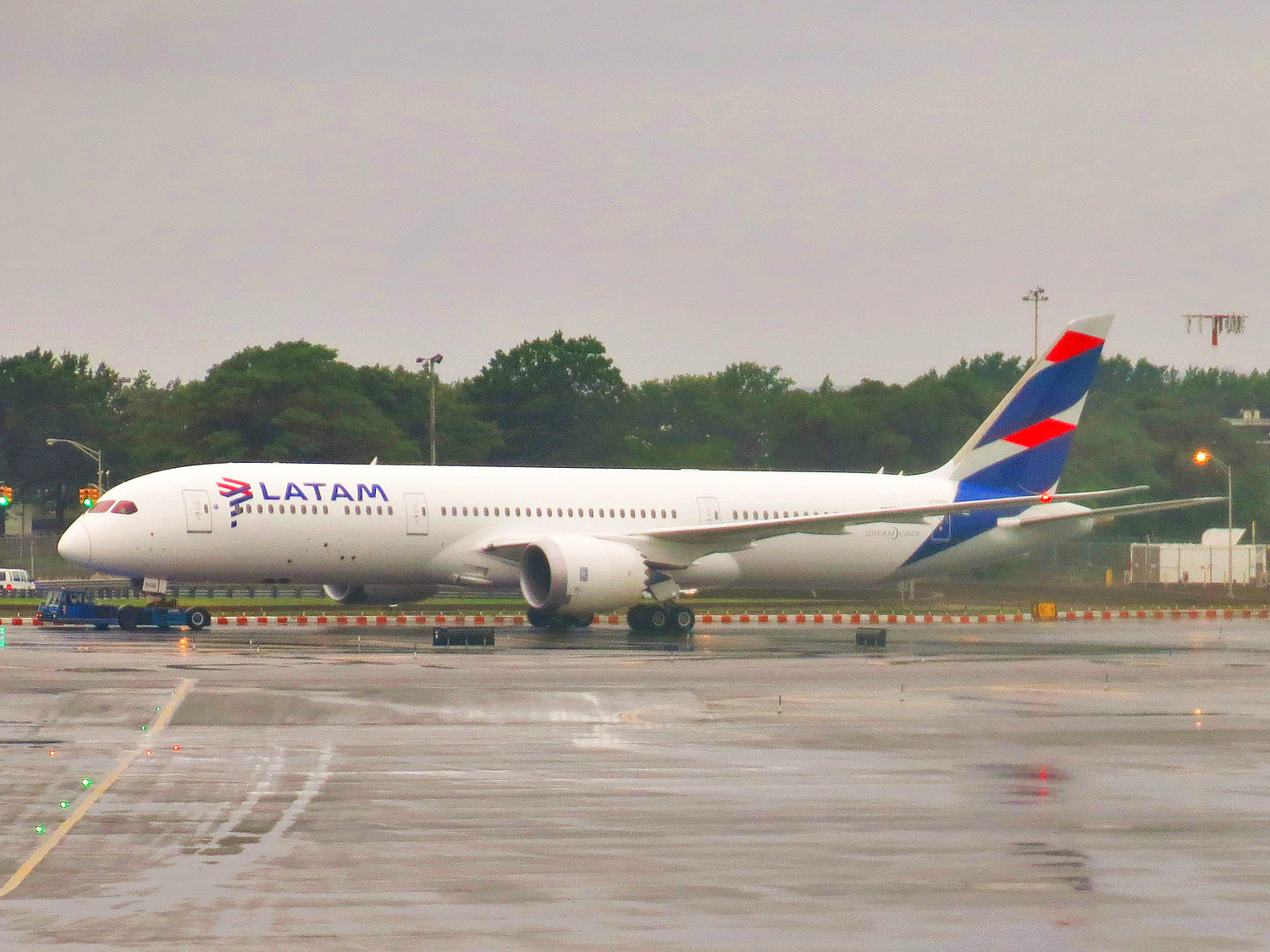
A LATAM Chile Boeing 787-9 Dreamliner at John F. Kennedy International Airport in July 2016.

As of 31 December 2017, LATAM Airlines Group is one of the largest airline groups in the world in terms of network connections, with its subsidiaries operating a combined fleet of 315 aircraft providing passenger transport services to 137 destinations in 24 countries; and 18 aircraft providing cargo services to 144 destinations in 29 countries.

LATAM's main hubs are Santiago de Chile's Arturo Merino Benítez International Airport; Jorge Chávez International Airport in Lima; São Paulo–Guarulhos International Airport; and El Dorado International Airport in Bogotá. The company is exploring the creation of a new hub in northeastern Brazil with the objective of expanding operations between Europe and South America. Bogotá is the hub for the Caribbean.

=== Subsidiaries ===
==== Current ====
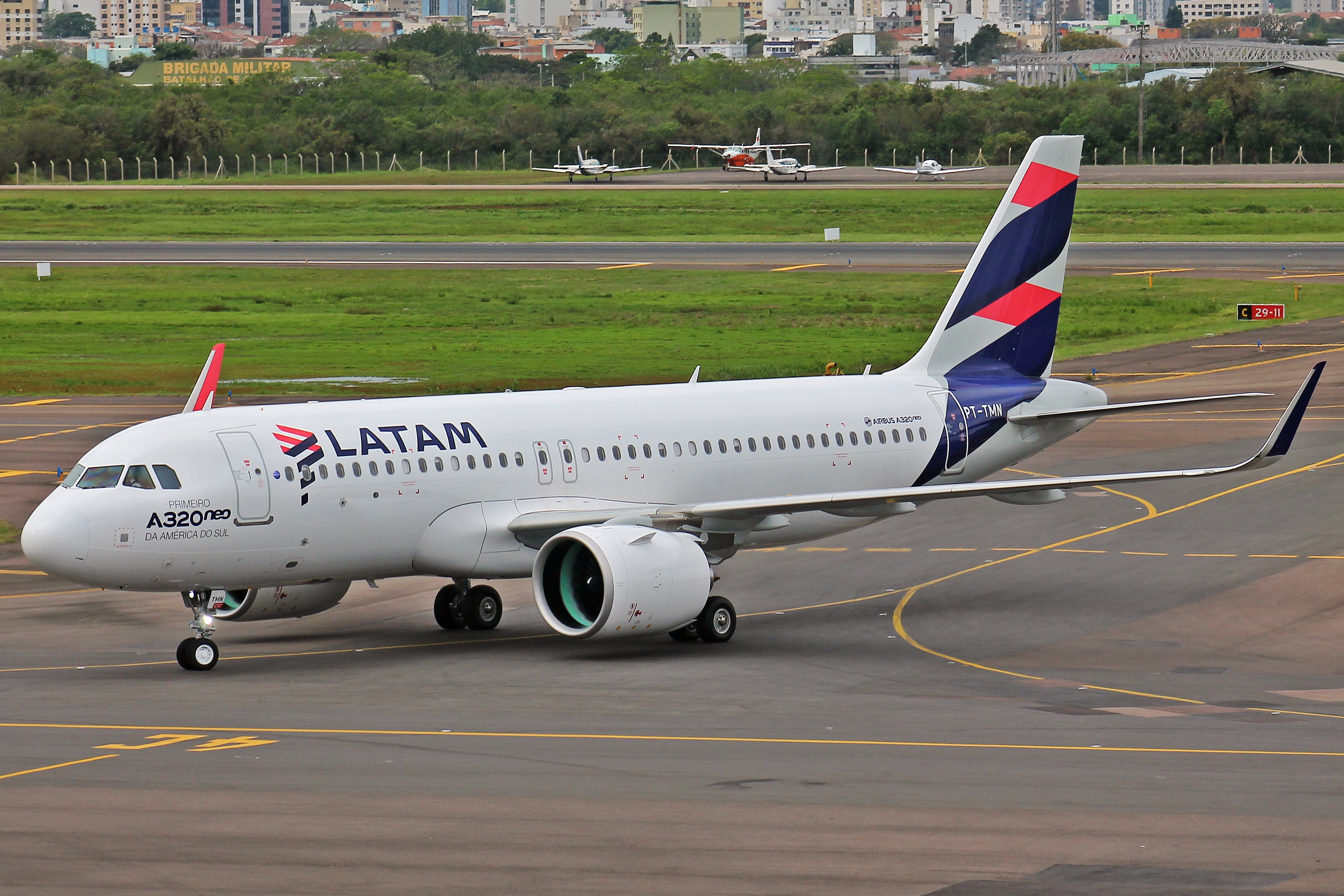
A LATAM Brasil Airbus A320neo at Salgado Filho International Airport in 2016.

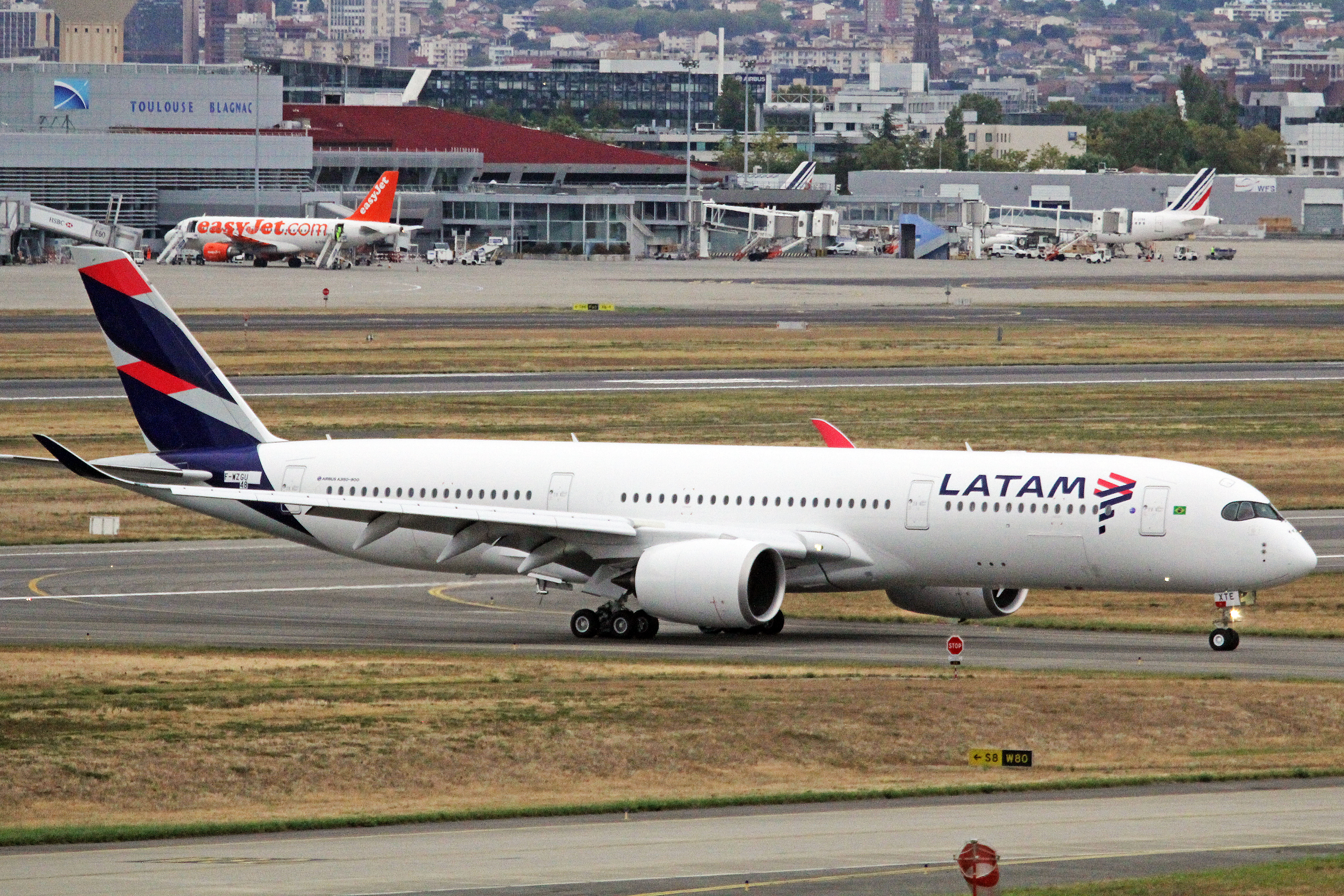
A LATAM Brasil Airbus A350-900 at Toulouse Blagnac International Airport in 2016. This aircraft, along with all other A350s in LATAM Brasil's fleet, have since been phased out and fly for other airlines nowadays, mostly Delta and Edelweiss Air.

The airlines majority- and minority-owned by LATAM Airlines Group through the primary airlines' various subsidiaries are as follows:

- LATAM Airlines Brasil
- LATAM Airlines Chile
- LATAM Airlines Colombia
- LATAM Airlines Ecuador
- LATAM Airlines Paraguay
- LATAM Airlines Perú

==== Former ====
- LATAM Airlines Argentina — ceased operations in 2020.
- LATAM Cargo Mexico — sold its shares in 2018, renamed back to MasAir.

=== Codeshare agreements ===
LATAM codeshares with the following airlines:

- Aerolíneas Argentinas
- Aeroméxico
- Air China
- Airlink
- British Airways
- Cathay Pacific
- Delta Air Lines
- China Eastern Airlines
- Finnair
- Iberia
- Japan Airlines
- Jetstar
- Korean Air
- Qantas
- Qatar Airways
- WestJet

=== Interline agreements ===
LATAM interlines with the following airlines:

- Alaska Airlines
- Singapore Airlines

=== Lounges ===
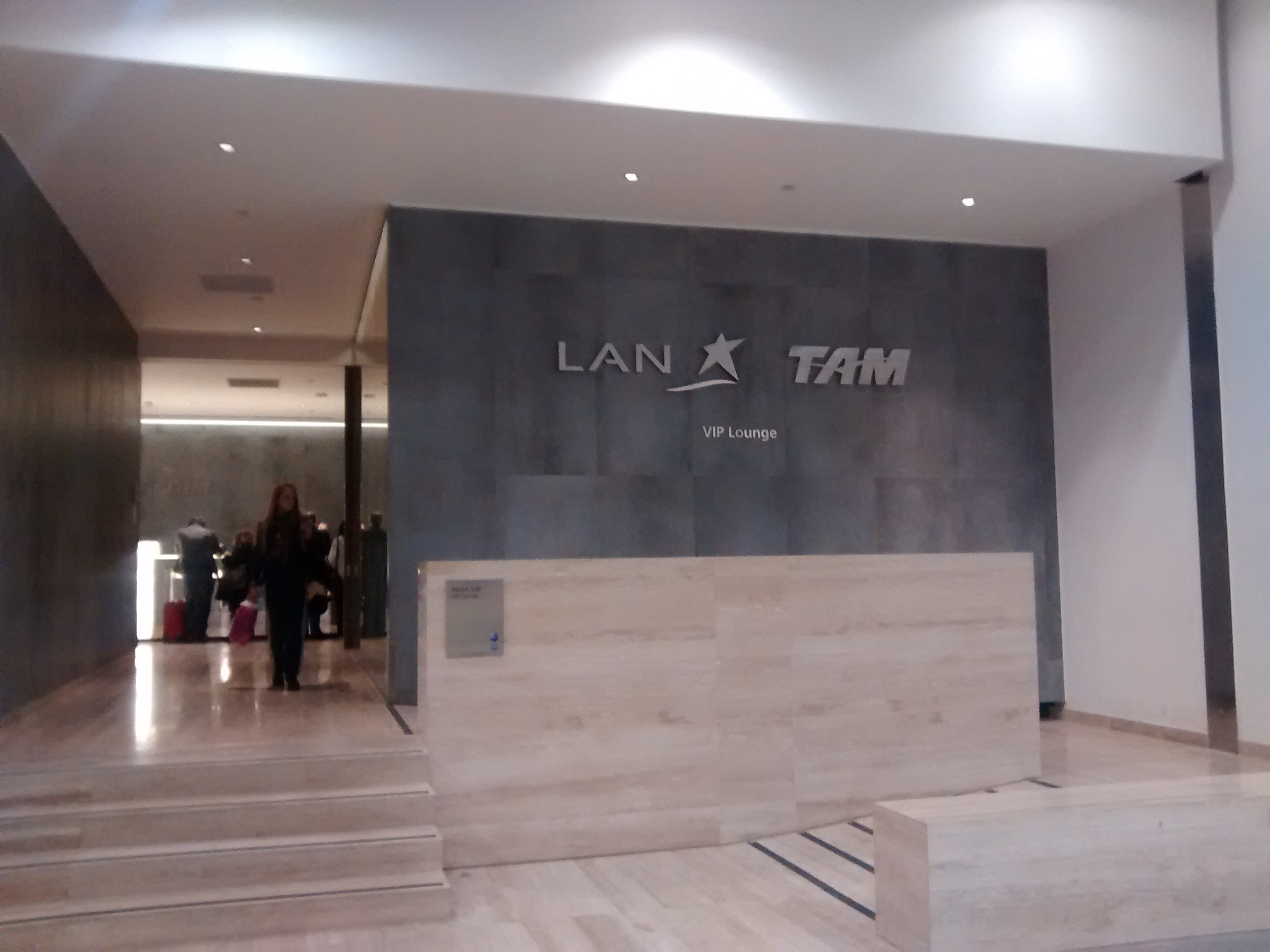
LATAM lounge in Santiago promoting the LAN-TAM merger

LATAM Airlines operates lounges at the following airports:

- Mistral Lounge at Arturo Merino Benítez International Airport, in Santiago, Chile
- Neruda Lounge at Arturo Merino Benítez International Airport, in Santiago, Chile
- Ezeiza International Airport, in Buenos Aires, Argentina
- El Dorado International Airport, in Bogotá, Colombia
- Miami International Airport
- São Paulo–Guarulhos International Airport
- Jorge Chávez International Airport, in Lima, Peru

These lounges are accessible for passengers traveling in Premium Business, Business, and Premium Economy, as well as selected members of the LATAM Pass program who are Black or Platinum members.

The newly renovated LATAM lounges were designed by Chilean architects Mathias Klotz and Olivia Putman.

=== LATAM Pass ===
LATAM Pass is the airline's frequent flyer program to reward customer loyalty. There are currently over four million members. Members earn miles every time they fly with LATAM Chile, an affiliated airline, or by using the services of any LATAM Pass-associated business around the world.

The LATAM Pass program has five membership categories:

- Gold
- Gold Plus
- Platinum
- Black
- Black Signature

== Fleet ==
As of February 2026, LATAM Airlines Group owns and operates the following aircraft:

LATAM Airlines Group fleet
Aircraft	In service	Orders	Passengers				Notes
Aircraft	In service	Orders	J	W	Y	Total	Notes
Airbus A319-100	39	—	–	–	144	144	
Airbus A320-200	135	—	–	–	168	168	Equipped with both CFM56 and IAE V2500 engines. This is due to the merger between TAM (IAE) and LAN (CFM).
Airbus A320-200	135	—	–	–	174	174	Equipped with both CFM56 and IAE V2500 engines. This is due to the merger between TAM (IAE) and LAN (CFM).
Airbus A320-200	135	—	–	–	180	180	Equipped with both CFM56 and IAE V2500 engines. This is due to the merger between TAM (IAE) and LAN (CFM).
Airbus A320-200	135	—	–	–	188	188	Former Viva Air Colombia aircraft.
Airbus A320neo	51	26	–	–	180	180	
Airbus A320neo	51	26	–	–	174	174	
Airbus A321-200	49	—	–	–	220	220	
Airbus A321-200	49	—	–	–	224	224	
Airbus A321neo	17	48	–	–	224	224	Deliveries commenced in October 2023.
Airbus A321XLR	—	13	TBA				
Boeing 767-300ER	9	—	20	–	211	231	
Boeing 767-300ER	9	—	20	–	213	233	
Boeing 767-300ER	9	—	20	–	218	238	
Boeing 777-300ER	10	—	38	50	322	410	LATAM Brasil flights only.
Boeing 787-8	10	—	20	–	252	272	
Boeing 787-8	10	—	30	–	217	247	
Boeing 787-9	28	19	30	–	283	313	With 5 options. Deliveries until 2030.
Boeing 787-9	28	19	30	57	216	303	With 5 options. Deliveries until 2030.
Embraer 195-E2	—	24	TBA				Order with 50 options. Deliveries begin 2026.
LATAM Cargo fleet
Boeing 767-300F	7	—	Cargo				
Boeing 767-300ER/BCF	13	—	Cargo				
Total	368	135					

== See also ==
- List of airline holding companies
