= List of cargo airlines =

This is a list of notable cargo airlines organized by home country.

== Africa ==
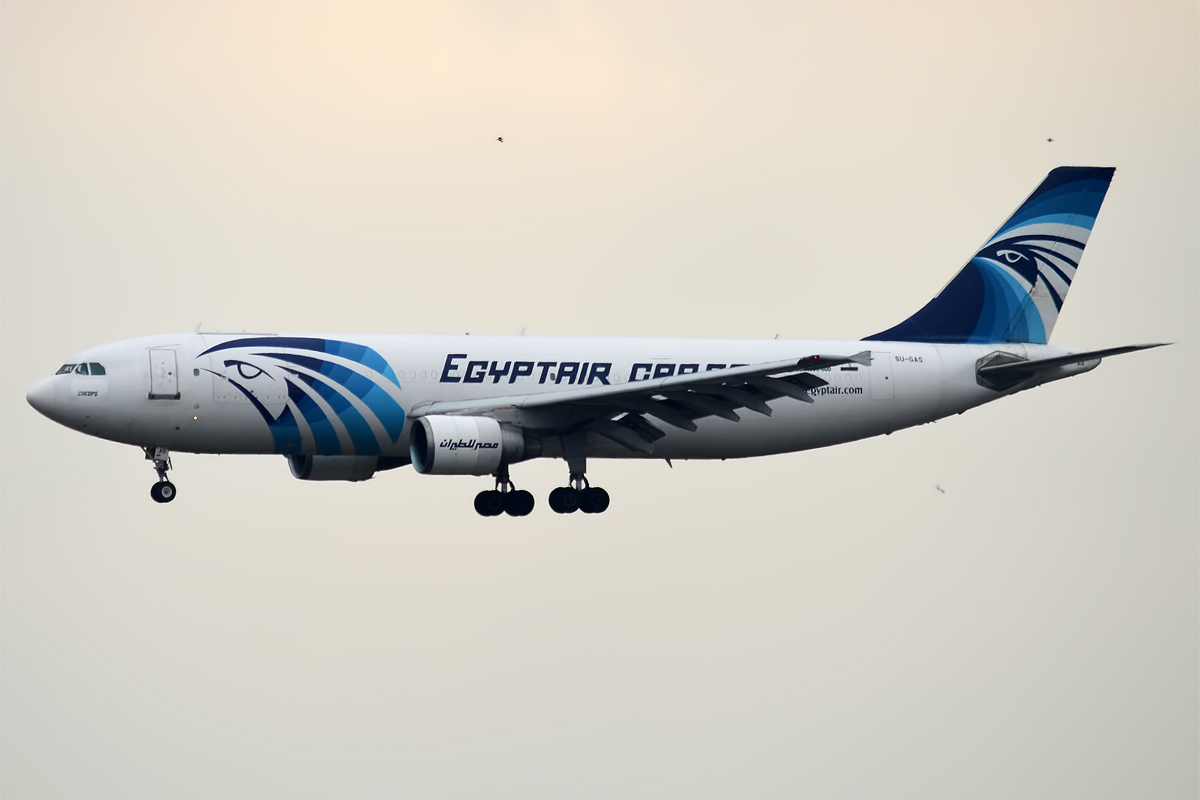
A300B4-622R(F) of Egyptair Cargo

Kenya

- Kenya Airways Cargo
- Astral Aviation ltd

Democratic Republic of the Congo

- Trans Air Cargo Service

Egypt

- Egyptair Cargo

Ethiopia

- Ethiopian Cargo

Ghana

- Aerogem Aviation

Ivory Coast

- Ivoirienne de Transports Aériens

Morocco

- Med Airlines
- RAM Cargo

Nigeria

- Allied Air

South Africa

- Express Air Cargo
- Solenta Aviation
- Star Air Cargo

Tunisia

- Express Air Cargo

== North America ==
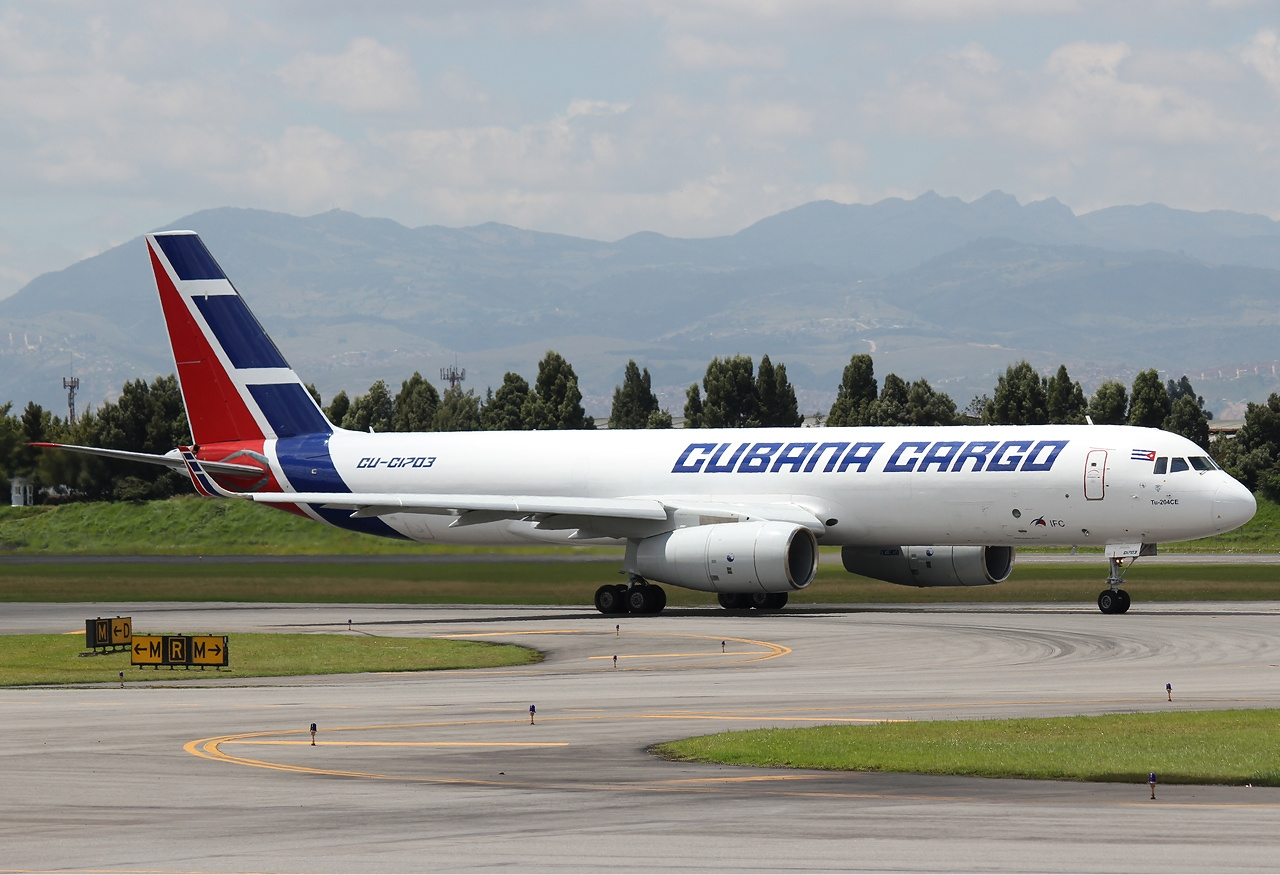
Tupolev Tu-204-100CE of Cubana Cargo

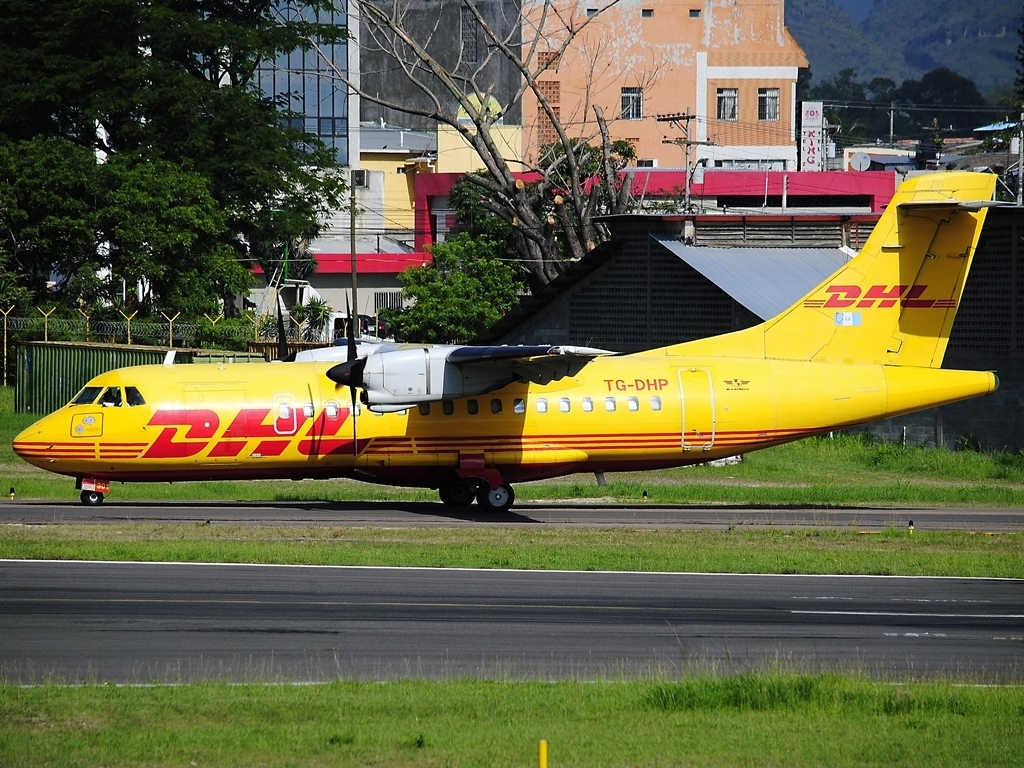
ATR 42-300F of DHL de Guatemala

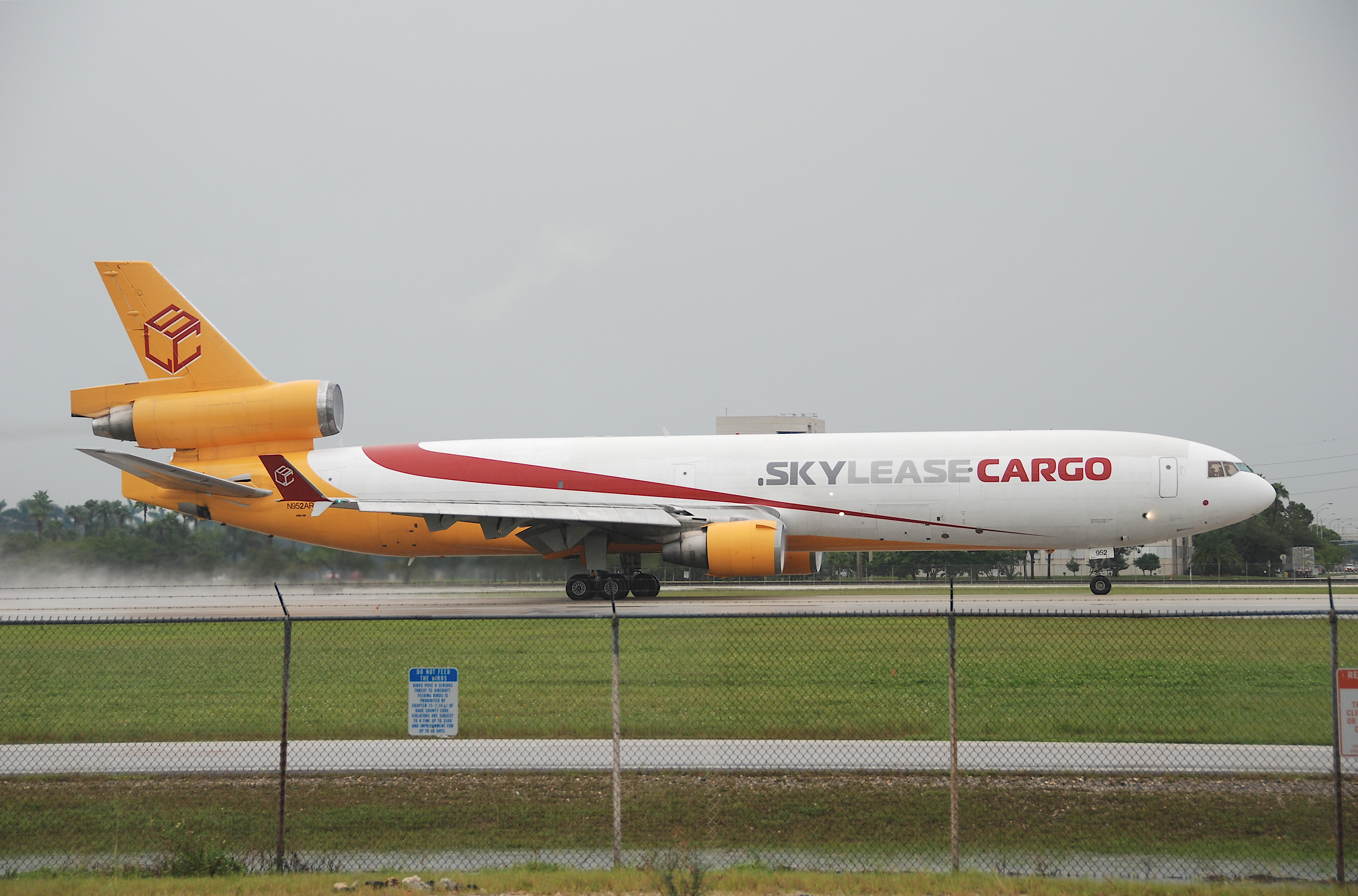
McDonnell Douglas MD-11F of Sky Lease Cargo

Canada

- Air Canada Cargo
- Cargojet
- KF Cargo
- Morningstar Air Express
- SkyLink Express

Cuba

- Cubana Cargo

Guatemala

- DHL de Guatemala

Mexico

- Aeronaves TSM
- AeroUnion
- Estafeta Carga Aérea
- Mas Air
- TUM AeroCarga

Panama

- DHL Aero Expreso

United States

- 21 Air
- ABX Air
- Air Cargo Carriers
- Air Transport International
- Aloha Air Cargo
- Amazon Air
- Ameriflight
- Amerijet International
- Atlas Air
- FedEx Express
- Kalitta Air
- Mountain Air Cargo
- National Airlines (N8)
- Northern Air Cargo
- Polar Air Cargo
- Sky Lease Cargo
- UPS Airlines
- USA Jet Airlines
- Western Global Airlines
- Wiggins Airways

== South America ==
Bolivia

- Transportes Aéreos Bolivianos

Brazil

- LATAM Cargo Brasil
- Sideral Linhas Aéreas
- Total Linhas Aéreas

Chile

- LATAM Cargo Chile

Colombia

- Aerosucre
- Avianca Cargo
- LATAM Cargo Colombia
- Lineas Aereas Suramericanas
- SADELCA
- SAEP

Cuba

- Cubana Cargo

Ecuador

- DHL Ecuador

Guatemala

- DHL de Guatemala

Panama

- DHL Aero Expreso

Uruguay

- Air Class Líneas Aéreas

Venezuela

- Solar Cargo
- Vensecar Internacional

== Asia ==
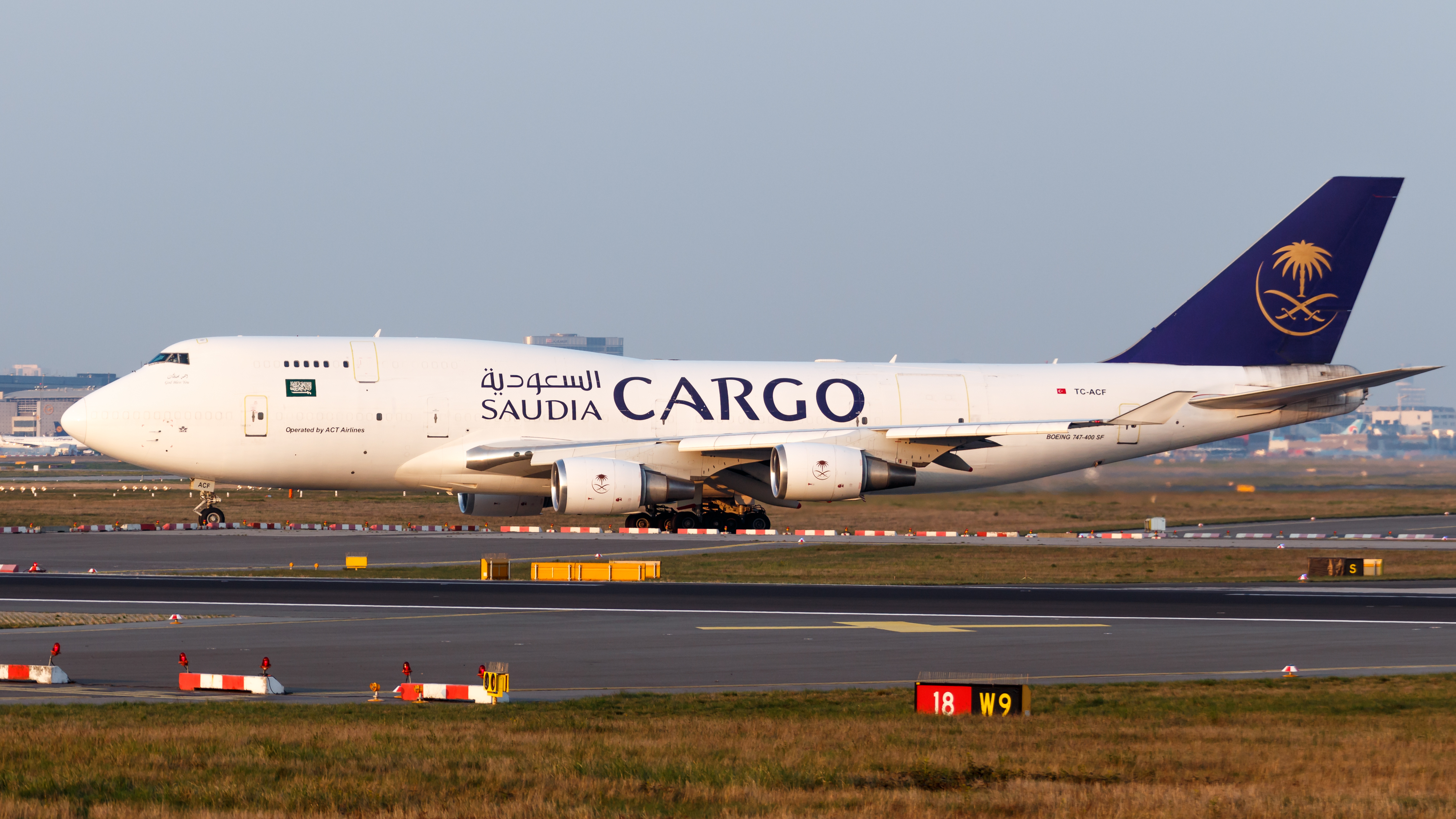
Boeing 747-400F of Saudia Cargo (now crashed)

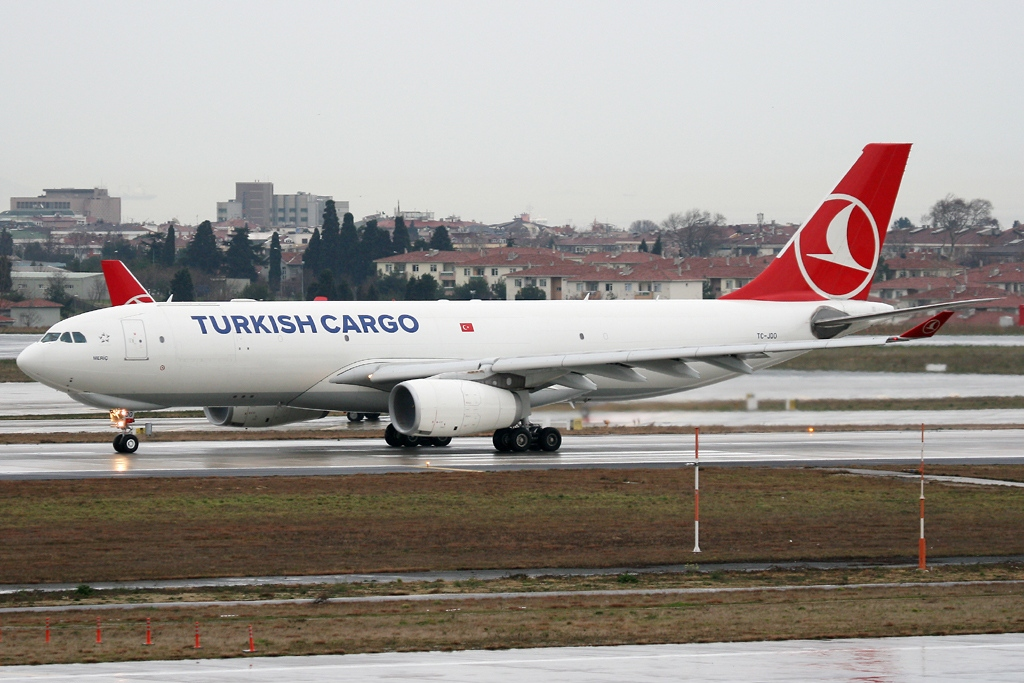
Airbus A330-243F of Turkish Cargo

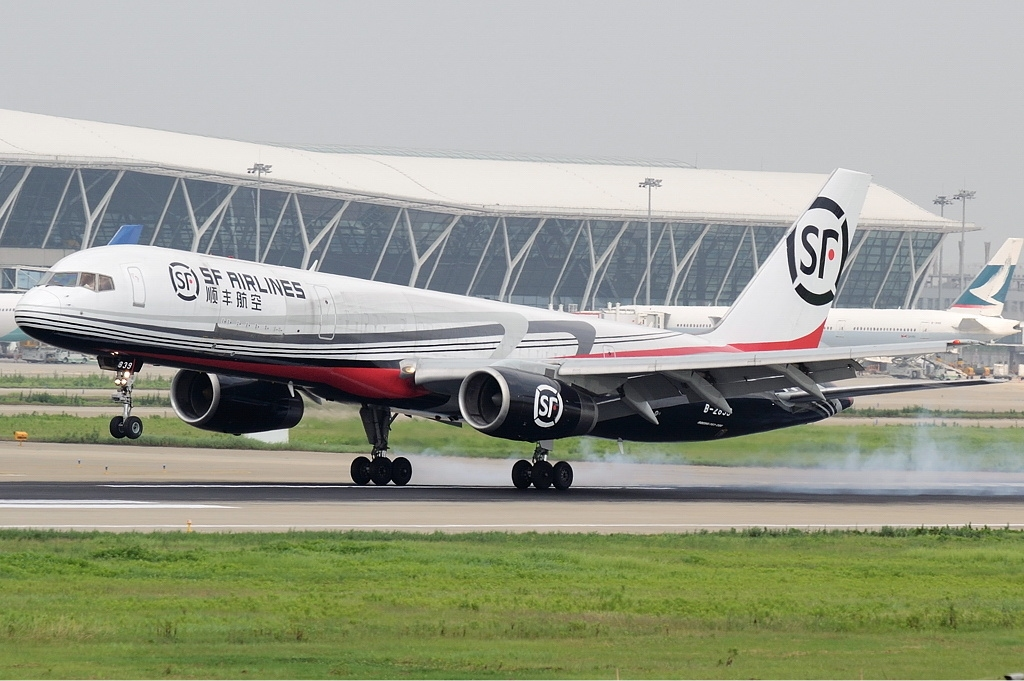
Boeing 757-200SF of SF Airlines

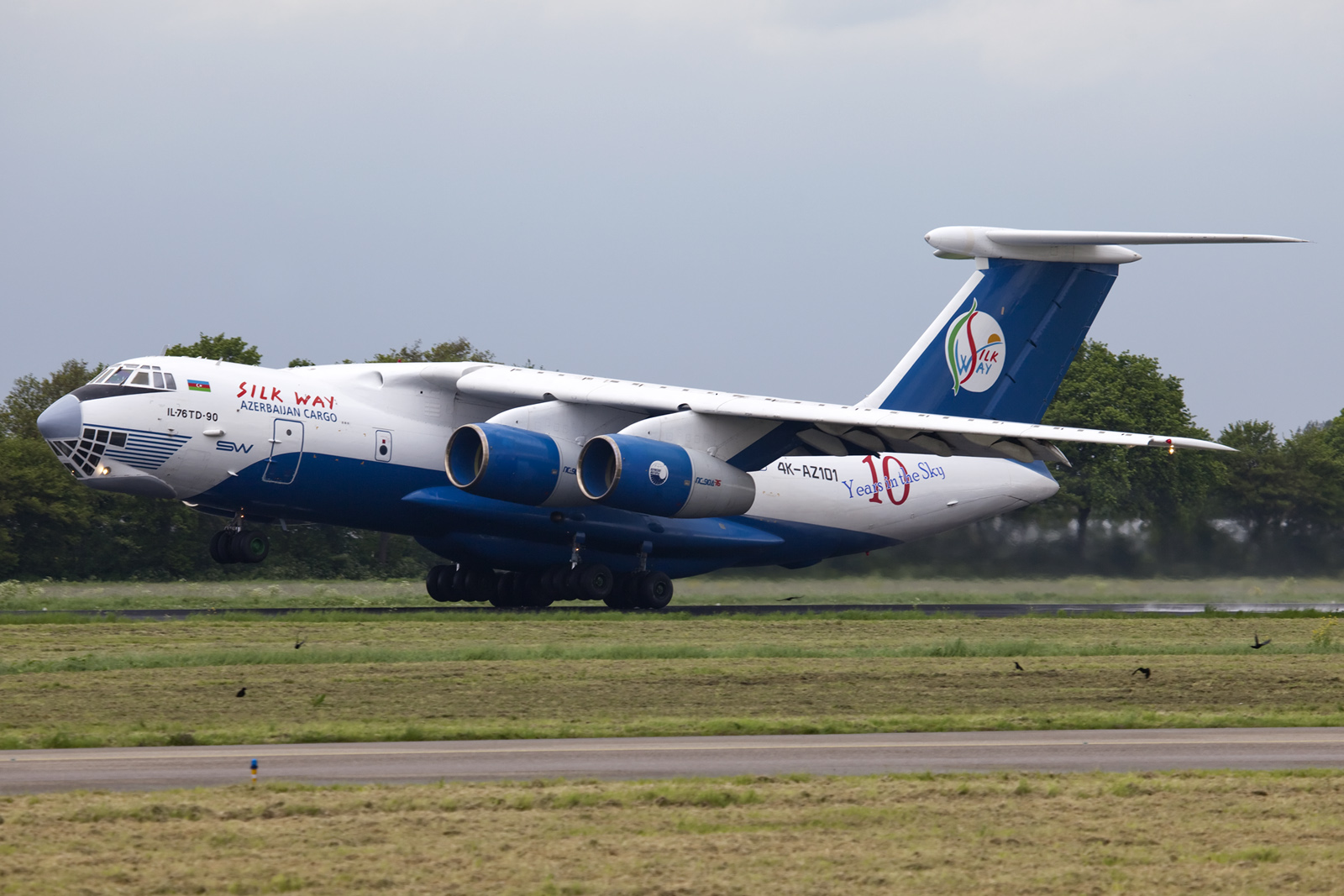
Ilyushin Il-76TD-90VD of Silk Way Airlines

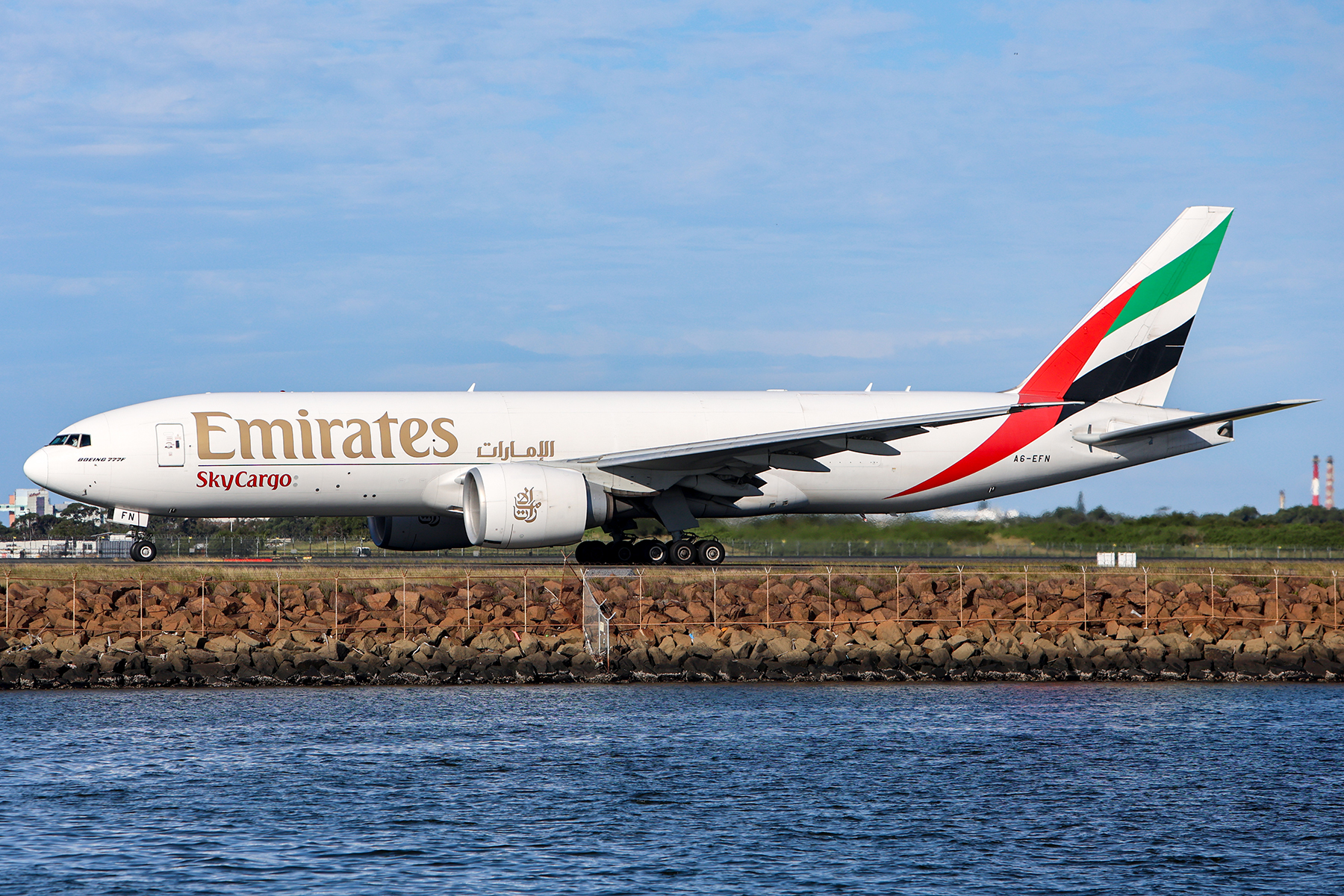
Boeing 777-F1H of Emirates SkyCargo

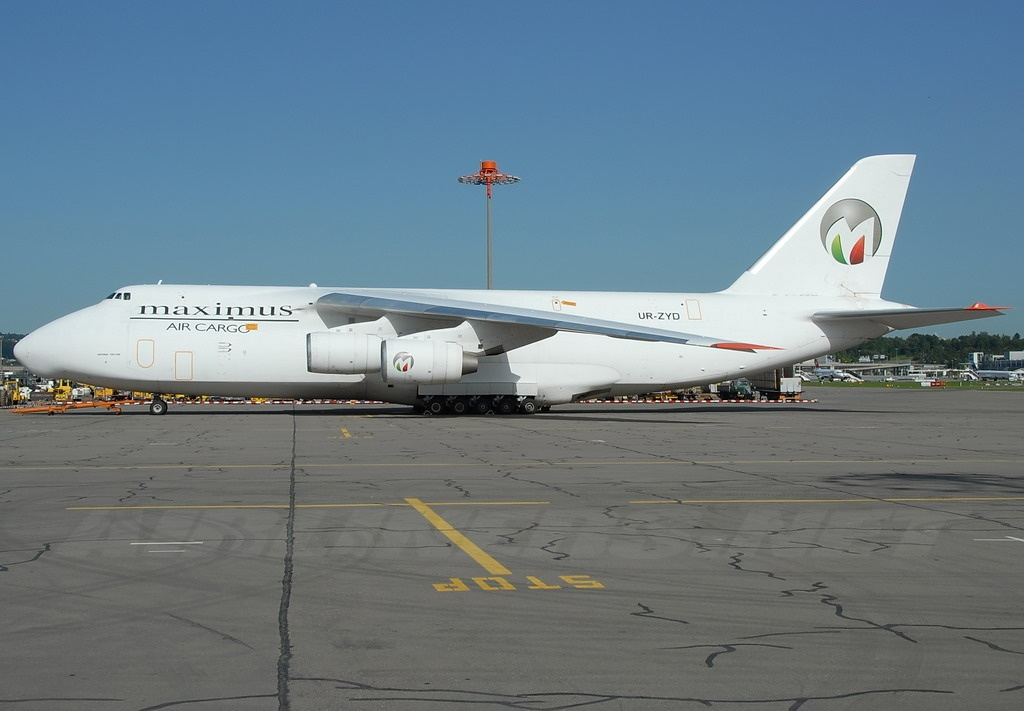
Antonov An-124-100 Ruslan of Maximus Air Cargo

Azerbaijan

- Azal Avia Cargo
- Silk Way Airlines
- Silk Way West Airlines

Bangladesh

- Bismillah Airlines
- Easy Fly Express
- Hello Airlines
- SkyAir

Bahrain

- DHL International Aviation ME

China

- Air Central
- Air China Cargo
- Air Hong Kong
- Cathay Pacific Cargo
- Central Airlines
- China Cargo Airlines
- China Postal Airlines
- SF Airlines
- YTO Cargo Airlines

India

- Blue Dart Aviation
- Quikjet Airlines
- SpiceXpress

Indonesia

- Cardig Air
- Cargo Garuda Indonesia
- Jayawijaya Dirgantara
- My Indo Airlines
- Tri-MG Intra Asia Airlines

Iran

- Iran Air Cargo
- Payam Air
- Pouya Cargo Air

Israel

- Challenge Airlines IL
- El Al Cargo

Japan

- ANA Cargo
- Nippon Cargo Airlines
- JAL Cargo

Malaysia

- AsiaCargo Express
- MASkargo
- My Jet Xpress Airlines
- Raya Airways
- World Cargo Airlines

Pakistan

- Vision Air International
- TCS Courier
- K2 Airways
- Air Eagle
- Air Falcon

Philippines

- 2GO Air
- Cebu Pacific Cargo
- Skyway Cargo Airlines
- LBC Express International Aviation

Qatar

- Qatar Airways Cargo

Saudi Arabia

- Saudia Cargo

Singapore

- Singapore Airlines Cargo

Sri Lanka

- FitsAir

South Korea

- AirZeta
- Asiana Cargo
- Korean Air Cargo

Taiwan

- China Airlines Cargo
- EVA Air Cargo

Thailand

- Air People International
- K-Mile Air

Turkey

- Air ACT
- MNG Airlines
- Turkish Cargo
- ULS Airlines Cargo

United Arab Emirates

- Emirates Sky Cargo
- Etihad Cargo
- Maximus Air Cargo

Uzbekistan

- My Freighter Airlines

== Europe ==
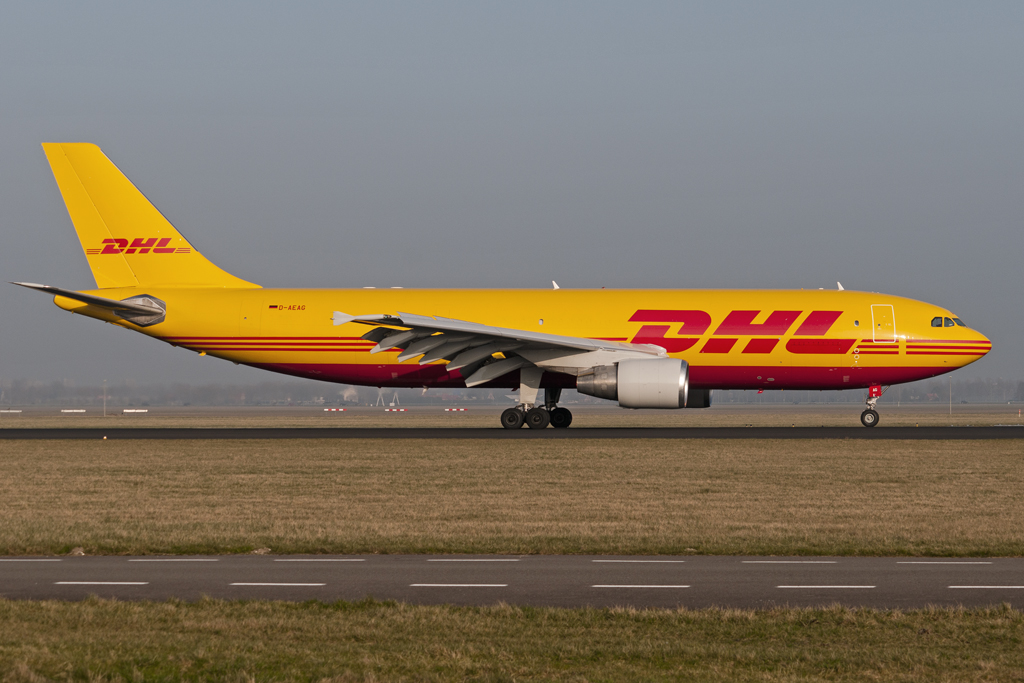
Airbus A300-600RF of EAT Leipzig

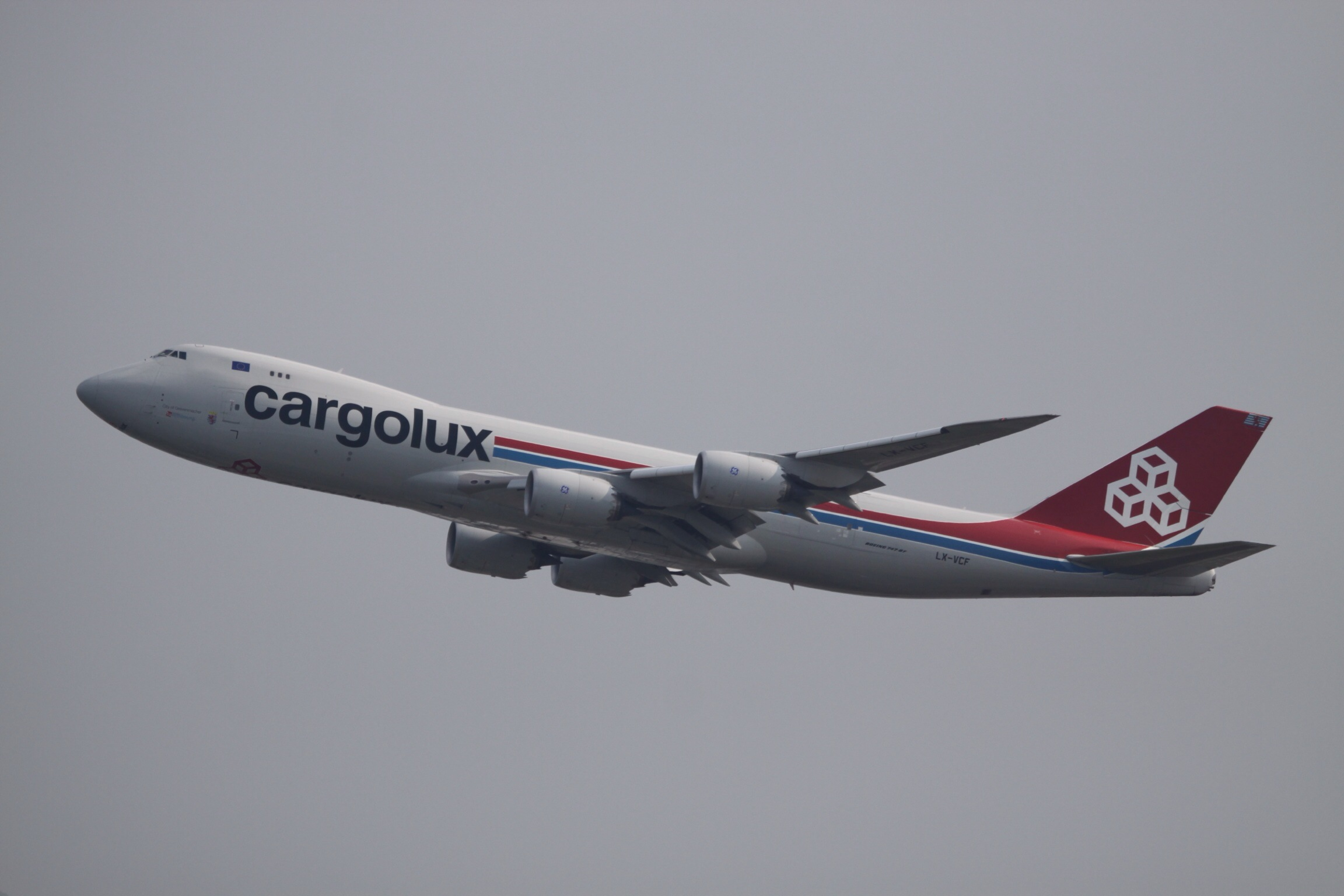
Boeing 747-8F of Cargolux

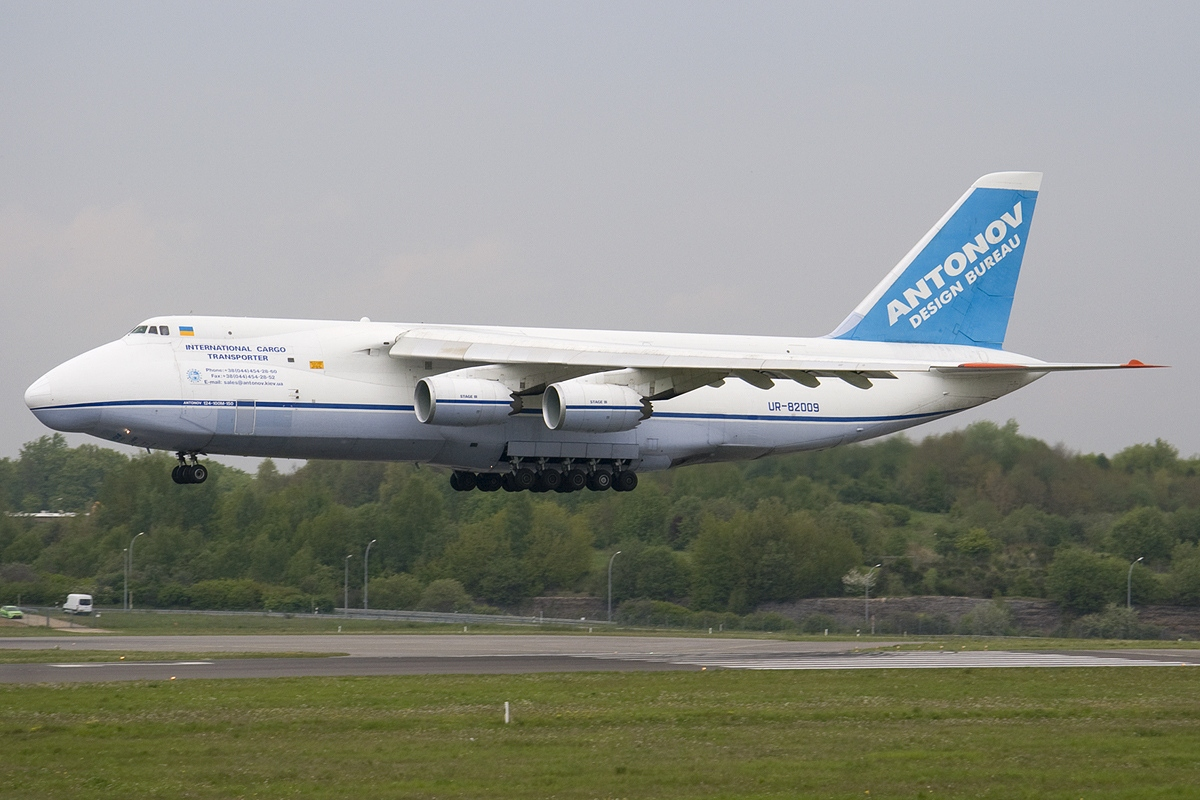
Antonov An-124-100M-150 Ruslan of Antonov Airlines

Belgium

- Air Belgium
- ASL Airlines Belgium

Bulgaria

- Cargoair
- Compass Cargo Airlines

Cyprus

- Euroavia Airlines

Denmark

- Maersk Air Cargo

Estonia

- Airest

France

- Air France Cargo
- ASL Airlines France
- CMA CGM Air Cargo

Germany

- AeroLogic
- European Air Transport Leipzig
- Lufthansa Cargo

Hungary

- ASL Airlines Hungary

Ireland

- ASL Airlines Ireland

Italy

- Cargolux Italia
- Poste Air Cargo

Luxembourg

- Cargolux

Moldova

- Fly Pro
- Pecotox Air

Netherlands

- KLM Cargo
- Martinair

Poland

- Exin
- SprintAir Cargo

Romania

- ROMCargo Airlines

Russia

- AirBridgeCargo
- ATRAN
- Aviastar-TU
- Sky Gates Airlines

Spain

- Cygnus Air
- Swiftair

Sweden

- West Air Sweden

United Kingdom

- Coyne Airways
- DHL Air UK
- European Cargo
- One Air
- West Atlantic UK

Ukraine

- Aerovis Airlines
- Antonov Airlines
- Cavok Air

== Oceania ==
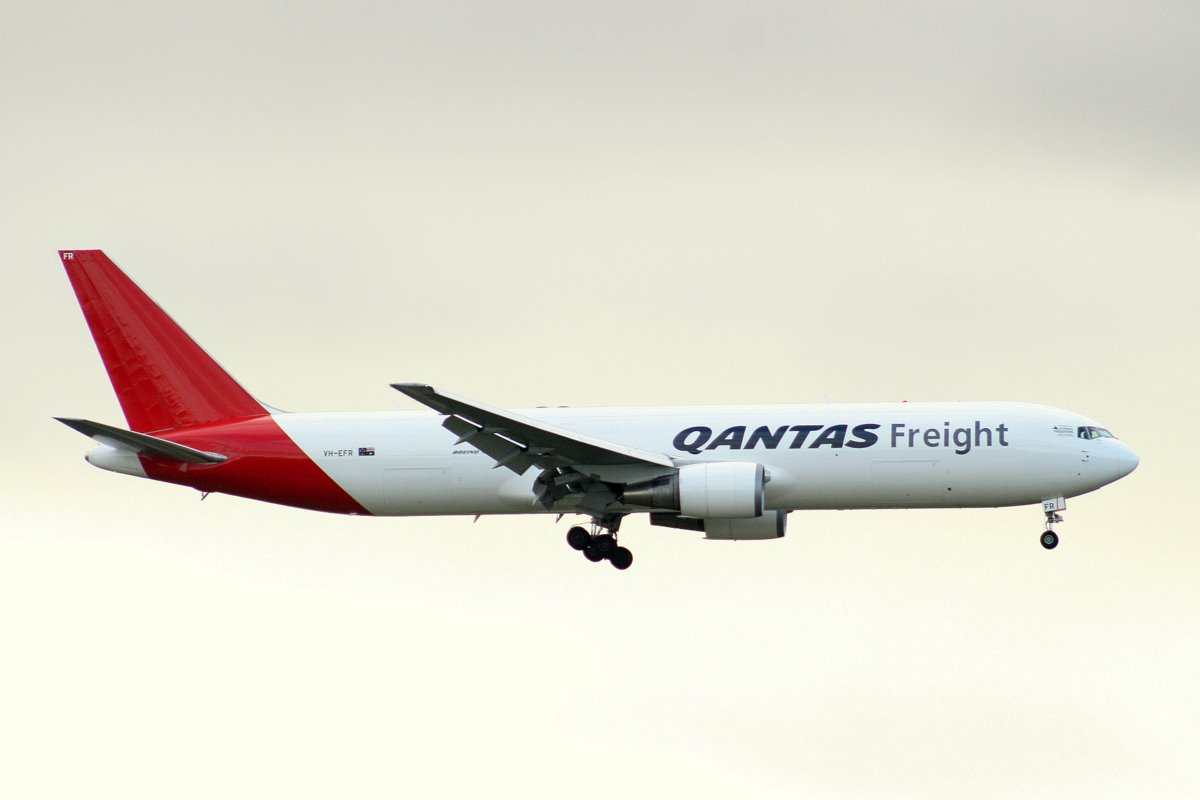
Boeing 767-300F of Qantas Freight

Australia

- ASL Airlines Australia
- Australian airExpress
- Express Freighters Australia
- Pacific Air Express
- Qantas Freight
- Tasman Cargo Airlines
- Team Global Express

Guam

- Asia Pacific Airlines

New Zealand

- Parcelair

== Defunct ==
=== Africa ===
Cameroon

- Cargo Airways International

South Africa

- African International Airways
- Imperial Air Cargo

Zimbabwe

- Avient Aviation
- Global Africa Aviation

=== Americas ===
Argentina

- Servicios de Transportes Aéreos Fueguinos
- Transporte Aéreo Rioplatense

Brazil

- ABSA Cargo
- BETA Cargo
- Brasmex – Brasil Minas Express
- COLT Cargo
- Itapemirim Transportes Aéreos
- Master Top Airlines
- Rio Linhas Aéreas
- Skymaster Airlines
- TAM Cargo
- Varig Logística
- VASPEX

Colombia

- Air Colombia
- Arca Colombia
- ATC Colombia
- LANCO
- Tampa Cargo

Chile

- LAN Cargo

Dominican Republic

- Aerolineas Mundo

Guatemala

- Aerovías
- RACSA

Mexico

- Aero León
- Aeropostal Cargo de México
- LATAM Cargo Mexico
- Mexicana Cargo
- Mexicargo
- Regional Cargo
- Westair de Mexico

Peru

- Cielos Airlines

United States

- Airborne Express
- AirNow
- Arrow Air
- ASTAR Air Cargo
- Capital Cargo International Airlines
- Centurion Air Cargo
- Challenge Air Cargo
- Express.Net Airlines
- Florida West International Airways
- Flying Tiger Line
- Focus Air Cargo
- Four Star Air Cargo
- Gemini Air Cargo
- NWA Cargo
- Pan Am Cargo
- Roblex Aviation
- Seaboard World Airlines
- Southern Air Transport
- Southern Air
- Tradewinds Airlines
- World Airways
- Wrangler Aviation

Uruguay

- Aero Uruguay

Venezuela

- Avensa Cargo
- Latin Carga

=== Asia ===
China

- Shanghai Airlines Cargo
- Uni-Top Airlines

India

- Air India Cargo
- Aryan Cargo Express
- Crescent Air Cargo
- Deccan 360
- Elbee Airlines
- Hinduja Cargo Services

Indonesia

- Megantara Air

Iran

- Fars Air Qeshm

Japan

- ANA & JP Express
- Orange Cargo

Kazakhstan

- Almaty Aviation

Malaysia

- Transmile Air Services

Philippines

- Pacific East Asia Cargo Airlines

Singapore

- Jett8 Airlines

Vietnam

- Trai Thien Air Cargo

=== Europe ===
Belgium

- Cargo B Airlines
- European Air Transport
- TNT Airways

Finland

- Nordic Global Airlines

Italy

- Alitalia Cargo
- Cargoitalia
- Fly Wex
- SixCargo

Luxembourg

- West Air Luxembourg

Netherlands

- Jet Link Holland
- Magic Bird
- Schreiner Airways

Russia

- Aeroflot-Cargo
- Aerofreight Airlines
- Airstars
- Atruvera Aviation
- Aviast Air
- KAPO Avia
- Specavia Air Company
- TESIS Aviation Enterprise

United Kingdom

- ACE Freighters
- Air Faisal
- British Airways World Cargo
- CargoLogicAir
- HD Air Ltd
- MK Airlines
- Transmeridian Air Cargo

== See also ==
- List of charter airlines
- List of low-cost airlines
- List of regional airlines
- Flag carrier
