= List of airlines of Colombia =

This is a list of airlines which have an air operator's certificate issued by the Civil Aviation Authority of Colombia.

== Active ==
=== Scheduled airlines ===
Airline	Image	IATA	ICAO	Callsign	Hub(s)	Founded	Notes
Avianca		AV	AVA	AVIANCA	Bogotá; Cali; Cartagena; Medellín-JMC	1919	Flag carrier.
Avianca Express		EX	AVR	AVAEXPRESS	Bogotá	2018	
Copa Airlines Colombia		P5	RPB	AEROREPUBLICA	Bogotá	2010	Operates with its parent company's fleet via exchange agreements.
Clic Air		VE	EFY	EASYFLY	Bogotá; Bucaramanga; Cali; Medellín-Olaya Herrera; Montería	2023	
JetSmart Colombia		J6	JEC	JETROCK	Bogotá Medellín-JMC	2023	
Moon Flights		MF	AMF		Medellín-Olaya Herrera	2021	
LATAM Airlines Colombia		4C	ARE	LAN COLOMBIA	Bogotá; Medellín-JMC	2016	
SATENA		9R	NSE	SATENA	Bogotá; Medellín-Olaya Herrera	1962	Government-owned.
Wingo		P5	RPB	AEROREPUBLICA	Bogotá	2016	

=== Charter airlines ===
Airline	Image	IATA	ICAO	Callsign	Hub(s)	Founded	Notes
AerUpia					Villavicencio	1993	
Central Charter de Colombia					Bogotá	1979	
Helicol			HEL	HELICOL	Bogotá	1955	
Searca		1EH	SRC	SEARCA	Barranquilla; Bogotá; Medellín-Olaya Herrera; San Andrés Island	1992	
SARPA				SARPA	Bogotá; Medellín-Olaya Herrera; Medellín-JMC	1980	
SELVA Colombia			SDV	SELVA	Villavicencio	1978	
Sociedad Aérea de Ibague					Chía	1992	
TAC Colombia			TCC	TAC	Cali; Medellín-Olaya Herrera	1995	

=== Cargo airlines ===
Airline	Image	IATA	ICAO	Callsign	Hub(s)	Founded	Notes
AerCaribe		JK	ACL	ADMIRE	Bogotá	1997	
Aerosucre		6N	KRE	AEROSUCRE	Bogotá	1969	
Aliansa - Aerolineas Andinas					Villavicencio	1989	
Avianca Cargo		QT	TPA	TAMPA	Bogotá; Medellín-JMC; Miami	1973	
LATAM Cargo Colombia		L7	LAE	LANCO	Bogotá	2016	
SADELCA			SDK	SADELCA	Bogotá	1974	
SAEP			KSP	SAEP	Bogotá	1980	

== Defunct ==
Airline	Image	IATA	ICAO	Callsign	Founded	Ceased operations	Notes
ACES Colombia		VX	AES	ACES	1971	2003	
Aero República		P5	RPB	AEROREPUBLICA	1992	2010	Rebranded as Copa Airlines Colombia.
AeroAtlantico Colombia			AOK		1980	2000	
Aeroasis					2006	2011	Never launched.
AeroBoyacá					2017	2025	Never launched; liquidated.
Aerocar Colombia			VSC	AEROCAR	1995	2000	
Aerocesar			AEC		1968	1983	
Aerocondor Colombia		OD		AEROCONDOR	1955	1980	
Aerocosta		CC		AERO	1965	1976	
Aeroexpreso Bogotá			ABO	AEROEXPRESO	1978	2007	
Aerolínea de Antioquia			ANQ	ANTIOQUIA	1987	2019	
Aerolíneas de la Paz					2004	2006	
Aerolíneas del Este					1975	2006	
Aerolíneas Medellín			AMD		1976	1979	
Aeronorte Colombia			ANR	AERONORTE	1972	1986	Renamed to Líneas Aéreas Suramericanas.
Aeropesca Colombia		RS		AEROPESCA	1960	1983	Rebranded as Intercontinental de Aviación.
AeroTACA		AT	ATK	AEROTACA	1965	2006	
Aerotal		XK	ART	AEROTAL	1970	1983	
Aerotaxi Colombia					1948	1972	Subsidiary of Avianca; liquidated.
Aerovanguardia					1993	2007	
Aexpa					2001	2020	
Air Colombia					1999	2019	
AIRES		4C	ARE	AIRES	1980	2011	Rebranded to LAN Colombia.
Alicol Colombia					1991	2000	
Arca Colombia		ZU	AKC	ARCA	1956	1997	
Arkas		K7	KRA	ARKAS	2007	2010	
ATC Colombia		TC	TCO	TRANSCOLOMBIA	1992	1999	
Avesca Colombia				AVESCA	1983	1995	Renamed to Aerocar Colombia.
Compañía Colombiana de Navegación Aérea					1919	1922	Colombia's first airline
Cosmos Colombia			KMS	COSMOS	2003	2014	
CV Cargo		V9	GSE		2010	2013	
EasyFly		VE	EFY	EASYFLY	2006	2023	Rebranded as Clic Air.
GCA Airlines		9A	GCA	GRAN COLOMBIA	2017	2022	
Global Colombia					1994	1998	
Heliandes					1998	2007	
Ibero Americana				IBERO	1994	1995	
Interandes Colombia			IAN		1979	1999	
Intercontinental de Aviación		RS	ICT	INTER	1983	2005	
Isleña Colombia			ILA	ISLEÑA	1993	1994	
LAC Colombia		LC	LIC	LAC	1974	1996	
LACOL Colombia			LAE	LACOL	1982	1999	
LAMA Colombia					1991	1991	
LAN Colombia		4C	ARE	LAN COLOMBIA	2011	2016	Renamed to LATAM Airlines Colombia.
LANCO		L7	LAE	LANCO	2009	2016	Renamed to LATAM Cargo Colombia.
LANSA				LANSA	1945	1954	
Latina de Aviación					1994	2009	
Líneas Aéreas La Urraca				URRACA	1962	1980	
Líneas Aéreas Suramericanas		4L	LAU	SURAMERICANO	1986	2023	
Lloyd Aéreo Colombiano					1954	1960	
Orion Air Cargo					2000	2011	
SACO				SACO	1933	1940	Merged with SCADTA to form Avianca.
SAM Colombia		MM	SAM	SAM	1945	2010	Merged into Avianca.
SEC Colombia			SEZ		1993	1999	
Tampa Cargo		QT	TPA	TAMPA	1973	2013	Rebranded as Avianca Cargo.
TAVINA			TVN	TAVINA	1973	1985	
Taxi Aereo del Guaviare				TAGUA	1976	2000	
Transamazonica			TAZ	AMAZON	1980	1999	Restarted as Air Colombia.
Transapel Express Colombia					1992	1994	Merged into SAEP.
Ultra Air		U0	ULS	AIR ULTRA	2020	2023	
Vertical de Aviación					1982	2023	Liquidated.
Vias Aéreas Colombianas				VIARCO	1999	2006	
Viva Air Colombia		VH	VVC	VIVA COLOMBIA	2009	2023	Bankrupt.
West Caribbean Airways		YH	WCW	WEST CARIBBEAN	1998	2005	

== See also ==
- List of airlines of the Americas
- List of defunct airlines of the Americas
- List of airlines
