= Thesis (disambiguation) =

A thesis (from Greek θέσις, from τίθημι tithemi, I put) is a formal academic work, also known as a dissertation.

Thesis may also refer to:

- Thesis statement, of a dissertation, essay, or other argumentative work
- Arsis and thesis, used to refer to the downbeat or accented part of a measure or declining part of a phrase

== Organisations, brands and companies ==
- Thesis (typeface), a font superfamily designed by Lucas de Groot
- Lancia Thesis, an executive car by Lancia

== Entertainment ==
- Tesis, a Spanish film
- Thesis (Jimmy Guiffre 3 album)
- Thesis (Matthew Shipp and Joe Morris album)
- The Thesis, album by The Ambassador

== Mathematics and logic ==
- A conjecture, especially one too vague to be formally stated or verified but useful as a working convention
- A hypothesis, especially one too vague to be formally stated or verified but useful as a working convention
- A proposition

== Humanities ==
- In philosophy, the first stage of a dialectic, as in thesis, antithesis, synthesis

== See also ==
- TESIS Aviation Enterprise, a cargo airline from Russia
