= APSA =

APSA may refer to:

- Administration of the Patrimony of the Apostolic See, an institution of the Holy See, Vatican City
- Aerolíneas Peruanas S.A., the former national airline of Peru
- African Peace and Security Architecture, a peace and security policy framework of the African Union
- Alto Palermo S.A., an Argentine real estate company
- American Pediatric Surgical Association, an American professional association
- American Physician Scientists Association, a professional organization
- American Political Science Association, a professional association
- APSA Colombia, an airline based in Bogotá, Colombia
- Asia Pacific Screen Awards, an international cultural initiative of the UN, based in Australia
- London All Peoples' Sports Association football club, a non-League football team who play in the Essex Senior Football League

== See also ==
- Appa Ali Apsa, a character from DC Comics
- G-APSA, a model of the Douglas DC-6 aircraft
