= Isleña Colombia =

Colombian airline from 1993 to 1994

Isleña de Aviación S.A.
IATA	ICAO	Call sign
-	ILA	ISLEÑA
- Founded: 1993
- Commenced operations: November 6, 1993
- Ceased operations: July 8, 1994
- Hubs: Gustavo Rojas Pinilla International Airport
- Fleet size: 3
- Destinations: 4
- Headquarters: San Andrés, Colombia

Isleña de Aviación S.A. was a Colombian domestic airline based at Gustavo Rojas Pinilla International Airport on the island of San Andres, in Colombia.

== History ==
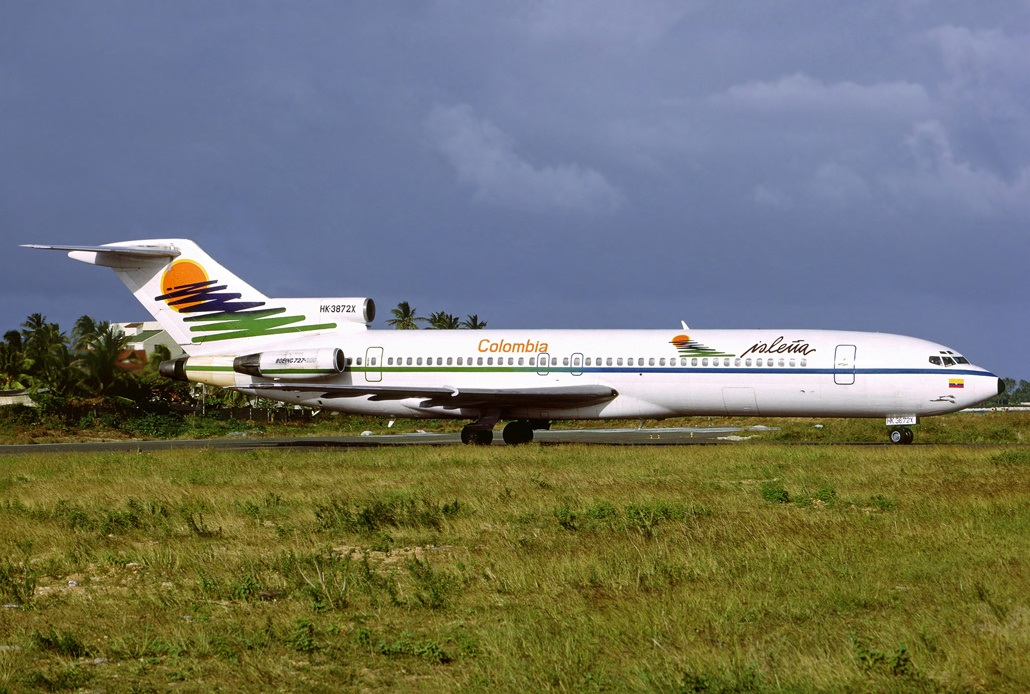
An Isleña Boeing 727-200 at Gustavo Rojas Pinilla International Airport in 1994

In 1993, a group of private shareholders who owned hotels in San Andrés founded the airline with the idea of specializing in the national tourism of the San Andrés, also linked hotels on the island to organize tour packages. The company started with charter flights, with 2 rented Boeing 727-200. The airline later acquired a Boeing 727-100 with flights to Bogotá, Cali and Medellín. With the first aircraft, flights began on November 6, 1993.

=== Bankruptcy ===
In June 1994, the airline was accused of carrying out illegal flights on which narcotics were transported, and then its liquidation was ordered, without having completed a year of operations. This demonstrated the need to supply the domestic market and create new airlines that competed with the other airlines in the country, like Avianca, SAM, Intercontinental de Aviación and ACES.

== Destinations ==
Colombia

- Bogotá (El Dorado International Airport)
- Cali (Alfonso Bonilla Aragón International Airport)
- Medellín (José María Córdova International Airport)
- San Andrés (Gustavo Rojas Pinilla International Airport) Hub

== Fleet ==
Isleña operated the following aircraft:

- 1 Boeing 727-100
- 2 Boeing 727-200

== See also ==
- List of defunct airlines of Colombia
