= Aexpa =

Colombian airline

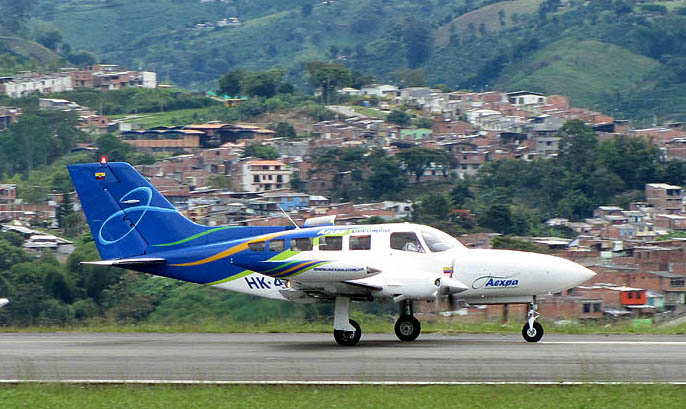
- Founded: 2002
- Ceased operations: March 30, 2020
- Hubs: Matecaña International Airport
- Fleet size: 3
- Destinations: 8
- Headquarters: Pereira, Colombia
- Website: www.aexpa.com.co

Aexpa S.A. (full name is Aero Expreso del Pacífico) was a charter airline based at Matecaña International Airport in Pereira, Colombia. Founded in 2002, it carried passengers and cargo charter flights in the Pacific coast and in the coffee region. It had 3 small aircraft, making it a fixed route network, but on request, they fly to almost all airports in the region.

The airline used are 2 Cessna C401/402, 1 Piper PA-34 Seneca.

In a statement posted on their Facebook page on March 17, 2020, they announced the suspension of their operations with a tentative date of March 30, depending on the evolution of the COVID-19 pandemic. Since then, the airline has not resumed operations.

== Services ==
- Buenaventura
- Cali
- Condoto
- Medellín
- Nuqui
- Pizarro
- Quibdo
- Vigia del Fuerte

== See also ==
- List of airlines of Colombia
