= LANSA (Colombia) =

Colombian airline, 1945–1954

IATA	ICAO	Call sign
—	—	LANSA
- Founded: 1945
- Ceased operations: 1954
- Hubs: Aeródromo Las Nieves
- Focus cities: Barranquilla
- Fleet size: 5
- Destinations: 34 destinations and 4 of them were international
- Parent company: Limitada Nacional de Servicio Aéreo
- Headquarters: Barranquilla, Colombia

Lansa (acronym for Limitada Nacional de Servicio Aéreo y luego de Líneas Aéreas Nacionales) was an airline company based in Barranquilla, Colombia.

== History ==
=== The Beginning ===
After 1945 the company, Avianca had a complete monopoly over the airline industry. A couple of mechanics and pilots decided to form their own company on May 7, 1945, in the city of Barranquilla. Captain Ernesto Recaman Saravia was the first company leader of Lansa. His first actions of being the company leader were the purchase of four Canadian-made Avro Anson 625A aircraft. Each Avro had a capacity of a maximum of eight passengers. Lansa built their first airfield, only 2 kilometers away from Paseo Colón. The airfield was named "Las Nieves" which translates to "the snows". It was equipped with a 1400 meter long track next to a wooden shed that served as an air terminal. The first planes were delivered to "Las Nieves" on September 3, 1945.

=== Outcome ===
Lansa as a result of its success from its Atlantic coast routes and in Medellín and Bogotá, the company then acquired four Douglas DC-3 aircraft after having a successful year in 1946. In that same year, Lansa became a publicly traded company and changing its name to Línea Aéreas Nacionales S.A. After having been 2 years in the airline industry, Lansa accumulated 18 DC-3 aircraft. Its services were extended to the Caribbean Region, Neiva, Garzón, Popayán and Ipiales in the south of the country of Colombia. In 1948 there were negotiations of acquiring three Martin 202 aircraft, which had a maximum capacity of up to 40 passengers. However those negotiations were never finalized and the deal was off.

=== Internationalization ===
Lansa's first international flight was on February 8, 1947, from Barranquilla to Maracaibo. In order to expand its international operations, Lansa decided to request routes from Cartagena and Barranquilla to Havana and Miami, with the aim of competing directly with Avianca. This was the first major move by Lansa to compete internationally with Avianca. Also that year in 1947, two DC-4s were bought from the Argentine Merchant Air Fleet. Under the direction of Humberto Zimmermann, former Avianca worker, Lansa airmail services were inaugurated on June 22, 1950, then that the National Government awarded him a contract for the transport of mail and parcels.

== Decline ==
The gradual decline of the company after having such great success in its early days was due to several fatal accidents that happened in 1951, the accidents seriously damaged the companies reputation and financial losses. At that point many stockholders came with the choice that to be smart with their money, they would sell their stake to Avianca. Lansa having now majority of its stock being owned by Avianca. lost its fight against Avianca making the entirety of the purpose for the companies formation now defunct. At that point the company became a subsidiary to Avianca. Although Lansa maintained its identity independently for the next three years, in 1954 it completed its integration process in Avianca, which resulted in a definitive cessation of operations and in the transfer of its fleet from DC-3 to Avianca, while the other planes were sold to third parties. The entire companies assets and fleet were liquidated by the end of 1954.

== Fleet ==
- Avro Anson 625A
- Douglas DC-3
- Douglas DC-4
- Curtiss C-46 (cargo)
- Martin 202 (Not operational because it was never bought)

== See also ==
- List of airlines of Colombia
- List of defunct airlines of Colombia
