= Aeroasis =

Passenger and cargo airline based at El Dorado Airport

AerOasis S.A.
- Founded: March 2006
- Ceased operations: c. 2011
- Hubs: El Dorado International Airport
- Focus cities: Alfonso Bonilla Aragón International Airport; Gustavo Rojas Pinilla International Airport; José María Córdova International Airport
- Parent company: Corso y Cia.
- Headquarters: Bogotá, Colombia
- Key people: Nicolás Cortazar (CEO)
- Employees: ~150 (2011)
- Website: www.aeroasis.com

AerOasis was a startup airline based in El Dorado International Airport.

== History ==
The airline was established in March 2006 by the Cortazar Family, and had initially planned to begin operations in November 2007 with five Boeing 737-300 aircraft. Reportedly, Spirit Airlines was interested in purchasing the airline, but plans fell through.

It had announced a partnership with LAN Airlines in May 2010, who intended to expand into Colombia and would provide technical support for the airline. AerOasis was set to start operations by February 2011 with a fleet of three Airbus A320 aircraft, and would become a subsidiary of LAN Airlines if purchased. However, after LAN acquired the Colombian airline AIRES in November 2010, LAN changed plans and decided to stop its plans for AerOasis by the next year, despite almost obtaining an operating certificate.

== See also ==
- List of airlines of Colombia
