= GCA Airlines =

Colombian airline, 2019–2022

Gran Colombia de Aviación
IATA	ICAO	Call sign
9A	GCA	GRAN COLOMBIA
- Founded: August 17, 2017
- Commenced operations: November 29, 2019
- Ceased operations: April 25, 2022
- Hubs: Alfonso Bonilla Aragón International Airport
- Fleet size: 5
- Destinations: 7
- Parent company: Avior Airlines
- Headquarters: Cali, Colombia
- Key people: Jorge Luis Añez (CEO)
- Website: www.gcaair.com

Gran Colombia de Aviación S.A.S., operating as GCA Airlines, was a Colombian airline subsidiary of Avior Airlines. It was registered at Ibague, based in the city of Cali and with a hub at Alfonso Bonilla Aragón International Airport in the city of Palmira that provided its services to the city from Santiago de Cali.

== History ==
GCA Airlines was registered with the Chamber of Commerce of the city of Ibague on August 17, 2017, and permits were also requested from the Colombian Civil Aeronautics on August 30 of the same year in order to have its constitution as a transportation company approved, along with several national and international routes. On that occasion, Civil Aeronautics approved its constitution as well as all the requested routes except for the Cali - Valencia route, which was postponed.

Initially, in the request submitted to Aerocivil, the Perales Airport in the city of Ibague was conceived as the airline's hub, but the delay in the modernization works of the airport limited progress in its certification, prompting the request for the transfer to Alfonso Bonilla Aragón International Airport.

Although the Cali - Valencia route was postponed, it was reconsidered and approved by Aerocivil considering that it is a Colombian airline and the current restriction only applies to Venezuelan airlines until the moment in which reciprocity and equitable access issues are normalized the markets.

On July 11, 2018, the airline's first aircraft arrived at El Dorado International Airport, a Boeing 737-400 that was later moved to Cali to start the certification procedures before the Civil Aeronautics. On November 29, 2019, the airline commenced operations with a flight between the Alfonso Bonilla Aragón International Airport in Cali, and the Rafael Núñez International Airport in the city of Cartagena.

On April 25, 2022, GCA Airlines had suspended their operations due to financial difficulties. The airline was completely folded in January 2023.

== Destinations ==
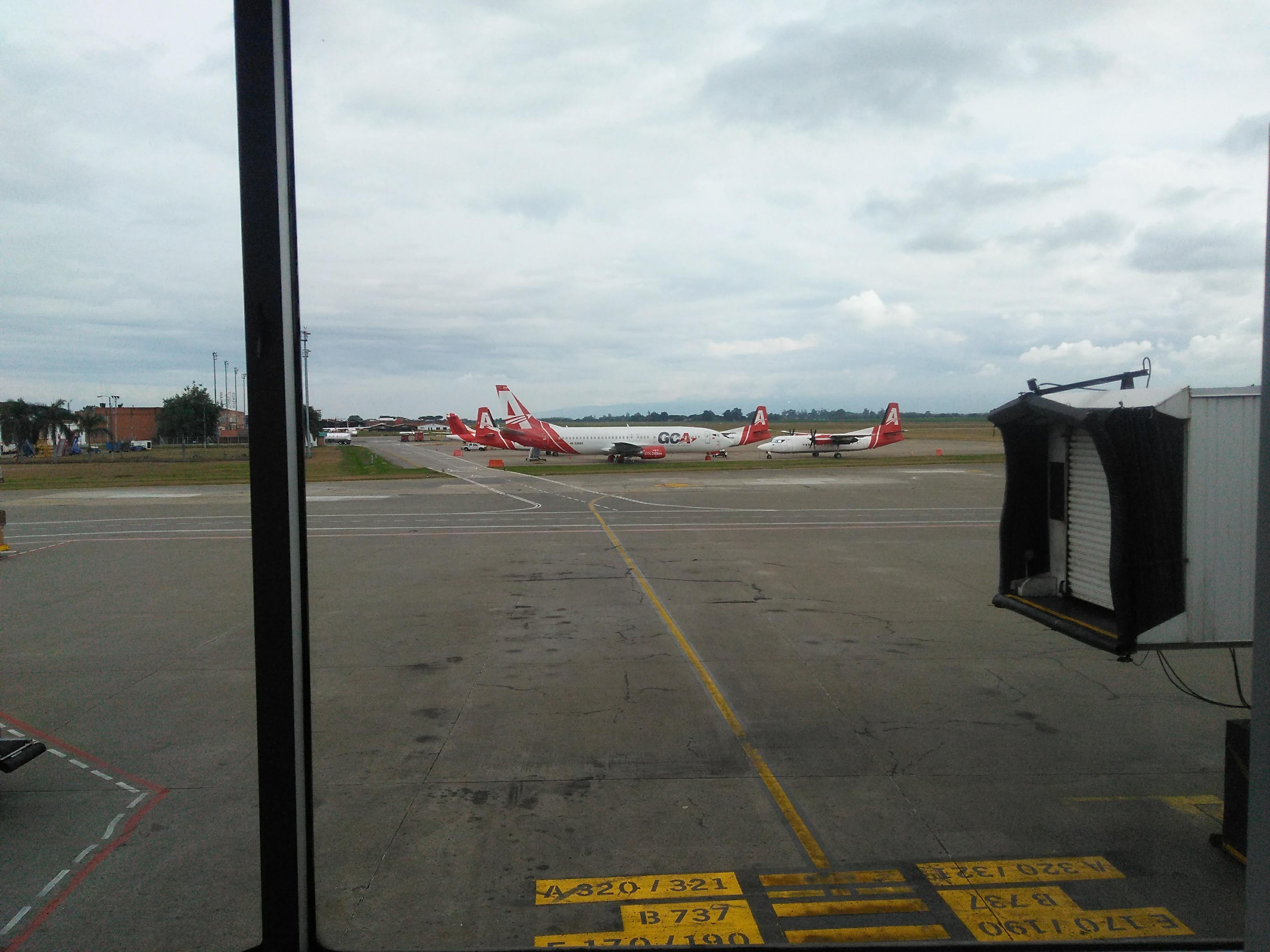
A Boeing 737-400 and three Fokker 50s of CGA parked at Alfonso Bonilla Aragón International Airport in 2018

By June 2021, GCA Airlines flew to the following destinations:

Country	City	Airport	Notes	Refs
Colombia	Barranquilla	Ernesto Cortissoz International Airport		
Colombia	Bucaramanga	Palonegro International Airport		
Colombia	Cali	Alfonso Bonilla Aragón International Airport	Hub	
Colombia	Cartagena	Rafael Núñez International Airport		
Colombia	Cúcuta	Camilo Daza International Airport		
Colombia	Pereira	Matecaña International Airport		
Colombia	San Andrés	Gustavo Rojas Pinilla International Airport		

== Fleet ==
As of April 2022, GCA Airlines operated the following aircraft:

GCA Airlines fleet
Aircraft	In service	Orders	Passengers			Notes
Aircraft	In service	Orders	C	Y	Total	Notes
Boeing 737-400	2	2	12	132	144	
Fokker 50	3	—	–	50	50	Never entered service
Total	5	2				

== See also ==
- Avior Airlines
- List of airlines of Colombia
