= ATC Colombia =

Colombian cargo airline, 1992–1999

Aero Transcolombiana de Carga
IATA	ICAO	Call sign
TC	TCO	TRANSCOLOMBIA
- Founded: 1992
- Commenced operations: 1993
- Ceased operations: 1999
- Hubs: El Dorado International Airport
- Fleet size: 3
- Headquarters: Bogotá, Colombia
- Employees: 120 (1998)

ATC Colombia (legally Aero Transcolombiana de Carga Ltda) was a cargo airline created in early 1992 with Colombian partners from the United States and Venezuela. Operating with Douglas DC-8 airplanes, it became the second Colombian cargo company. It ceased its entire operations in 1999.

== History ==
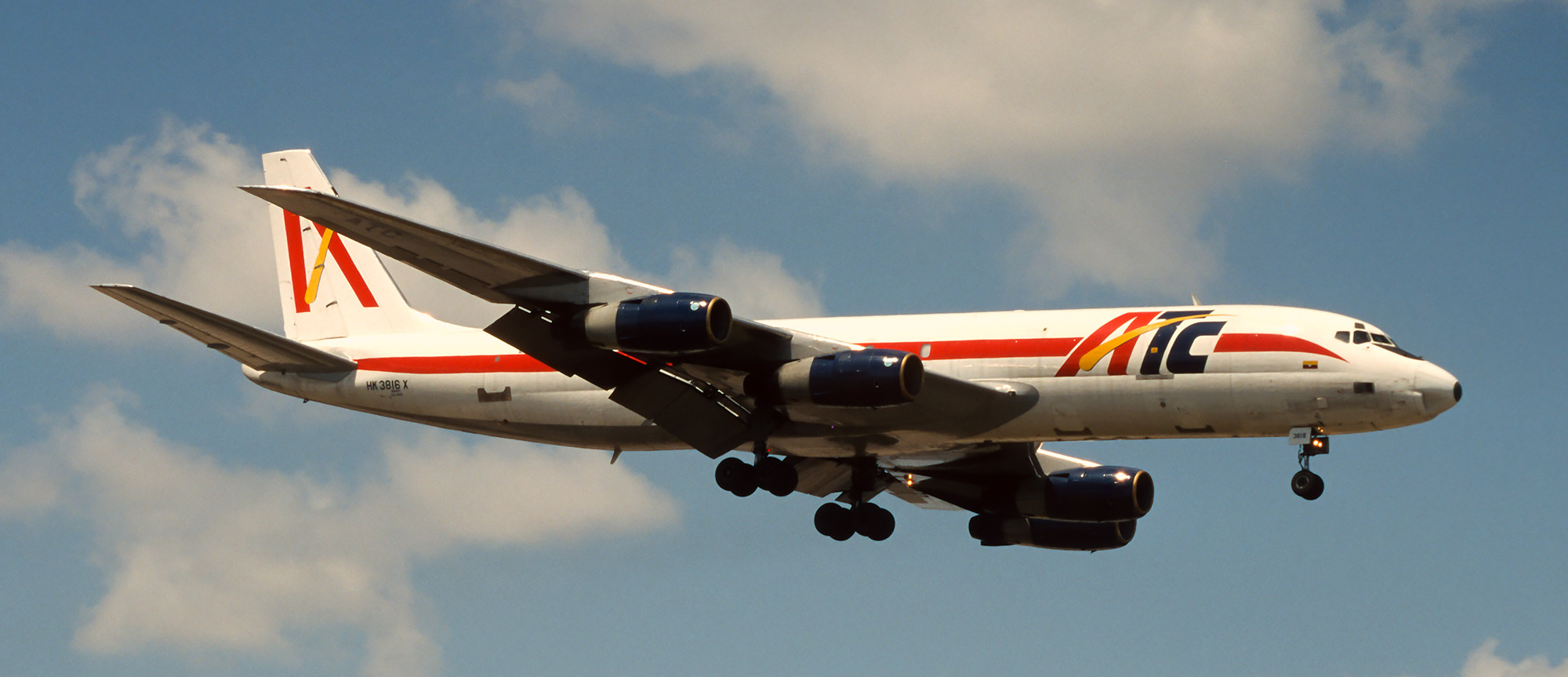
An ATC Douglas DC-8-51F on approach to Miami International Airport in 1998

ATC began operating between Miami and several points in Colombia with their own Douglas DC-8-51F (HK-3816X), acquired from Agro Air. To satisfy their consumer demand, additional planes were occasionally leased from Fine Air, based in Miami. Its main partner in Colombia was a man named Miguel Canal. At the end of 1995, under the presidency of Carlos Child, a second DC-8-51F (N507DC) was brought in and the rental system of additional aircraft to Fine Air was continued, including the Douglas DC-8-61F, which were larger and therefore they could transport more cargo. Meanwhile, Fine Air, which had shares in ATC, tried several times to obtain a license to fly to Colombia, which the American government always denied. That same year, Miguel Canal, who ran the company for two years, retired from direct management of the company.

In 1996, ATC made a special operation to become the number one company in the management of export flowers and the mobilization of this product between Bogotá and Miami. ATC inaugurated in September in the same year new facilities at the El Dorado International Airport in Bogotá. In February 1997, as Colombian-American relations had worsened due to the scandal of the government of President Samper, and the de-categorization of Civil Aviation, ATC was recertified by the Civil Aviation and the FAA of the United States. In this way, the company became the second Colombian freight transporter after Tampa Cargo. In the same year, a DC-8-51F (N508DC) was temporarily leased. ATC had 30 of its own crew, including pilots, co-pilots and flight engineers. The company's personnel plant in 1998 was 120 employees, counting those from Colombia and abroad. In 1999, ATC reached an agreement with the Cargolux company in Luxembourg, to operate direct flights to Europe, especially to transport flowers. In February 1999, a weekly frequency from Bogotá to Luxembourg was included using the Boeing 747-400 freighters. This cargo transport alliance is similar to a code-share agreement in the case of passenger flights, the transport of ATC cargo on Cargolux airplanes using ATC air guides.

By 1999, as noise level problems began in their DC-8 turbines, ATC sought to convert the engines to Stage 3 or replace the flight equipment. Fine Air managed to convert the turbines to Stage 3, in the workshops it had in Miami. Meanwhile, the owners of Fine Air (Frank and Barry Fine) bought Arrow Air and started these two joint operations. At the same time, Arrow began leasing planes to ATC for operations in the high seasons. In this way, with the collaboration of ATC, Arrow was able to maintain their current permit in Colombia.

Given the impossibility of negotiating with the Civil Aviation noise level problems to convert the Douglas DC-8 turbines to Stage 3, Carlos Child withdrew the operating license to the airline in mid-1999, which forced the company to suspend operations definitively and went into liquidation immediately. The DC-8 HK-3816-X was scrapped in Miami in March 2001 and the DC-8 N507DC was returned to Fine Air. ATC's operations were replaced by Arrow Air, with Fine Air going bankrupt in 2002 and sold by banks.

== Facilities ==
The ATC facilities in Miami consisted of X-ray equipment, cold room and security personnel to receive the perishable cargo and warehouse for the receipt and palletizing of the merchandise. In Bogotá, an agreement was established with Aerosucre to use the cargo terminal at the airport, but with personnel hired directly by the airline. Sometimes special flights were made to Lima and Valencia.

== Fleet ==
ATC had formerly consisted the following aircraft:

- 3 Douglas DC-8-51F

== See also ==
- Miami International Airport
- List of defunct airlines of Colombia
