= LATAM Cargo Colombia =

Cargo airline of Colombia

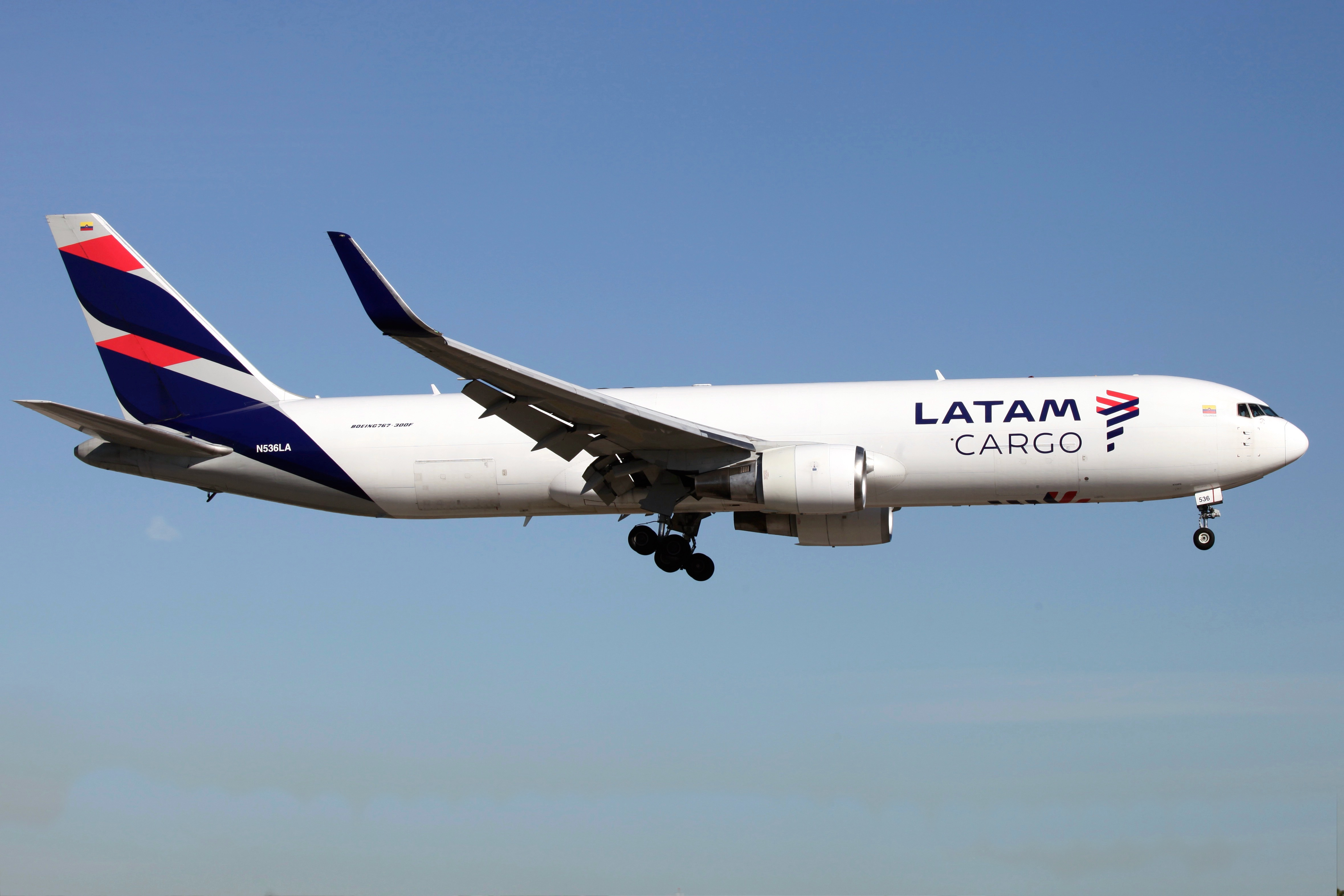
IATA	ICAO	Call sign
L7	LAE	LANCO
- Founded: February 2009; 17 years ago (as LANCO)
- Commenced operations: March 27, 2009; 17 years ago
- Hubs: Bogotá
- Focus cities: Medellín–JMC; Miami
- Fleet size: 6
- Destinations: 21
- Parent company: LATAM Airlines Group
- Headquarters: Bogotá, Colombia
- Key people: Diego Pardo Tobar (Chairman)
- Website: www.latamcargo.com

LATAM Cargo Colombia (formerly known as Línea Aérea Carguera de Colombia S.A. or LANCO for short) is a Colombian cargo airline based in Bogotá with its main base at El Dorado International Airport. LANCO operated under its own branding for a brief period in 2009, when it was changed to the appearance of sister company LAN Cargo.

It is a sister company of LATAM Cargo Brasil and LATAM Cargo Chile.

On 26 May 2020, LATAM filed for Chapter 11 bankruptcy in the United States due to economic problems attributed to the impact of the COVID-19 pandemic on aviation, although they are currently operating and have been negotiating terms. In August, the company announced its second-quarter results, projecting improved operational prospects.

== Destinations ==
LATAM Cargo Colombia serves the following as of October 2023:

Country	City	Airport	Notes	Refs
Brazil	Campinas	Viracopos-Campinas International Airport		
Brazil	Manaus	Eduardo Gomes International Airport		
Brazil	Rio de Janeiro	Rio de Janeiro/Galeão International Airport		
Chile	Santiago	Arturo Merino Benítez International Airport		
Colombia	Barranquilla	Ernesto Cortissoz International Airport		
Colombia	Bogotá	El Dorado International Airport	Hub	
Colombia	Cali	Alfonso Bonilla Aragón International Airport		
Colombia	Medellín	José María Córdova International Airport	Focus city	
Costa Rica	San José	Juan Santamaria International Airport		
Dominican Republic	Santo Domingo	Las Américas International Airport		
Ecuador	Guayaquil	José Joaquín de Olmedo International Airport		
Ecuador	Quito	Mariscal Sucre International Airport		
El Salvador	San Salvador	El Salvador International Airport		
Guatemala	Guatemala City	La Aurora International Airport		
Netherlands	Amsterdam	Amsterdam Airport Schiphol		
Panama	Panama City	Tocumen International Airport		
Paraguay	Asunción	Silvio Pettirossi International Airport		
Paraguay	Ciudad del Este	Guarani International Airport		
Peru	Lima	Jorge Chávez International Airport		
Turkey	Istanbul	Istanbul Airport		
United States	Huntsville	Huntsville International Airport		
United States	Miami	Miami International Airport	Focus city	
Uruguay	Montevideo	Carrasco International Airport		
Venezuela	Caracas	Simón Bolívar International Airport	Terminated	

== Fleet ==
=== Current fleet ===
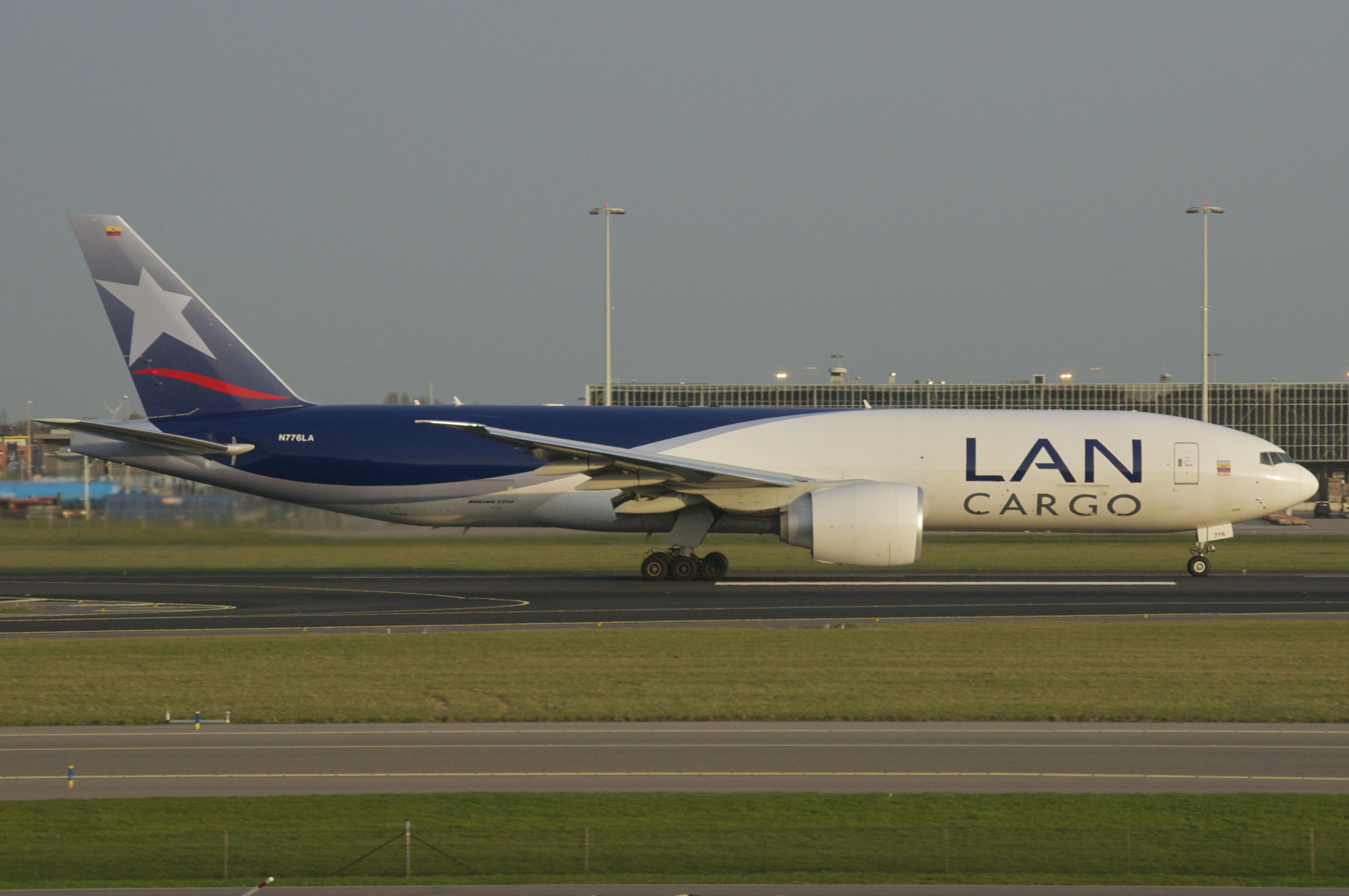
LANCO Boeing 777F operating in the former LAN Cargo livery at Amsterdam Airport Schiphol in 2013

As of July 2026, LATAM Cargo Colombia operates the following aircraft:

Aircraft	In service	Orders	Notes
Boeing 767-300ER/BCF	4	—	
Boeing 767-300F	2	—	
Total	6	—	

=== Former fleet ===
As of August 2025, LATAM Cargo Colombia operated 9 Boeing 767-300ER(BCF) and 2 Boeing 767-300F.

Aircraft	Total	Introduced	Retired	Notes
Boeing 777F	1	2012	2018	

== See also ==
- LATAM Airlines
- List of airlines of Colombia
