= Aeroexpreso Bogotá =

Airline based in Bogotá, Colombia

AeroExpreso Bogotá
IATA	ICAO	Call sign
-	ABO	AEROEXPRESO
- Founded: 1978
- Ceased operations: 2007
- Hubs: El Dorado International Airport
- Fleet size: 4
- Headquarters: Bogotá, Colombia
- Employees: 59
- Website: www.apsa.com.co

APSA - Aeroexpreso Bogotá was a charter airline based in Bogotá, Colombia. It was established in 1978 and provided air transport, using aircraft and helicopters, mainly for major oil companies. It had 59 employees and its main base was El Dorado International Airport in Bogotá. APSA was liquidated in 2007.

== Fleet ==
APSA consisted of the following aircraft:

- 1 Dornier 228-212
- 1 de Havilland Canada DHC-6 Twin Otter
- 1 Fairchild Metro 23
- 1 Learjet 35A

== See also ==
- List of defunct airlines of Colombia
