= SAEP =

Cargo charter airline of Colombia

SAEP Colombia
IATA	ICAO	Call sign
—	KSP	—
- Founded: May 19, 1980; 46 years ago
- Operating bases: El Dorado International Airport
- Fleet size: 11
- Headquarters: Bogotá, Colombia
- Operating income: ▼ -67.74% (2018)
- Net income: ▲37.08%. (2018)
- Total equity: ▲10.05% (2018)
- Employees: 6

SAEP (Spanish: Servicios Aéreos Especializados en Transportes Petroleros) is a Colombian cargo charter airline that specializes in oil transport. It was founded in 1980, and still operates today from the city of Bogotá.

== History ==
SAEP was founded on May 19, 1980, in the city of Bogotá. Its first aircraft were Douglas DC-3s and then later the company decided to switch to Antonov An-32s.

== See also ==
- List of airlines of Colombia
