= Air Colombia =

Colombian cargo airline (1980–2019)

Coordinates: 4.168637°N 73.615607°W

- Founded: 1980
- Ceased operations: September 23, 2019
- Hubs: La Vanguardia Airport
- Headquarters: Villavicencio, Colombia

Air Colombia S.A.S. was a cargo airline with a hub at La Vanguardia Airport in Villavicencio, Colombia. It was known for being one of several Colombian airlines who continued to use World War II-era Douglas C-47 aircraft into the 2010s. The airline suspended operations after filing for administration on September 23, 2019.

== Fleet ==
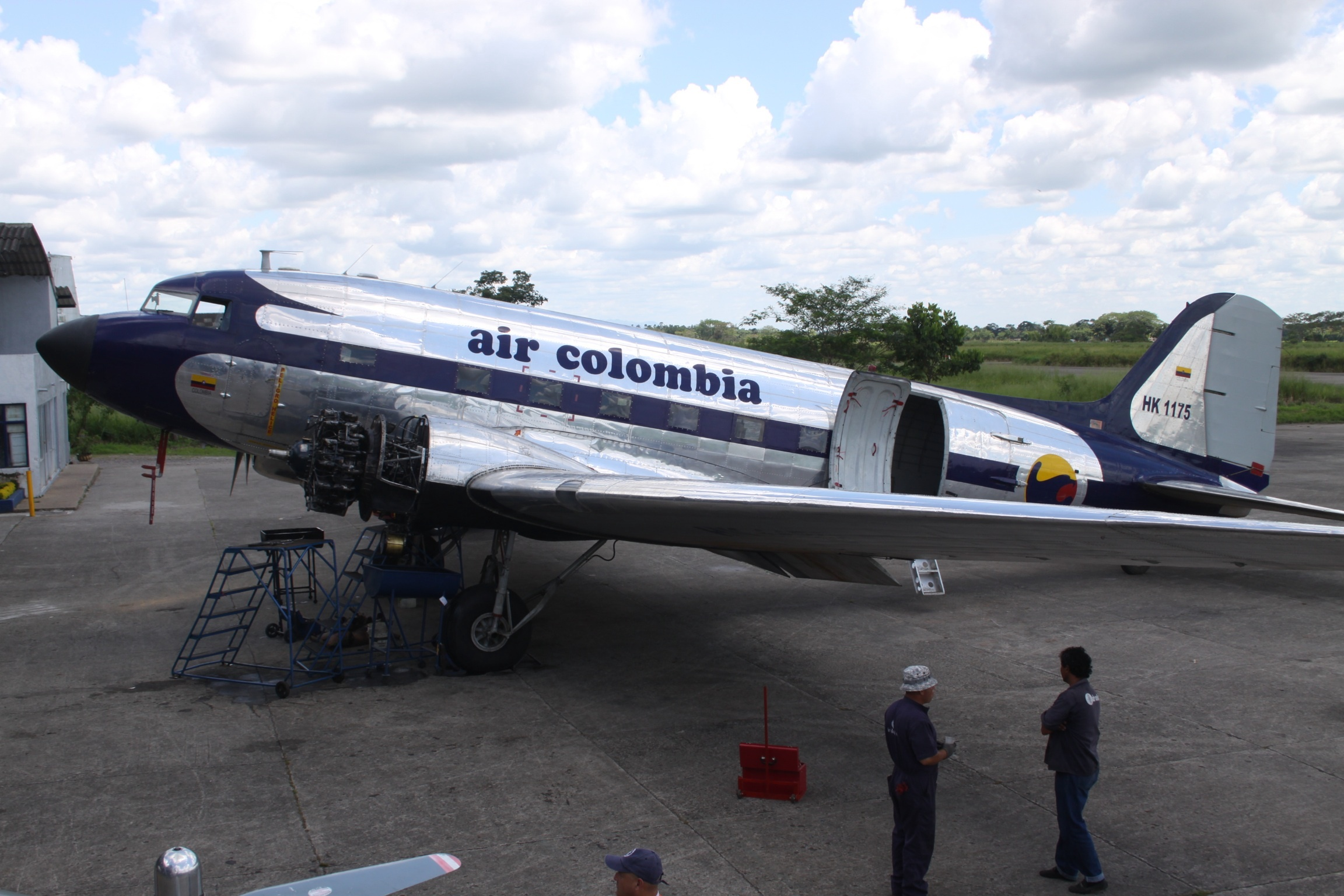
Air Colombia Douglas DC-3

Air Colombia previously operated the following aircraft:

- 1 Antonov An-32B (leased)
- 1 Boeing 727-100F
- 4 Douglas C-47 Skytrain
- 2 Douglas C-118
- 1 Short SC.7 Skyvan

== See also ==
- List of defunct airlines of Colombia
