= Elbee Airlines =

Indian all-cargo airline

IATA	ICAO	Call sign
LBE	-	-
- Founded: 1994; 32 years ago
- Commenced operations: 1995; 31 years ago
- Ceased operations: 1 July 1998; 27 years ago
- Fleet size: 3
- Parent company: Elbee Services
- Headquarters: Mumbai, India

Elbee Airlines was India's first all-cargo airline based in Mumbai, India. Elbee Airlines was started as a wholly owned subsidiary of Elbee Services, one of India's largest express logistics company that itself closed down in 2002. It operated domestic cargo services until July 1998. It became operational in June 1995 having acquired an air-taxi-operator's certificate from the Directorate General of Civil Aviation to operate four Fokkers on domestic routes. The Airline planned a 57 million dollar fleet renewal in 1996, by bringing in three Boeing 727 and three McDonnell Douglas DC-10 freighters to add to its three Fokker F27s. After its freighter Fokker 27 crashed in 1997, business never returned to normalcy and the airline ceased operations by July 1998. Elbee Services ended up writing off their entire investment in the aircraft, amounting to Rs 17 crore.

== Destinations ==
Elbee operated freight services to the following destinations:

India

- Delhi - Indira Gandhi International Airport
- Bengaluru - Bengaluru International Airport
- Mumbai - Chhatrapati Shivaji International Airport base
- Chennai - Chennai International Airport

== Fleet ==
The fleet consisted of three Fokker 27 turboprop aircraft (in cargo configuration).

Registration	From	To
VT-SSA	Busy Bee	Crashed off the coast of Mumbai in 1997
VT-SSB	Busy Bee	Stored at Chennai Airport.
VT-SSC	Busy Bee	Scrapped at Mumbai Airport in 2007

== Accidents and incidents ==
VT-SSA, operating cargo flight on the Mumbai-Bangalore sector, crashed into the Arabian Sea off the Coast of Mumbai on 3 July 1997. The aircraft was destroyed on impact and both crew members died. Severe weather conditions encountered soon after take-off were said to be responsible for the accident.
