= Arca Colombia =

Colombian airline, 1956–1997

ARCA Colombia
IATA	ICAO	Call sign
ZU	AKC	ARCA
- Founded: 1956
- Ceased operations: 1997
- Hubs: La Vanguardia Airport
- Focus cities: Miami International Airport
- Fleet size: 17
- Destinations: 10
- Headquarters: Villavicencio, Colombia
- Founder: Captain Hernando Pote Gutiérrez

ARCA (legally Arca Aerovías Colombianas Ltda) was a Colombian cargo airline company founded in 1956 and ceased operations in 1997. The company was based in La Vanguardia Airport, Villavicencio.

== History ==
=== Foundation ===
ARCA was founded in 1956 at the initiative of Captain Hernando Pote Gutiérrez, who withdrew from Avianca due to disagreements with the head of the company, Martín del Corral. Captain Gutierrez wanted to create a passenger company and compete with Avianca by acquiring the first aircraft, two Douglas DC-3 for passenger transports belonging to a company called Tacata. The first and only regular route that Arca managed to operate was Bogotá-Cúcuta for a value of 42 pesos per ticket. A great advertising campaign was made, which announced the new rate.

Under pressure from Avianca, Lloyd, and Taxader, the Special Administrative Unit of Civil Aeronautics (SAUCA) cancelled Arca's passenger routes in the 1960s; Then, it had no choice but to operate only cargo from La Vanguardia Airport. Some time later the base of operations was transferred to the El Dorado airport in Bogotá. During that decade, Arca operated with 5 Douglas DC-3. The cargo operation connected Bogotá mainly with a large part of the Eastern Plains, joined by Curtiss C-46 HK-1322.

=== Success in the 1970s ===
At the beginning of the 1970s, some of the DC-3s were sold to Aerosucre, Laos and Alianza, all of them cargo operators at the La Vanguardia Airport, while the permit to start operating the route was processed before the SAUCA Charge to Miami. In 1973, SAUCA authorized ARCA the cargo operation to Miami International Airport from Bogotá, this was done on an intermediate scale in Barranquilla in the newly acquired Douglas DC-6B. Thus, ARCA entered into strong competition with Avinca, Aerocosta, and Aerocóndor Colombia on the cargo route to Miami. Arca was part of the Big Four airlines of Colombia at that time and was highly considered among other airlines, at that point in the mid-70s it was the peak of its success.

In 1975, ARCA entered the jet era by leasing a Boeing 707-120F, with a wide cargo door to transport flowers and perishable products between Bogotá and Miami, mainly, a route that the SAUCA had approved. The 707 previously belonged to the Swiss cargo Phoenix Air, which retained some emblems during its short operation in Arca. In 1977 the company achieved sufficient financial capacity to acquire its first Douglas DC-8-43 (registered as HK-1854), through Alitalia, to increase cargo operations between Bogotá and Miami. This would be the first DC-8 operated in Colombia; In addition, he introduced the new image of the following Arca aircraft, preserving the colors of the Italian airline. The particular thing about this aircraft was that it had no loading door, so loading and unloading operations took a long time.

=== Douglas aircraft in the fleet ===
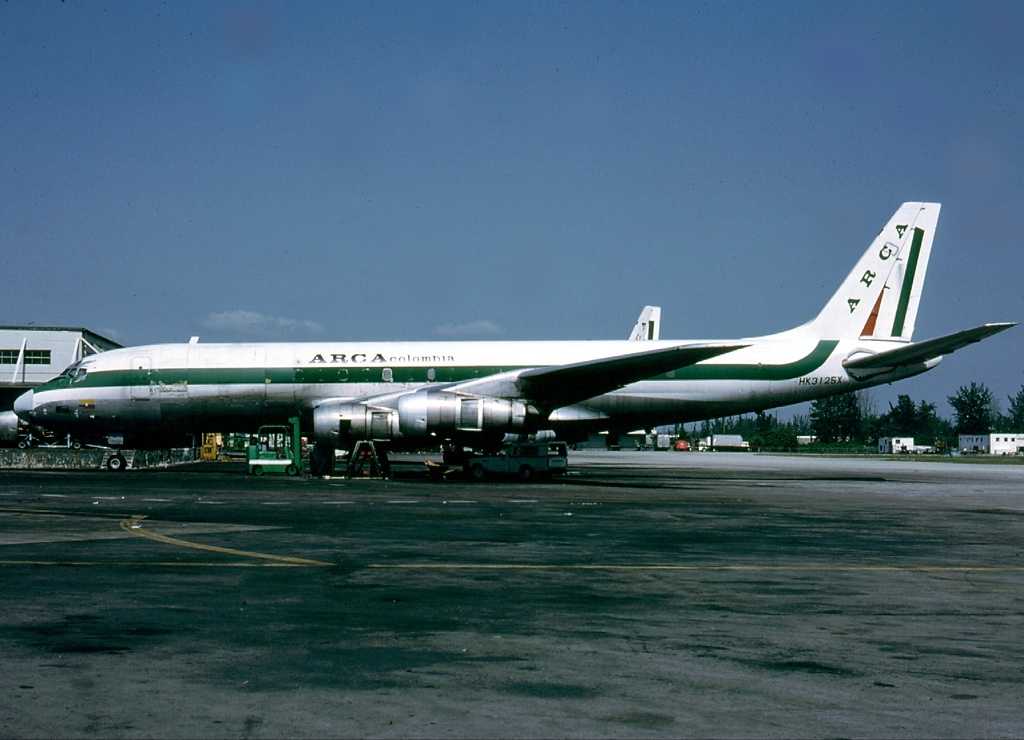
Douglas DC-8-53(F) of ARCA Colombia at Miami International Airport

At that time, ARCA became the first Colombian cargo airline to fly the DC-8 to Miami. In addition, they bought a simulator, installed in the former loading area at Miami. ARCA was characterized from then, until it ceased operations, for having two DC-8s operating simultaneously. Other cities were included in cargo operations from Miami, such as Cali, Cartagena, Medellín, Barranquilla, San Andrés, and Bucaramanga, when there was demand. In January 1981, the first DC-8-50F with a wide cargo door, HK-2587-X, was acquired from Braniff.

With the acquisition of new DC-8s, the kind of cargo brought from Miami began to vary, transporting cars, spare parts, and, in some cases, horses. By the beginning of that decade, ARCA closed a temporary contract with Air France to bring cargo from Martinique. In mid-1981, they acquired a Douglas DC-8 on a lease, through F.A. Conner, whose license plate was N53CA, which operated for a few weeks. By the beginning of 1982, the second Douglas DC-8-50F arrived with a wide cargo door, HK-2667-X, previously operated by Japan Airlines, which is why it was known among Arca's crew as Japanese.

=== Minor troubles ===
At that time, the itinerary of the Arca flights with flowers and other perishable items was scheduled to leave Bogotá at dawn to arrive in Miami early in the morning. The aircraft was unloaded and was ready before noon to return to Colombia. In mid-1982, Douglas DC-8 HK-2587-X suffered an accident arriving at Cali from Miami, leaving the runway due to a hydraulic failure and loss of nosewheel steering, a factor aggravated by the wet runway. The break at the airport lasted for three days, while the aircraft was removed and the runway cleared. The aircraft returned to operations after repair.

=== 1980s ===
In the early 80s, the arrival from Miami at Olaya Herrera Airport, Medellín was sometimes considered a feat of the pilots. Since the aircraft arrived with full cargo on most flights and was occasionally overloaded. Sometimes, after landing, the aircraft's tires deflated on the platform because of a safety valve that overheated due to the intensive braking that was needed to stop the aircraft. In addition, only runway 19 was available to land for this aircraft, even with tailwind. This slowed down all flights at Olaya Herrera Airport and made the mechanics' jobs much easier if no flights were going out.

During the 1980s, ARCA initiated operating agreements with the Ecuadorian cargo airline ANDES, thus a Douglas DC-8, HK-2667X, was leased to it and shared flights to the Old Mariscal Sucre International Airport in Quito from Miami and Colombia. By the end of that decade, an additional Douglas DC-8 was acquired.

=== 1990s ===
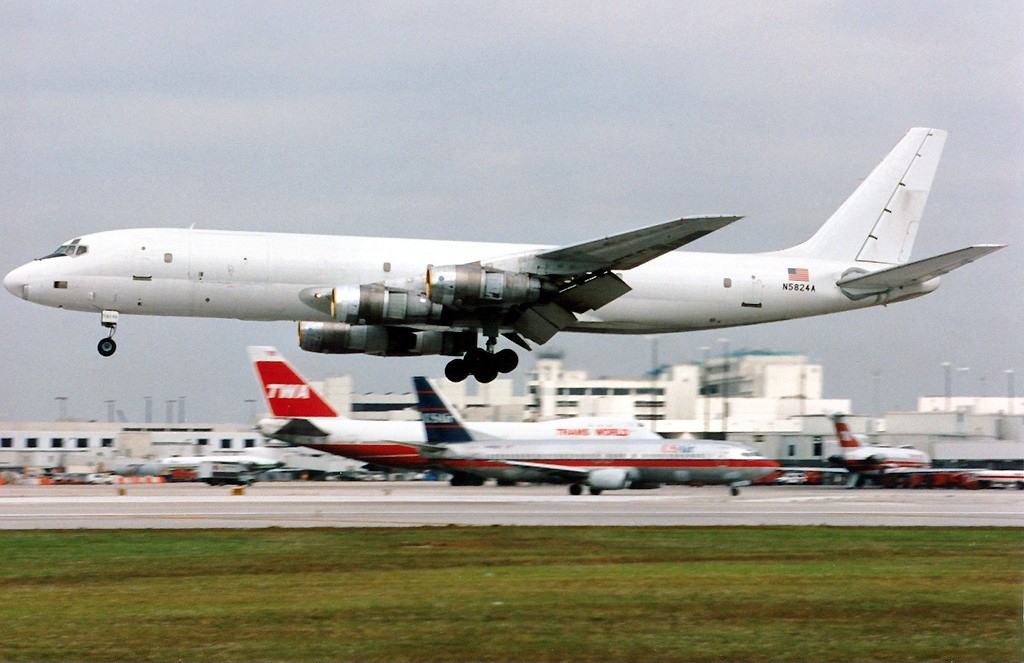
Douglas DC-8-55F of ARCA at Miami International Airport in 1994

At the beginning of the 1990s, after having signed the Open Skies Agreement of the Andean Pact, especially with Venezuela, ARCA processed before the SAUCA the authorization to transport passengers between Cartagena and Miami with seven weekly frequencies in Douglas DC-8 aircraft for 180 passengers for $279, about half of what an ordinary ticket cost; He also requested permission to fly the Bogotá-Cartagena, Cartagena-Medellín, and Cartagena-Cali routes with passengers. Arca's request was supported by the National Tourism Corporation (NTC). At the public hearing, his representative, Luis Baldión, said that the request was presented that the entity supported the initiative that tends to make tourism an industry. Dozens of Colombians in Miami joined their voice to call to break the monopoly and lower airfares between the United States and Colombia. In the Colombia la Grande radio program, broadcast by WRHC, calls were received from the public to support ARCA, who also sent his signatures of support to the head of the SAUCA at that time, José Joaquín Palacio Campuzano. Days after studying the petition, the SAUCA denied Arca the approval of these routes. The decision adopted was based on the recommendation of the Higher Aeronautical Council, which considered it inconvenient for the company, to operate cargo, to move passengers, in particular on the most important routes for the country.

After knowing the refusal of the SAUCA, Captain Gutierrez founded the airline in Venezuela and taking advantage of the bilateral agreement within the framework of the Andean Pact, he began operating with passenger routes between different cities of Colombia and Miami via Maracaibo with DC-8 equipment at really cheaper prices. In 1992, one of the last Douglas DC-8-50F operated by the airline, the N5842A, was acquired on leasing. In June 1993, a stowaway boy, Guillermo Rosales, age 13, was found alive on the landing gear of a DC-8 at Miami Airport, at 2 a.m., on a flight from Bogotá. The fact astonished doctors and aviation experts since the boy survived the extreme conditions of temperature and lack of oxygen.

The 90s would mark a crisis not only for ARCA but for all Colombian freight airlines, because of several circumstances combined against the airline industry in the country. The main one was drug trafficking, a ballast that a large investment in security, regulated by the FAA, was required to combat, to operate in the United States, in addition to the noise restriction, which forced Stage I and hush kits to be adopted, which would increase the unforeseen expenses that the airlines had to make in their DC-8s, in addition to the decertification that the country suffered due to the Samper government scandal. By mid-1994, one of the Douglas DC-8, HK-3125-X, ended its useful life and was grounded. Contacts were made to lease a McDonnell Douglas DC-10-10F, but the transaction was canceled. During the following years, it was increasingly difficult to continue loading operations; FAA pressure became increasingly rigorous while the tough competition of international freight airlines made the operation less profitable.

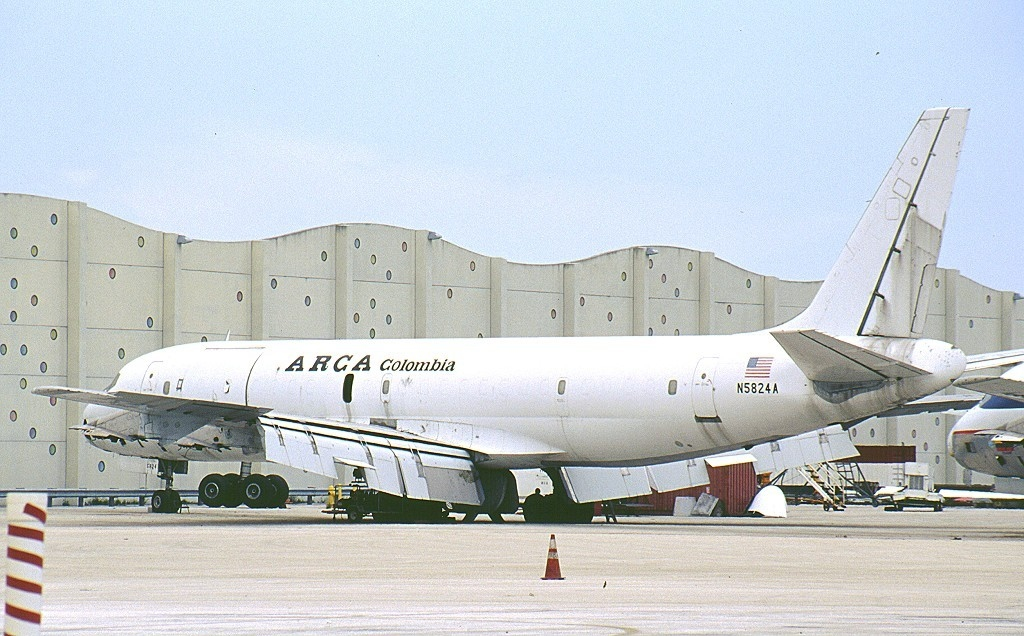
Douglas DC-8-55F stored at the "Corrosion Corner" of Miami International Airport in 2001

On January 24, 1997, ARCA was intervened by the SAUCA. The director of the entity, Abel Enrique Jiménez, and the head of the Office of Control and Security, Captain Germán Duarte, said that in the process of inspection, they had to paralyze the operation they had been carrying out the aircraft of the company because they did not meet the requirements to fly to the United States. So the company was under fire for having not completed the aircraft inspection and the company's financial status. The immobilization of each DC-8 represented for the company a 50% decrease in its revenues and by the beginning of 1996, the SAUCA was lowered by the FAA to category two, for not exercising an adequate inspection on the airlines.

By mid-1997, the FAA fined ARCA with a sum of $68,000, for not complying with a maintenance plan. According to the FAA, ARCA made a series of flights on the Douglas DC-8-55F between June 1992 and August 1993 without a necessary ventilation system for the main cargo door within a stipulated period. These decisions, the lack of government support, and decertification were events that unfortunately marked the company's closure. Its three DC-8s, HK-2587X, HK-3746X, and N5824A were immobilized at Miami and then scrapped at the end of the decade in the airport's sector known as the "Corrosion Corner".

== Destinations ==
ARCA served to the following destinations:

Colombia

- Barranquilla (Ernesto Cortissoz International Airport)
- Bogotá (El Dorado International Airport)
- Bucaramanga (Palonegro International Airport)
- Cali (Alfonso Bonilla Aragón International Airport)
- Medellín (José María Córdova International Airport)
- San Andrés (Gustavo Rojas Pinilla International Airport)
- Villavicencio (La Vanguardia Airport) Hub

Ecuador

- Quito (Old Mariscal Sucre International Airport)

Martinique

- Fort-de-France (Martinique Aimé Césaire International Airport)

United States

- Miami (Miami International Airport) Focus city

== Fleet ==
ARCA Colombia used throughout the years the following aircraft:

- 1 Boeing 707-120F
- 1 Curtiss C-46 Commando
- 5 Douglas DC-3
- 1 Douglas DC-6B
- 2 Douglas DC-8-43
- 1 Douglas DC-8-51F
- 2 Douglas DC-8-53F
- 3 Douglas DC-8-54CF
- 1 Douglas DC-8-55CF

== See also ==
- La Vanguardia Airport
- List of defunct airlines of Colombia
