= Líneas Aéreas Suramericanas =

Cargo airline of Colombia (1972–2023)

Líneas Aéreas Suramericanas LAS Cargo

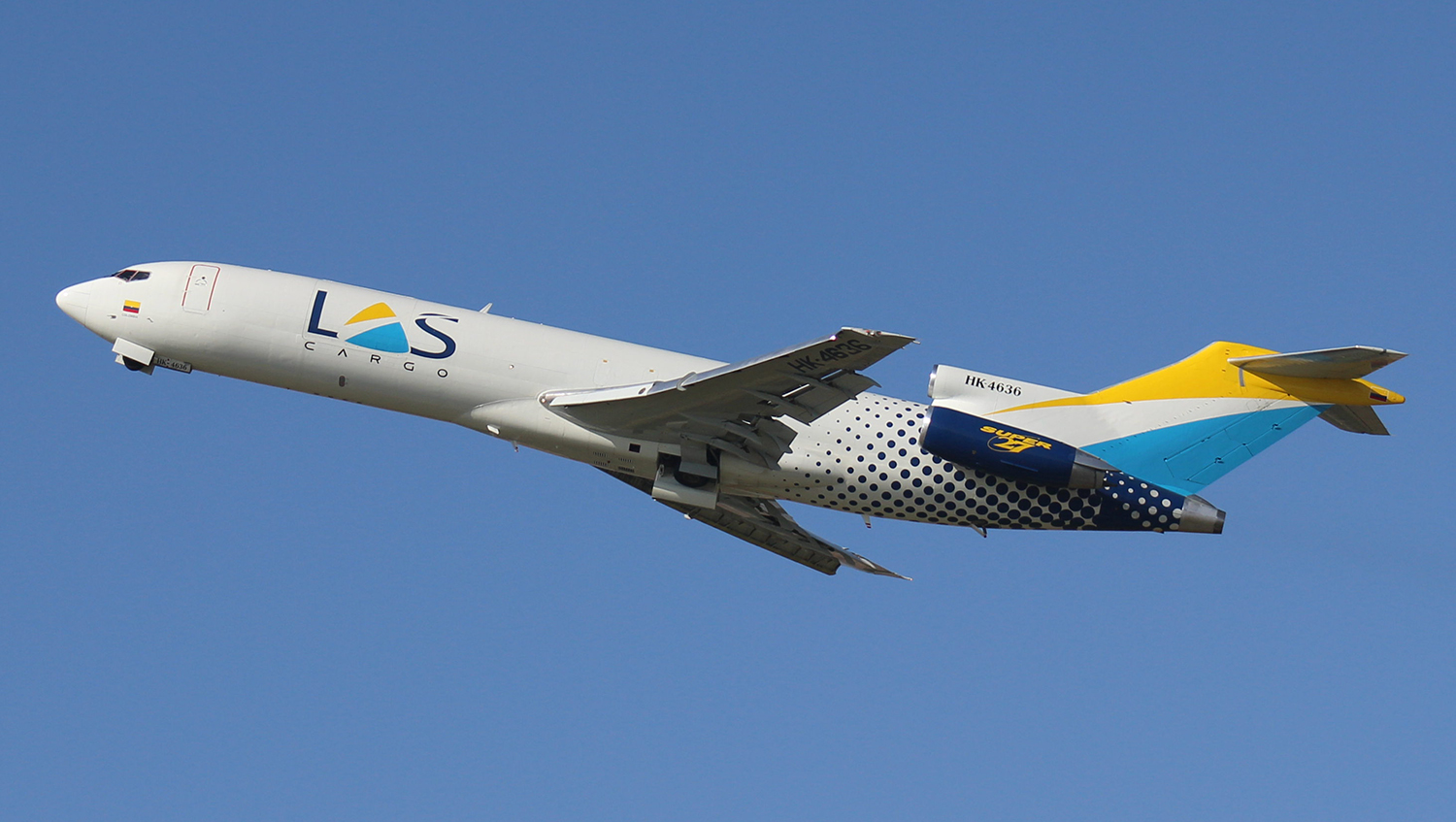
IATA	ICAO	Call sign
4L	LAU	SURAMERICANO
- Founded: April 14, 1972 (as AeroNorte)
- Ceased operations: September 30, 2023
- AOC #: QQLF316F
- Hubs: El Dorado International Airport
- Destinations: 8
- Headquarters: Bogotá, Colombia
- Key people: Maurice Thorin Brauer (CEO)
- Website: www.lascargo.co (inactive)

Líneas Aéreas Suramericanas S.A.S (traded as LAS Cargo) was a cargo airline based in Bogotá, Colombia. It operated scheduled and chartered cargo flights to Latin America and the Caribbean. Its main base was El Dorado International Airport, Bogotá.

== History ==
The airline was founded on April 14, 1972, as AeroNorte Ltda. and commenced operations using the Curtiss C-46 Commando. In 1975, it started regional cargo services and bought 2 Douglas DC-4 and 2 Douglas DC-6A.

The company changed its name in 1986 to Líneas Aéreas Suramericanas when its operation's certificate was canceled by Law 30. Operations started serving North America with a Canadair CL-44. In 1987, it started flying between Bogotá and Panama, when a Sud Aviation Caravelle joined the fleet.

In 1991, the first Boeing 727-100 was acquired. To complement the fleet, two McDonnell Douglas DC-9-15 freighters were added for greater national coverage.

By 2005, the company had built its own two hangars and purchased its fourth Boeing 727-200, and by the end of 2008, two more joined the fleet. Additionally, LAS Cargo constructed two big hangars at El Dorado International Airport. They include four aircraft parking positions, structural repairs, mods, engineering services, and aircraft painting facilities.

The company became an International Air Transport Association member in 2013. The company updated its corporate image in 2014, including a new logo and a new livery design for its aircraft.

In 2019, a Boeing 737-300SF was introduced to the fleet, and in December 2021, a 737-400SF was added.

By July 2023, the company had debts of 17m US Dollars and had to cease all operational activities with its remaining single Boeing 737-400SF for financial reasons. However, the company went into restructuring under Law 1116 (similar to US Chapter 11) and was put up for sale.

== Destinations ==
As of May 2022, LAS Cargo served the following destinations:

Country	City	Airport	Notes
Aruba	Oranjestad	Queen Beatrix International Airport	
Colombia	Bogotá	El Dorado International Airport	Hub
Curaçao	Willemstad	Curaçao International Airport	
Ecuador	Guayaquil	José Joaquín de Olmedo International	
Ecuador	Quito	Mariscal Sucre International Airport	
Panama	Panama City	Tocumen International Airport	
Perú	Lima	Jorge Chávez International Airport	
Venezuela	Caracas	Simón Bolívar International Airport	

LAS Cargo also operated charter flights internationally and within Colombia.

== Fleet ==
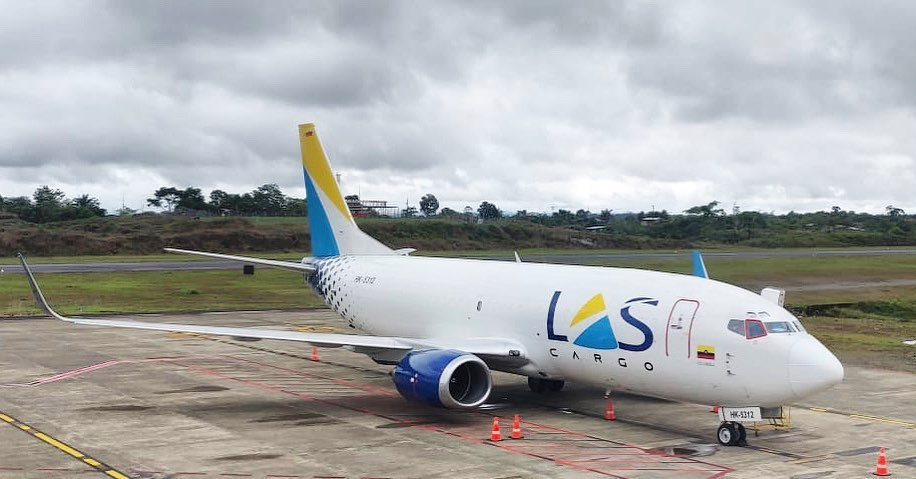
A Boeing 737-300SF LAS Cargo

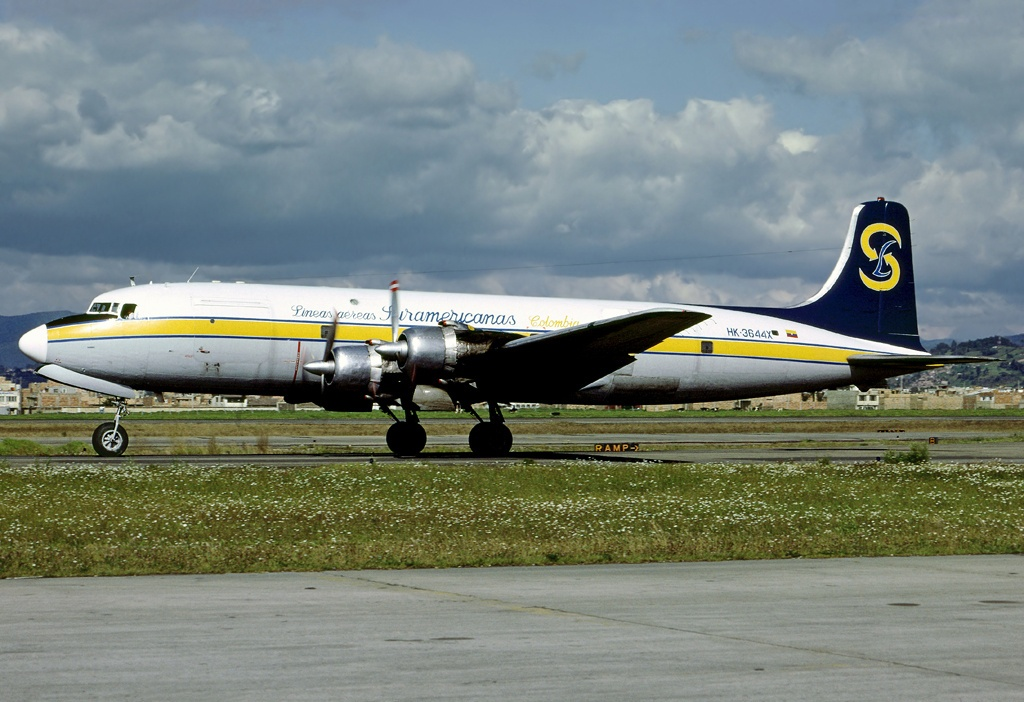
A former Douglas DC-6B LAS Cargo

The airline previously operated the following aircraft:

Aircraft	Total	Introduced	Retired	Notes
Boeing 727-100F	5	1993	2020	
Boeing 727-200F	5	2002	2023	
Boeing 737-300SF	1	2019	2022	
Boeing 737-400SF	1	2021	2023	
Canadair CL-44	1	1984	1988	Crashed after an engine failure.
Curtiss C-46 Commando	6	1972	1993	
Douglas C-47 Skytrain	2	1976	1980	
Douglas C-54 Skymaster	3	1972	1988	
Douglas DC-6	4	1982	1999	
Douglas DC-7	1	1972	1973	Written off when refueling.
Douglas DC-9-15F	2	2002	2008	
Sud Aviation Caravelle	7	1983	2002	

== Accidents and incidents ==
- On December 11, 1991, a Curtiss C-46 Commando (registration HK-2716), was flown into a hill during the approach to El Dorado International Airport. All 8 occupants were killed.
- On January 31, 2001, a Sud Aviation Caravelle crashed near El Alcaraván Airport while attempting to make an emergency landing. Three of the six occupants were killed.
- On December 18, 2003, LAS Flight 4246, a Douglas DC-9-15F (registered HK-4246X), crashed near Mitú, killing all 3 occupants on board.
- On May 28, 2018, a Boeing 727-200F (registered HK-4637) suffered a hard landing at El Dorado International Airport, causing the nosegear to collapse during touchdown. All 5 crew members were uninjured, and the aircraft was repaired.
- On October 20, 2020, the same 727 from before, HK-4637, veered off the runway of Arturo Michelena International Airport during landing. The aircraft's landing gear was damaged on due to wet grass. All 3 crew members were uninjured, and the aircraft was repaired again after.

== See also ==
- List of airlines of Colombia
