= Express Air Cargo =

Tunisian airline

IATA	ICAO	Call sign
7A	XRC	TUNISIA CARGO
- Founded: 2015
- Hubs: Tunis-Carthage International Airport
- Fleet size: 3
- Headquarters: Tunis, Tunisia
- Website: http://express-aircargo.com/en/

Express Air Cargo is an airline based in Tunis, Tunisia that was founded in 2015.

== Fleet ==
As of August 2025, Express Air Cargo operates the following aircraft:

Express Air Cargo fleet
Aircraft	In fleet	Orders	Notes
Boeing 737-300QC	1	—	TS-ICA
Boeing 737-300SF	1	—	TS-ICB
Boeing 737-800SF	1	—	TS-ICD
Total	3		
