= LATAM Cargo Brasil =

Brazilian cargo airline

IATA	ICAO	Call sign
M3	LTG	TAMCARGO
- Founded: 2 June 1995; 31 years ago
- AOC #: 9,429 - October 5, 2022
- Hubs: Viracopos International Airport
- Fleet size: 2
- Destinations: 18
- Parent company: LATAM Airlines Group (74%)
- Headquarters: Campinas, Brazil
- Key people: Norberto M. Jochmann (President)
- Employees: 285 (2007)
- Website: www.latamcargo.com

ABSA Aerolinhas Brasileiras S/A d/b/a LATAM Cargo Brasil (formerly TAM Cargo) is a cargo airline based in Campinas, Brazil. It operates scheduled services within Latin America and between Brazil and the United States as well as charter services. Its main base is Viracopos International Airport.

It is a sister company of LATAM Cargo Chile and LATAM Cargo Colombia.

== History ==
The airline was established and started operations on June 2, 1995, as Brasil Transair - Transportes Charter Turismo.

In November 2001, LAN Airlines acquired a majority stake of the company, which was then renamed ABSA Cargo Airline and integrated into the LAN Chile Group. ABSA Cargo put its first Boeing 767-300F into service in January 2002. It is owned by LAN Airlines (74%), Jochmann (13%) and TADEF (13%) and had 285 employees as of March 2007.

On August 1, 2012, ABSA began trading as TAM Cargo after the absorption of TAM Linhas Aéreas by its parent LAN to form the LATAM Airlines Group. In May 2016, it has been rebranded to the current LATAM Cargo Brasil in line with LATAM Cargo Chile, the former LAN Cargo.

On 26 May 2020, LATAM filed for Chapter 11 bankruptcy in the United States due to economic problems attributed to the impact of the COVID-19 pandemic on aviation, although they are currently operating and have been negotiating terms. In August, the company announced its second-quarter results, projecting improved operational prospects.

== Destinations ==
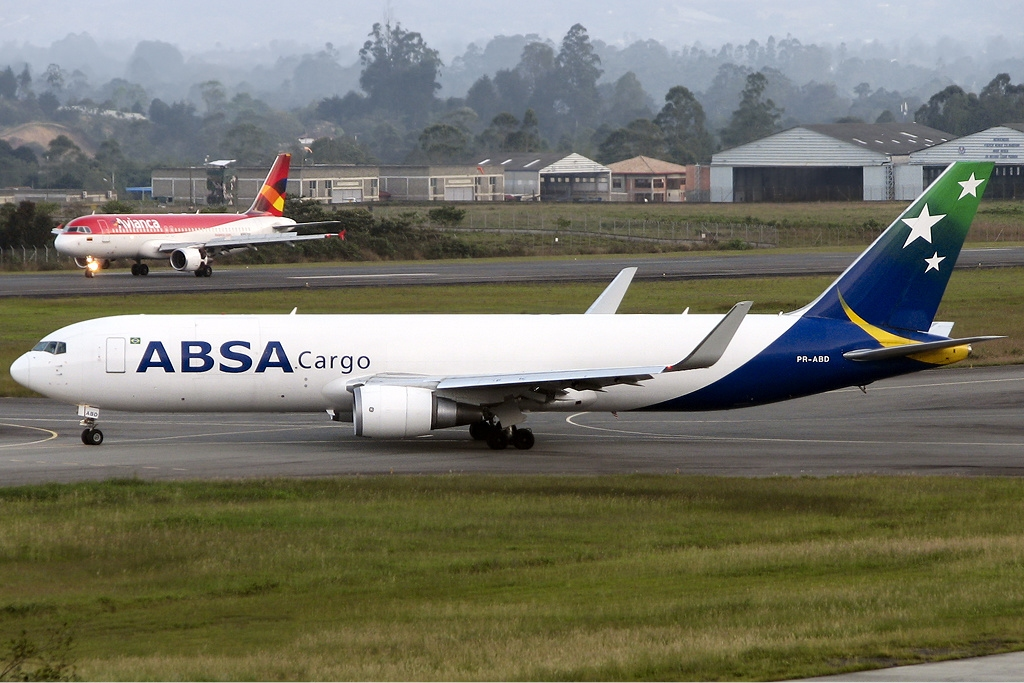
A former ABSA Cargo Boeing 767-300F at José María Córdova International Airport in 2011

LATAM Cargo Brasil serves the following:

Country	City	Airport	Notes	Refs
Argentina	Buenos Aires	Ministro Pistarini International Airport		
Argentina	Tucumán	Teniente General Benjamín Matienzo International Airport	Seasonal	
Brazil	Belo Horizonte	Belo Horizonte International Airport		
Brazil	Brasília	Brasília International Airport		
Brazil	Cabo Frio	Cabo Frio International Airport		
Brazil	Campinas	Viracopos International Airport	Hub	
Brazil	Porto Alegre	Salgado Filho International Airport		
Brazil	Recife	Recife/Guararapes–Gilberto Freyre International Airport		
Brazil	Rio de Janeiro	Rio de Janeiro/Galeão International Airport		
Brazil	Salvador	Salvador International Airport		
Brazil	São Paulo	São Paulo/Guarulhos International Airport		
Brazil	Vitória	Eurico de Aguiar Salles Airport		
Colombia	Medellín	José María Córdova International Airport		
Costa Rica	San José	Juan Santamaría International Airport		
Denmark	Copenhagen	Copenhagen Airport		
Ecuador	Quito	Mariscal Sucre International Airport		
Germany	Frankfurt	Frankfurt Airport		
Mexico	Mexico City	Mexico City International Airport		
Paraguay	Asunción	Silvio Pettirossi International Airport		
Peru	Lima	Jorge Chávez International Airport		
Turkey	Istanbul	Istanbul Airport		
United States	Huntsville	Huntsville International Airport		
United States	Miami	Miami International Airport		

== Fleet ==
=== Current fleet ===
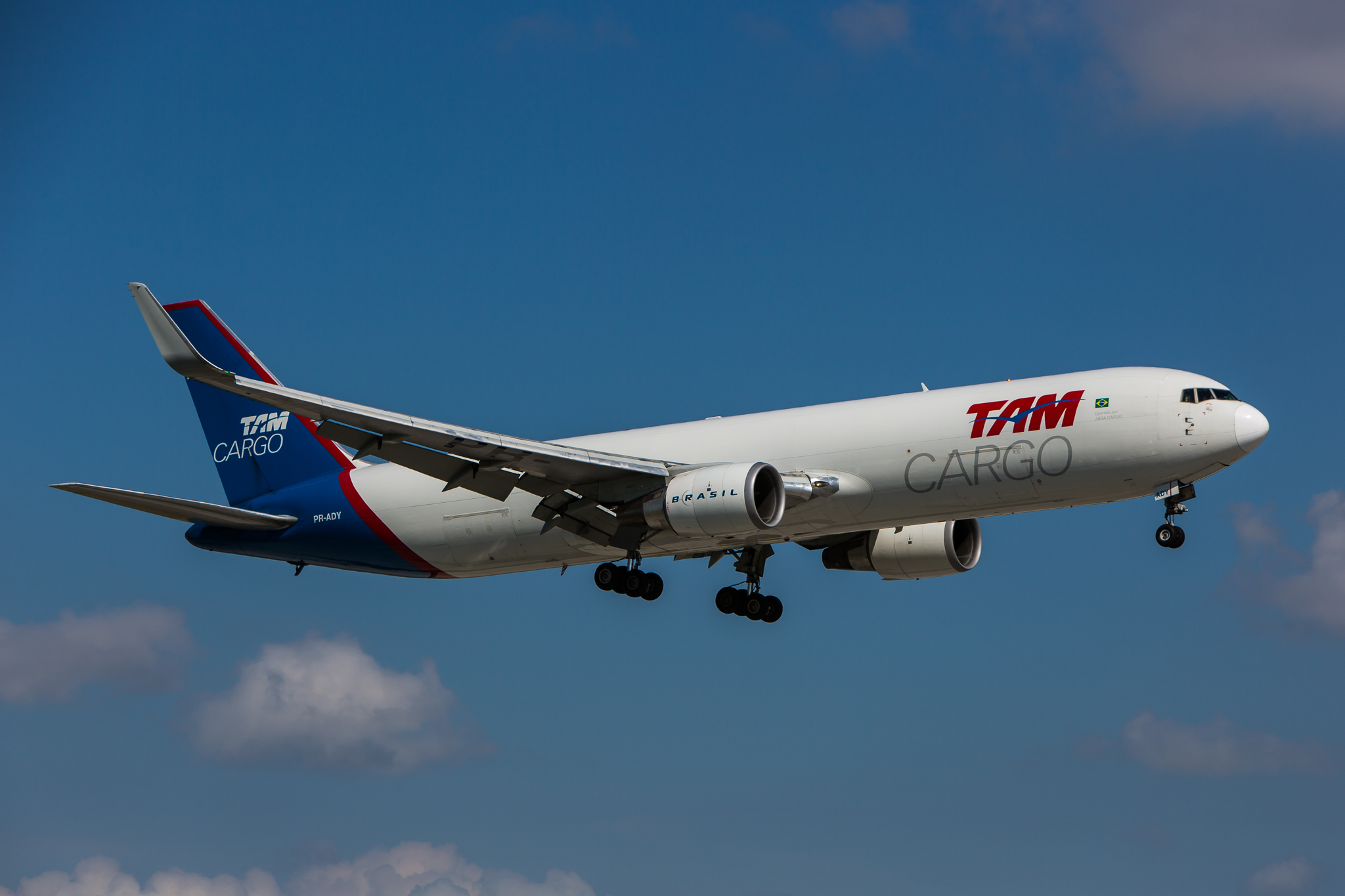
A LATAM Cargo Brasil Boeing 767-300F in former TAM Cargo livery

As of August 2025, LATAM Cargo Brasil operates the following aircraft:

LATAM Cargo Brasil fleet
Aircraft	In service	Orders	Notes
Boeing 767-300F	2	—	
Total	2	—	

== See also ==
- List of airlines of Brazil
