= SADELCA =

Cargo airline of Colombia

IATA	ICAO	Call sign
—	SDK	SADELCA
- Founded: October 31, 1974; 50 years ago
- Operating bases: El Dorado International Airport
- Fleet size: 3
- Headquarters: Bogotá, Colombia
- Website: www.sadelca.com

SADELCA Ltda. (Spanish acronym: Sociedad Aérea Del Caquetá) is a cargo airline based at El Dorado International Airport in Bogotá, Colombia.

== Fleet ==
=== Current fleet ===
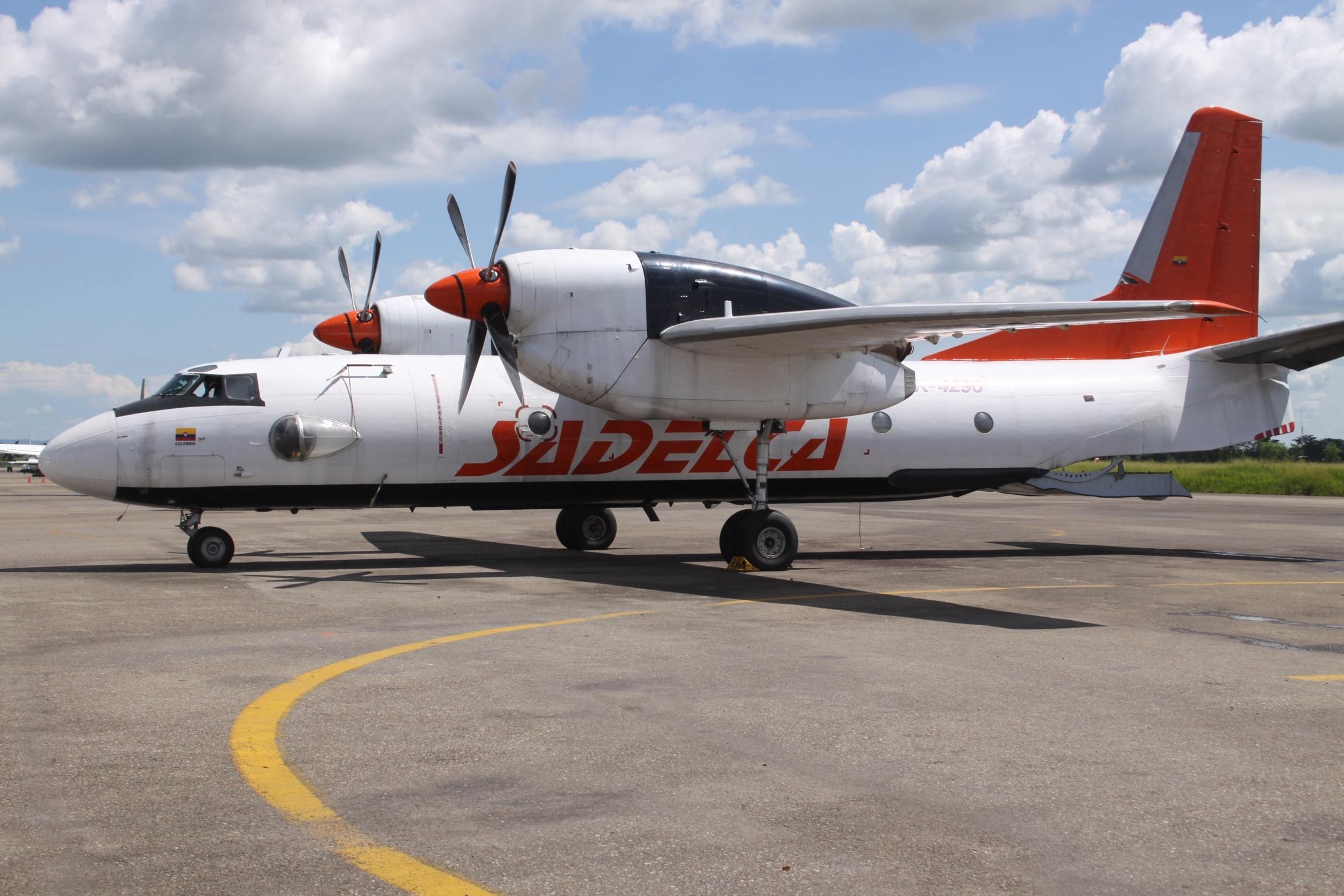
A SADELCA Antonov An-32B

As of May 2024, SADELCA operates the following aircraft:

- 1 Antonov An-26B-100
- 1 Antonov An-32B
- 1 Douglas DC-3D

=== Former fleet ===
SADELCA formerly operated the following aircraft:

- Douglas C-47 Skytrain
- Douglas C-54 Skymaster
- Douglas DC-3C
- Douglas DC-4

== Accidents and incidents ==
- On January 27, 1978, Douglas DC-3D HK-1351 crashed into a mountain at Cerro Granada, Caquetá, Colombia, killing all twelve people on board. The altitude of the crash site is 6,800 feet (2,100 m), and the mountain was obscured by clouds at the time. The aircraft was on a scheduled passenger flight.
- On August 11, 1981, a Douglas DC-4 (HK-136) had to make an emergency landing on the flight from Florencia to Neiva. The machine was damaged beyond repair. No one was harmed.
