= TESIS Aviation Enterprise =

Closed JSC "TESIS" ЗАО «Авиапредприятие «ТЕСИС»
IATA	ICAO	Call sign
UZ	TIS	TESIS
- Founded: November 1992
- Ceased operations: October 2008
- Hubs: Domodedovo International Airport; Irkutsk Airport
- Fleet size: 15
- Headquarters: Moscow, Russia
- Key people: Andrey Aleksandrovich Konstantinov (General Director)
- Website: http://www.tesis.ru/

TESIS Aviation Enterprise was a cargo airline based in Moscow, Russia. It operated domestic and international charter cargo flights from Moscow to destinations including China, India, United Arab Emirates and Turkey. It also flies passenger charters around the world. It was established and started operations in November 1992. Its main bases were Domodedovo International Airport, Moscow and Irkutsk Airport. The Russian aviation authority is suspending flights effective 17 October 2008. The airline has not been taken over by Russian aviation fuel supplier TOAP that has blamed the credit crisis for the failure of the plan. It has then suspended operations with its two remaining B747-200F freighters on October 17, 2008.

== Destinations ==
As of August 2007, TESIS Aviation Enterprise operated scheduled cargo flights to the following destinations:

- China
  - Beijing
  - Nanjing
  - Shenyang
  - Shijiazhuang
  - Tianjin
- Germany
  - Frankfurt-Hahn Airport
  - Leipzig
- Russia
  - Kemerovo
  - Moscow (Sheremetyevo International Airport) base
  - Novosibirsk
  - Saint Petersburg

== Fleet ==
The TESIS fleet consisted of the following aircraft (at August 2006):

- 1 Ilyushin Il-62M
- 9 Ilyushin Il-76TD
- 2 Tupolev Tu-154B
- 3 Boeing 747-200F
