= VASP Flight 233 =

1959 mid-air collision in Brazil

Accident
- Date: 22 December 1959
- Summary: Mid-air collision due to pilot error and route design flaw
- Site: near Galeão International Airport, Rio de Janeiro, Brazil
- Total fatalities: 42
- Total survivors: 1

First aircraft
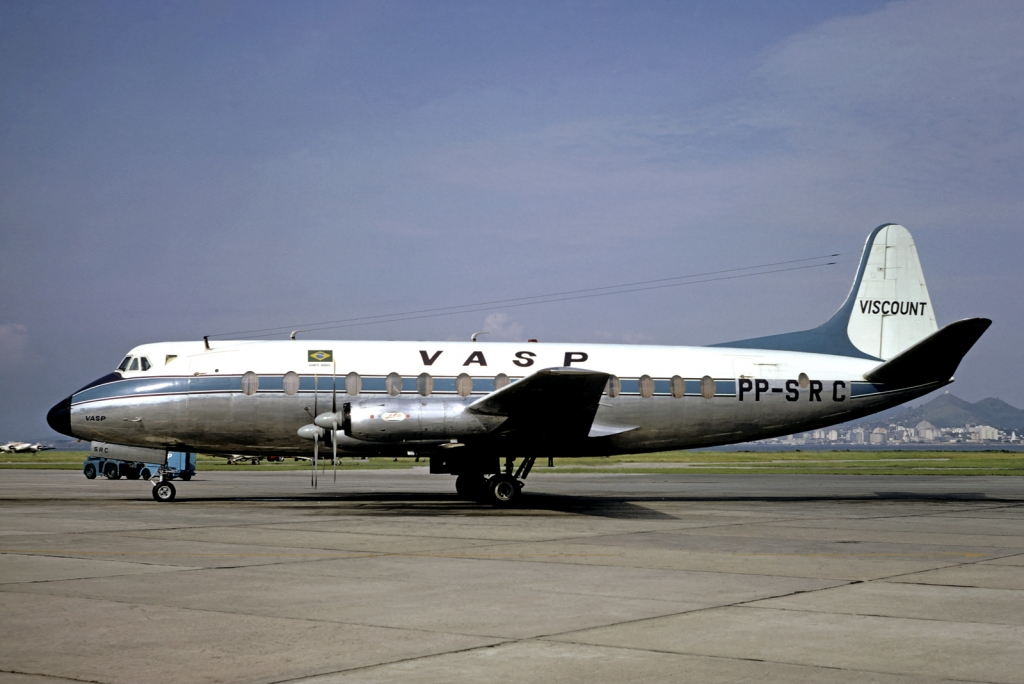
- A Vickers Viscount of VASP similar to the aircraft involved
- Type: Vickers 827 Viscount
- Operator: VASP
- Registration: PP-SRG
- Flight origin: Brasília International Airport, Brasília, Brazil
- 1st stopover: Galeão International Airport, Rio de Janeiro, Brazil
- 2nd stopover: Congonhas Airport, São Paulo, Brazil
- 3rd stopover: Salvador Bahia Airport, Salvador, Bahia, Brazil
- 4th stopover: Recife International Airport, Recife, Brazil
- Destination: Natal International Airport, Natal, Rio Grande do Norte, Brazil
- Occupants: 32
- Passengers: 26
- Crew: 6
- Fatalities: 32
- Survivors: 0

Second aircraft
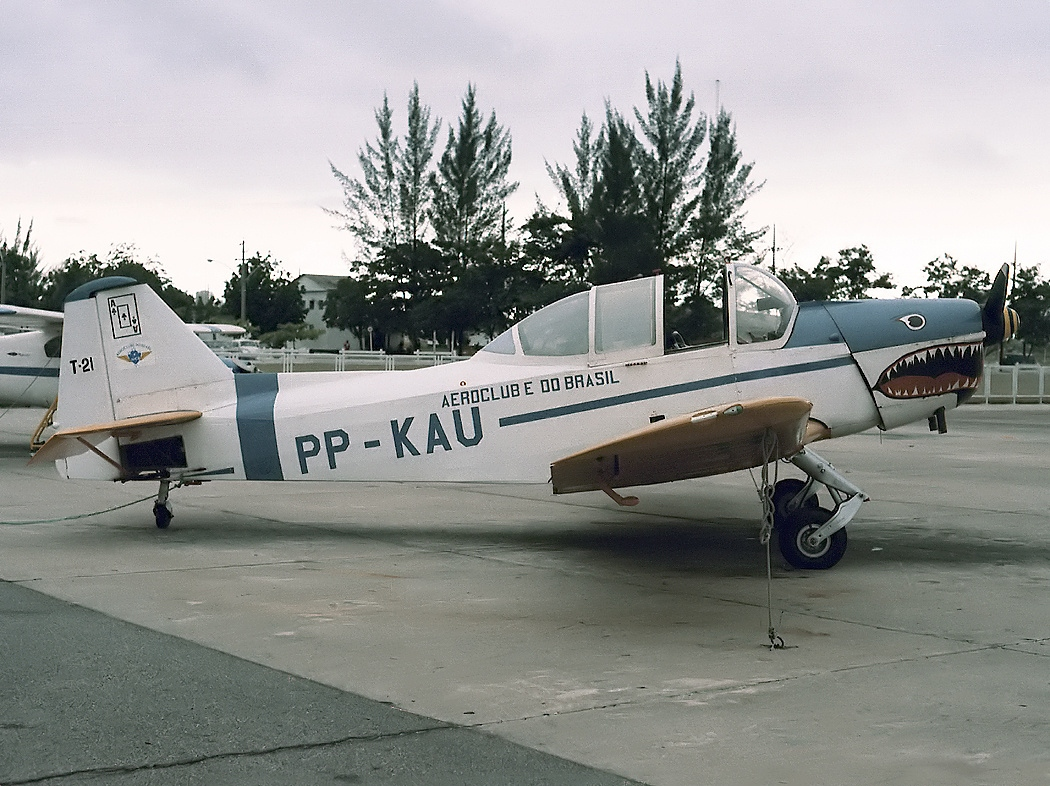
- A Fokker S-11 similar to the one involved
- Type: Fokker S-11
- Operator: Brazilian Air Force
- Registration: 0742
- Flight origin: Campo dos Afonsos, Rio de Janeiro, Brazil
- Destination: Campo dos Afonsos, Rio de Janeiro, Brazil
- Occupants: 1
- Crew: 1
- Fatalities: 0
- Injuries: 1
- Survivors: 1

Ground casualties
- Ground fatalities: 10

VASP Flight 233 was a scheduled domestic passenger flight from Brasilia, Brazil to Natal, Brazil with four stopovers (Rio de Janeiro, São Paulo, Salvador and Recife). On December 22, 1959, during the approach at Galeão International Airport, the plane collided with a Brazilian Air Force's (FAB) Fokker T-21. The Vickers Viscount plummeted into the ground, killing all 32 people on board in addition to 10 on the ground. The T-21 pilot survived by parachuting out.

== Aircraft ==
=== Vickers Viscount 827 - PP-SRG ===
The aircraft involved was manufactured in 1959, and was received by VASP on January 29, 1959 with the registration of PP-SRG. At the time of the accident, it was the newest aircraft in VASP's fleet.

=== Fokker T-21 ===
The other aircraft involved was manufactured in 1959, registered as 0742.

== Accident ==
When the Viscount was about to land at Galeão Airport at 1:40 pm, its left wing was struck and partially torn off by the T-21 - as it just had performed a spin. The T-21 pilot, Eduardo da Silva Pereira, successfully escaped in a parachute just before the aircraft plowed onto a house, causing minor injuries to a woman.

Meanwhile, the Viscount spiraled into the ground despite the crew's efforts. Upon impact, the plane struck into several houses and exploded afterwards. 42 people (26 passengers, 6 crew members, 10 on the ground) perished.

Among the dead were:

- Writer Octávio Tarquínio de Sousa and his wife Lucia Miguel Pereira;
- Economist Benjamin Cabello;
- O Cruzeiro reporter Luciano Carneiro.

== Investigation ==
The Brazilian Air Force and Aeronautical Accidents Investigation and Prevention Center (CENIPA) investigated the tragedy with total confidentiality. It was found that:

- The Fokker T-21 lacked a radio, preventing communication with controllers at Galeão Airport.
- The pilot of the T-21 was inexperienced, having only 19 hours of flight time. He also invaded an airway designed for commercial aviation.
- The improperly located training area caused confusion to the pilots.

However, the investigators concluded that the main cause of the accident was the failure of both pilots to maintain adequate vigilance over other aircraft.

== Aftermath ==
About a year after the accident, Eduardo da Silva Pereira was expelled from the Air Force Academy.

The disaster caused a great commotion in society at the time. The magazine O Cruzeiro began a campaign against the presence of the aeronautical school near Galeão, urging the FAB to send its cadets to a new base planned in Pirassununga, Sao Paulo.

Caneiro was returning from Brasília after reporting on the first debutante ball in the newly inaugurated Federal Capital and was carrying a briefcase containing his camera and negatives. Despite the destruction, the negatives were only slightly damaged and were published as a posthumous tribute.

Because of the accident, the Pirassununga base project came into fruition. The Afonsos Air Force Base still continued its operation with restrictions until 1971

This collision, as well as another that occurred two months later (the 1960 Rio de Janeiro mid-air collision) put the city's air traffic control system to a test.
