= Modern Logistics =

Brazilian airline

| IATA | ICAO | Call sign |
|---|---|---|
| WD | MWM | MODERNAIR |
- Founded: October 2014; 12 years ago
- Commenced operations: July 12, 2017; 9 years ago
- AOC #: 9,933 - December 5, 2022
- Hubs: Viracopos International Airport
- Fleet size: 3
- Destinations: 5 (as of August 2024)
- Headquarters: Jundiaí, Brazil
- Key people: Gerald Blake Lee (Founder); Marlon Ramirez (Founder); Cristiano Koga (CEO); Joice Doutel (COO); Mario Fernandes da Costa (CFO)
- Website: modern.com.br

Modern Transporte Aéreo de Carga or simply Modern Logistics is a Brazilian integrated cargo and logistics airline, established in 2014 and headquartered in Jundiaí, São Paulo. It was founded by executive co-founders of Azul Linhas Aéreas.

== History ==
=== Background ===
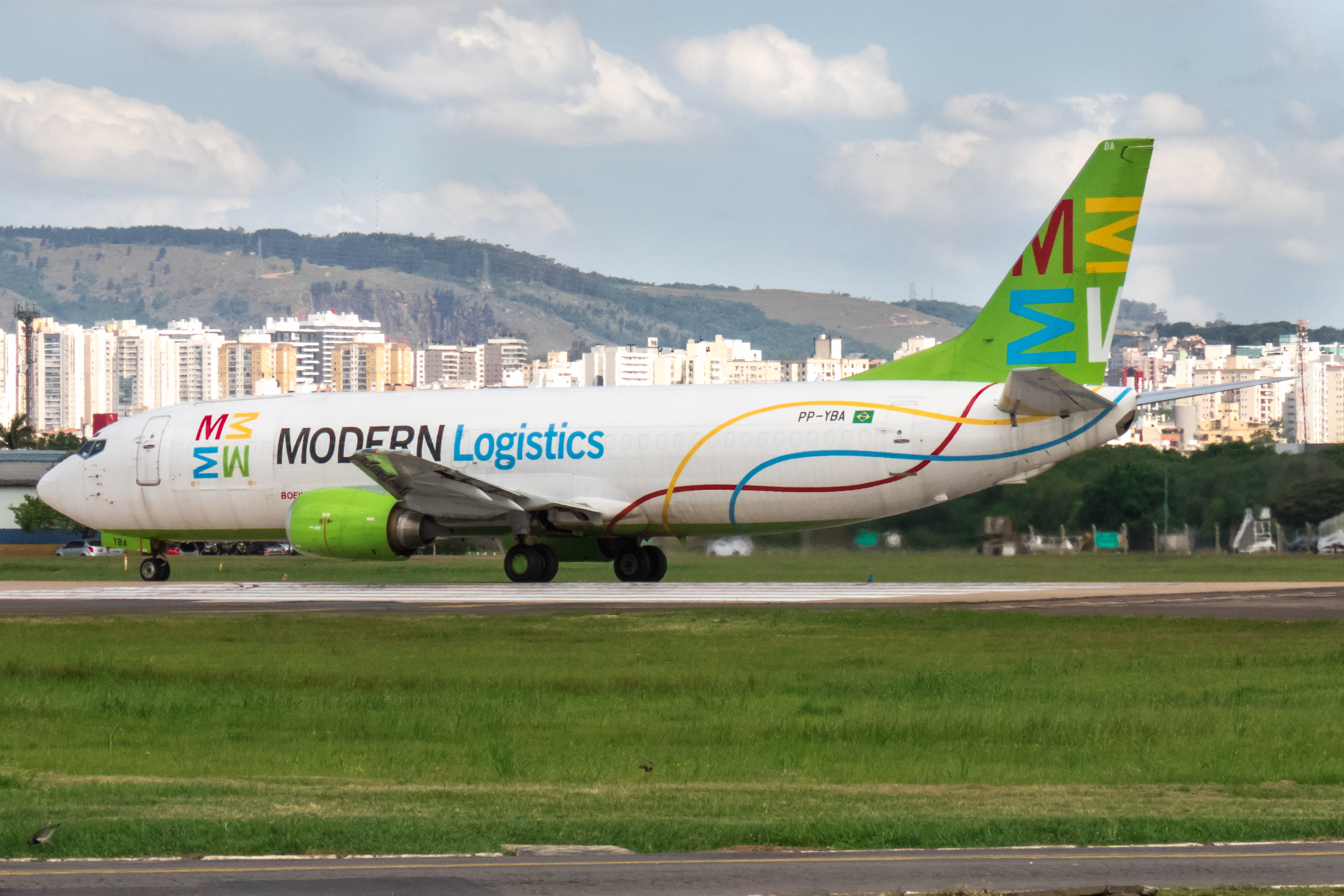
Modern Logistics Boeing 737-400SF reg. PP-YBA taxiing in Porto Alegre

Modern Logistics was effectively founded in 2014 by executives who left their positions on the board of directors of Azul Linhas Aéreas, led by entrepreneurs Gerald Blake Lee and Marlon Ramirez, former members of JetBlue Airways and the first executives sent to Brazil by the Brazilian-American businessman David Neeleman to structure his new airline in 2008. Previously, since mid-2011, they began work to structure the creation of the new airline, with the elaboration of its strategic model, business plan, selection and recruitment of executives, in addition to technical studies on the air cargo transportation sector in the Brazilian market.

=== Establishment (2014-2017) ===
On September 23, 2014, Modern Logistics officially announced its entry into the Brazilian air cargo and logistics market, signaling that it had received an investment of US$75 million (R$375 million) from local and foreign investors for the hiring of employees, leasing of two Boeing 737 Classic cargo aircraft and warehouses, in addition to the acquisition of equipment and also as working capital. The intention of the new airline was to connect the country's main industrial hubs with a fleet of its own cargo aircraft and through a network of partner land transport companies such as Transportadora Americana, Braspress Transportes Urgentes, Jadlog Logística, Atlas, Termaco Logística and Covre Transportes e Logística.

In August 2015, while signing its first contracts and carrying out its certification process before the Brazilian aeronautical authority, it opened a 1,000 square meter Air Cargo Terminal (TECA) with the capacity to process up to 80 tons of cargo per day at Campinas Viracopos International Airport, its base of operations.

On January 21, 2016, Modern Logistics received its first aircraft, the Boeing 737-400SF registration PP-YBA (MSN 24125), essential for its certification process. The aircraft underwent a passenger-to-cargo conversion process in PEMCO World Air Services hangars in Florida, United States, before heading to Campinas.

On April 4, 2017, the new airline obtained the green light and received its air operator certificate (CHETA, in Portuguese) from the National Civil Aviation Agency of Brazil (ANAC). The process culminated in the signing of the concessionary contract for public services for regular air transport in June, with Modern being authorized to carry out its first commercial flights.

=== First years (2017-2023) ===
Modern Logistics' first flight took place on July 12, 2017, when the cargo plane took off from Campinas at 10:48 pm towards Guararapes–Gilberto Freyre International Airport in Recife carrying 14.6 tons of automotive parts. The cargo was transported under a customs transit regime, which allows the transport of goods from one customs area to another, where customs clearance will take place. The aircraft then took off back to Viracopos, with three other flights for the same route already scheduled for the next few days.

On September 13, 2017, Modern Logistics began regular flights, flying from Campinas to Brasília and Manaus, in addition to the charter flights it was already carrying out to meet the demands of its customers. On December 21, the airline received its second 737-400SF, registration PP-YBB (MSN 25374).

In April 2018, motorcycle manufacturer Harley-Davidson signed a road and air transport contract with Modern Logistics to transport motorcycles from the manufacturer's factory in Manaus to the brand's 21 dealerships throughout Brazil. After collection at the manufacturing unit, the motorcycles are transported to Eduardo Gomes International Airport, in Manaus. From there, they are sent to the airports of Brasília or Viracopos, in Campinas. And then, they are shipped and transported, by road, to Harley-Davidson dealerships. On April 26, it received its third plane, the first Boeing 737-300SF in its fleet. The aircraft registration PP-YBC (MSN 24219) entered commercial operation on July 31, reinforcing the airline's cargo transport capacity, which announced the arrival of a fourth aircraft, also of the same model.

On November 5, 2018, it received its second Boeing 737-300SF, the fourth aircraft in the fleet. With the Brazilian aeronautical registration number PP-YBD, it was transferred between Lasham, in England, and Foz do Iguaçu, in Brazil with technical stops in Lisbon (Portugal), Ilha do Sal (Cape Verde) and Recife (Brazil).

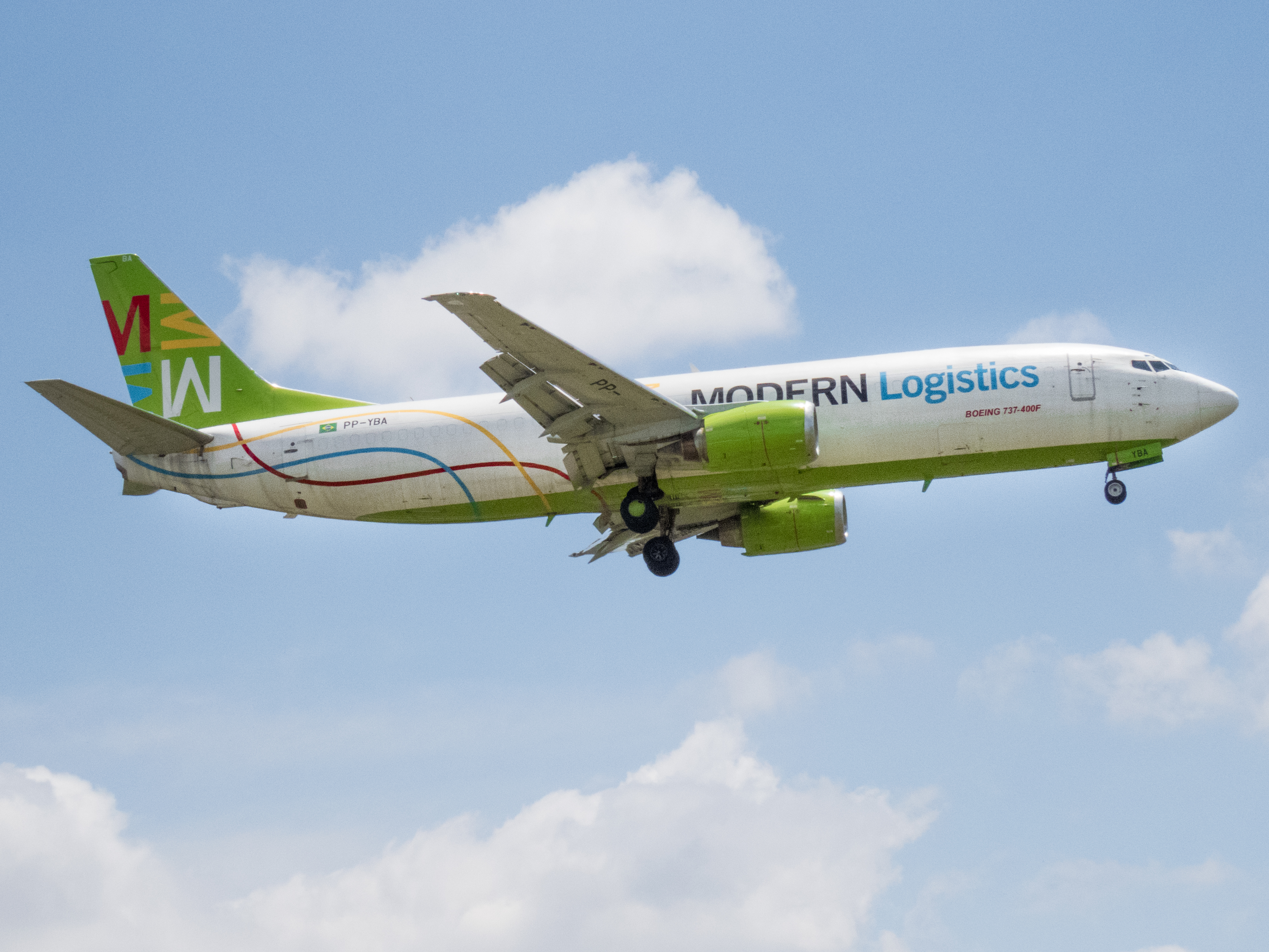
Modern Logistics Boeing 737-400SF

On October 15, 2019, Modern Logistics landed in its fifth destination, Rio de Janeiro, operating three regular weekly flights between its hub in Campinas Viracopos and Galeão International Airport. Fifteen days later, on October 30, to increase operational efficiency, Modern announced the adjustment of its destination network with immediate effect, suspending separate scheduled flights between Brasília and Manaus, Brasília and Recife and Campinas and Brasília, which were replaced by a single flight on the Manaus – Recife – Brasília – Campinas route.

==== 2020s ====
On April 14, 2021, the vice president of Modern Logistics, Adalberto Febeliano, announced that the airline had plans to replace its Boeing 737 Classic fleet with modern Boeing 737 Next Generation, in addition to incorporating ATR 72 freighter turboprops to serve air cargo demand in smaller cities. In April, during an interview with ch-aviation, the information was confirmed by the company's founder and president, Gerald Lee, who announced that he was planning a new round of capital raising to finance the renewal and growth of its future fleet.

On December 12, 2022, the Brazilian portal specialized in aviation AeroIN obtained access to an internal communication sent by Modern Logistics executives to their employees, informing that despite the growth recorded in recent years, the airline was facing several external factors that impacted negatively affect the national and global economy with a consequent considerable increase in operating costs. Therefore, it would go through a restructuring process to readapt its operational model, which could result in the dismissal of employees, opening up space for adherence to a voluntary dismissal program (PDV).

=== Restructuring (2023-present) ===
On January 11, 2023, Modern Logistics confirmed that, due to the difficulties resulting from the pandemic and the Brazilian economic scenario, it underwent a "deep restructuring" process with the change of its management, operating model and minimization of the overhead of employees at all levels of the airline to maximize its operational efficiency and create a solid foundation from which to resume growth. It also confirmed the dismissal of pilots, the suspension of the incorporation of ATR 72 turboprops and announced the renewal of the fleet to reduce operating costs. On an interim basis, its chief financial officer (CFO) Mario Fernandes da Costa assumed leadership of the airline.

On May 9, 2023, Modern Logistics announced executive Cristiano Koga, former vice president of FedEx in South America, as the new Chief Executive Officer (CEO). On the occasion, the airline also announced that the interim chief executive officer and CFO, Fernandes da Costa, had successfully negotiated the lease of Boeing 737-800BCF aircraft to replace its 737-300 and 737-400, to be added to the fleet by the following year.

On September 30, 2023, Modern Logistics received its first Boeing 737-800BCF. The 19-year-old plane, leased from BBAM Aircraft Leasing & Management, received the Brazilian aeronautical registration PP-YBF (MSN 33566), replacing the Boeing 737-400SF registration PP-YBA, which was returned to the lessor on January 13, 2023. Furthermore, the lease contract for a Boeing 737-300SF registration PP-YBC has been extended, so that the transition between fleets can be facilitated. According to the airline, in addition to increasing payload transport capacity per flight, the new plane offers fuel savings of up to 15% compared to the predecessor model.

On February 14, 2024, advancing its fleet renewal process, Modern returned the Boeing 737-300SF registration PP-YBD to the lessor, replacing it with its second 737-800BCF, registration PP-YBE (MSN 33550), which was delivered on February 22. On the same day, the airline put into operation its first Boeing 737 Next Generation, registration PP-YBF, which took off from Campinas Viracopos to Brasília International Airport fulfilling flight MWM-5800, which later headed towards Manaus.

==== Future ====
On April 15, 2024, during an interview with InfoMoney, Cristiano Koga, CEO of Modern Logistics, announced that the airline will be certified for international flights in the coming months, namely to Colombia, Ecuador, Chile, Argentina and Uruguay. And within six months to a year, he hopes to be able to fly to the United States. He stated that Modern Logistics managed to recover revenue and profitability in 2023 and in the first quarter of 2024, the airline grew by double digits, resuming its growth and expansion pace. The airline also obtained a capital injection from a new controlling shareholder, a family office based in the United States, through DXA, a Brazilian private equity manager that has contributed more than US$100 million to the airline since Modern Logistics went into operation.

== Destinations ==
| City | Airport | Begin | End | Refs |
|---|---|---|---|---|
| Brasília | Pres. Juscelino Kubitschek International Airport | | | |
| Campinas | Viracopos International Airport | | | |
| Manaus | Brig. Eduardo Gomes International Airport | | | |
| Recife | Guararapes–Gilberto Freyre International Airport | | | |
| Rio de Janeiro | Galeão–Antonio Carlos Jobim International Airport | 15 October 2019 | | |

== Fleet ==
=== Current fleet ===
As of August 2025, Modern Logistics operates the following aircraft:

Modern Logistics fleet
| Aircraft | In service | Orders | Passengers | Note |
|---|---|---|---|---|
| Boeing 737-400SF | 1 | — | Cargo | To be replaced by the Boeing 737 Next Generation |
| Boeing 737-800BCF | 2 | — | Cargo | Replaced the Boeing 737-300F |
| TOTAL | 3 | — | | |

=== Former fleet ===
In its first years of operation, Modern Logistics simultaneously operated four Boeing 737 Classic. However, from 2023, aiming to modernize its fleet to expand cargo capacity and reduce costs, it began to replace them with the more modern and efficient 737-800 Boeing Converted Freighter (BCF), thus beginning the retirement of its classic 737-300SF and 737-400SF.

Retired Modern Logistics fleet
| Aircraft | Total | Years of operation | Note |
|---|---|---|---|
| Boeing 737-300SF | 2 | 2018-2024 | Returned to lessor KV Aviation |
| Boeing 737-400SF | 1 | 2016-2023 | Returned to lessor Jetran |
| TOTAL | 3 | | |

== See also ==
- List of airlines of Brazil
