= Rio de Janeiro/Galeão International Airport =

Main airport serving Rio de Janeiro, Brazil

Rio de Janeiro/Galeão–Antonio Carlos Jobim International Airport Aeroporto Internacional do Rio de Janeiro/Galeão–Antonio Carlos Jobim

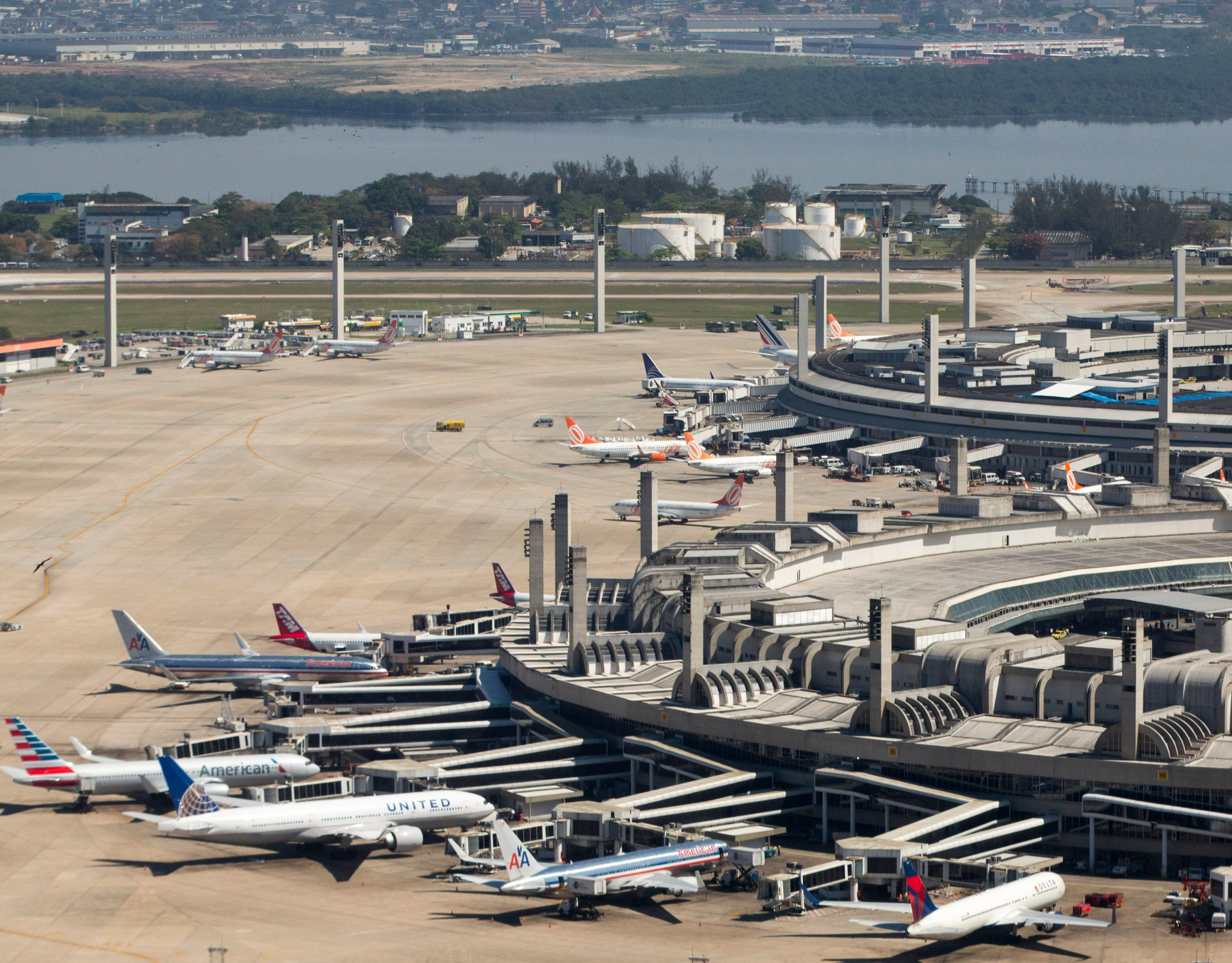
- IATA: GIG; ICAO: SBGL; LID: RJ0001

Summary
- Airport type: Public / military
- Operator: ARSA (1973–1987); Infraero (1987–2013); RIOgaleão (2013–2026); AENA (2026–present)
- Serves: Rio de Janeiro
- Opened: 1 February 1952; 74 years ago
- Hub for: Gol Linhas Aéreas
- Focus city for: LATAM Airlines Brasil
- Time zone: BRT (UTC−03:00)
- Elevation AMSL: 9 m (30 ft)
- Coordinates: 22°48′36″S 043°15′02″W
- Website: www.riogaleao.com/passageiros

Maps
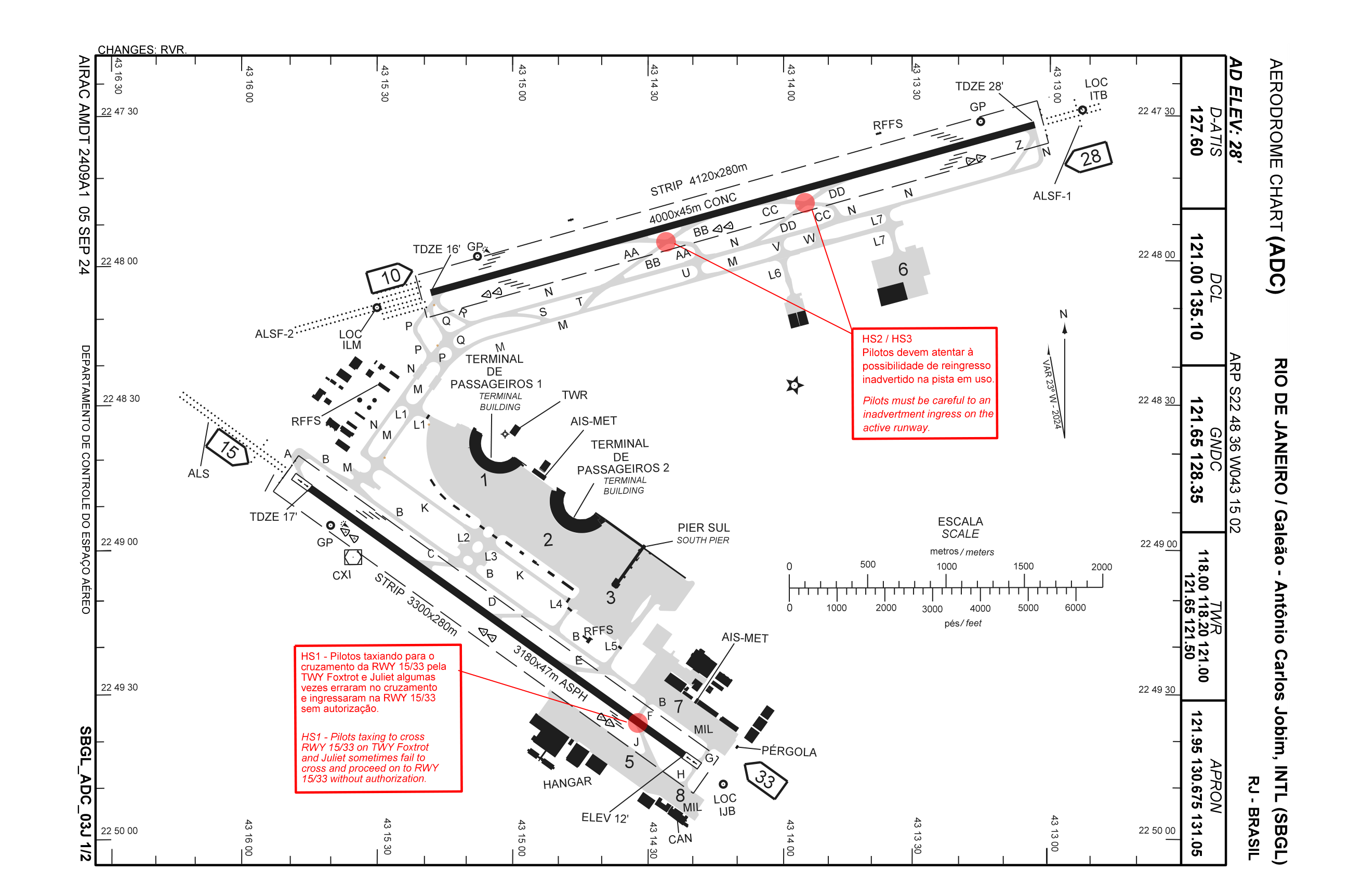
- DECEA airport chart

- Location in Rio de Janeiro Location in State of Rio de Janeiro Location in Brazil Location in South America

Runways
Direction	Length		Surface
Direction	m	ft	Surface
10/28	4,000	13,123	Concrete
15/33	3,180	10,433	Asphalt

Statistics (2025)
- Passengers: 17,906,990 ▲24%
- Aircraft operations: 129,363 ▲18%
- Statistics: RIOGaleão; Sources: Airport Website, ANAC, DECEA

Rio de Janeiro/Galeão–Antonio Carlos Jobim International Airport (IATA: GIG, ICAO: SBGL), popularly known by its original name Galeão International Airport, is the main international airport serving Rio de Janeiro, Brazil.

The airport was originally named after the neighborhood of Galeão: Praia do Galeão (Galleon Beach) is located in front of the original passenger terminal (the present passenger terminal of the Brazilian Air Force). This beach is the location where the galleon Padre Eterno was built in 1663. On 5 January 1999 the name was changed adding a tribute to the Brazilian musician Antonio Carlos Jobim. Galeão Airport is explicitly mentioned in his composition Samba do Avião.

Since 30 March 2026 the facility is jointly managed by the concessionary RioGaleão (formed by Infraero, Changi Airport Group, and Vinci) and the winner of the reconcession bidding process AENA.

Some of its facilities are shared with the Galeão Air Force Base of the Brazilian Air Force.

== History ==
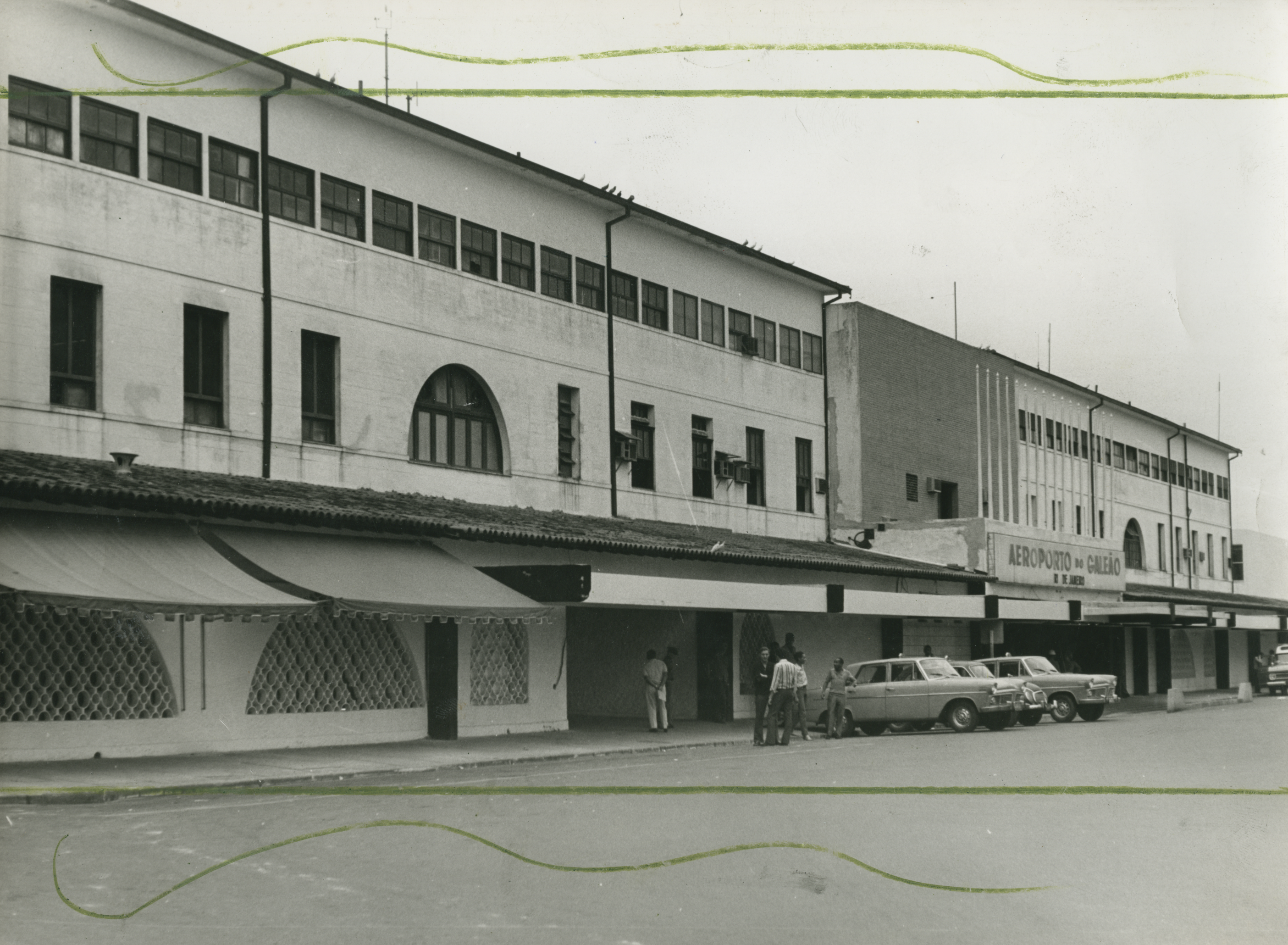
Entrance of the original Passenger Terminal Building used between 1952 and 1977

On 10 May 1923, a School of Naval Aviation was established near Galeão beach on Governador Island. On 22 May 1941, with the creation of the Brazilian Air Force Ministry, the school became the Galeão Air Force Base; a terminal and hangars were built and the runway extended. Those buildings still exist and Galeão Air Force Base is still active. When Brazil declared war against the Axis on 22 August 1942, the aerodrome began to be used intensely by the Allies for military operations related to World War II.

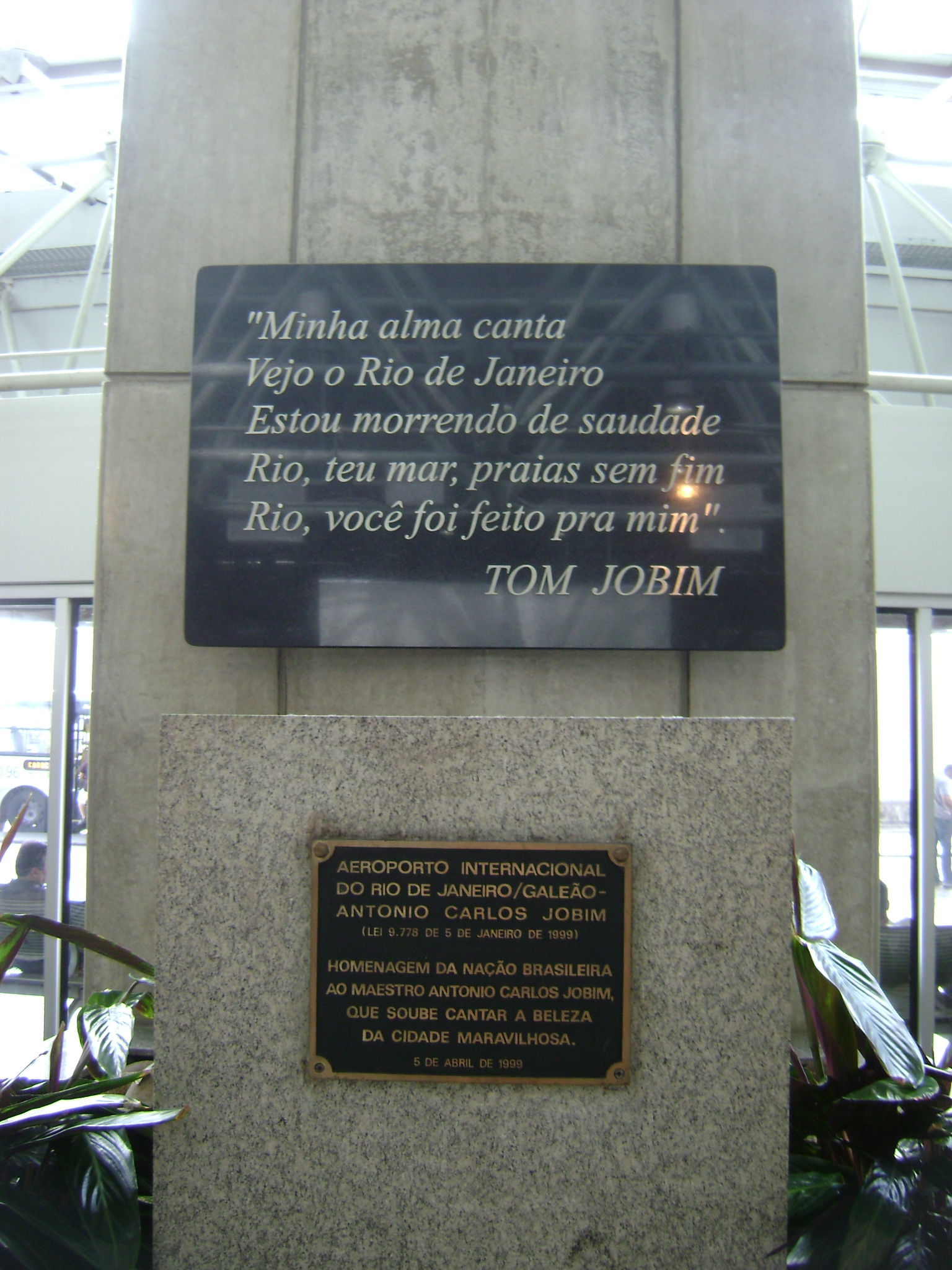
Tribute to Tom Jobim at Rio de Janeiro International Airport

At the end of the war, Santos Dumont Airport was unable to handle the increased tonnage of aircraft flying on international routes and number of passengers. For this reason, international flights were gradually moved to the site of the Air Force Base. The services were however precarious and a decision was made to build a brand new passenger terminal, opposite to the Air Force Base, across the runway.

On 1 February 1952, the new passenger terminal was opened and remained in use with enlargements until 1977. This terminal is used presently by passenger flights operated by the Brazilian Air Force. The cargo terminal is also located in the area and all-cargo aircraft usually park at its adjoining apron. The whole complex is now informally known as the "old Galeão".

In the beginning of the 1970s, the airport was Brazil's major international and domestic air-hub. Between 1973 and 1987 the airport was managed by ARSA, until ARSA was incorporated by Infraero on 27 February 1987, an agency then recently created by the Brazilian government. Infraero was the administrator until 2013.

As proof of the airport's prestige, the Concorde made its maiden scheduled flight with Air France on 21 January 1976, flying from Paris–Charles de Gaulle to Galeão via Dakar. Those twice-weekly flights were discontinued in 1982. Furthermore, the 007 – James Bond production Moonraker (1979) shows the Concorde touching down at Galeão.

On 6 June 1967, in response to the growth of air traffic in Brazil, the Brazilian government initiated studies concerning the renovation of airport infrastructure in the country. As part of the conclusions of these studies, because of their location, strategic importance, and security issues, new passenger facilities would be constructed in the Galeão Air Force Base in Rio de Janeiro and the São Paulo Air Force Base in São Paulo.

On 20 January 1977, when the airport was receiving most of Brazil's major international flights, this new terminal was opened and all scheduled passenger flights were transferred to the new building. This building is known today as Passenger Terminal 1. One of the features dating from this time is the sultry PA system announcements made by Iris Lettieri, which were featured on National Public Radio.

In 1985, the airport lost the title of the country's major international airport to the newly-opened São Paulo–Guarulhos International Airport. At that time, a new runway allowing intercontinental flights with no weight restrictions was opened in São Paulo and Brazilian and foreign airlines increasingly used São Paulo as a national and international hub. As a consequence, the number of transiting passengers dropped. Constant efforts were made by the government of the state of Rio de Janeiro to reverse the trend. As a result, after stagnating for years embittered by the loss of domestic flights to Santos Dumont Airport and international flights to São Paulo–Guarulhos Airport, Galeão has – since late 2004 – gradually recovered its importance in the national and international spheres with addition of flights and airlines.

During 1991, Passenger Terminal 1 underwent its first major renovation in preparation for the United Nations Earth Summit held in 1992. Its annual capacity was increased to 7.5 million passengers a year. On 20 July 1999, Passenger Terminal 2 was opened. The airport has those two passenger terminals in elliptical format, each with twelve jetways and capable of handling 7.5 million passengers annually.

On 31 August 2009, Infraero unveiled a R$819 million (US$431 million; €302 million) investment plan to upgrade Galeão International Airport focusing on the preparations for the 2014 FIFA World Cup which was held in Brazil, Rio de Janeiro being one of the venue cities, and the 2016 Summer Olympics, which Rio de Janeiro would host. The investment was supposed to be distributed as follows:

- Renovation of Passenger Terminal 1. Completed: 2012.
- Completion and renovation of Passenger Terminal 2. Completed: June 2012.
- Construction of further parking. Value 220.0 million. Completed: late 2013.

Responding to critiques to the situation of its airports, on May 18, 2011, Infraero released a list evaluating some of its most important airports according to its saturation levels. According to the list, Galeão was considered to be in good situation, operating with less than 70% of its capacity.

Like most South American airports operated by government-owned operators, Galeão had high operating costs per passenger. On 26 April 2011, it was confirmed that in order to speed-up much needed renovation and upgrade works, private companies would be granted a concession to operate some Infraero airports among them, on a second phase, Galeão. The plan was confirmed on 31 May 2011, and it was added that Infraero would retain 49% of the shares of each privatized airport. On 22 November 2013, the Brazilian Government had a bidding process to determine the airport's private operator from 2014 until 2039. The Group Aeroporto Rio de Janeiro, also known as RIOgaleão, formed by Grupo Odebrecht (60%) and Singaporean operator Changi Airport Group (40%) paid R$19 billion and won the competition. The contract was signed on 2 April 2014.

The new concessionary has been using the brand name RIOgaleão–Aeroporto Internacional Tom Jobim.

RIOgaleão, has revised, modified and upgraded those plans to include the construction of a new pier with 26 new bridges, a new apron for 97 aircraft, and 2,640 car-parking spaces have been added in 2016–17, which would sum up to R$2 billion reais.

One day after the closure of the 2016 Summer Olympics, Galeão handled an all-time record of passengers on a single day. It is estimated that on 22 August 2016, 85,000 passengers transited at the airport facilities.

On 10 February 2022, the concessionary requested the devolution of the facility. The request was approved by the National Civil Aviation Agency of Brazil on 25 May 2022. The new biding process took place on March 30, 2026. The winner was AENA, becoming, thus the new concessionary of the facility. RioGaleão (formed by Infraero with 49% of the shares, and Changi Airport Group, and Vinci with 51% of the shares, the latter having replaced the original Brazilian investor Odebrecht) and AENA will jointly manage the facility until the re-concession process is completed. AENA holds 100% of the concession because Infraero ceased to hold 49% of the shares.

On 27 May 2022, TAP Maintenance & Engineering closed the facility at Galeão which it had operated since 2006. This maintenance center was previously owned by Varig. On 7 July 2022, United Airlines was announced as the new owner of the facility.

In April 2022, the airport was used for Stock Car Pro Series automobile racing. Cacá Bueno Circuit, named after Cacá Bueno, Rio de Janeiro-born and 5 times Stock Car Brasil champion, was built within the airport partially using runways 10/28 for this purpose. However, the circuit was not included in the 2023 Stock Car Pro Series calendar due to the increase of flights after the COVID-19 pandemic.

Galeão was the primary airport of Rio de Janeiro, being the much smaller Santos Dumont Airport the secondary facility until 2019. In 2020 positions inverted and in 2022 Santos Dumont was accounting for approximately 63% of the total traffic of Greater Rio de Janeiro, spread into three airports. In 2022 Santos Dumont reached 10,178,502 transported passengers whereas Galeão had only 5,895,257. In order to control and revert this abnormal trend, on August 10, 2023 the Civil Aviation National Council issued an order to restrict Santos Dumont services to airports located within 400 km maximum from Rio de Janeiro and without international services. The resolution came into force on January 1, 2024, and is considered to be provisory, until a balance is reached. Airlines started cancelling and/or moving services to Galeão in September 2023. Following resistance from the international aviation community, on November 8, 2023 the restrictions were reversed and replaced by an annual cap of 6.5 million passengers transiting at Santos Dumont Airport, starting in 2024.

The facility covers a total of 1,788.2 hectares (4,419 acres), being the largest airport site in terms of area in Brazil.

== Airlines and destinations ==
=== Passenger ===
Since November 2016, the check-in and baggage claim areas of Terminal 1 are not in use. All passengers must use Terminal 2 to access the boarding gates of any terminal.

Airlines	Destinations
Aerolíneas Argentinas	Buenos Aires–Aeroparque, Córdoba (AR); Seasonal: Buenos Aires–Ezeiza, Mendoza, Rosario
Air Canada	Seasonal: Toronto–Pearson
Air France	Paris–Charles de Gaulle
Air Transat	Seasonal: Montréal–Trudeau, Toronto–Pearson
American Airlines	Miami; Seasonal: Dallas/Fort Worth, New York–JFK
Avianca	Bogotá
Azul Brazilian Airlines	Belo Horizonte–Confins, Campinas, Curitiba, Porto Alegre, Recife
Boliviana de Aviación	Santa Cruz de la Sierra–Viru Viru
British Airways	Buenos Aires–Ezeiza (ends 28 March 2027), London–Heathrow
Copa Airlines	Panama City–Tocumen
Delta Air Lines	Atlanta; Seasonal: New York–JFK
Emirates	Buenos Aires–Ezeiza, Dubai–International
Gol Linhas Aéreas	Aracaju, Asunción (ends 30 January 2027), Belém, Belo Horizonte–Confins, Brasília, Buenos Aires–Aeroparque, Buenos Aires–Ezeiza, Campinas, Campo Grande (ends 30 January 2027), Córdoba (AR), Curitiba, Florianópolis, Fortaleza, Foz do Iguaçu, Goiânia, Ilhéus (ends 30 January 2027), João Pessoa, Lisbon, Macapá, Maceió, Manaus, Montevideo (ends 26 January 2027), Natal, Navegantes, Porto Alegre, Porto Seguro, Recife, Rosario, Salta (begins 17 December 2026), Salvador da Bahia, São José dos Campos, São Luís, São Paulo–Congonhas, São Paulo–Guarulhos, Teresina, Uberlândia (ends 30 January 2027), Vitória; Seasonal: Mendoza, New York–JFK
Iberia	Madrid
ITA Airways	Rome–Fiumicino
JetSmart Argentina	Buenos Aires–Aeroparque, Buenos Aires–Ezeiza, Córdoba (AR); Seasonal: Asunción
JetSmart Chile	Mendoza, Montevideo, Santiago de Chile
KLM	Amsterdam
LATAM Brasil	Brasília, Buenos Aires–Aeroparque, Buenos Aires–Ezeiza, Curitiba, Fortaleza, Foz do Iguaçu, Manaus, Porto Alegre, Porto Seguro, Salvador da Bahia, São Luís, São Paulo–Guarulhos, Vitória; Seasonal: Florianópolis, João Pessoa, Maceió, Recife
LATAM Chile	Santiago de Chile
LATAM Perú	Lima
Lufthansa	Frankfurt
Paranair	Seasonal: Asunción
Sky Airline	Santiago de Chile; Seasonal: Montevideo
Sky Airline Peru	Lima (begins 28 December 2026)
TAP Air Portugal	Lisbon, Porto
United Airlines	Houston–Intercontinental

=== Cargo ===
Airlines	Destinations
Aerotranscargo	Hahn
Atlas Air	Miami, Lima
Cargolux	Campinas, Luxembourg
LATAM Cargo Brasil	Belo Horizonte–Confins, Cabo Frio, Campinas, Ciudad del Este, Curitiba, Manaus, Miami, Porto Alegre, São Paulo–Guarulhos
LATAM Cargo Chile	Amsterdam, Buenos Aires–Ezeiza, Frankfurt, Miami, Montevideo, Santiago de Chile
LATAM Cargo Colombia	Bogotá, Lima, Miami, Quito
Modern Logistics	Campinas
Sky Lease Cargo	Miami

== Statistics ==
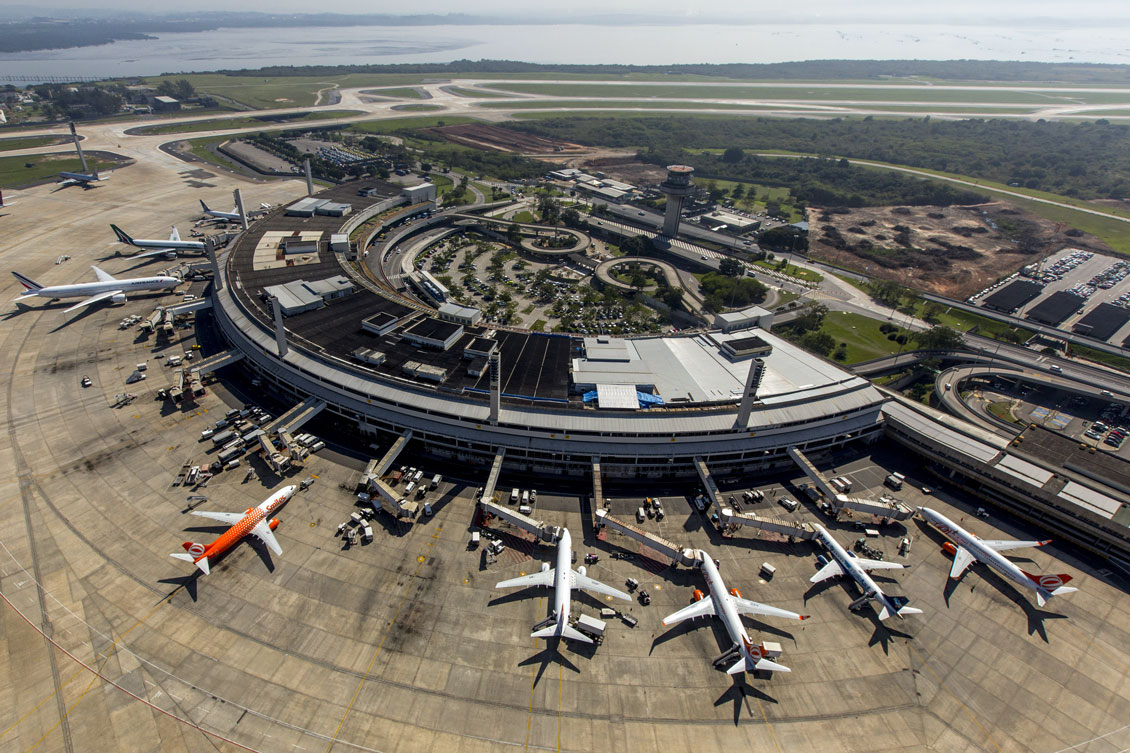
Terminal 1

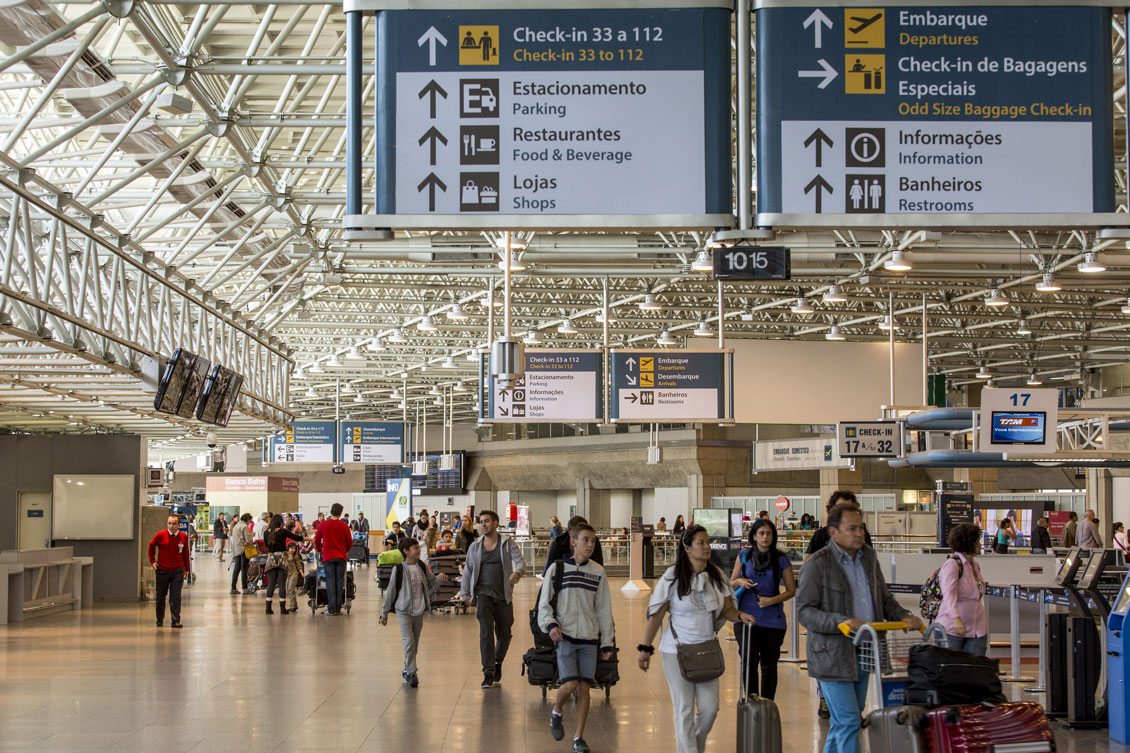
Terminal 2 check-in area

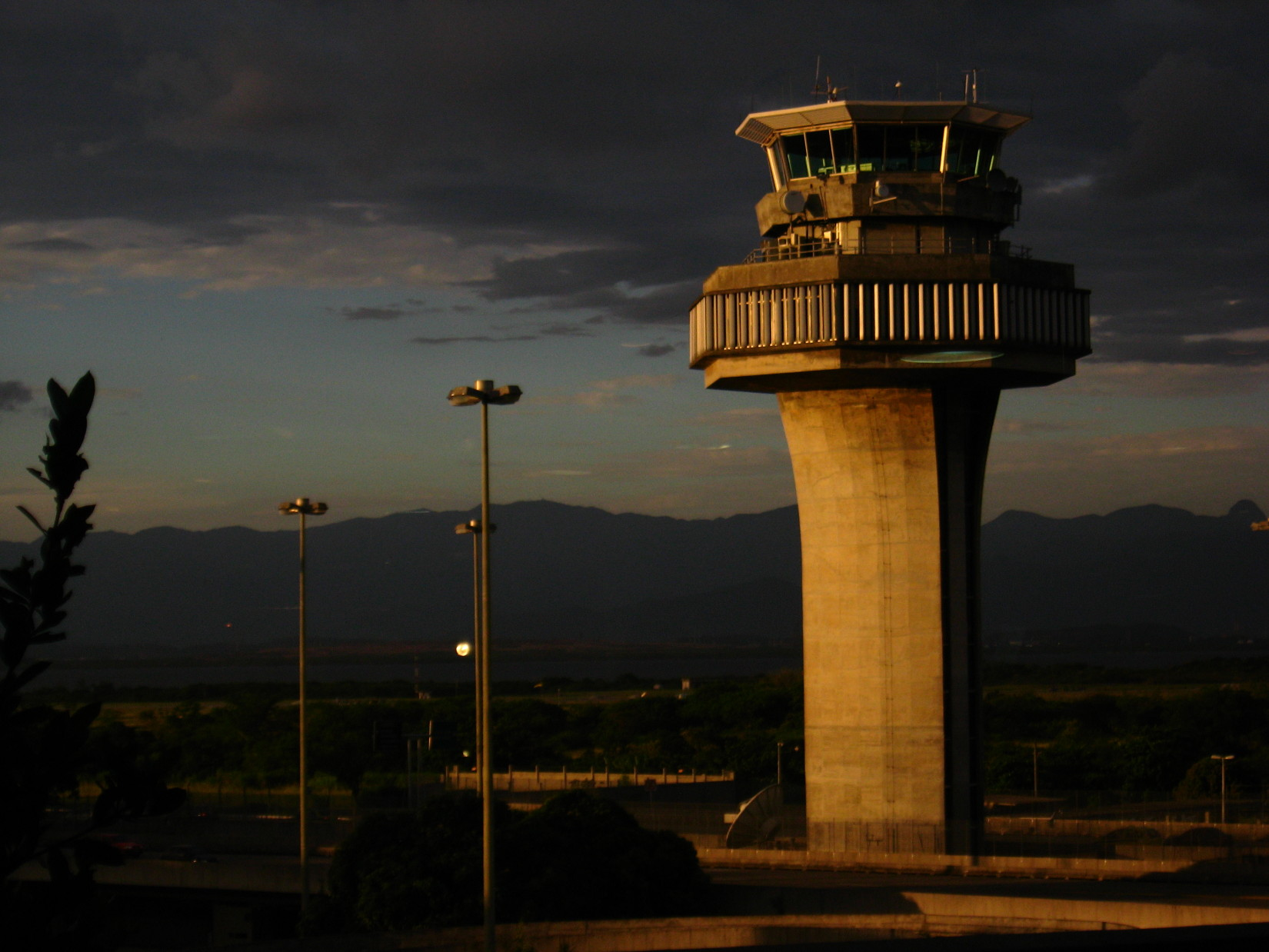
Air traffic control tower

Following are the number of passenger, aircraft and cargo movements at the airport, according to Infraero (2007-2013) and RIOgaleão (2014-2025) reports:

Year	Passengers	Aircraft	Cargo (t)
2025	17,906,990 ▲24%	129,363 ▲18%	
2024	14,491,987 ▲82%	109,393 ▲74%	
2023	7,946,244 ▲35%	62,921 ▲24%	
2022	5,895,257 ▲50%	50,851 ▲27%	
2021	3,925,263 ▼15%	40,014 ▼6%	
2020	4,635,133 ▼66%	42,423 ▼60%	
2019	13,507,881 ▼10%	104,832 ▼8%	
2018	15,035,083 ▼7%	113,726 ▼5%	
2017	16,242,767 ▲1%	120,138 ▼3%	
2016	16,103,352 ▼5%	124,471 ▼6%	
2015	16,942,229 ▼2%	132,792 ▼6%	
2014	17,303,340 ▲1%	140,556 ▼2%	
2013	17,115,368 ▼2%	143,245 ▼7%	116,147 ▼2%
2012	17,495,737 ▲17%	154,318 ▲11%	118,783 ▼4%
2011	14,952,830 ▲21%	139,443 ▲13%	123,132 ▲14%
2010	12,337,944 ▲4%	122,945 ▲3%	108,381 ▼2%
2009	11,828,656 ▲10%	119,287 ▼9%	110,853 ▼3%
2008	10,754,689 ▲4%	130,597 ▲9%	119,243 ▲3%
2007	10,352,616	119,892	115,977

== Accidents and incidents ==
- 27 July 1952: a Pan Am Boeing 377 Stratocruiser 10–26 registration N1030V operating flight 201 en route from Rio de Janeiro–Galeão to Buenos Aires–Ezeiza following pressurization problems during climb, a door blew open, a passenger was blown out and the cabin considerably damaged. One passenger died.
- 11 January 1959: a Lufthansa Lockheed L-1049G Super Constellation registration D-ALAK operating Flight 502 flying from Hamburg to Rio de Janeiro–Galeão via Frankfurt, Paris–Orly and Dakar crashed during approach under heavy rain at Galeão. The crew descended below minimums. Of the 39 passengers and crew aboard, three survived. This was the first accident of Lufthansa after it was re-established.
- 22 December 1959: a VASP Vickers Viscount 827 registration PP-SRG while on approach to land at Rio de Janeiro–Galeão was involved in a mid-air collision with the Brazilian Air Force Fokker S-11 (T-21) registration FAB0742 in the vicinity of Manguinhos Airport. All 32 people on board the Viscount were killed, as were a further ten on the ground. The T-21 pilot parachuted to safety. This accident eventually led to the closure of Manguinhos Airport.
- 20 August 1962: Panair do Brasil Flight 026, a Douglas DC-8-33 registration PP-PDT taking-off from Rio de Janeiro–Galeão to Lisbon overran the runway into the ocean during an aborted operation. Of the 120 passengers and crew aboard 14 died.
- 1 January 1970: a Cruzeiro do Sul Sud Aviation SE-210 Caravelle VI R en route from Montevideo to Rio de Janeiro–Galeão with 33 occupants aboard was hijacked by six people who demanded to be flown to Cuba. The flight was diverted to Lima, Panama City and arrived in Havana two days later. There were no victims.
- 1 July 1970: a Cruzeiro do Sul Sud Aviation SE-210 Caravelle VI R registration PP-PDX en route from Rio de Janeiro–Galeão to São Paulo with 31 occupants aboard was hijacked by 4 persons who demanded the release of political prisoners that were to be taken to Cuba. The aircraft was stormed and the hijackers arrested. There were no victims and the hijacking lasted less than a day.
- 9 June 1973: a Varig cargo Boeing 707-327C registration PP-VJL flying from Campinas to Rio de Janeiro–Galeão while making an instrument approach to Rio de Janeiro–Galeão had technical problems with the spoilers which eventually caused the aircraft to pitch down, descended fast, struck approach lights and ditch. All six occupants died.
- 26 July 1979: a Lufthansa cargo Boeing 707-330C registration D-ABUY operating flight 527 from Rio de Janeiro–Galeão to Frankfurt via Dakar collided with a mountain 5 minutes after take-off from Galeão. The crew of three died.
- 2 December 1985: an Air France Boeing 747-228B, registration F-GCBC, arriving from Paris–Charles de Gaulle with 273 passengers and crew, veered off the right side of runway 15 on landing, crossed a ditch and collided with a concrete wall in the cargo apron. There was a fire that totally destroyed the aircraft, but all occupants had been safely evacuated before that, with no victims or serious injuries. The accident was later traced to a ruptured power control cable in engine #1, which made the engine accelerate beyond maximum takeoff power, destabilizing the plane.

== Access ==
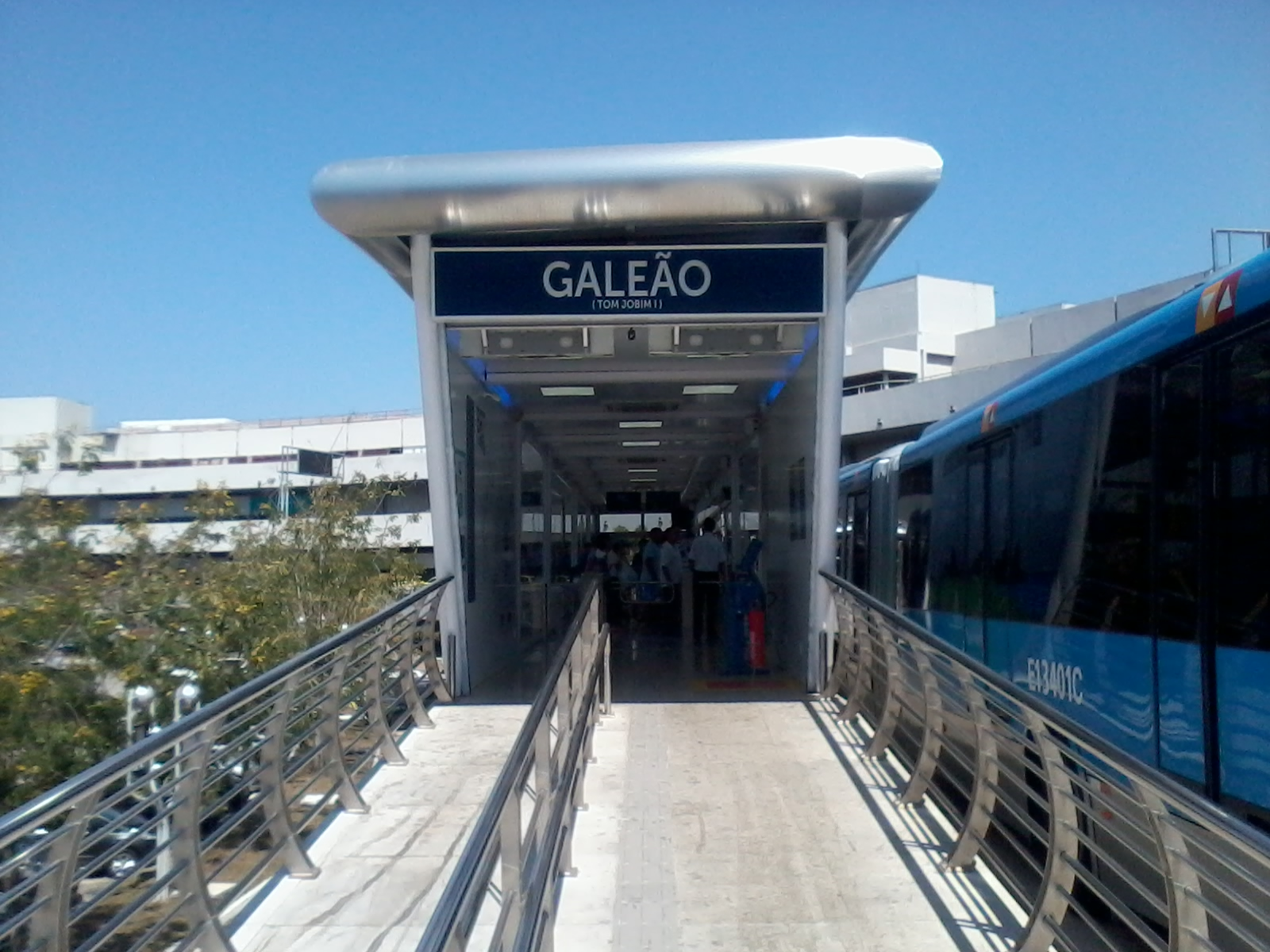
BRT station

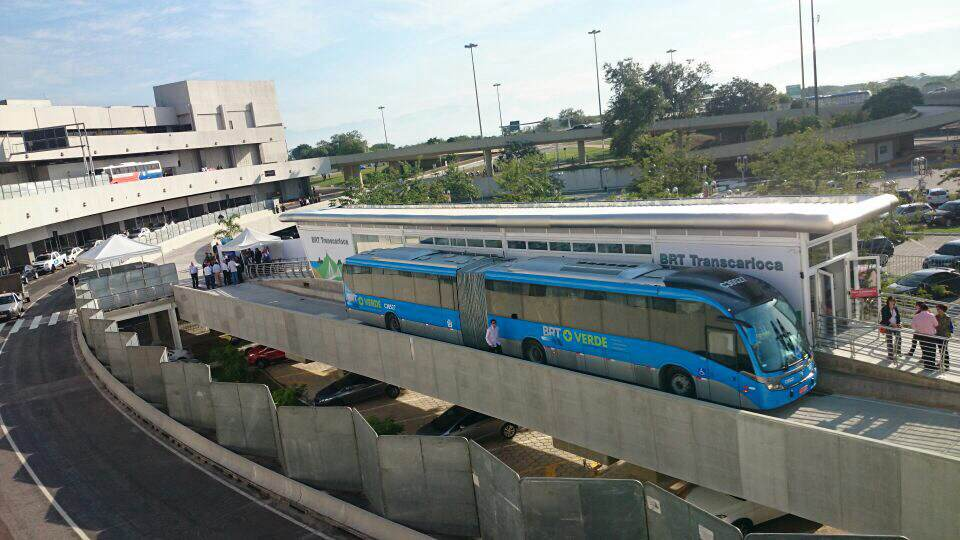
TransCarioca BRT station at GIG

The airport is located 20 km (12 mi) north of downtown Rio de Janeiro.

There are executive (blue) and ordinary (yellow) taxis available and bookable on company booths at arrival halls of both terminals.

The TransCarioca line of the BRT system has an all-stop service that links Terminals 1 and 2 with Madureira station in Madureira, where passengers can transfer to the Deodoro, Santa Cruz and Japeri lines of the suburban rail system, as well as with another all-stop TransCarioca service continuing to Terminal Alvorada in Barra da Tijuca and an express TransCarioca service to Terminal Recreio in Recreio dos Bandeirantes. Intermediate stops include Penha (where passengers can transfer to the Saracuruna line of the suburban rail and to an all-stop TransBrasil service towards Gentileza Intermodal Terminal), Vicente de Carvalho (where passengers can transfer to Line 2 of the metro) and Mercadão de Madureira (where passengers can transfer to the Belford Roxo line of the suburban rail). There is also a non-stop BRT service to Gentileza Intermodal Terminal with a more expensive fare, which allows for transfer to the Rio de Janeiro Light Rail and several urban and long-distance bus lines. The BRT system operates 24 hours a day and tickets are sold in the BRT booths on the arrivals level.

Viação 1001 operates the urban bus line 761-D from the airport to Niterói. Furthermore, the same company operates an executive service to Armação dos Búzios four times a day. Departure is from the arrivals level of Terminal 1.

Ordinary city busses 924 and 925 operate to the neighborhood of Ilha do Governador, and 915 to Bonsucesso. From both neighborhoods there are connections to the north and south sides of the city.

== Gallery ==
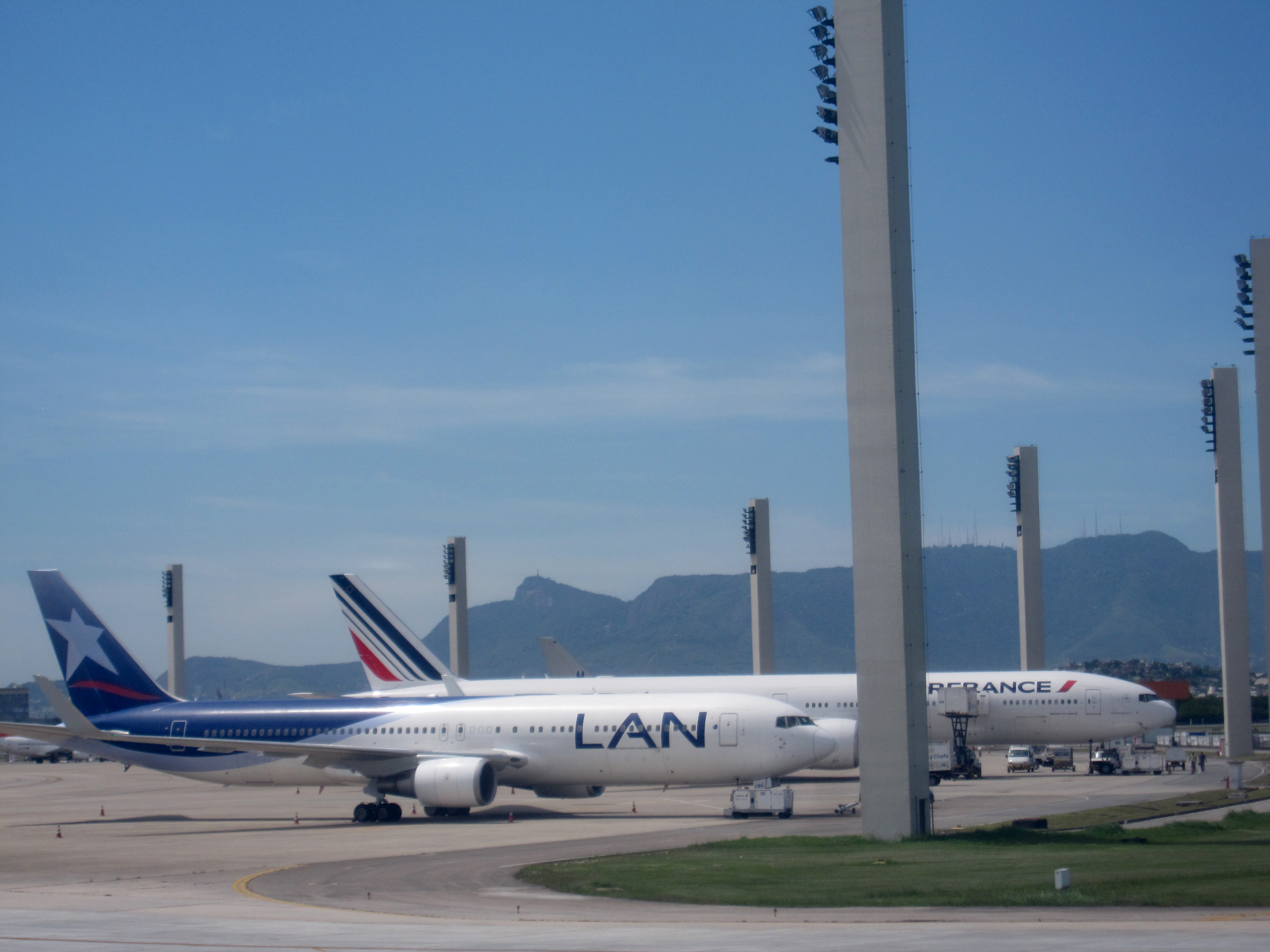
Aircraft at GIG with Corcovado in background

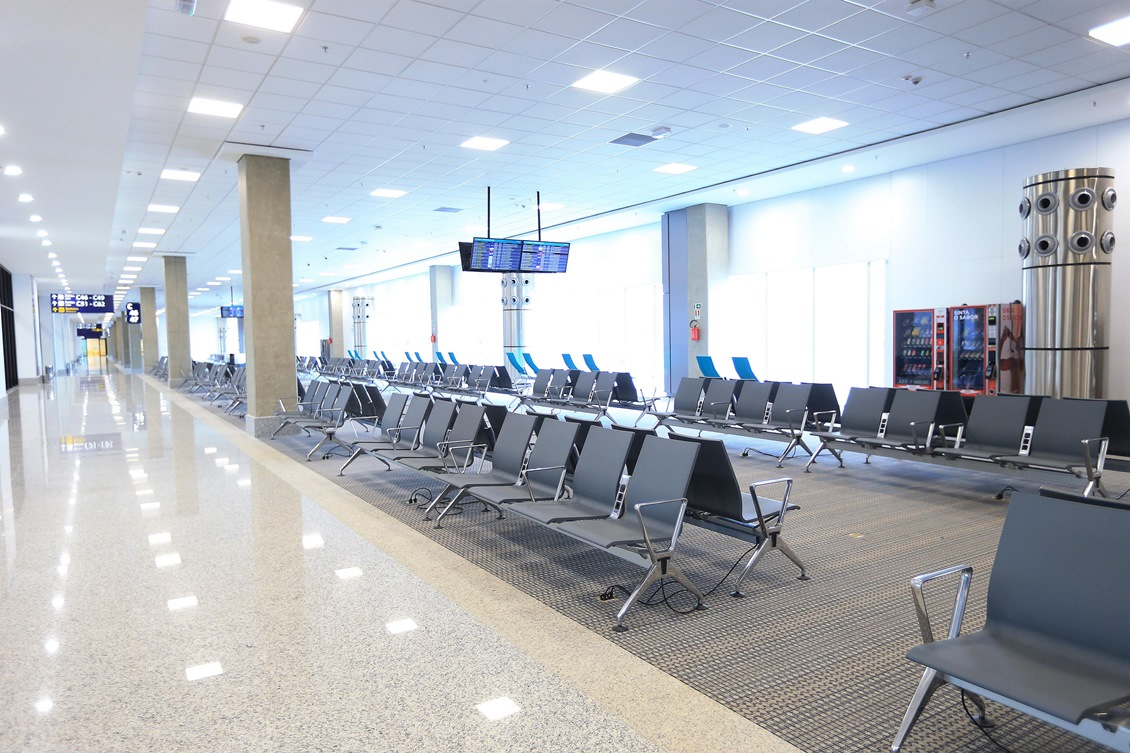
Terminal 2 airside

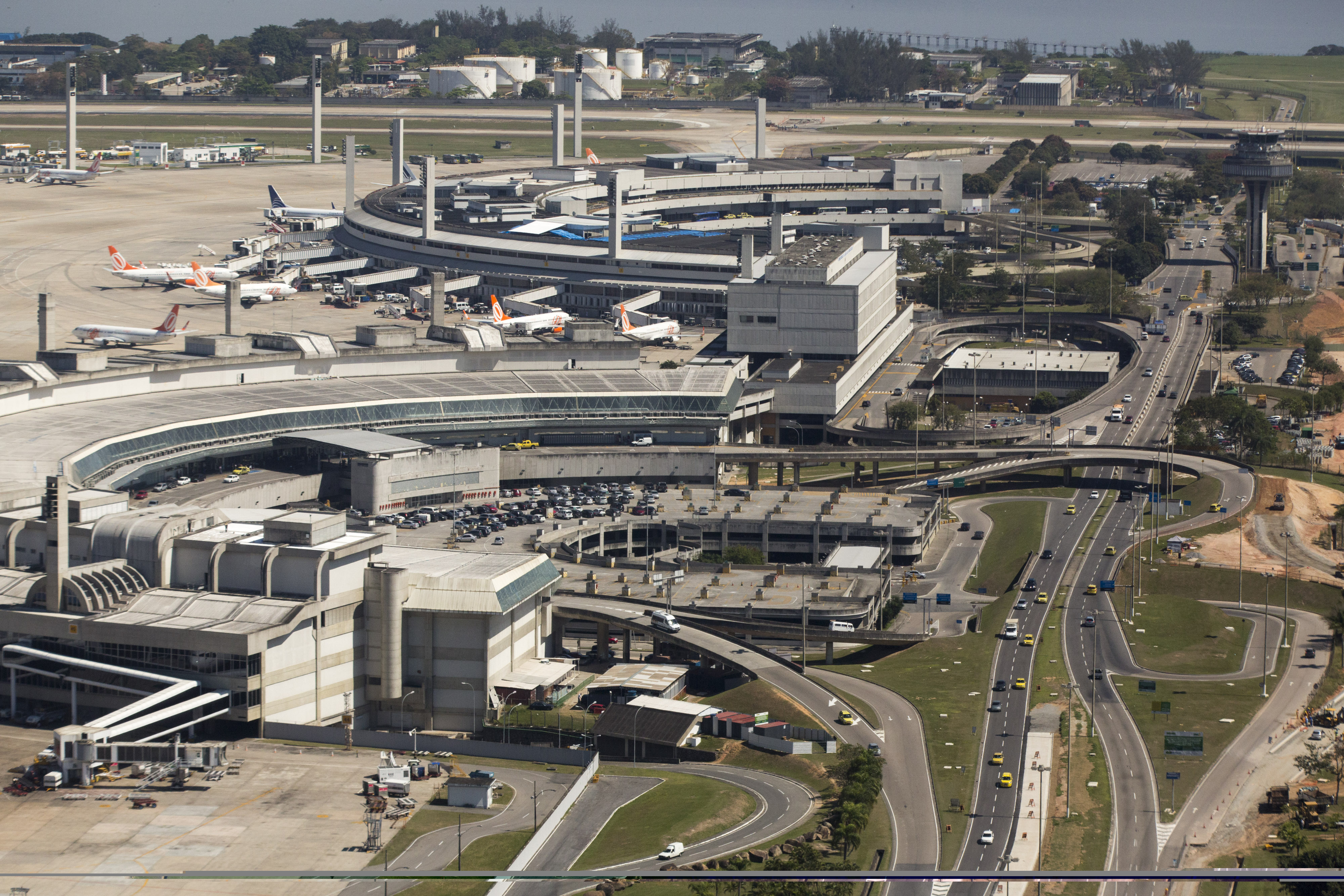
Road entrance towards Terminals 2 and 1

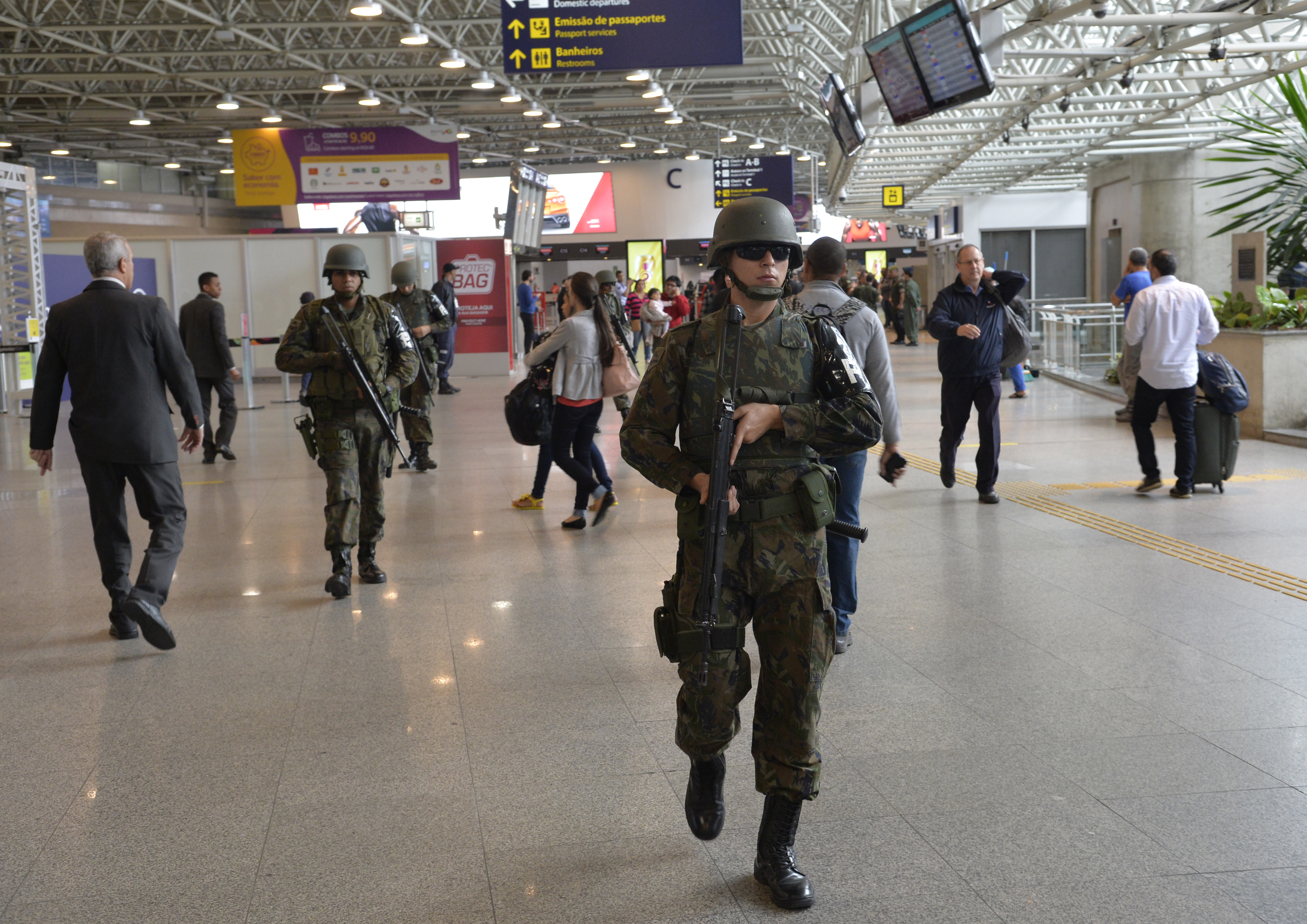
Military in the airport

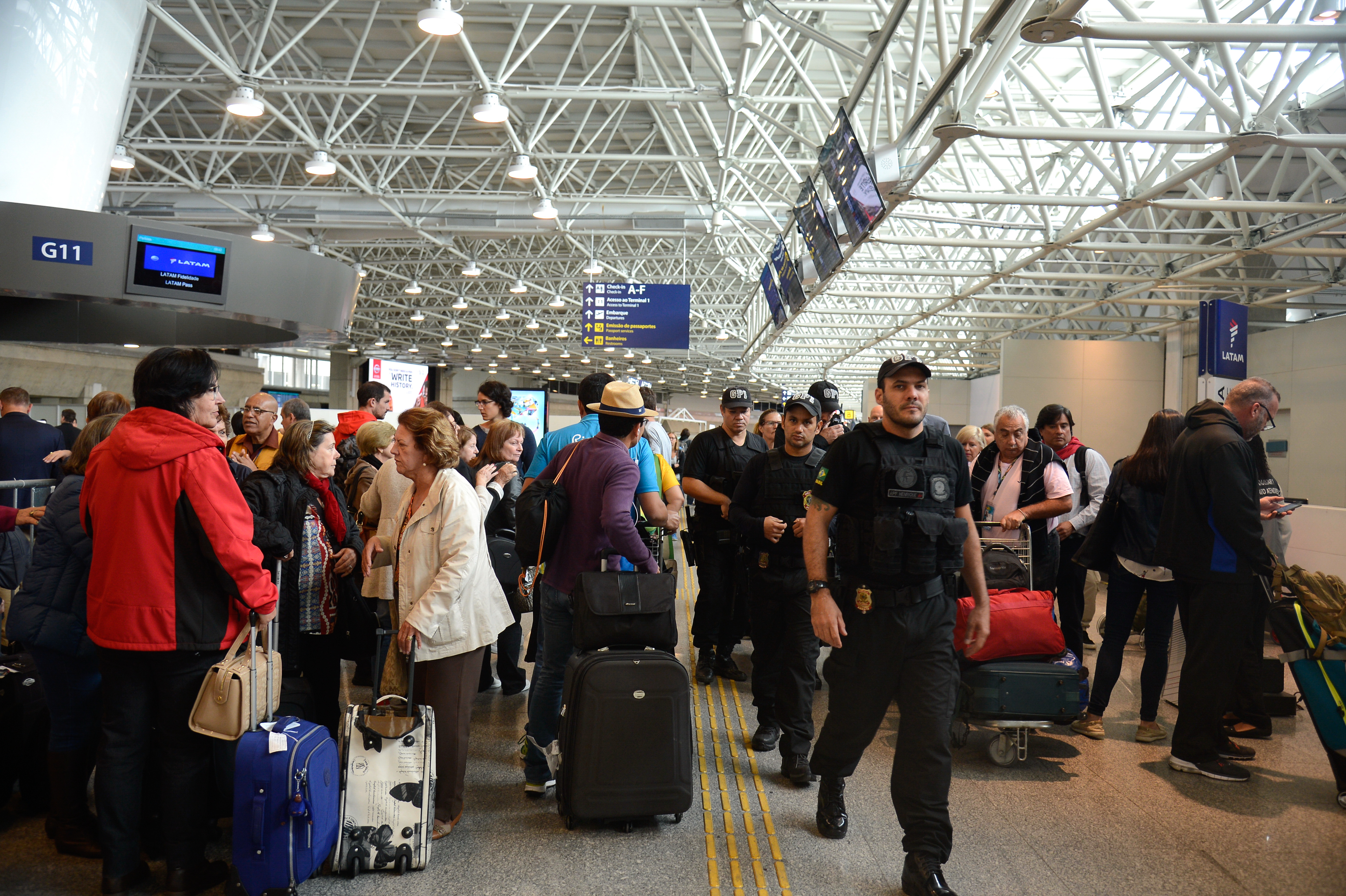
Federal police in the airport

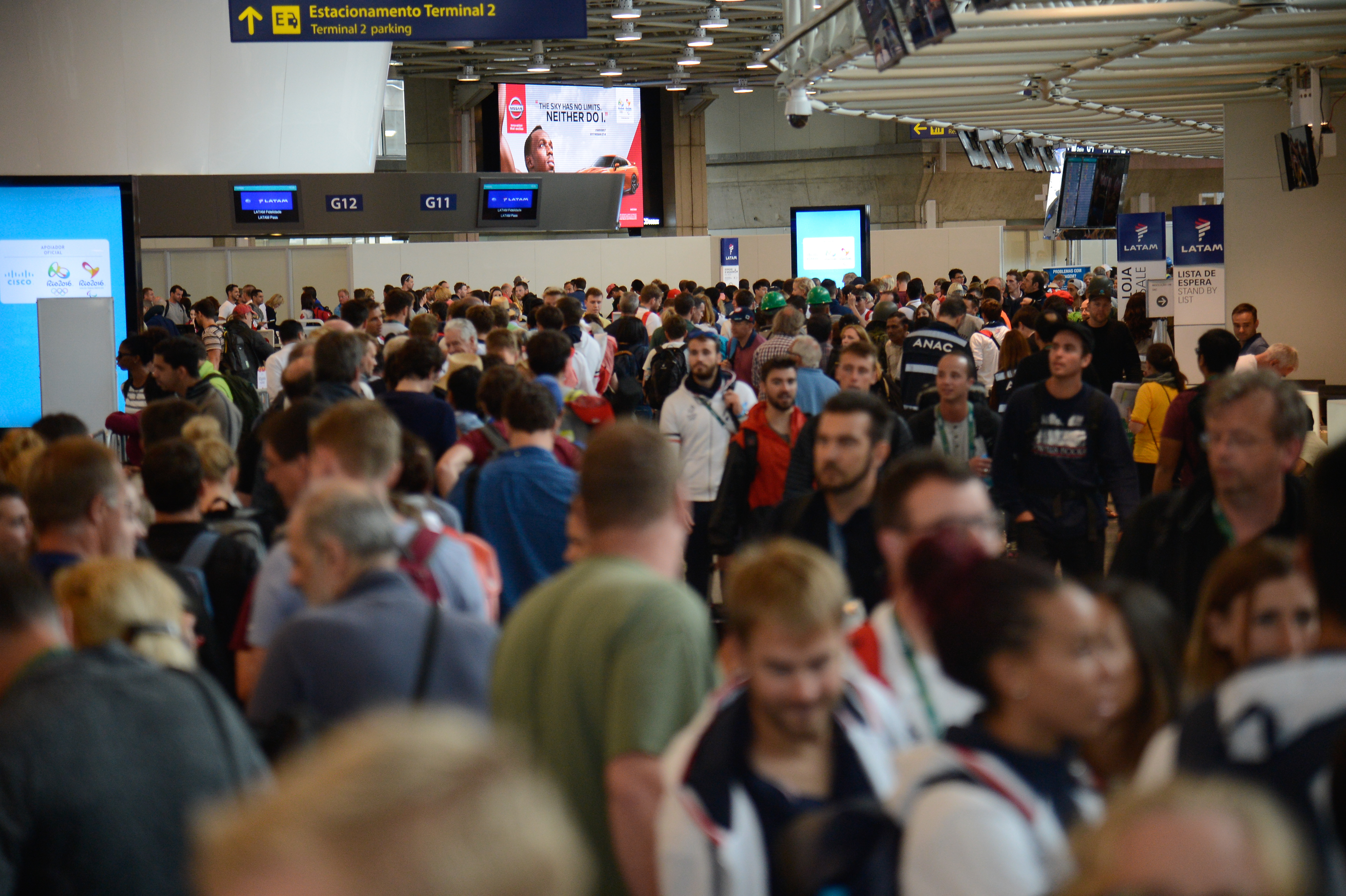
Airport during the 2016 Olympic Games

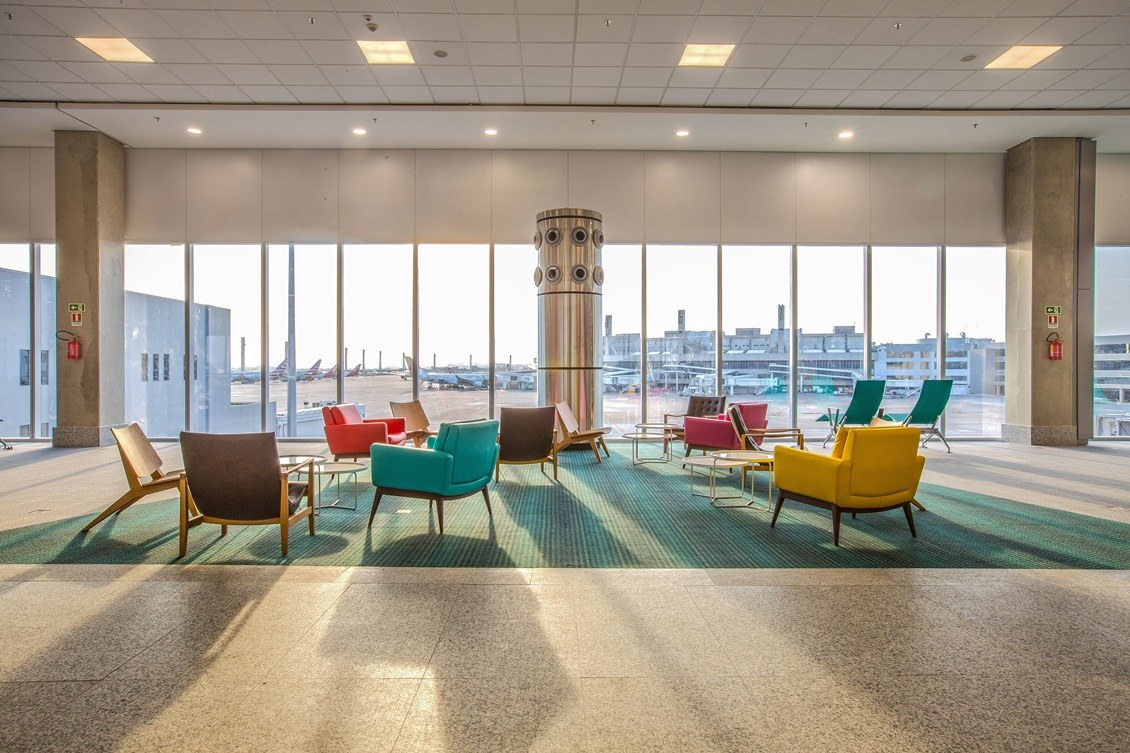
Colorful chairs in the airport

== See also ==
- List of airports in Brazil
- Galeão Air Force Base
