= Viracopos International Airport =

International airport in Campinas, Brazil

Viracopos/Campinas International Airport Aeroporto Internacional de Viracopos/Campinas

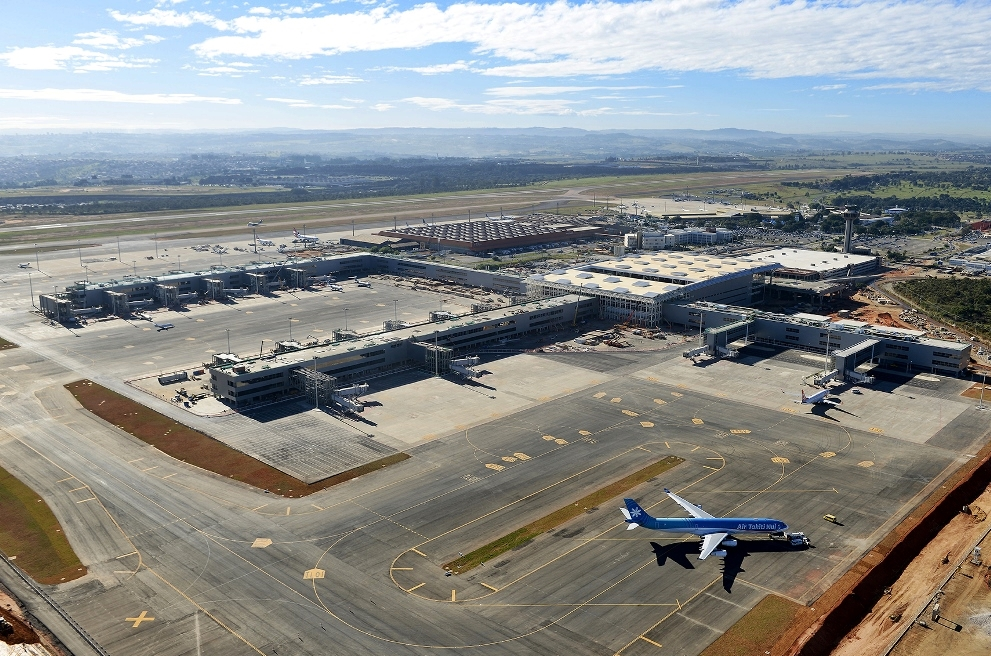
- IATA: VCP; ICAO: SBKP; LID: SP0003

Summary
- Airport type: Public
- Operator: Infraero (1977–2012); Aeroportos Brasil (2012–present)
- Serves: Campinas; São Paulo
- Location: Campinas, Brazil
- Opened: 19 October 1960; 66 years ago
- Hub for: Azul Brazilian Airlines; Braspress Air Cargo; LATAM Cargo; Modern Logistics
- Time zone: BRT (UTC−03:00)
- Elevation AMSL: 661 m (2,169 ft)
- Coordinates: 23°00′25″S 047°08′04″W
- Website: www.viracopos.com

Maps
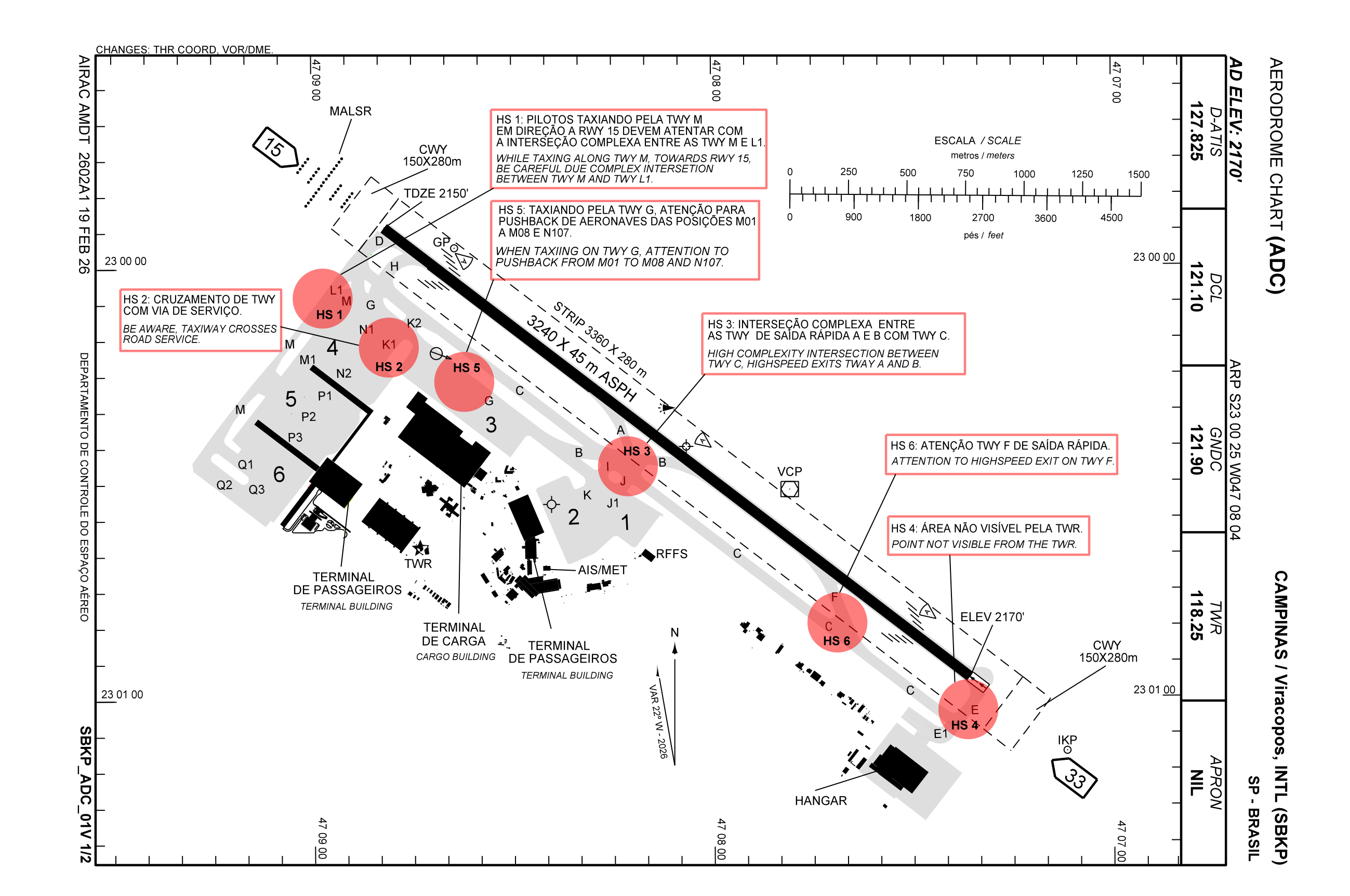
- DECEA airport chart

- Location in São Paulo State Location in Brazil Location in South America

Runways
Direction	Length		Surface
Direction	m	ft	Surface
15/33	3,240	10,630	Asphalt

Statistics (2025)
- Passengers: 12,826,553 ▲3%
- Aircraft Operations: 124,613 ▲2%
- Metric tonnes of cargo: 271,711 ▼1%
- Statistics: Aeroportos Brasil; Sources: Airport Website, ANAC, DECEA

The Viracopos/Campinas International Airport (IATA: VCP, ICAO: SBKP) (sometimes referred to as São Paulo/Campinas or São Paulo/Viracopos) is an international airport serving the municipality of Campinas, in the state of São Paulo.

On 6 January 1987, the airport name was officially normalised to its present form. It is named after the neighbourhood where it is located. It is operated by Aeroportos Brasil.

== History ==
The IATA airport code of Viracopos is VCP and the specific city code of Campinas is CPQ. Sometimes both codes are used as one although there is a distinction between them in airline reservation systems: VCP, together with CGH (Congonhas) and GRU (Guarulhos), is part of the multiple airport system set around the city of São Paulo (code SAO). An airline that files services with the code VCP has flights displayed when passengers or travel agents request service from São Paulo, whereas flights filed with the code CPQ are displayed as service from Campinas, not São Paulo. A similar example is New York City (NYC), in which the airport codes LGA (LaGuardia Airport), JFK (John F. Kennedy International Airport), and EWR (Newark Liberty International Airport) are used for the same city, although Newark is located in a different city and state.

There are two versions of the origin of the name Viracopos, which means "turn (or overturn) glasses" in Portuguese and can be metaphorically understood as drinking a large amount of an alcoholic beverage at once. According to the first version, in the beginning of the 20th century, during an annual fair, there was a misunderstanding between the parish priest and the residents of the neighborhood. This resulted in excessive drinking and quarrels, in which the festival booths were torn down, or overturned, during the confusion. The name "Viracopos" was later used by the priest in sermons to refer to the event. Another version says that, on the site of the present airport, previously there had been a bar where herders had regularly met to exchange views and drink ("turn glasses"). So "Viracopos" was first the name of the district and later of the airport.

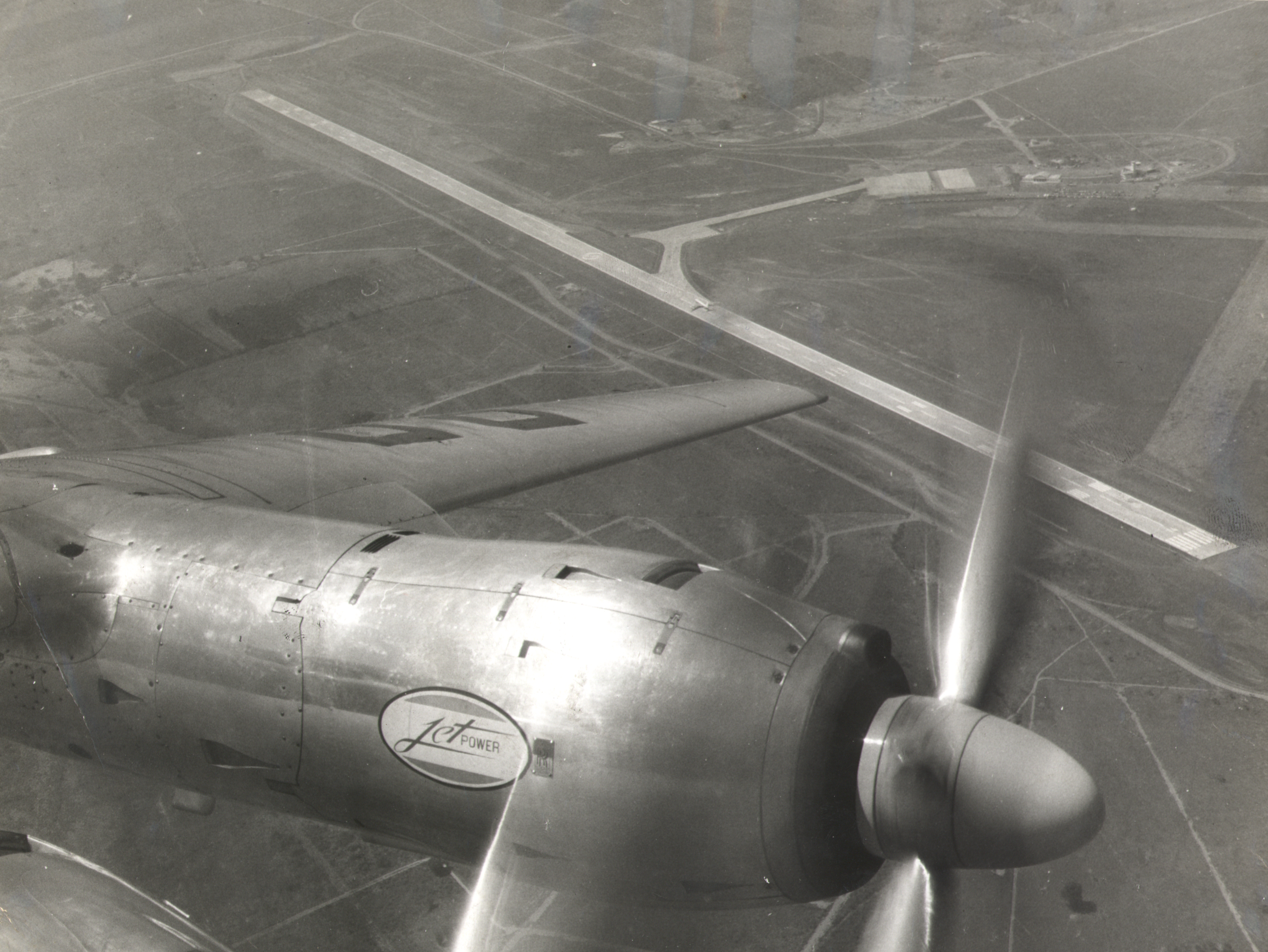
View of the airport in the 1960s

The origin of the Viracopos Airport can be traced to a simple airfield near Campinas built during the 1932 Constitutionalist Revolution in São Paulo. In 1946, shortly after World War II, the first runway was paved. In the following years, the airport began to take shape, with the construction of the first hangar in 1948 and the terminal in 1950. During the 1950s, it started being used by cargo companies. In 1960, it was improved with a 3,240 m (10,630 ft) runway, long enough to accommodate the first generation of intercontinental jet planes such as the Boeing 707, de Havilland Comet, Vickers VC10, Convair 990, and Douglas DC-8, and the airport was officially inaugurated on 19 October 1960, same day where it also received its first international flight. Furthermore, Viracopos Airport served (and still serves) as an alternate airport for Rio de Janeiro-Galeão International Airport and São Paulo airports particularly because it rarely closes due to bad weather conditions (an average of only 5 days per year).

After 1960, Viracopos became the primary international airport for São Paulo, because the runway of São Paulo-Congonhas Airport was too short to accommodate intercontinental jet planes. In practice, however, the distance of nearly 100 km (62 mi) from Viracopos to São Paulo made it very inconvenient for passengers and airlines. As a result, direct international passenger service was limited, because most international passengers simply opted to fly instead to Rio de Janeiro-Galeão International Airport and then connect to Congonhas Airport, which is located very close to downtown. At that time, Viracopos even appeared on the Guinness Book of Records as the furthest airport from the city it allegedly served.

The airport's title as the main international airport of São Paulo ended in 1985 with the opening of São Paulo-Guarulhos International Airport, and Viracopos entered into a decade of stagnation, with all international and most domestic flights transferred to Guarulhos and Congonhas.

However, recognizing the strategic importance of Viracopos for the economy, Infraero, the airport administrator in 1995, started to implement a master plan of renovations aiming at the building of a new airport, focusing its efforts on the segment of cargo transportation. The first phase was completed in the first half of 2004, when the airport received new passenger departure and arrival lounges, public areas, commercial concessions and a new cargo terminal. The second phase of the passenger terminal expansion project was completed in 2005 and a new control tower was built, storage and processing facilities for the cargo terminal expanded, and the passenger terminal was entirely revamped. A third phase of expansion, which would build a second runway by 2013, was projected. However, since the airport was conceded in 2012, the deadline for the new runway was postponed until 2018.

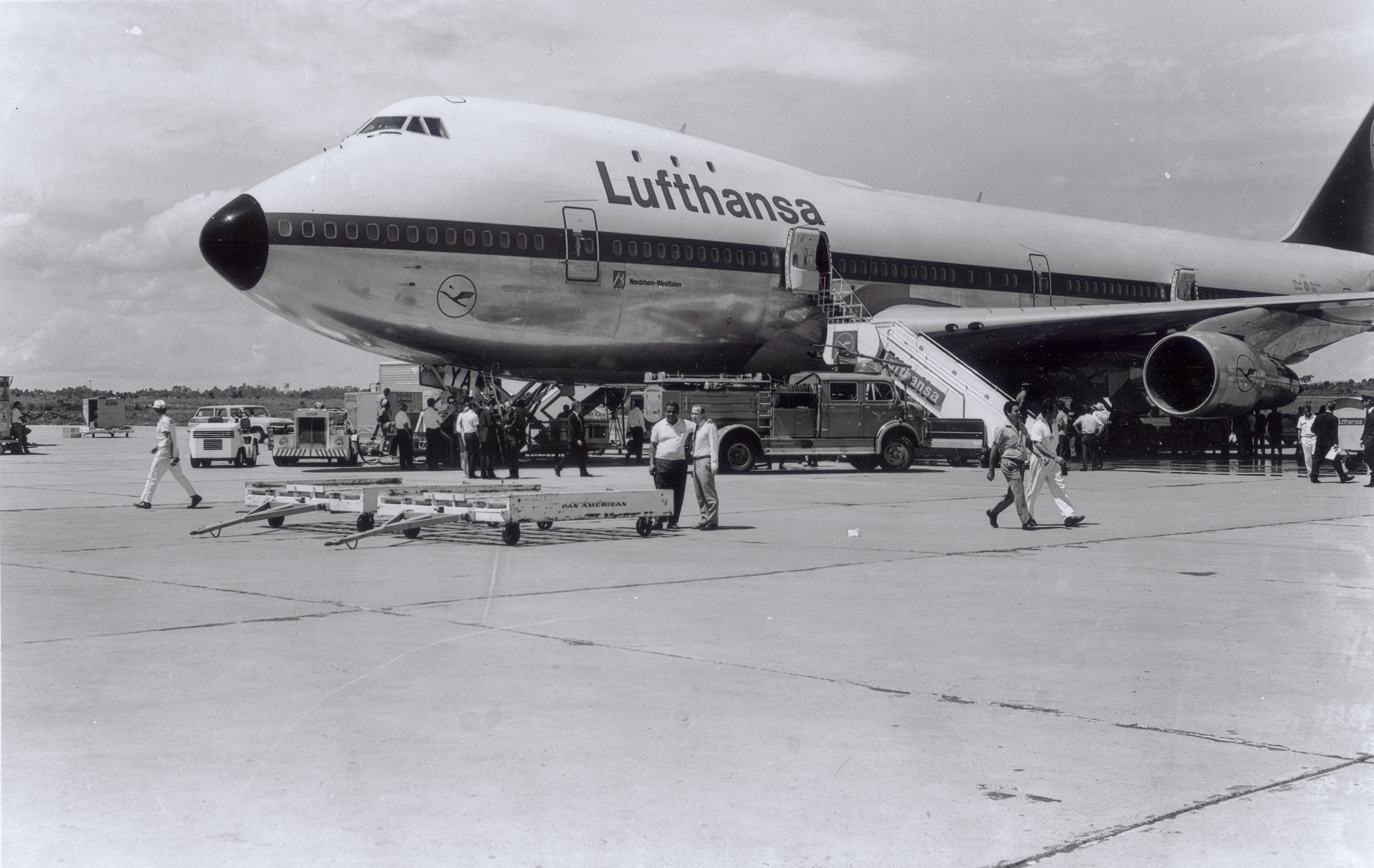
A Lufthansa 747 in Viracopos in 1970

Viracopos is the second busiest cargo airport in Brazil, with 77,000 square meters (646,000 square feet) of cargo terminals, 1,700 square meters (18,300 square feet) for animal cargo, and 1,480 cubic meters (52,200 square feet) of refrigerated space. As a major import/export hub, Viracopos has 'express lanes' for courier traffic which provide greater frequency.

Between 2008 and 2010, passenger traffic grew from 1.02 million in 2008 to 7.5 million in 2011. The airport can handle 7 million passengers/year. The number of flights offered has increased dramatically since Azul Brazilian Airlines made Viracopos its main hub.

In August 2009, the previous operator Infraero unveiled a R$2,814 million (US$1,482.6 million; €1,038.8 million) investment plan to upgrade Viracopos International Airport, focusing on the preparations for the 2014 FIFA World Cup and the 2016 Summer Olympics. The investment intended to provide a new runway, a new passenger terminal, and a new train route, with its main goal being to alleviate the air-traffic concentrated at Guarulhos International Airport.

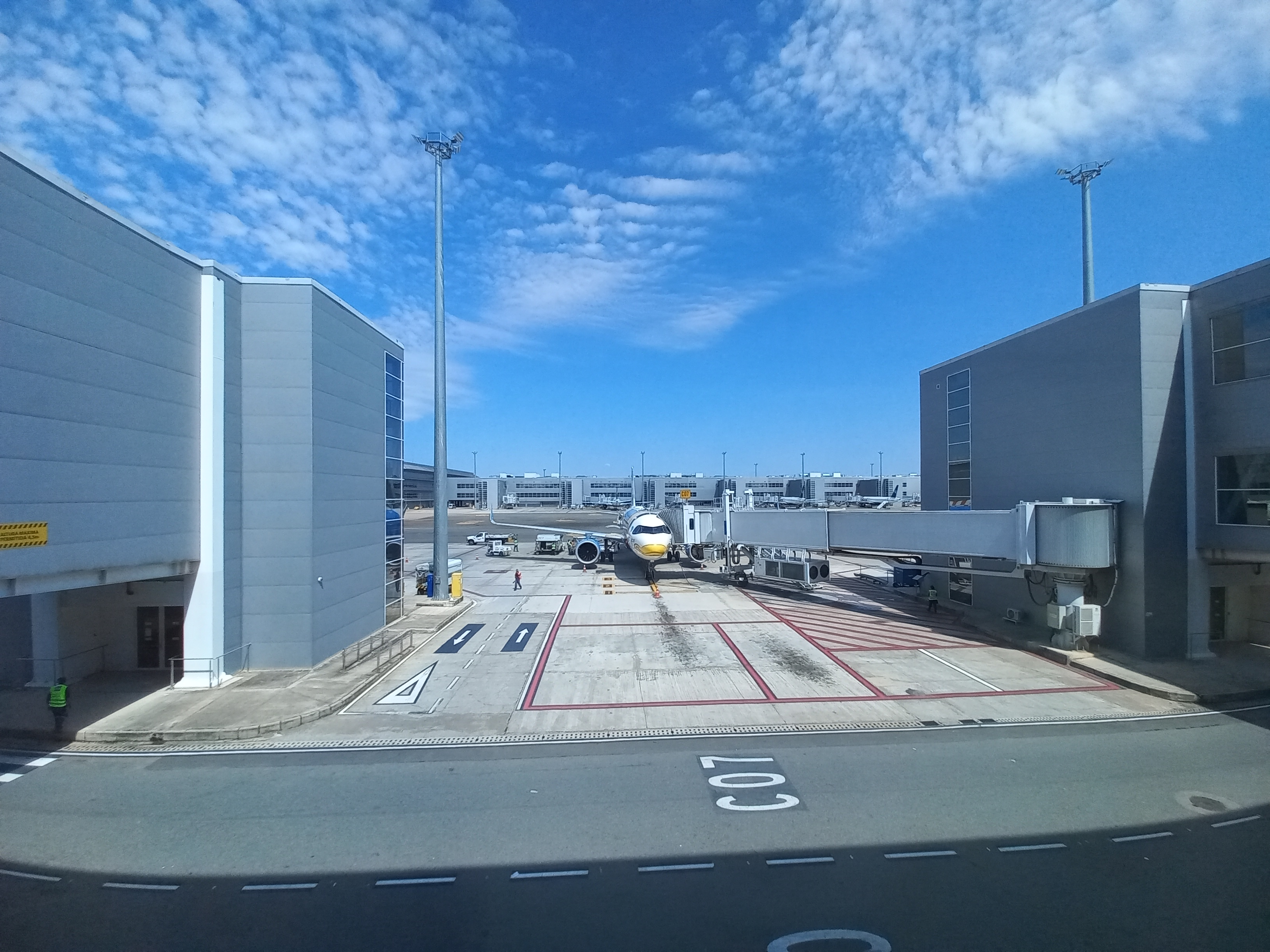
View of Terminal 2

However, due to legal and bureaucratic issues, the Infraero original plan never occurred. Since the concession to Consortium Aeroportos Brasil, a new investment program focusing particularly on the construction of a new terminal was announced. The phase 1 of the new passenger terminal opened in May 2015.

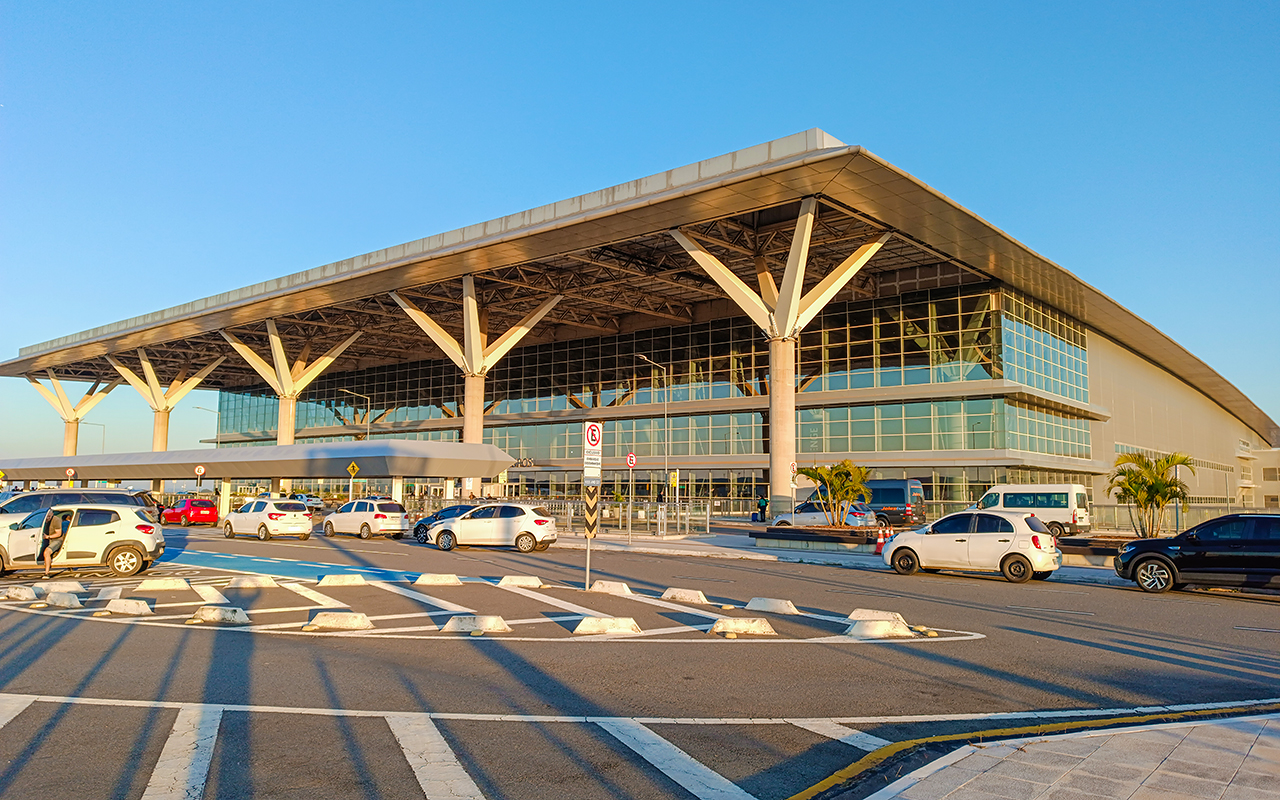
Viracopos parking

Responding to critiques to the situation of its airports, on 18 May 2011, Infraero released a list evaluating some of its most important airports according to its saturation levels. According to the list, Viracopos was considered to be requiring attention, operating between 70% and 85% of its capacity.

Following a decision made on 26 April 2011 by the Federal Government for private companies being granted concessions to operate some Infraero airports, on 6 February 2012, the administration of the airport was conceded, for 30 years, to the Consortium Aeroportos Brasil composed of the Brazilian Triunfo, an Investments and Funds Society (45%), UTC Engenharia e Participações, an Engineering and Investments Society (45%), and the French Aeroports Egis Avia (10%). Infraero, the state-run organization, remains with 49% of the shares of the company incorporated for the administration.

The facility encompasses 1,766 hectares (4,364 acres) of airport property and contains one 3,240m runway.

== Airlines and destinations ==
=== Passenger ===
Airlines	Destinations
Azul Brazilian Airlines	Alta Floresta, Aracaju, Araçatuba, Bauru/Arealva, Belém, Belo Horizonte–Confins, Boa Vista, Bonito, Brasília, Cacoal, Campo Grande, Cascavel, Caxias do Sul, Chapecó, Corumbá, Cuiabá, Curitiba, Fortaleza, Florianópolis, Fort Lauderdale, Foz do Iguaçu, Goiânia, Ilhéus, Ji-Paraná, João Pessoa, Joinville, Juazeiro do Norte, Juiz de Fora, Lisbon, Londrina, Maceió, Madrid, Manaus, Marília, Maringá, Natal, Navegantes, Orlando, Palmas, Passo Fundo, Pato Branco, Pelotas, Petrolina, Ponta Porã, Porto, Porto Alegre, Porto Seguro, Presidente Prudente, Recife, Ribeirão Preto, Rio de Janeiro–Galeão, Rio de Janeiro–Santos Dumont, Rondonópolis, Salvador da Bahia, São José do Rio Preto, São Luís, Sinop, Sorriso, Teresina, Uberlândia, Vilhena, Vitória; Seasonal: Campina Grande, Mendoza, Punta del Este, San Carlos de Bariloche
Azul Conecta	Araraquara, Barretos, Franca, Rio de Janeiro–Jacarepaguá
Gol Linhas Aéreas	Brasília, Rio de Janeiro–Galeão, Salvador da Bahia
LATAM Brasil	Brasília, Porto Alegre (begins 22 February 2027)

=== Cargo ===
Airlines	Destinations
Atlas Air	Bogotá, Guadalajara, Lima, Miami, Quito, Santiago de Chile
Azul Logística	Ciudad del Este (begins 1 December 2026)
CMA CGM Air Cargo	Hong Kong
DHL Aviation	Bogotá, Miami
Ethiopian Airlines Cargo	Miami, Santiago de Chile
FedEx Express	Memphis
Modern Logistics	Rio de Janeiro–Galeão

== Statistics ==
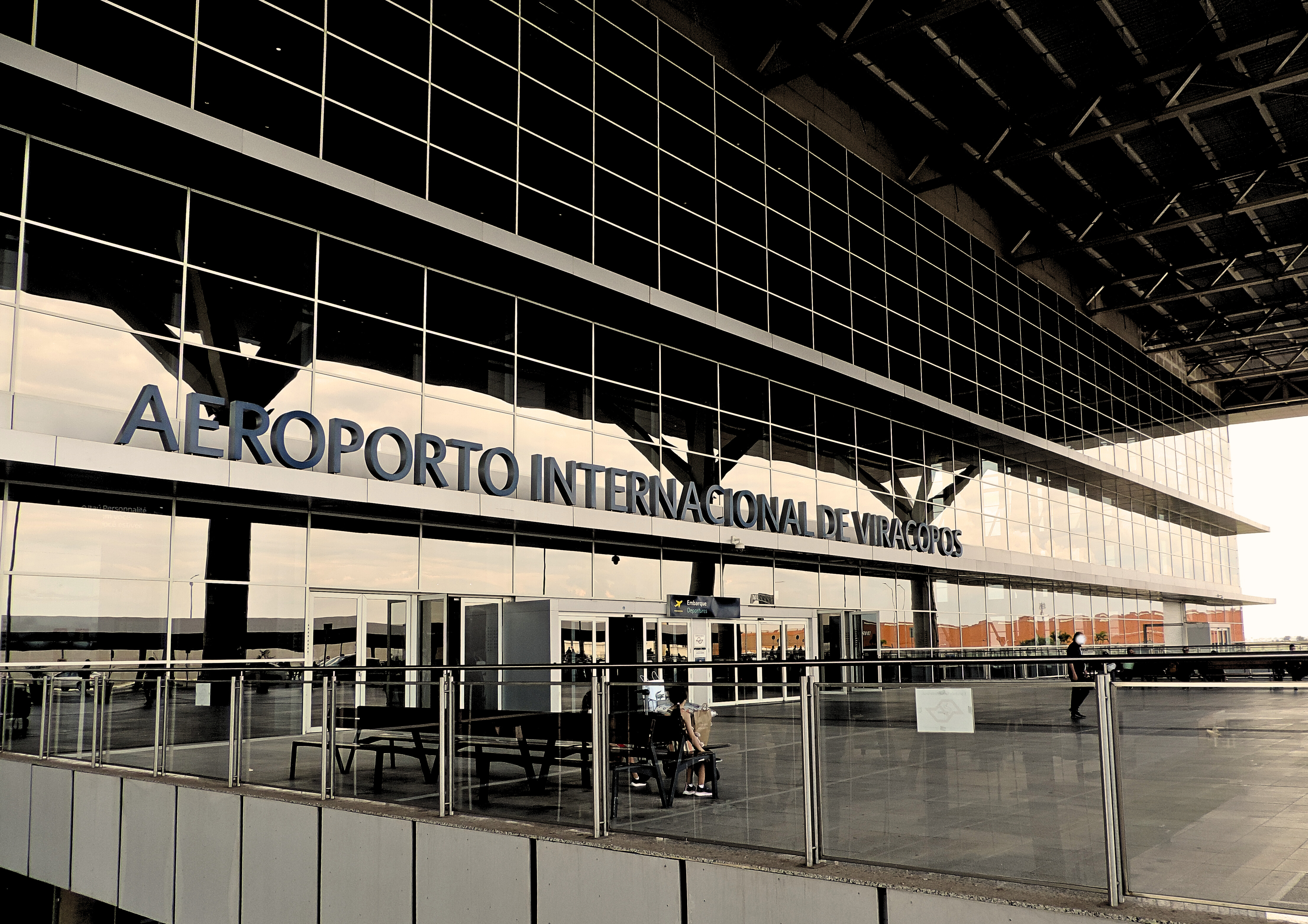
Viracopos entrance in 2025

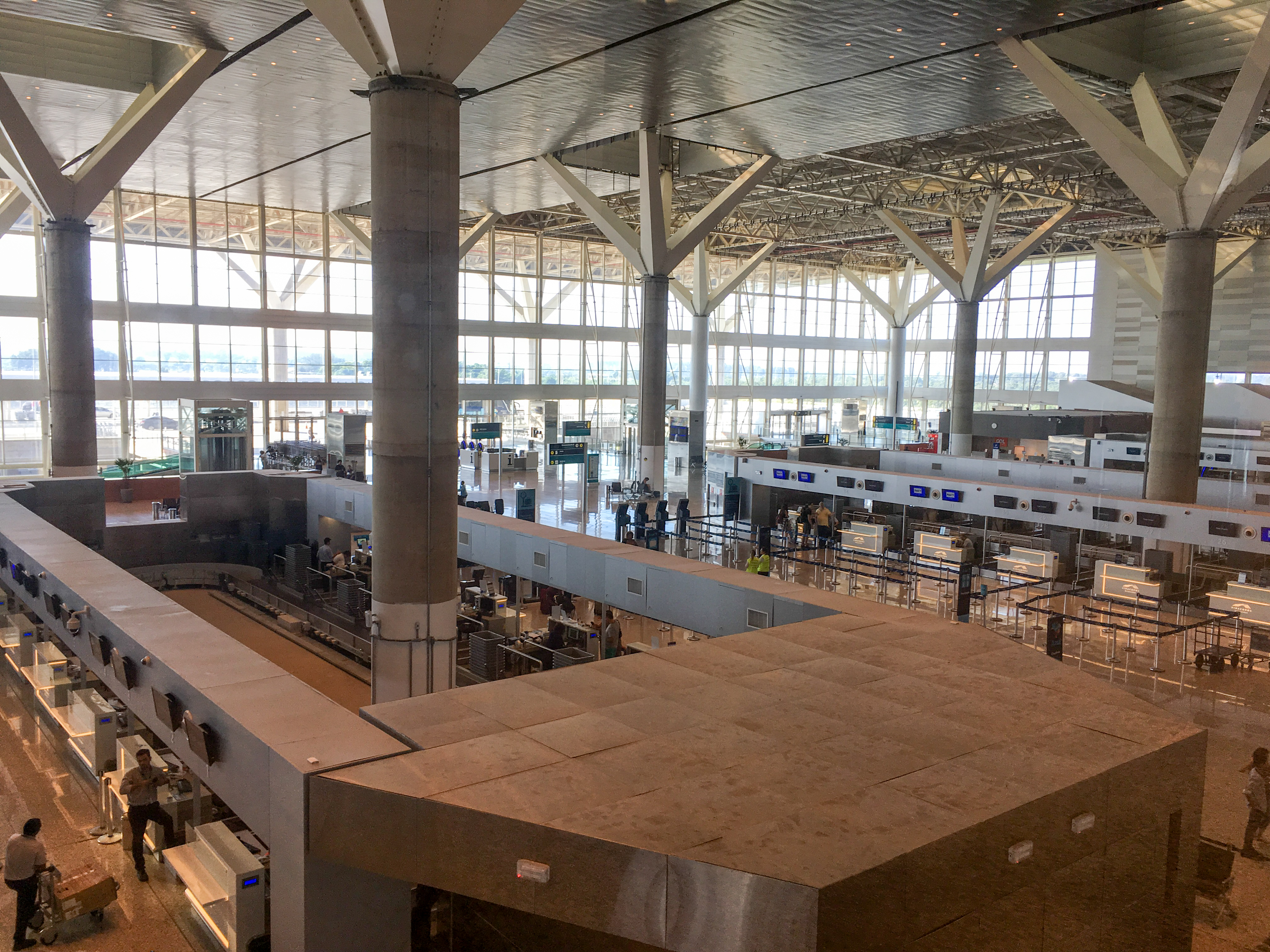
Check in area

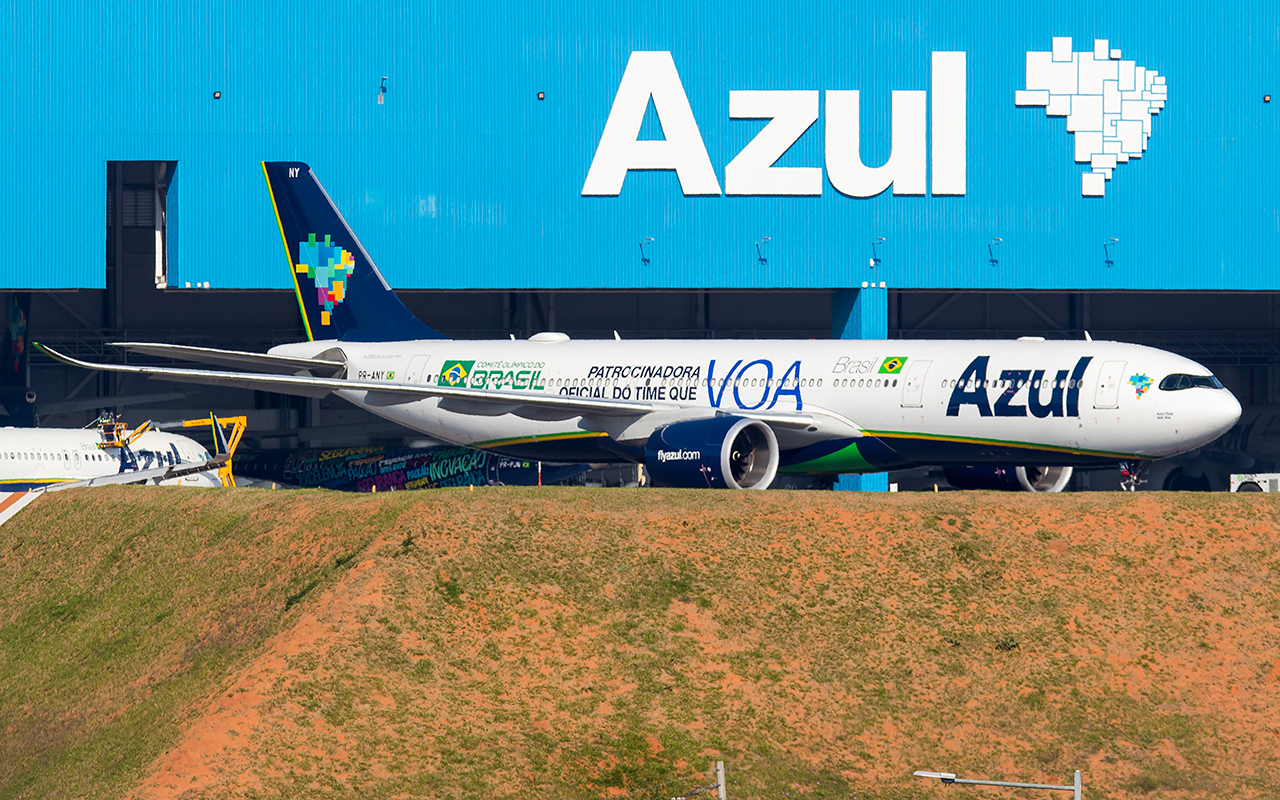
Viracopos Airport is a hub for Azul Brazilian Airlines

Following are the number of passenger, aircraft and cargo movements at the airport, according to Infraero (2007-2012) and Aeroportos Brasil (2013-2025) reports:

Year	Passenger	Aircraft	Cargo (t)
2025	12,826,553 ▲3%	124,613 ▲2%	271,711 ▼1%
2024	12,395,874 ▼1%	121,934 ▼3%	275,507 ▼6%
2023	12,524,219 ▲6%	125,857 ▼2%	294,094 ▼16%
2022	11,845,500 ▲18%	128,341 ▲22%	349,888 ▼2%
2021	10,045,361 ▲50%	105,320 ▲43%	357,368 ▲39%
2020	6,709,061 ▼37%	73,698 ▼36%	256,470 ▲18%
2019	10,585,018 ▲15%	114,459 ▲6%	216,447 ▼8%
2018	9,223,074 ▼1%	107,627 ▼1%	235,324 ▲18%
2017	9,332,631	108,635 ▼6%	198,876 ▲21%
2016	9,325,252 ▼10%	115,276 ▼10%	164,429 ▼7%
2015	10,324,658 ▲5%	127,395 ▼3%	177,285 ▼18%
2014	9,846,853 ▲6%	131,531 ▲3%	217,519 ▼8%
2013	9,295,349 ▲5%	127,252 ▲10%	235,182 ▼4%
2012	8,858,380 ▲17%	115,548 ▲16%	246,226 ▼8%
2011	7,568,384 ▲39%	99,982 ▲34%	267,946 ▲5%
2010	5,430,066 ▲61%	74,472 ▲35%	255,008 ▲38%
2009	3,364,404 ▲210%	55,261 ▲71%	184,745 ▼17%
2008	1,083,878 ▲8%	32,399 ▲11%	223,023 ▼3%
2007	1,006,059	29,226	229,402

== Accidents and incidents ==
- 23 November 1961: an Aerolíneas Argentinas de Havilland DH-106 Comet 4 registration LV-AHR operating flight 322 from Campinas-Viracopos to Port of Spain after reaching an altitude of about 100m lost altitude, collided with a eucalyptus forest and crashed. All 12 crew and 40 passengers on board were killed. The accident was attributed to pilot error.
- 26 September 1976: a Serv-Jet Learjet 25 struck trees during an instrument approach to runway 14 in heavy rain, and crashed 1500m short of the runway. All seven occupants died.
- 4 January 1977: a Transbrasil BAC One-Eleven 520FN landed heavy at VCP because of an improper flare, causing the aircraft to bounce and touchdown nose gear first, collapsing the nose gear and causing a runway excursion. There were no fatalities among the 42 passengers and crew on board, but the aircraft was written off.

== Access ==
The airport is located 82 km (51 mi) northwest of the state capital city of São Paulo and 20 km (12 mi) southwest of downtown Campinas, adjacent to the Bandeirantes-Anhanguera highway complex, which connects the capital city to the interior of São Paulo state.

== See also ==
- List of airports in Brazil
