= Equair =

Ecuadorian airline

IATA	ICAO	Call sign
HN	EQX	EQUINOX
- Founded: October 2020
- Commenced operations: January 10, 2022
- Ceased operations: September 30, 2023
- Hubs: Mariscal Sucre International Airport
- Frequent-flyer program: Cacao Miles
- Fleet size: 3
- Destinations: 6
- Headquarters: Quito, Ecuador
- Key people: Frederik Jacobsen and Gabriela Sommerfeld
- Website: www.equair.com.ec

EquinoxAir S.A.S, which operated under the Equair brand, was an airline headquartered in Quito, Ecuador. It operated domestic flights, between Quito, Guayaquil and the Galápagos Islands. The airline competed with the Ecuadorian subsidiaries of Avianca and LATAM, as well as Aeroregional.

== History ==
Equair was founded in October 2020 as EquinoxAir. It started its formation process with the authorities, and in March 2021 it got assigned some of the frequencies to the Baltra and San Cristóbal islands that TAME used to operate before its dissolution.

On November 16, 2021, the company was officially presented and the Equair brand was revealed in an event that took place in Centro de Convenciones Bicentenario, Quito.

On December 4, 2021, Equair received the first aircraft of its fleet, a Boeing 737-700. This aircraft was ferried from Lleida, Spain to Latacunga, Ecuador with stopovers in Reykjavík, Iceland and Boston, United States.

Equair was expected to have its inaugural flight, between Quito and Guayaquil on December 22, 2021, but was delayed to January 2022 due to a COVID-19 outbreak between the employees of the airline. Gabriela Sommerfeld was named as the CEO at the opening ceremony that was attended by Marcelo Cabrera who was the Minister of Transportation.

On January 7, 2022, the airline received its operation certificate from the Ecuadorian Civil Aviation General Directorate, after a demonstration flight to the Galápagos Islands was carried out. Then, on January 10, 2022, the airline had its inaugural flight between Quito and Guayaquil.

Equair introduced its frequent flyer program on May 17, 2022, under the "Cacao Miles" name. Besides accruing miles, the program offers discounts with affiliates and in-flight perks.

On September 30, 2023, Equair announced it was shutting down its operations with immediate effect, citing causes as the rising cost of fuel and a reduction in demand for national routes.

== Destinations ==
The airline focuses its operations on domestic flights.

Country	City	Airport	Notes	Refs
Curaçao	Willemstad	Curaçao International Airport	Charter	
Dominican Republic	Punta Cana	Punta Cana International Airport	Charter	
Ecuador	Baltra Island	Seymour Airport		
Ecuador	El Coca	Francisco de Orellana Airport		
Ecuador	Guayaquil	José Joaquín de Olmedo International Airport		
Ecuador	Quito	Mariscal Sucre International Airport	Hub	
Ecuador	San Cristóbal Island	San Cristóbal Airport		

== Fleet ==
In November 2022, the Equair fleet included three aircraft:

Equair fleet
Aircraft	In service	Orders	Passengers		Notes
Aircraft	In service	Orders	Y	Total	Notes
Boeing 737-700	3	—	142	142	
Total	3	—			

== See also ==
- List of airlines of Ecuador
