= List of the busiest airports in Ecuador =

This is a list of the busiest airports in Ecuador by passenger traffic and by aircraft movements.

== 2018 ==
=== Busiest airports by passenger traffic ===
Rank	Change	Airport	Location	Passengers	% Change
1	Steady	Mariscal Sucre International Airport	Quito	5.158.103	▲6,77%
2	Steady	José Joaquín de Olmedo International Airport	Guayaquil	3.731.232	▲4,84%
3	Steady	Seymour Airport	Baltra	520.799	▲7,99%
4	Steady	Mariscal Lamar International Airport	Cuenca	361.138	▲20,79%
5	▲1	San Cristóbal Airport	San Cristóbal	179.361	▲14,09%
6	▼1	Eloy Alfaro International Airport	Manta	165.951	▼ -5,55%
7	Steady	Francisco de Orellana Airport	Coca	112.195	▼ -8,80%
8	Steady	Ciudad de Catamayo Airport	Loja	112.062	▼ -5,32%
9	▲2	Lago Agrio Airport	Nueva Loja	47.780	▲7,97%
10	▼1	Colonel Carlos Concha Torres Airport	Esmeraldas	45.036	▼ -12,00%
11	▼1	Santa Rosa International Airport	Machala	38.682	▼ -20,95%
12	Steady	General Ulpiano Paez Airport	Salinas	2.082	▼ -58,98%

== 2017 ==
=== Busiest airports by passenger traffic ===
Rank	Change	Airport	Location	Passengers
1	Steady	Mariscal Sucre International Airport	Quito	4.831.256
2	Steady	José Joaquín de Olmedo International Airport	Guayaquil	3.559.106
3	Steady	Seymour Airport	Baltra	482.261
4	Steady	Mariscal Lamar International Airport	Cuenca	298.979
5	Steady	Eloy Alfaro International Airport	Manta	175.709
6	Steady	San Cristóbal Airport	San Cristóbal	157.210
7	Steady	Francisco de Orellana Airport	Coca	123.018
8	Steady	Ciudad de Catamayo Airport	Catamayo	118.358
9	Steady	Colonel Carlos Concha Torres Airport	Esmeraldas	51.175
10	Steady	Santa Rosa International Airport	Machala	48.932
11	Steady	Lago Agrio Airport	Nueva Loja	44.255
12	Steady	General Ulpiano Paez Airport	Salinas	5.002
13	Steady	Cotopaxi International Airport	Latacunga	539
