= Avianca Ecuador =

Ecuadorian domestic airline

Avianca Ecuador S.A.
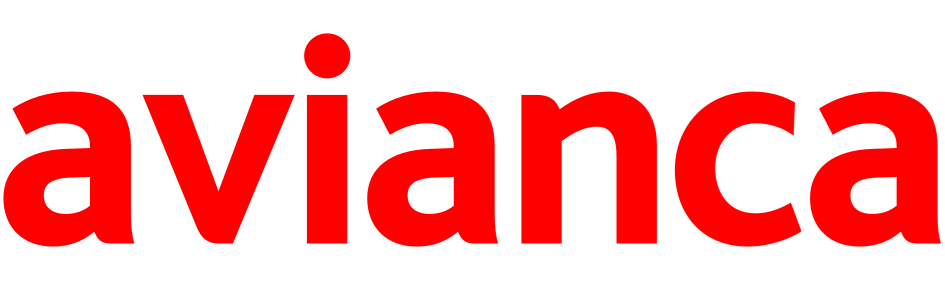

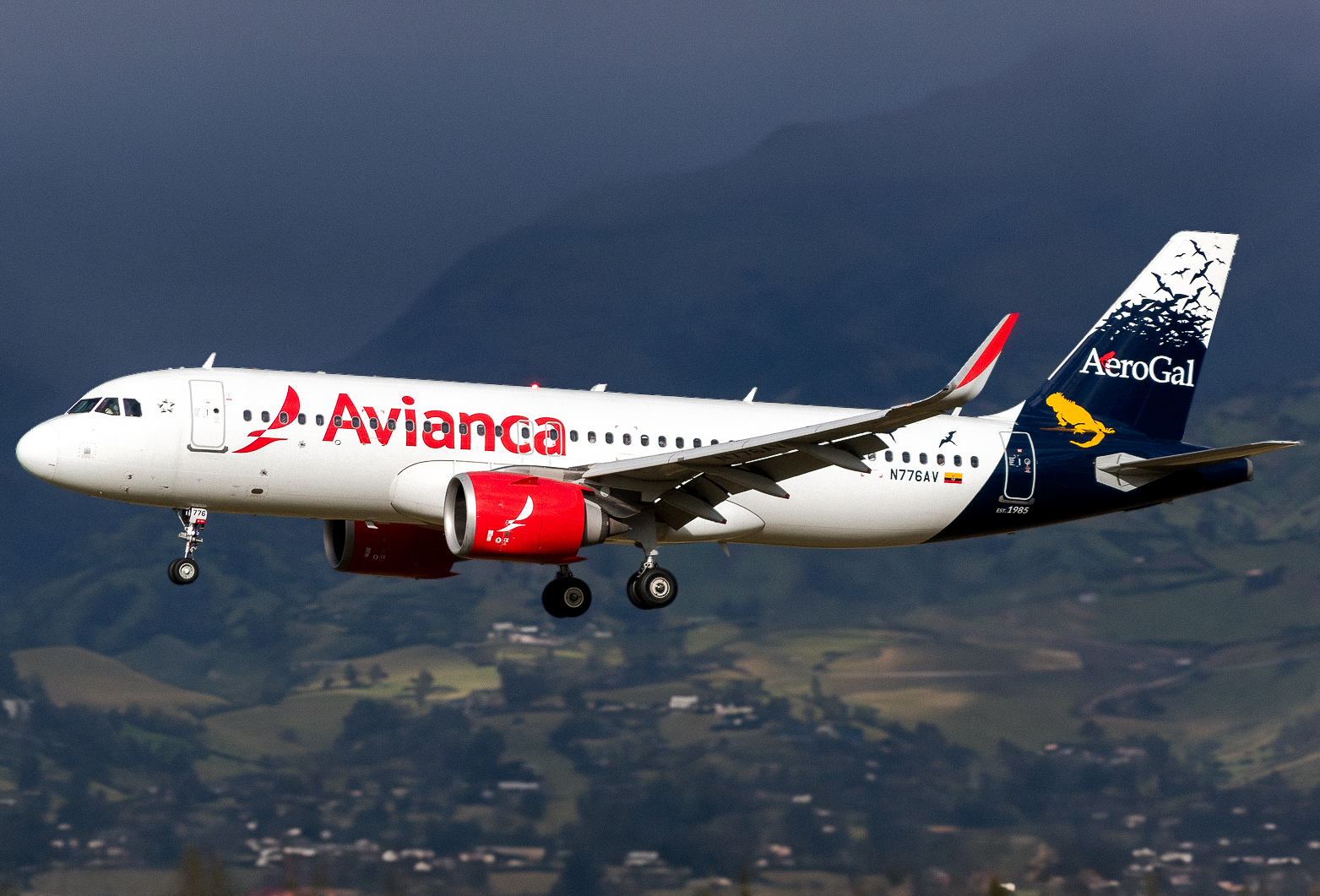
- Avianca Ecuador Airbus A320neo wearing a heritage livery of AeroGal
IATA	ICAO	Call sign
2K	GLG	GALAPAGOS
- Founded: November 1985; 41 years ago (as AeroGal)
- Hubs: Quito
- Secondary hubs: Guayaquil
- Frequent-flyer program: LifeMiles
- Alliance: Star Alliance (affiliate)
- Fleet size: 9
- Destinations: 16
- Parent company: Avianca Group
- Headquarters: Quito, Ecuador
- Key people: Frederico Pedreira (CEO)
- Founder: Carlos Serrano Lusetti
- Website: www.avianca.com

Avianca Ecuador S.A. (formerly known as AeroGal) is an airline based in Quito, Ecuador. It operates passenger and cargo flights within Ecuador, between the mainland and the Galápagos Islands, and between Ecuador and Colombia (on behalf of Avianca). It is one of the seven nationally branded airlines (Avianca Costa Rica, Avianca El Salvador, etc.) in the Avianca Group of Latin American airlines.

== History ==
AeroGal was founded in November 1985 by Ecuadorian businessman Carlos Serrano Lusetti to offer air transportation of passengers and cargo in Continental Ecuador and the Galapagos Archipelago. It began operating in 1986 with 2 Dornier Do 28s with a capacity for 12 passengers each.

In October 2009, AeroGal was 80% taken over by Synergy Group and announced its merger with Avianca and TACA Airlines. With the merger, the company expanded its connections to Europe. It also merged with Vuelos Internos Privados, being the first Ecuadorian company of this firm. The codes shared with this airline were still preserved in Aerogal's image, but since it merged with AviancaTaca Holding, it was part of the same company.

Avianca invested US$7.2 million to strengthen and modernize the company. Despite the purchase by Avianca, AeroGal continued using its separate identity until June 18, 2014, when the airline was renamed Avianca Ecuador and continues to operate in Ecuador. On June 18, 2014, AeroGal was renamed under the brand Avianca Ecuador, but the official name was not changed accordingly until early 2018, when the company was officially renamed Avianca Ecuador S.A.

On May 10, 2020, Avianca filed for Chapter 11 bankruptcy in the United States after failing to pay bondholders, becoming one of the major airlines to file for bankruptcy due to the COVID-19 pandemic crisis.

== Destinations ==
Avianca Ecuador serves the following destinations:

Country	City	Airport	Notes	Refs
Aruba	Oranjestad	Queen Beatrix International Airport		
Bolivia	Santa Cruz de la Sierra	Viru Viru International Airport	Terminated	
Bolivia	La Paz	El Alto International Airport		
Colombia	Bogotá	El Dorado International Airport		
Colombia	Cali	Alfonso Bonilla Aragón International Airport		
Colombia	Cartagena	Rafael Núñez International Airport	Terminated	
Colombia	Medellín	José María Córdova International Airport		
Curaçao	Willemstad	Curaçao International Airport	Terminated	
Dominican Republic	Punta Cana	Punta Cana International Airport		
Ecuador	Baltra Island	Seymour Airport		
Ecuador	Cuenca	Mariscal Lamar International Airport		
Ecuador	El Coca	Francisco de Orellana Airport	Terminated	
Ecuador	Guayaquil	José Joaquín de Olmedo International Airport	Hub	
Ecuador	Manta	Eloy Alfaro International Airport		
Ecuador	Nueva Loja	Lago Agrio Airport		
Ecuador	Quito	Mariscal Sucre International Airport	Hub	
Ecuador	San Cristóbal Island	San Cristóbal Airport		
Mexico	Cancún	Cancún International Airport	Terminated	
Panama	Panama City	Tocumen International Airport		
Peru	Lima	Jorge Chávez International Airport		
United States	Miami	Miami International Airport		
United States	New York City	John F. Kennedy International Airport		
United States	Orlando	Orlando International Airport	Terminated	

=== Interline agreements ===
- Air Canada
- APG Airlines
- Hahn Air

== Fleet ==
=== Current fleet ===
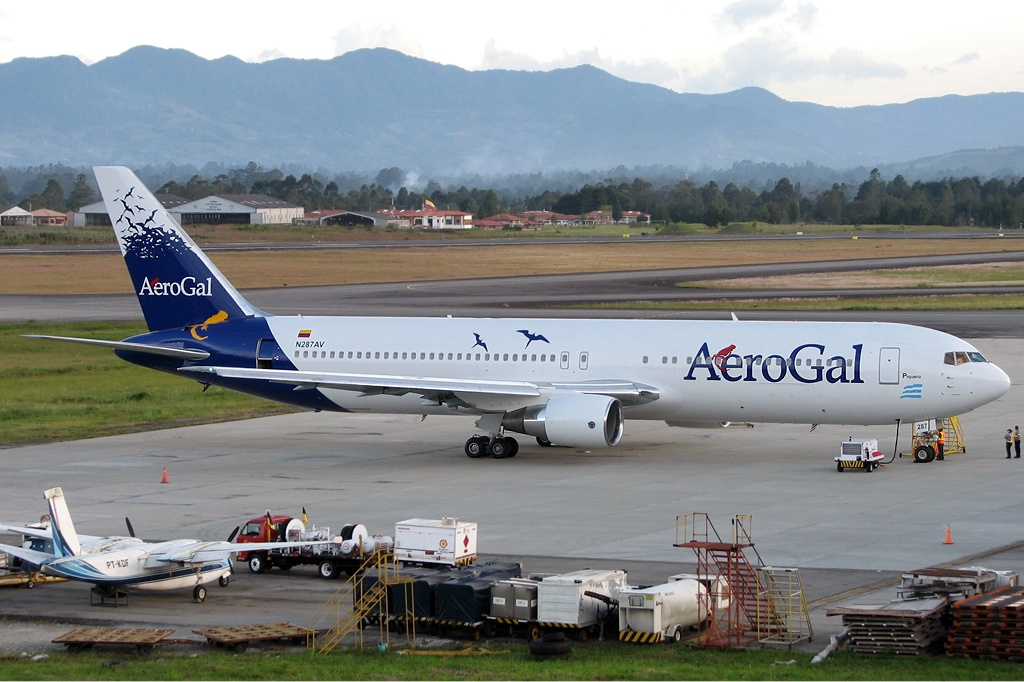
AeroGal's only Boeing 767-300ER parked at José María Córdova International Airport in 2009

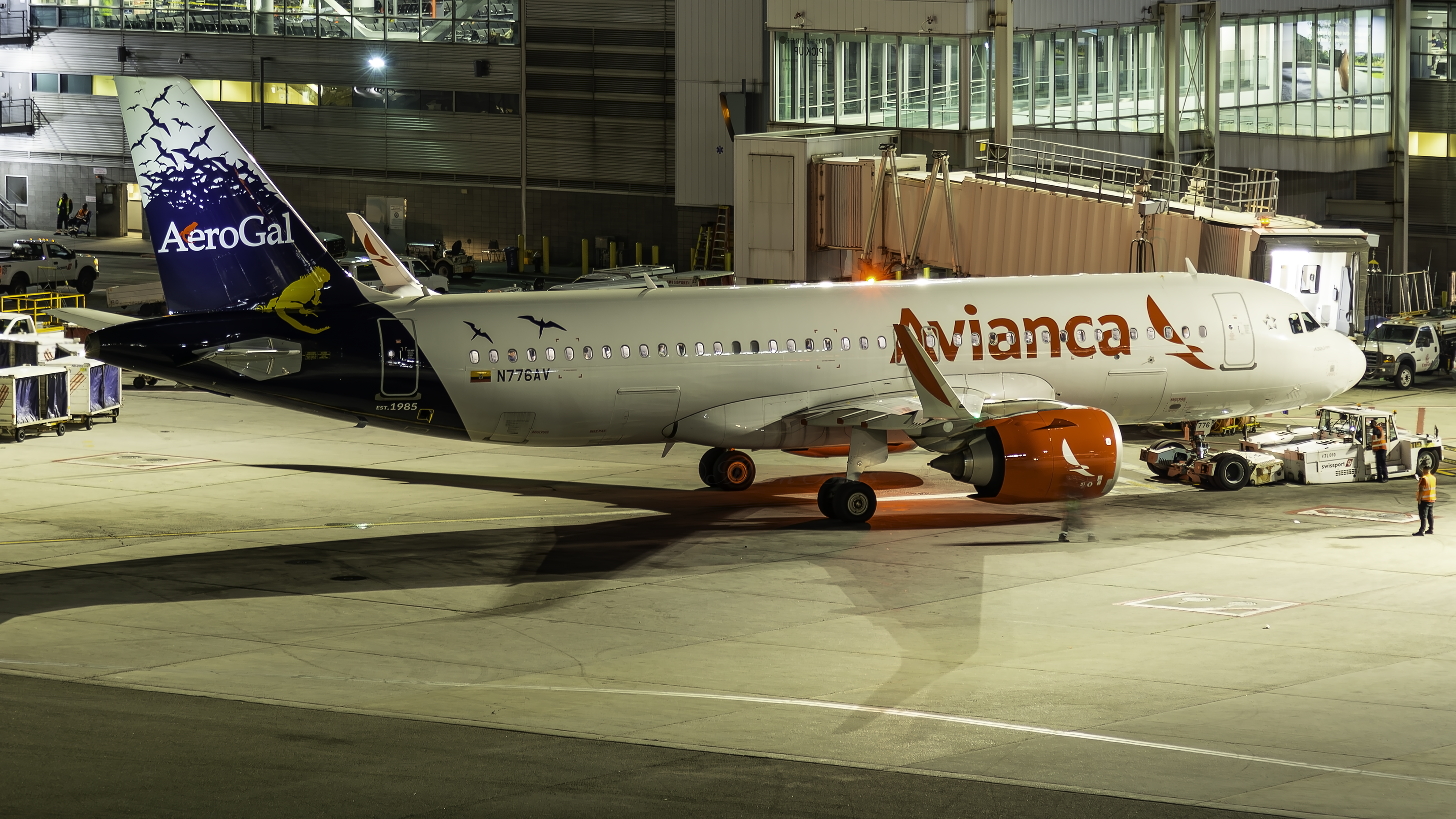
Avianca Ecuador Airbus A320

As of July 2026, Avianca Ecuador operates the following aircraft:

Avianca Ecuador fleet
Aircraft	In service	Orders	Passengers				Notes
Aircraft	In service	Orders	W	Y+	Y	Total	Notes
Airbus A320	5	—	12	60	108	180	
Airbus A320neo	4	—	12	60	108	180	
Total	9	—					

=== Former fleet ===
As of August 2025, Avianca Ecuador operated 2 Airbus A319 (To be retired by 2024), 6 Airbus A320 and 5 Airbus A320neo.

As AeroGal, the airline previously operated the following aircraft:

Avianca Ecuador former fleet
Aircraft	Total	Introduced	Retired	Notes
Boeing 727-200	2	2002	2007	
Boeing 737-200	9	2003	2011	
Boeing 737-300	2	2008	2012	
Boeing 757-200	2	2008	2012	
Boeing 767-300ER	1	2009	2012	Leased from Avianca
Dornier Do 28	2	1986	Unknown	
Douglas C-54 Skymaster	1	1988	1990	
Fairchild F-27	2	1993	1996	
Fairchild Hiller FH-227D	2	1995	2002	

== Accidents and incidents ==
- On October 28, 1997, a Fairchild Hiller FH-227D (registered HC-BUF) was carrying company staff and equipment to the provisional operations base at Ambato. The approach was flown at 100 knots. The touchdown was very late, with just 900 meters of the runway remaining. A fine ground pitch was selected, but the aircraft overran the runway and fell into a deep ravine. All seven occupants survived with various injuries.
- On May 2, 2009, a Boeing 757-200 (registered HC-CHC) was taking off from José Joaquín de Olmedo International Airport, when its right engine suffered repeated compressor stalls and lost power. The crew reduced the thrust on that engine to idle, leveled off, and returned to Guayaquil for a safe landing about 13 minutes later.
- On September 19, 2010, AeroGal's Boeing 767-300ER (registered HC-CIJ) was involved in a near-miss at John F. Kennedy International Airport. Initial reports by the NTSB indicated that the flight was cleared to land on runway 13L, but instead attempted to land on runway 13R. The runway was used by a JetBlue aircraft cleared for takeoff. The error was spotted by a Delta crew in line for takeoff, who relayed the information to the tower. The air traffic controller issued an order for the flight to turn immediately and was able to prevent the collision.

== See also ==
- List of airlines of Ecuador
