= LGQ =

LGQ or lgq may refer to:

- LGQ, the IATA code for Lago Agrio Airport, Nueva Loja, Ecuador
- lgq, the ISO 639-3 code for Logba language, Ghana
