= Flight 422 =

Flight 422 may refer to:

- Air France Flight 422, a flight which crashed near Bogotá, Colombia, in 1998
- Kuwait Airways Flight 422, a flight hijacked over the Gulf of Oman in 1988, leading to one of the longest skyjackings on record
  - Flight 422, Kuwaiti television series based on the 1988 incident
- Merpati Nusantara Airlines Flight 422, a 1994 flight that overshot the runway at Indonesia's Achmad Yani International Airport
