= Mariscal Sucre International Airport =

Airport serving Quito, Ecuador

Mariscal Sucre International Airport Aeropuerto Internacional Mariscal Sucre
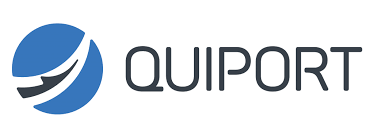

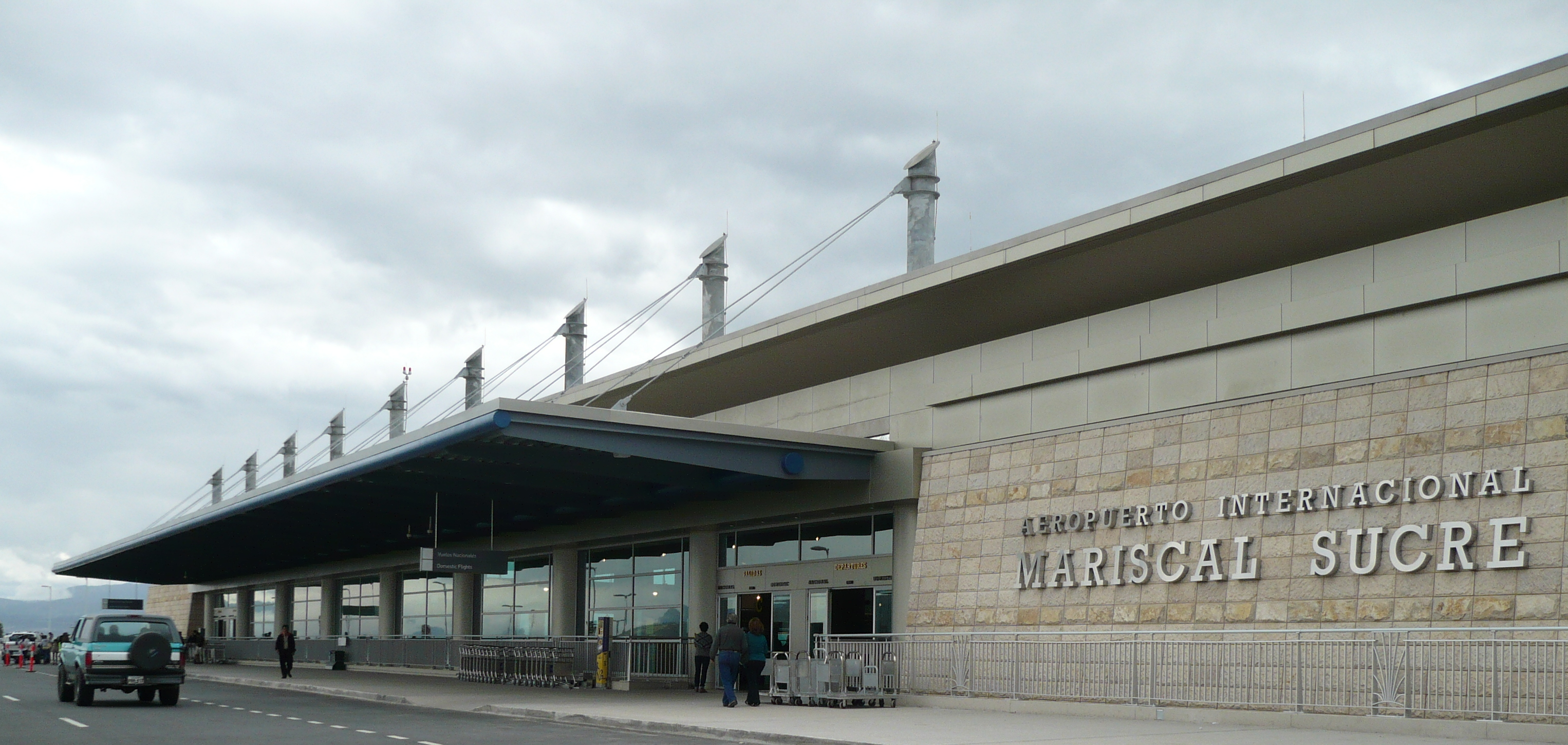
- IATA: UIO; ICAO: SEQM

Summary
- Airport type: Public
- Operator: Quiport, CORPAQ
- Serves: Quito
- Location: Tababela, Quito Canton, Pichincha, Ecuador
- Opened: February 20, 2013; 13 years ago
- Hub for: Avianca Ecuador; LATAM Ecuador
- Focus city for: Avianca
- Elevation AMSL: 2,400 m (7,900 ft)
- Coordinates: 0°06′48″S 78°21′31″W
- Website: www.aeropuertoquito.com www.aeropuertoquito.aero

Map
- Location of airport in Ecuador

Runways
Direction	Length		Surface
Direction	m	ft	Surface
18/36	4,100	13,451	Pavement

Statistics (2022)
- Passenger movements: 4,300,000

Mariscal Sucre International Airport (IATA: UIO, ICAO: SEQM) is an international airport serving Quito, Ecuador. It is the busiest airport in Ecuador. It is located in the Tababela parish, about 18 kilometres (11 mi) east of Quito, and because of its location it is also colloquially known as Tababela Airport. The airport currently serves as the main hub for Avianca Ecuador and the largest hub for LATAM Ecuador. It also served as the main hub for TAME, Ecuador's flag-carrier, before the airline was liquidated by the Ecuadorian government in 2020. The airport opened in February 2013 and replaced the 53-year old airport of the same name. The airport is named after independence leader Antonio José de Sucre. It was the first 5-star airport in the Western Hemisphere as rated by Skytrax.

The new Mariscal Sucre Int'l Airport covers 1,500 hectares (3,707 acres) which is ten times larger than the airport it replaced.

== Location ==
The new Quito International Airport is located on the Oyambaro plain near the town of Tababela, about 18 kilometers (11 mi) east of Quito, Ecuador. The location was chosen in order to expand the capacity of the city's airport.

The old airport posed enormous risks because it was located in the middle of a mountainous city with high wind currents. It could no longer be expanded to accommodate larger aircraft or increased air traffic, and had been the scene of numerous incidents and crashes during the latter years of its operation.

== History ==
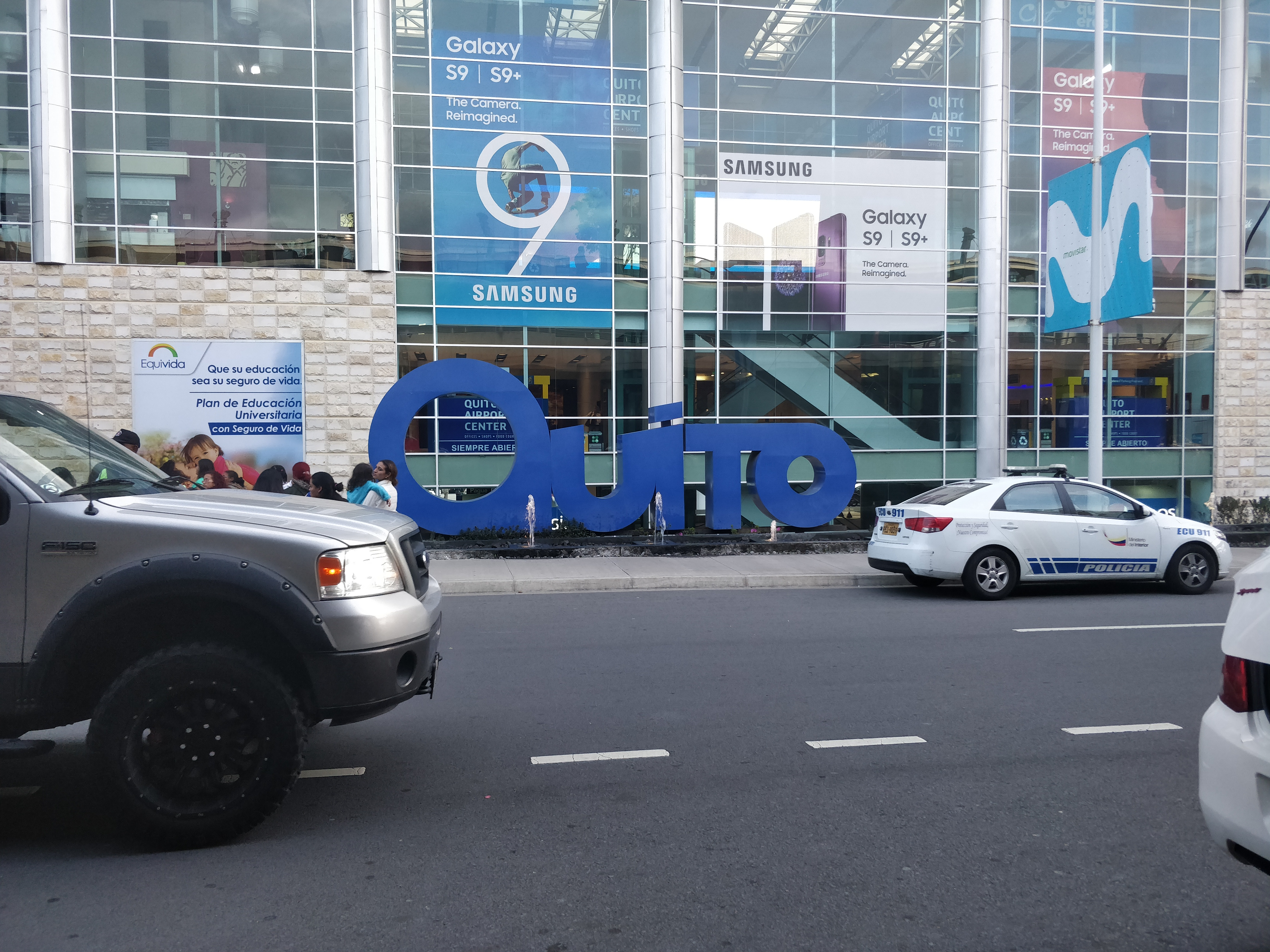
A loading zone outside the airport

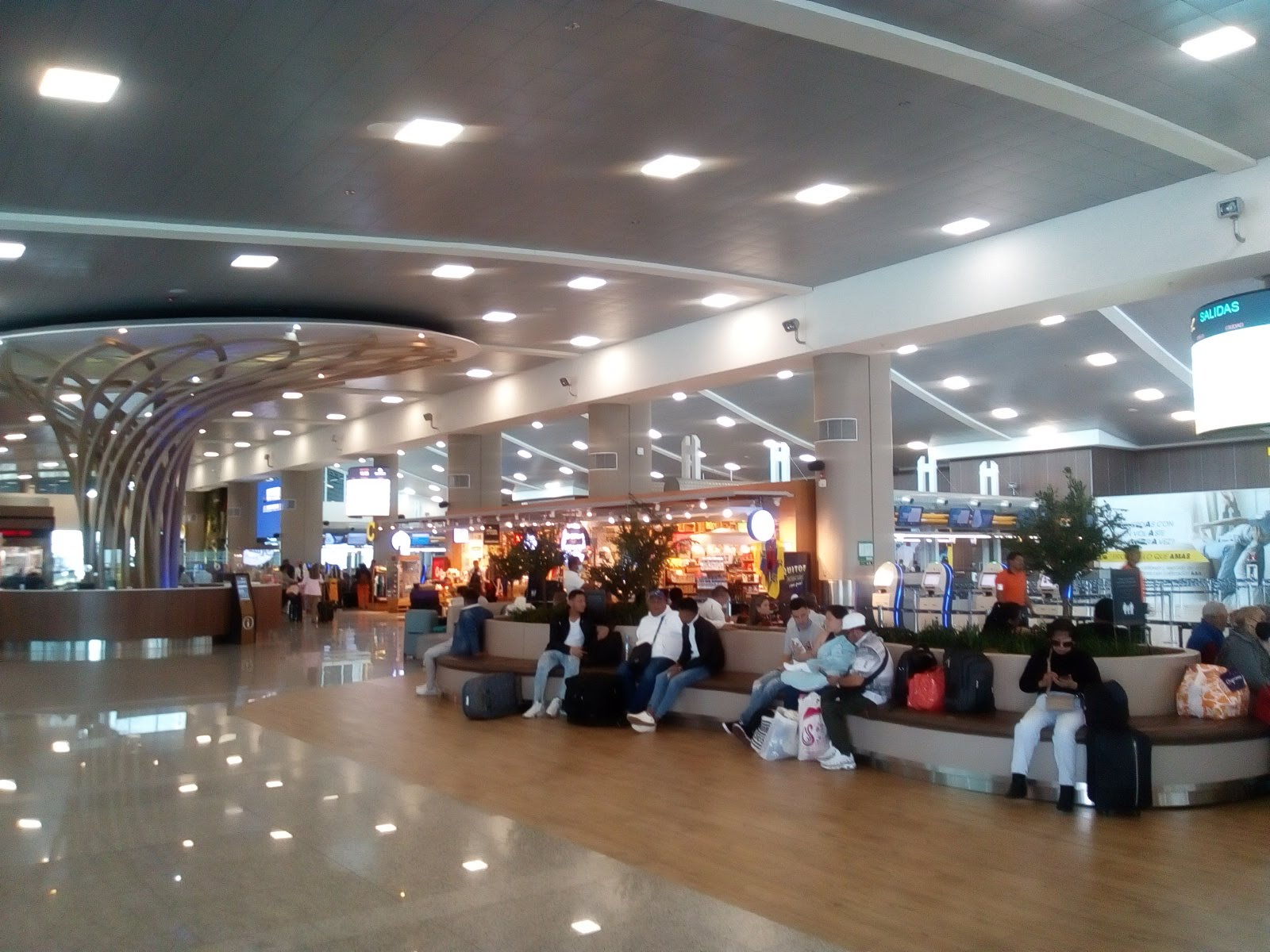
Check-in and departures area

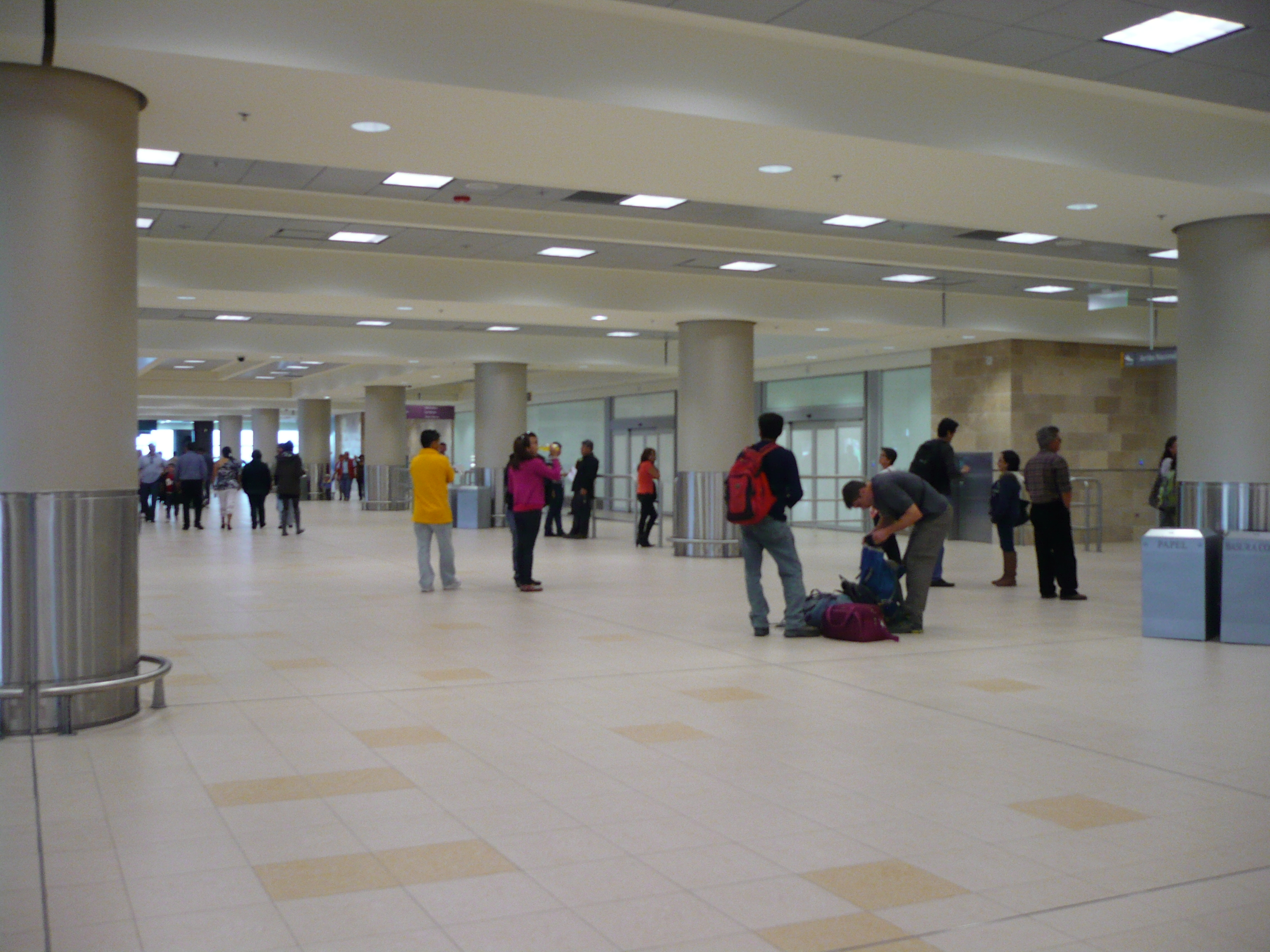
Arrivals area

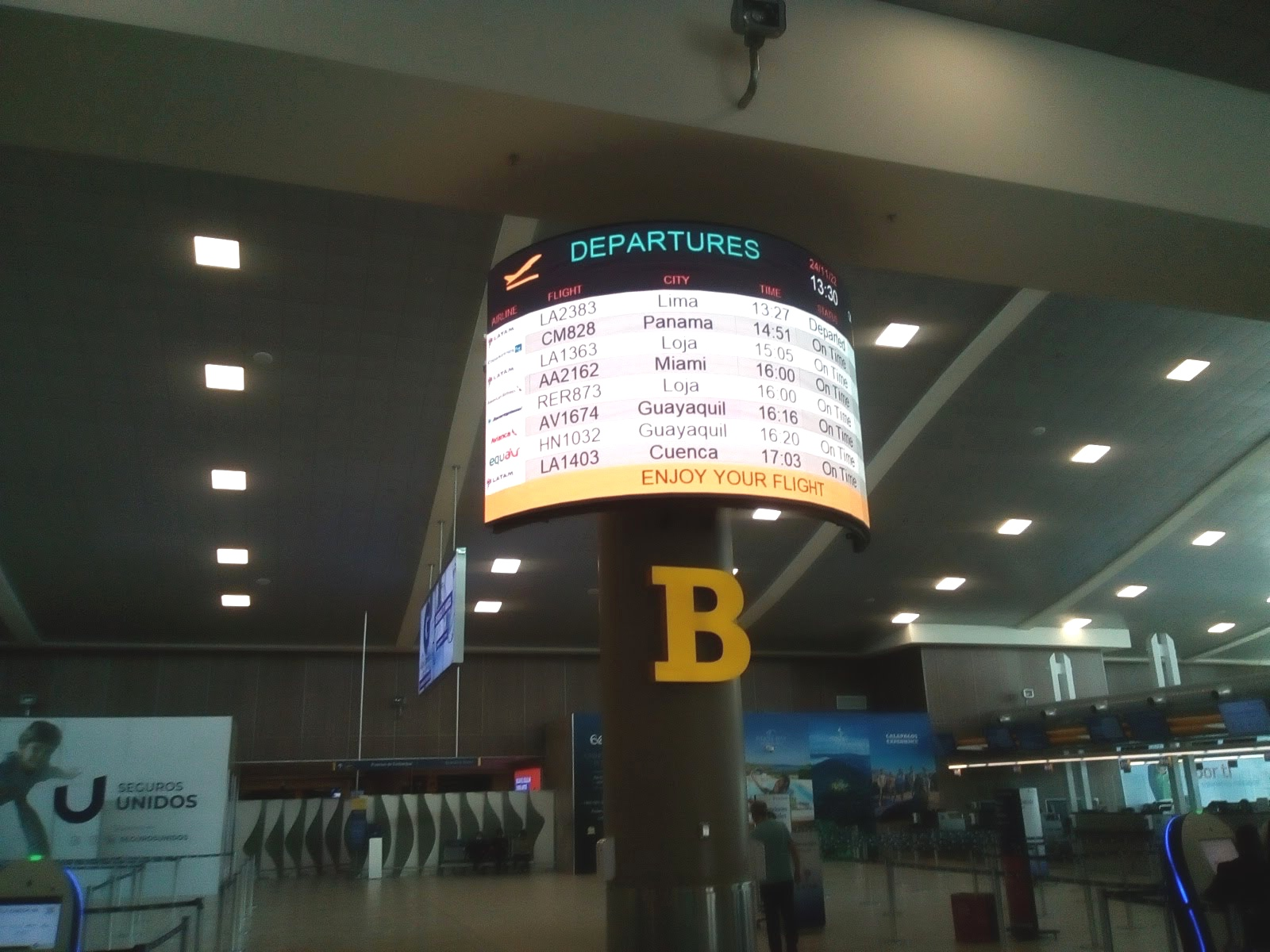
Departures screen

Boarding gates

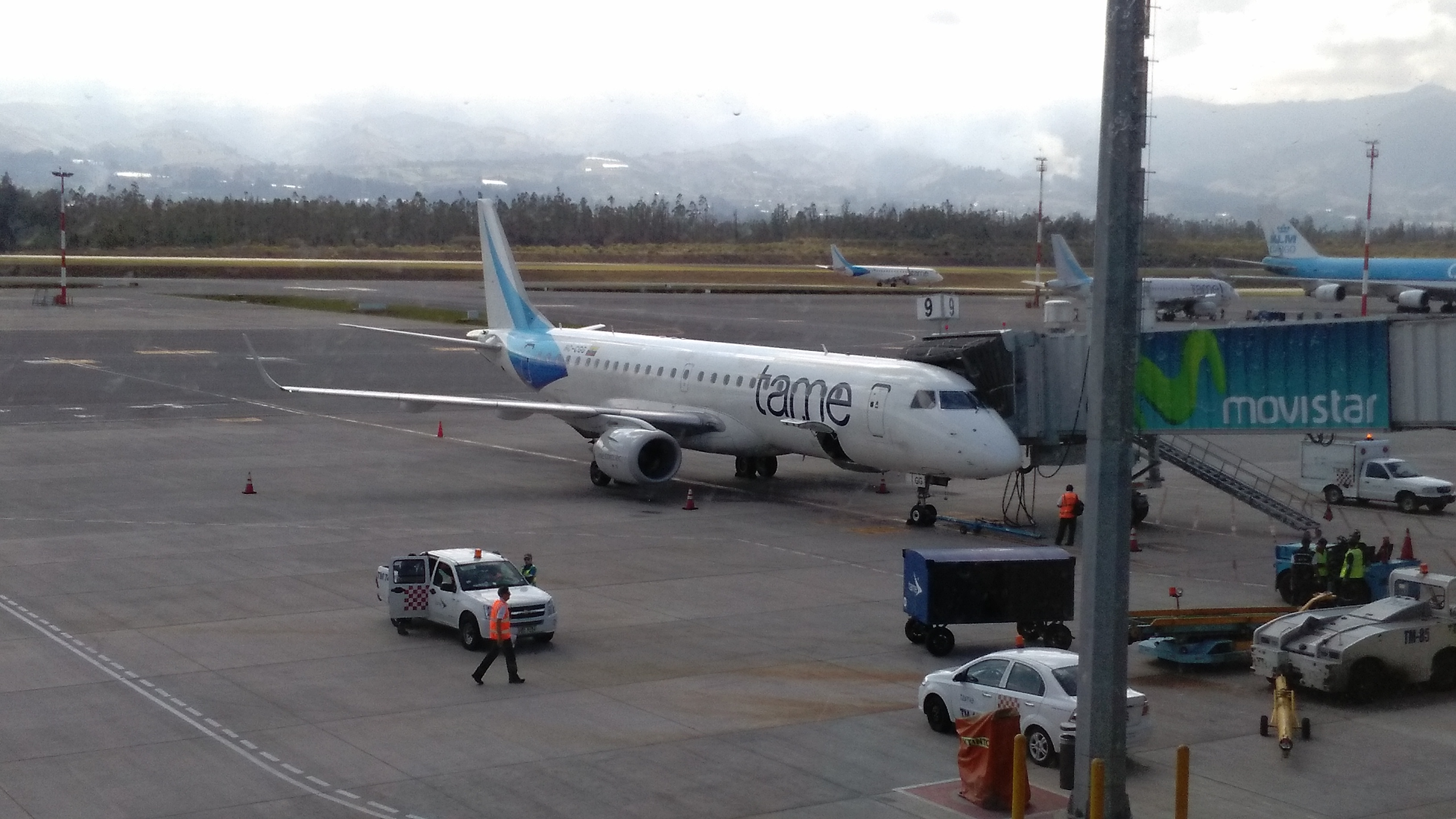
TAME Embraer 190

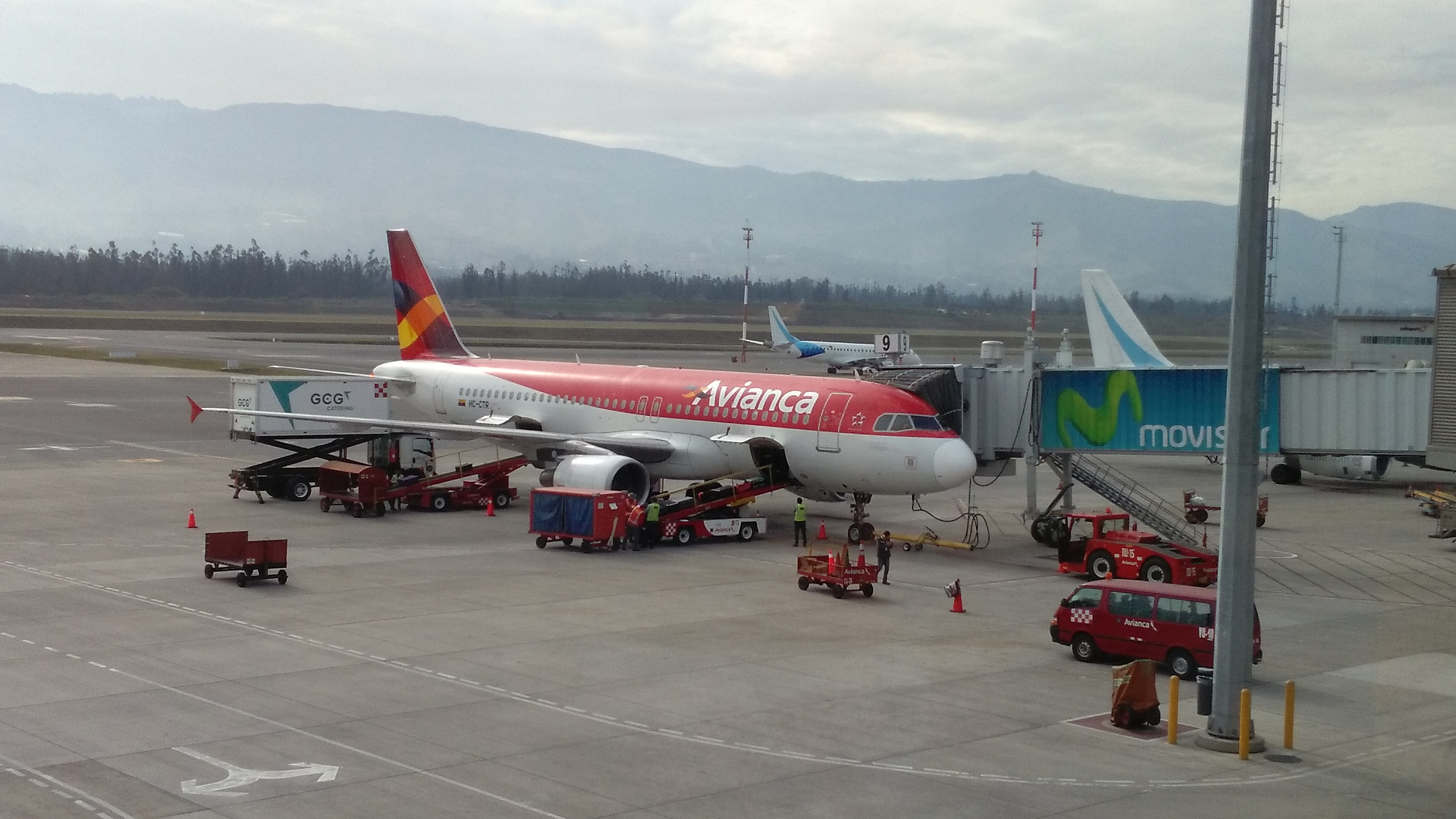
Avianca Airbus A320

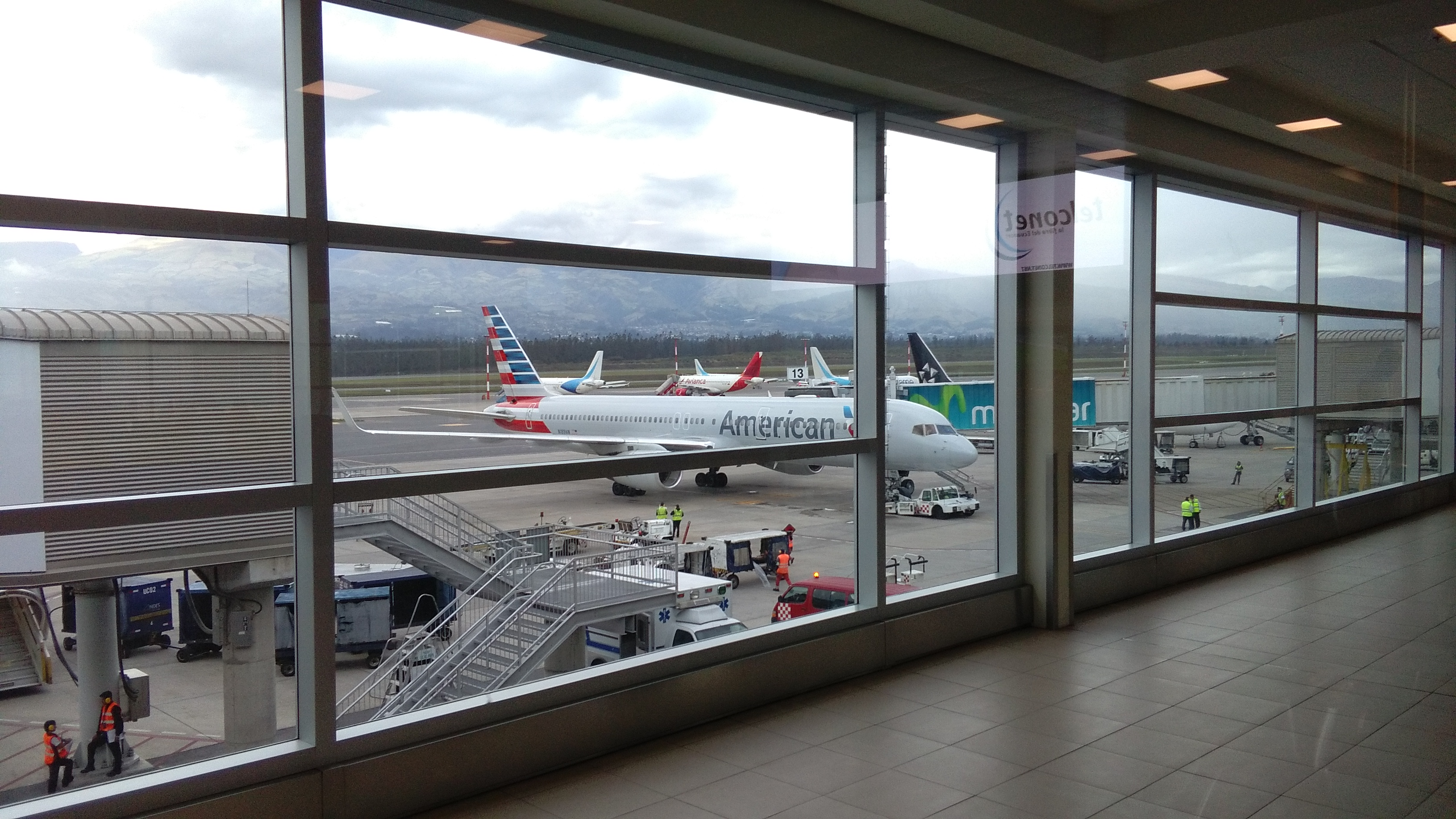
View from the international terminal

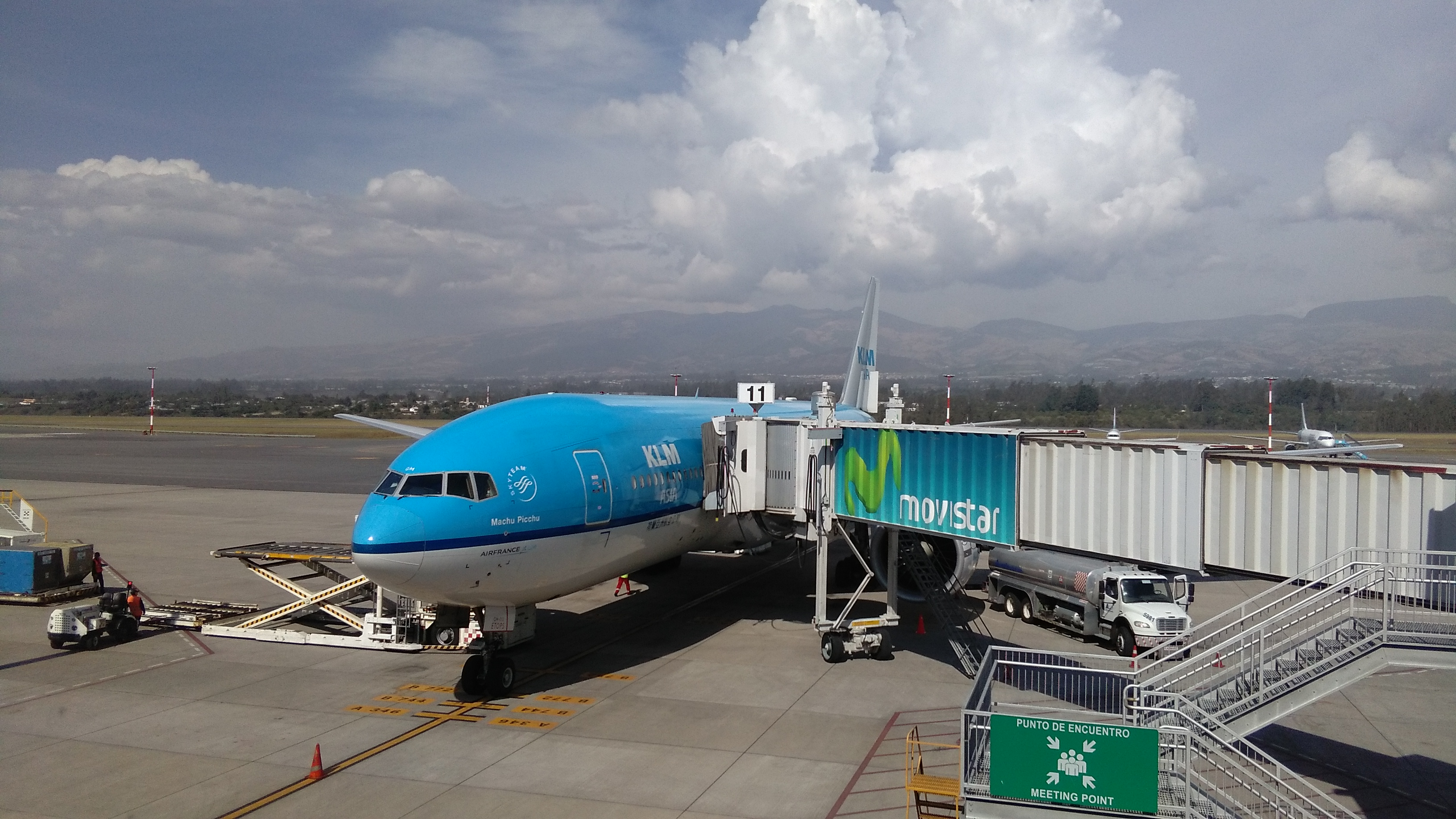
KLM flies daily to Quito and Guayaquil using the Boeing 777

Construction began in 2006. A re-negotiation of the financing contract for the airport was signed on 9 August 2010.

As part of final certification steps for the airport, Quito's mayor Augusto Barrera and around 100 other passengers left an early morning flight from nearby Mariscal Sucre International Airport on an American Airlines Boeing 757 on July 2, 2012.

The inaugural flight allowed officials to test the performance of check-in counters and other systems. The flight lasted nine minutes and the plane was met by a water cannon salute at the new airport.

The official inauguration was postponed from October 2012, citing the progress of improvements to various access routes, the holiday season, and other factors. The new airport commenced operations on 20 February 2013 following the closure of the old airport the night before. The first flights scheduled to arrive at the new airport were TAME flight 302 from Guayaquil (domestic), and LAN flight 2590 from Lima, Peru (international). Arrival times were scheduled for 9:00 and 9:30 a.m. respectively.

== Airlines and destinations ==
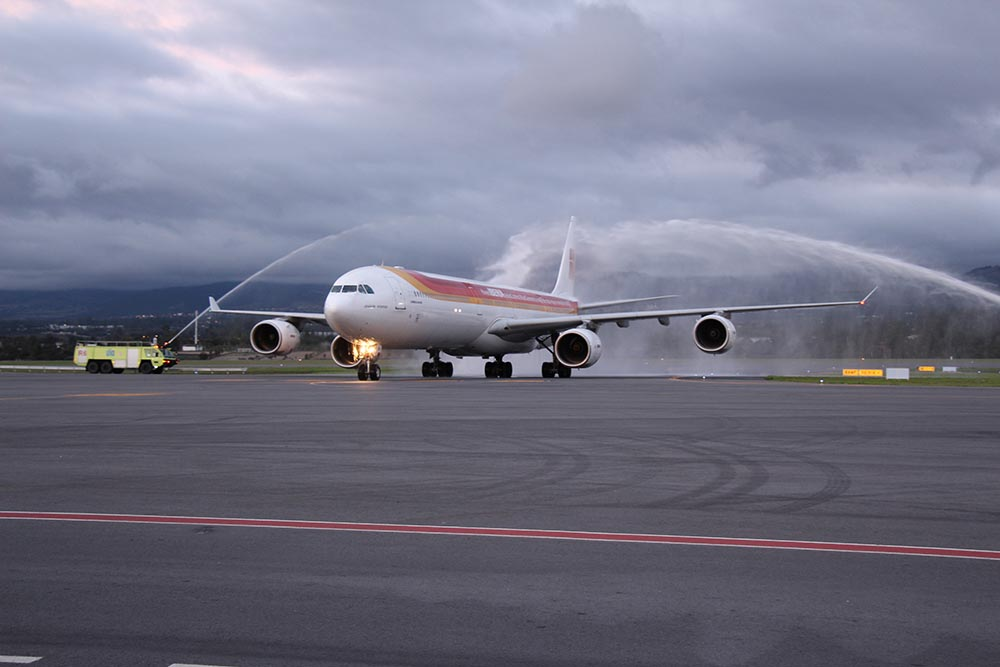
Iberia Airbus A340-600 aircraft on its inaugural flight to Quito - Mariscal Sucre International Airport from Barajas on the 28th of October, 2013. This picture was taken after the first transatlantic flight of the airport linking it to Europe non stop had landed,and it was celebrated with the traditional water cannon salute.

=== Passenger ===
Airlines	Destinations
Aeroméxico	Mexico City–Benito Juárez
Aeroregional	Coca, Cuenca, Guayaquil, Lima, Loja, Machala, Manta, Río Hato; Charter: Maracaibo, Punta Cana
Air Canada	Seasonal: Montréal–Trudeau (begins December 5, 2026), Toronto–Pearson (begins December 6, 2026)
Air Europa	Madrid
American Airlines	Miami
Arajet	Punta Cana
Avianca	Bogotá
Avianca Costa Rica	San José (CR)
Avianca Ecuador	Baltra, Bogotá, Buenos Aires–Ezeiza, Cuenca, Guayaquil, Manta, Medellín–JMC, New York–JFK, Punta Cana, San Cristóbal
Avianca El Salvador	San Salvador
Copa Airlines	Panama City–Tocumen
Delta Air Lines	Atlanta
Iberia	Madrid
JetSmart Perú	Lima
KLM	Amsterdam, Guayaquil
LATAM Chile	Santiago de Chile (resumes December 1, 2026)
LATAM Ecuador	Bogotá, Coca, Cuenca, Guayaquil, Manta, Miami, San Cristóbal
LATAM Perú	Lima
United Airlines	Houston–Intercontinental

Notes:

- ^{1}: KLM's flight from Quito to Amsterdam makes a stop in Guayaquil.

=== Cargo ===
Airlines	Destinations
Aerosucre	Bogota
Air Canada Cargo	Miami, Montréal–Trudeau, Toronto–Pearson
Atlas Air	Campinas, Manaus, Mexico City–AIFA, Miami, New York–JFK, São Paulo–Guarulhos
Avianca Cargo	Bogotá, Medellín–JMC, Miami
Cargolux	Bogotá, Luxembourg
Emirates SkyCargo	Aguadilla, Miami
Ethiopian Airlines Cargo	Addis Ababa, Bogotá, Chongqing, Miami
FedEx Express	Memphis, Miami
LATAM Cargo Chile	Santiago de Chile
Martinair	Amsterdam
Qatar Airways Cargo	Doha, Liège, Miami
UPS Airlines	Miami

According to Corporación Quiport's 2024 Sustainability Report, Mariscal Sucre International Airport handled approximately 364,674 metric tons of cargo during 2024, ranking fifth in air cargo in Latin America and the Caribbean. Approximately 300,943 metric tons of export cargo departed Quito during the year, and approximately 92 percent of export air cargo consisted of flowers, reinforcing the airport's importance within Ecuador's agricultural export economy.

== Statistics ==
=== Annual traffic ===
Passenger statistics
Year	Total passengers	Cargo (TM)
2001	400,900	
2002	577,800	9,990.10
2003	609,900	10,000.80
2004	795,600	21,590.55
2005	825,300	26,556.20
2006	955,500	30,010.50
2007	1,771,859	35,256.40
2008	2,569,800	40,123.65
2009	3,000,560	40,996.60
2010	4,026,521	50,023.65
2011	5,000,500	70,785.09
2012	5,120,000	164,412.03
2013	5,421,106	215,036.88
2014	5,574,019	300,090.90
2015	5,376,544	301,400.10
2016	4,852,530	303,460.90
2017	4,875,166	312,112.90
2018	5,158,103	-
2019	5,037,650	-
2020	683,629	-
2021	1,198,780	-
2022	4,300,000	-

=== Top destinations ===
Busiest international routes (roundtrip) out of Mariscal Sucre International Airport (2020)
Rank	Change	City	Passengers	% Change	Top carriers
1	Steady	Panama City, Panama	103.710	▼ -74,73%	Copa Airlines
2	Steady	Bogotá, Colombia	92.107	▼ -76,28%	Avianca, Avianca Ecuador, Wingo
3	▲1	Madrid, Spain	85.815	▼ -66,32%	Air Europa, Iberia, Plus Ultra Líneas Aéreas
4	▲1	Miami, United States	81.952	▼ -61,61%	American Airlines
5	▼2	Lima, Peru	53.609	▼ -79,45%	Avianca Ecuador, LATAM Ecuador
6	Steady	Mexico City, Mexico	53.410	▼ -64,39%	Aeroméxico, Interjet
7	▲3	Houston, United States	42.897	▼ -49,39%	United Airlines
8	▲1	Amsterdam, Netherlands	33.243	▼ -67,22%	KLM
9	▼1	Fort Lauderdale, United States	32.166	▼ -72,85%	JetBlue Airways
10	▼3	Atlanta, United States	28.250	▼ -77,99%	Delta Air Lines

Busiest domestic routes from Mariscal Sucre International Airport (2020)
Rank	Change	City	Passengers	% Change	Top carriers
1	Steady	(Guayas Province) Guayaquil, Guayas	411.923	▼ -69,72%	Aeroregional, Avianca Ecuador, LATAM Ecuador, TAME
2	Steady	(Azuay Province) Cuenca, Azuay	113.817	▼ -69,04%	Aeroregional, LATAM Ecuador, TAME
3	Steady	(Galápagos Province) Baltra Island, Galápagos Islands	74.295	▼ -73,07%	Avianca Ecuador, LATAM Ecuador, TAME
4	Steady	(Manabí Province) Manta, Manabí	42.532	▼ -72,39%	Avianca Ecuador, LATAM Ecuador, TAME
5	Steady	(Loja Province) Loja, Loja	41.188	▼ -62,47%	Aeroregional, TAME
6	Steady	(Orellana Province) El Coca, Orellana	33.703	▼ -68,03%	Avianca Ecuador, LATAM Ecuador, TAME
7	Steady	(Galápagos Province) San Cristóbal, Galápagos Islands	22.219	▼ -72,04%	Avianca Ecuador, LATAM Ecuador, TAME
8	▲1	(El Oro Province) Machala, El Oro	9.143	▼ -78,75%	TAME
9	▼1	(Sucumbíos Province) Lago Agrio, Sucumbíos	6.502	▼ -85,41%	TAME
10	Steady	(Esmeraldas Province) Esmeraldas, Esmeraldas	4.527	▼ -88,44%	TAME

== See also ==
- Transport in Ecuador
- List of airports in Ecuador
