= LATAM Airlines Ecuador =

Ecuadorian airline

LATAM Ecuador
IATA	ICAO	Call sign
XL	LNE	LAN ECUADOR
- Founded: July 2002; 24 years ago
- Commenced operations: 23 April 2003; 23 years ago
- AOC #: E1QF037F
- Hubs: Guayaquil; Quito
- Frequent-flyer program: LATAM Pass
- Alliance: Oneworld (affiliate; 2007–2020)
- Fleet size: 11
- Destinations: 9
- Parent company: LATAM Airlines Group (45%)
- Headquarters: Quito, Ecuador
- Key people: Daniel Leng (CEO)
- Website: www.latamairlines.com

Aerolane Líneas Aéreas Nacionales del Ecuador S.A. d/b/a LATAM Airlines Ecuador (formerly LAN Ecuador) is a subsidiary of LATAM Airlines Group of Chile, based in Quito, Ecuador. It is owned by Translloyd (55%) and LATAM Airlines (45%).

== History ==
LATAM Ecuador was established in July 2002 as LAN Ecuador and started operations on 23 April 2003 with two Boeing 767-300ERs operated by LAN Airlines.

In 2007, the airline became a member of the Oneworld alliance as a subsidiary of LAN Airlines. On 24 December 2008, LAN Ecuador received approval to begin domestic operations, which were launched by 6 April 2009, with the Airbus A318.

On 26 May 2020, LATAM filed for Chapter 11 bankruptcy in the United States due to economic problems attributed to the impact of the COVID-19 pandemic on aviation, although they are currently operating and have been negotiating terms. In August, the company announced its second-quarter results, projecting improved operational prospects.

== Destinations ==
LATAM Ecuador serves the following destinations:

Country	City	Airport	Notes	Refs
Argentina	Buenos Aires	Ministro Pistarini International Airport		
Chile	Santiago	Arturo Merino Benítez International Airport		
Colombia	Bogotá	El Dorado International Airport		
Ecuador	Baltra Island	Seymour Airport		
Ecuador	Cuenca	Mariscal Lamar Airport		
Ecuador	El Coca	Francisco de Orellana Airport		
Ecuador	Guayaquil	Jose Joaquin de Olmedo International Airport	Hub	
Ecuador	Loja	Ciudad de Catamayo Airport	Terminated	
Ecuador	Manta	Eloy Alfaro International Airport		
Ecuador	Quito	Mariscal Sucre International Airport	Hub	
Ecuador	San Cristóbal Island	San Cristóbal Airport		
Ecuador	Santa Rosa	Santa Rosa International Airport		
Peru	Lima	Jorge Chávez International Airport	Operated by LATAM Perú	
Spain	Madrid	Madrid–Barajas Airport	Terminated	
United States	Miami	Miami International Airport		
United States	New York City	John F. Kennedy International Airport	Suspended	

=== Codeshare agreements ===
LATAM Ecuador codeshares with the following airlines:

- Air Nostrum
- Delta Air Lines
- Iberia

== Fleet ==
=== Current fleet ===
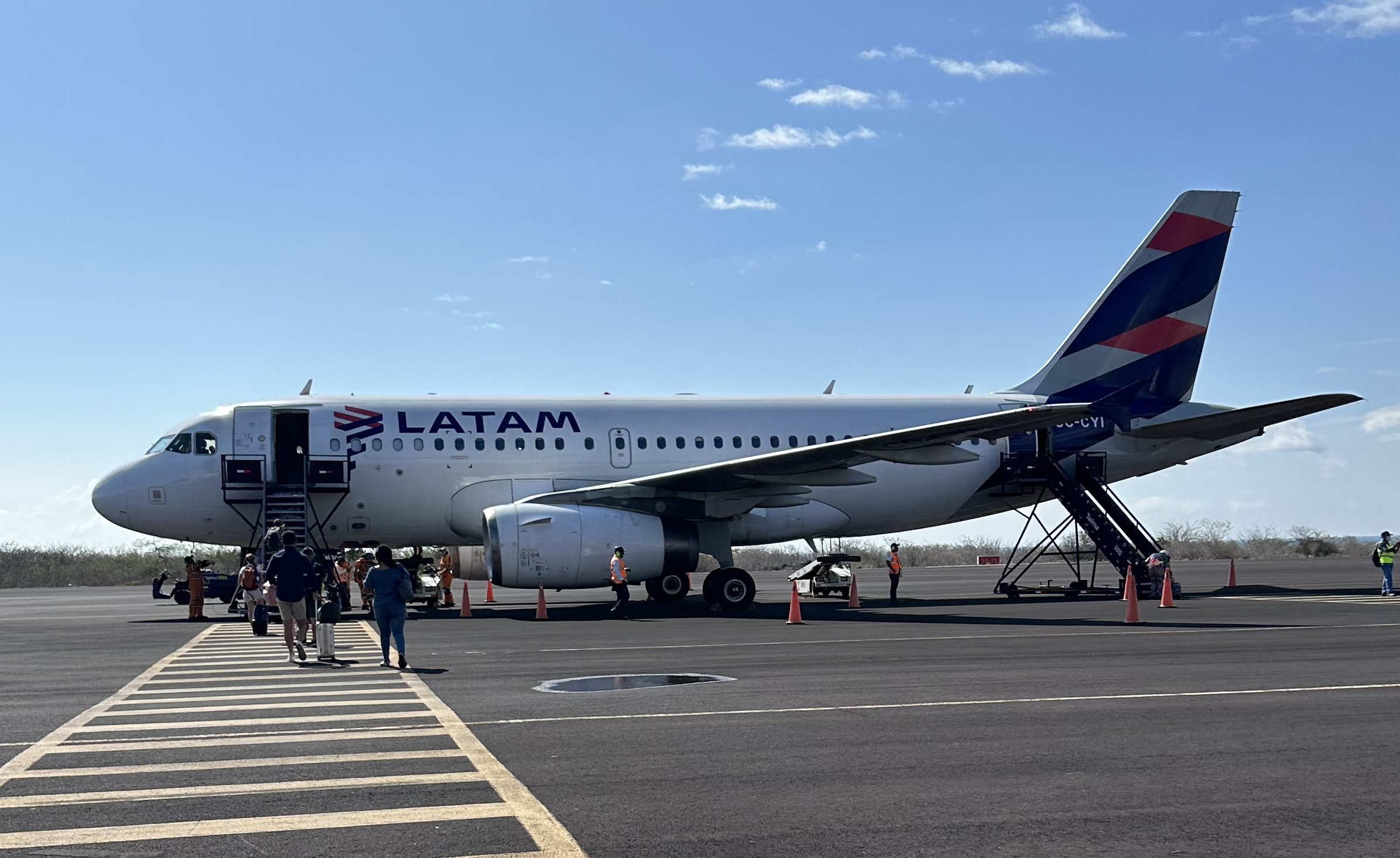
LATAM Ecuador Airbus A319-100

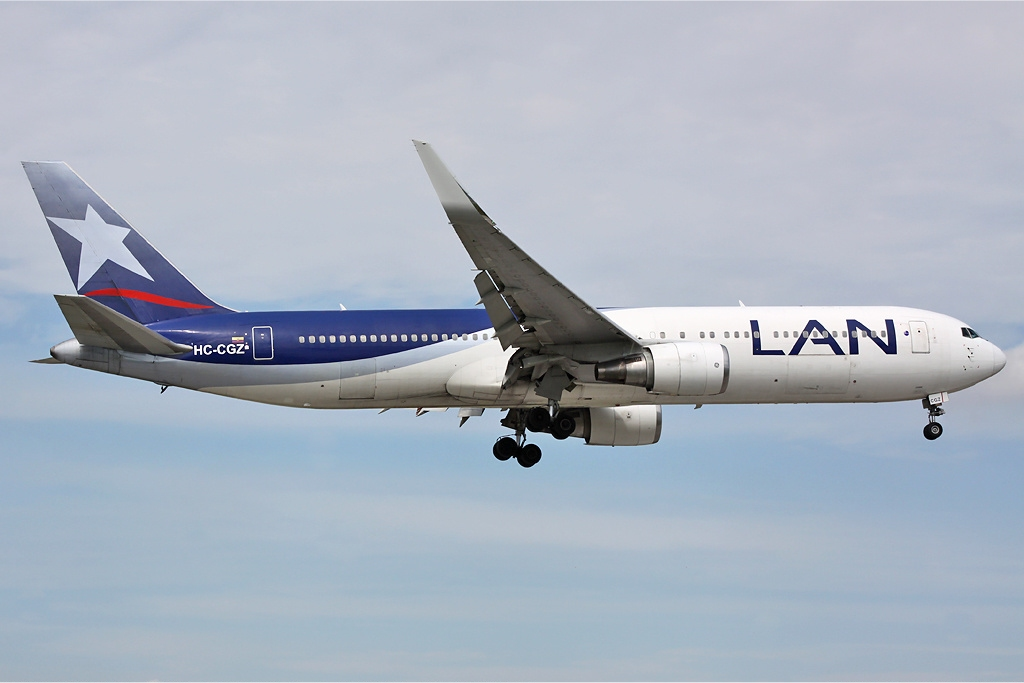
A former LAN Ecuador Boeing 767-300ER, 2010

As of July 2026, LATAM Airlines Ecuador operates the following aircraft:

LATAM Ecuador fleet
Aircraft	In service	Orders	Passengers			Notes
Aircraft	In service	Orders	J	Y	Total	Notes
Airbus A319	9	—	–	144	144	
Airbus A320neo	2	—	–			
Total	11	—				

=== Former fleet ===
As of August 2025, LATAM Airlines Ecuador operated 9 Airbus A319.

The airline previously operated the following aircraft:

LATAM Ecuador former fleet
Aircraft	Total	Introduced	Retired	Notes
Airbus A318-100	3	2009	2011	Transferred to LAN Airlines
Airbus A320-200	6	2011	2014	Transferred to LAN Airlines
Boeing 767-300ER	6	2008	2012	Transferred to LAN Airlines

== See also ==
- List of airlines of Ecuador
