= SETN =

SETN may refer to:

- SET News, news channel of the Sanlih E-Television in Taiwan
- Special Events Television Network, defunct syndicated television package
- Colonel Carlos Concha Torres Airport, ICAO code SETN
