= Aeroregional =

Ecuadorian airline

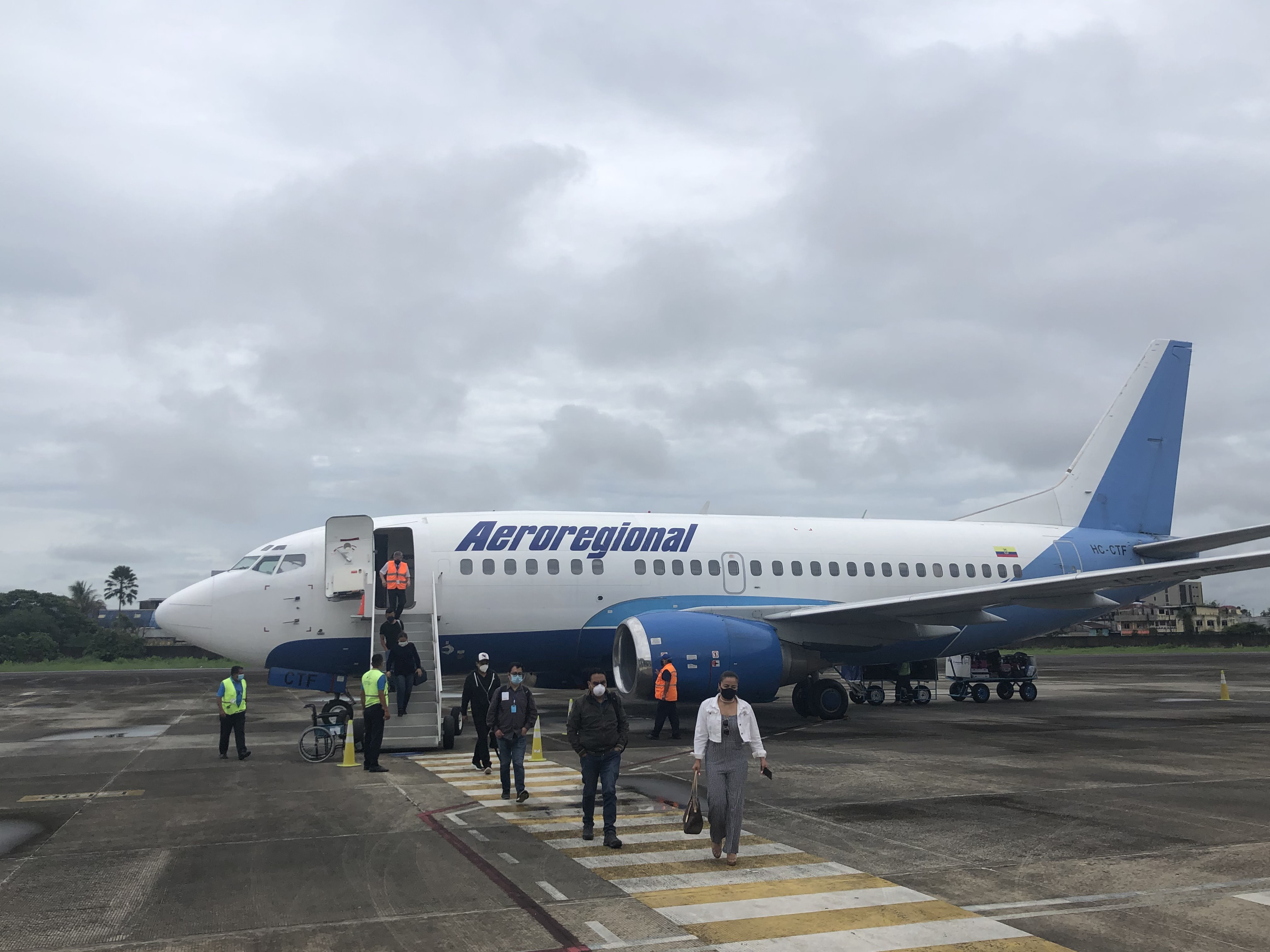
IATA	ICAO	Call sign
6G	RER	REGAIR
- Founded: January 2018
- Commenced operations: 5 August 2019
- Hubs: Mariscal Sucre International Airport
- Subsidiaries: (Peru) Aeroregional Perú
- Fleet size: 7
- Destinations: 9
- Headquarters: Quito, Ecuador
- Website: aeroregional.net

Servicio Aereo Regional Cia Ltda., marketed as Aeroregional, is a regional airline from Ecuador with its hub in Mariscal Sucre International Airport in Quito.

== Destinations ==
As of 2026, Aeroregional operates 6 domestic and 4 international flights from Quito.

Country	City	Airport	Notes
Colombia	Cali	Alfonso Bonilla Aragón International Airport	
Dominican Republic	Punta Cana	Punta Cana International Airport	
Ecuador	Baltra Island	Seymour Airport	Terminated
Ecuador	Cuenca	Mariscal Lamar International Airport	Terminated
Ecuador	El Coca	Francisco de Orellana Airport	
Ecuador	Esmeraldas	Colonel Carlos Concha Torres Airport	
Ecuador	Guayaquil	José Joaquín de Olmedo International Airport	Terminated
Ecuador	Latacunga	Cotopaxi International Airport	Terminated
Ecuador	Loja	Ciudad de Catamayo Airport	
Ecuador	Manta	Eloy Alfaro International Airport	Terminated
Ecuador	Santa Rosa	Santa Rosa International Airport	
Ecuador	Quito	Mariscal Sucre International Airport	Hub
Ecuador	San Cristóbal Island	San Cristóbal Airport	Terminated
Panama	Panama City	Panamá Pacífico International Airport	
Peru	Lima	Jorge Chávez International Airport	
Venezuela	Caracas	Simón Bolívar International Airport	Terminated
Venezuela	Maracaibo	La Chinita International Airport	Charter
Venezuela	Porlamar	Santiago Mariño Caribbean International Airport	Terminated

== Fleet ==
=== Current fleet ===
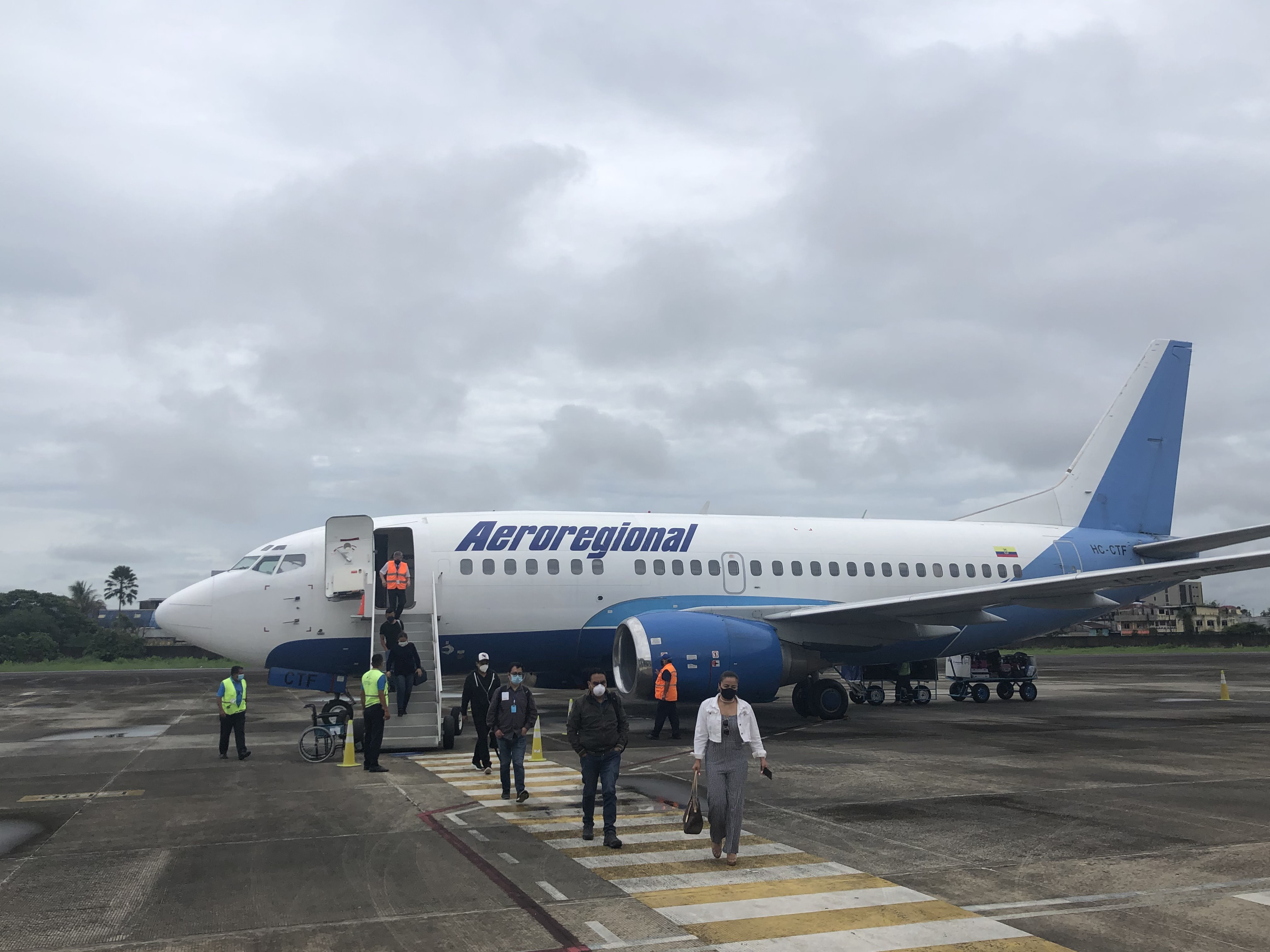
An Aeroregional Boeing 737-500

As of July 2026, Aeroregional operates the following aircraft:

Aeroregional fleet
Aircraft	In service	Orders	Passengers	Notes
Airbus A321	1	—		
Boeing 737-400	3	—	145	
Boeing 737-500	3	—	129	
Total	7	—		

=== Former fleet ===
As of August 2025, Aeroregional operated 2 Boeing 737-400 and 3 Boeing 737-500.

== See also ==
- List of airlines of Ecuador
