= TAME =

Flag-carrier airline of Ecuador (1962–2020)

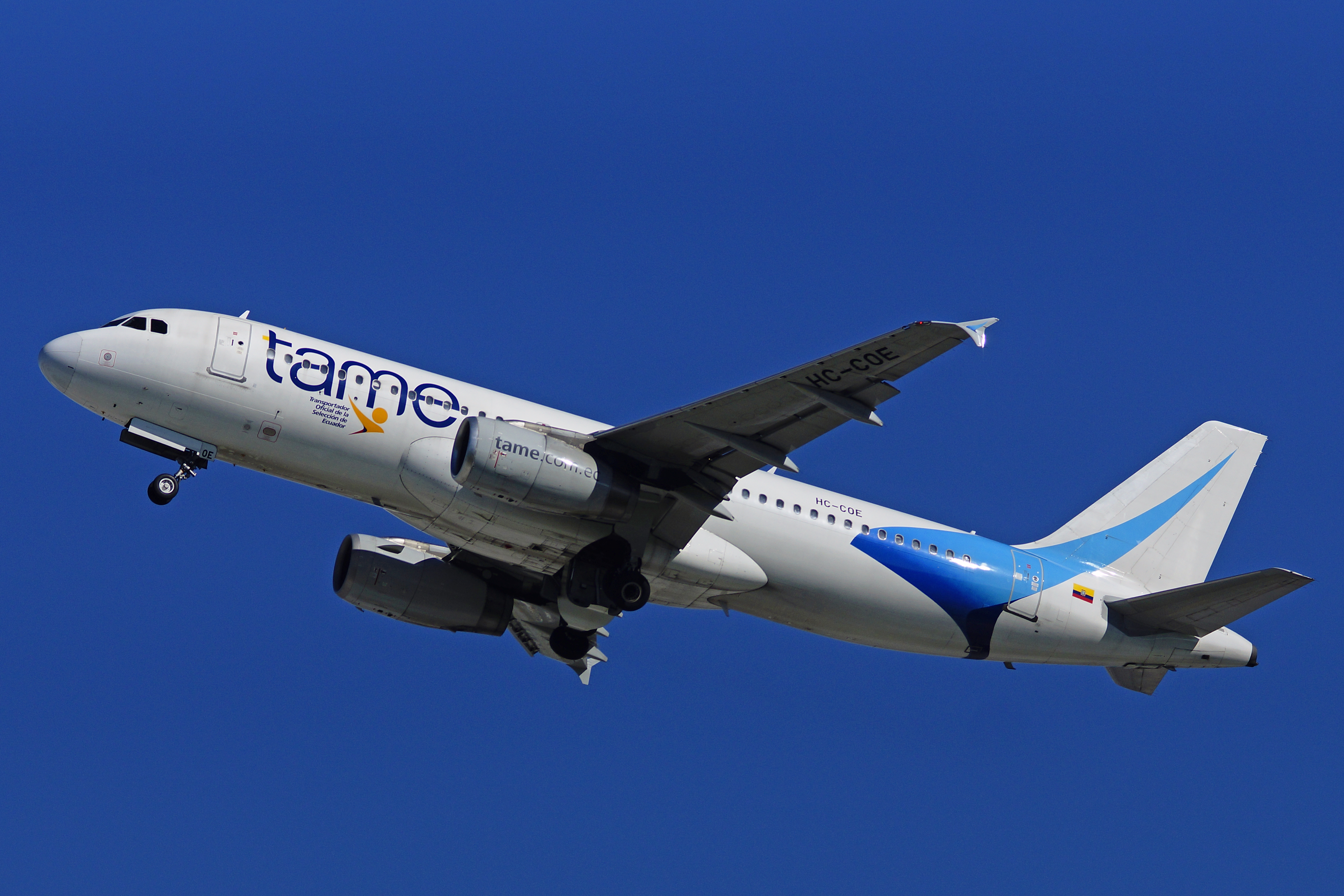
- Airbus A320
IATA	ICAO	Call sign
EQ	TAE	TAME
- Founded: 17 December 1962; 63 years ago
- Ceased operations: 19 May 2020; 6 years ago
- Hubs: Mariscal Sucre International Airport
- Focus cities: José Joaquín de Olmedo International Airport
- Frequent-flyer program: TAME Millas
- Subsidiaries: TAME Amazonia; TAME Xpress
- Fleet size: 5
- Destinations: 16
- Parent company: Ecuadorian Government
- Headquarters: Quito, Ecuador
- Key people: Fernando Guerrero (CEO)
- Website: www.tame.com.ec

TAME or TAME EP Linea Aerea del Ecuador was an airline founded in Ecuador in 1962. TAME (pronounced "tah-meh") was the flag carrier and the largest airline of Ecuador. TAME headquarters were in Quito, Pichincha Province and the main hub was Mariscal Sucre International Airport in Quito. The airline was formed by the Air Force of Ecuador. In 2011, it became a commercial entity and provided domestic, international and charter flights. On May 20, 2020, the Ecuadorean government decided to cease all operations and liquidate the airline.

== History ==
=== Early years ===
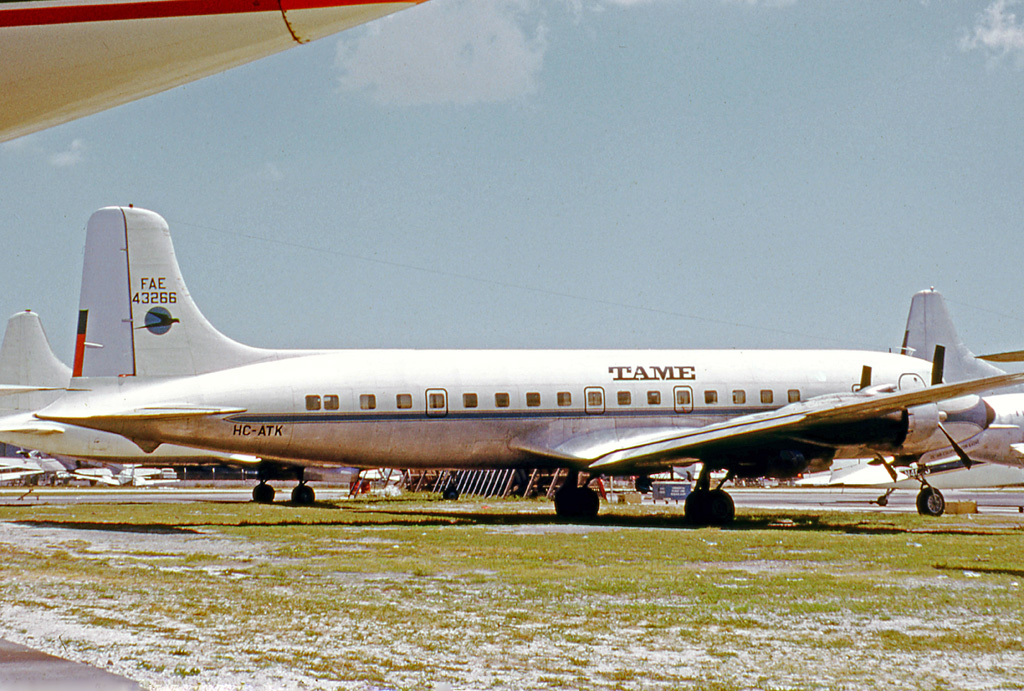
A Douglas DC-6B at Miami in 1972

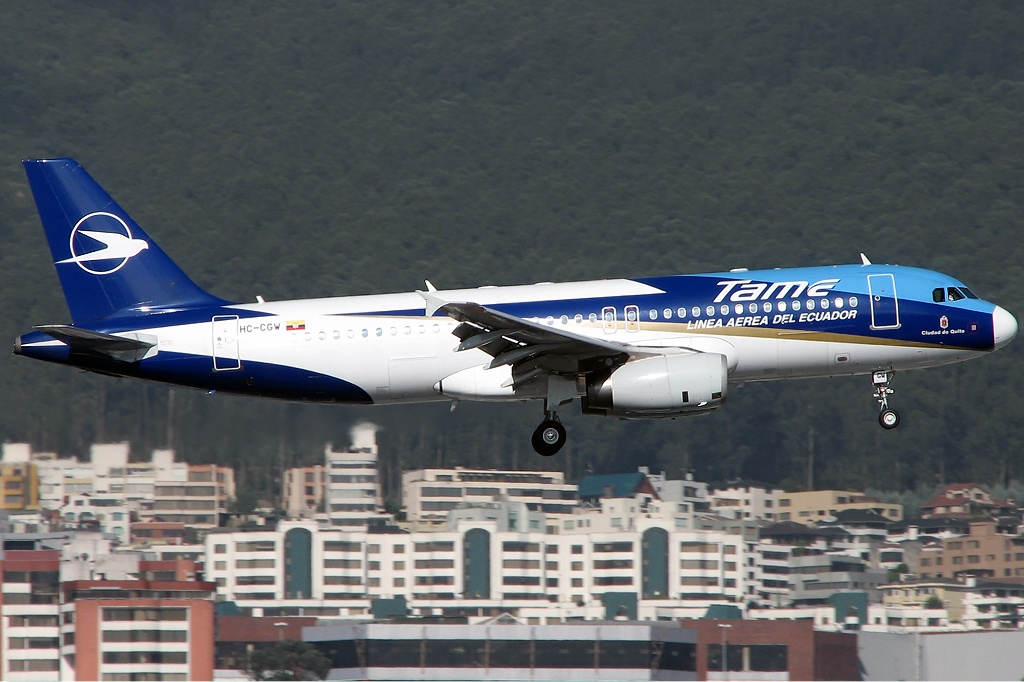
An Airbus A320 with old livery at Quito in 2010

The military airline was founded on December 17, 1962, by Luis A. Ortega under Guillermo Freile Posso, both colonels. It was named Transportes Aéreos Militares Ecuatorianos (TAME). At the time, the Air Force required an income source; governmental transport services to remote and difficult to reach parts of Ecuador; and an entity to train pilots. The airline gradually increased in size infrastructure and number of services.

On December 4, 1962, Luis A. Ortega, Hector Granja, Eduardo Sandoval, Alfredo Barreiro, Oswaldo Lara, Julio Espinosa, Teodoro Malo and Jose Montesinos made inaugural flights in the Douglas C-47. The pilots held the rank of major and noncommissioned officers worked as flight attendants. The first commercial flight was made by Teodoro Malo on a route from Quito, Esmeraldas, Bahía, Manta, Guayaquil, Cuenca and back to Quito. Initially, TAME made domestic flights using C-47 planes. Gradually, over the next two years, DC-3 and DC-6 planes were added and then in 1970, two HS-748 Avro were acquired.

On April 30, 1966, TAME began regular international flights to Havana, Panama and Santiago de Chile.

As its business grew, TAME purchased four Lockheed L-188 Electras from Ecuatoriana de Aviación. In the late 1970s and early 1980s, TAME added three Boeing 727-100s. During the mid-1980s and up until 1992, Tame purchased four Boeing 727-200s. In 1986, three Fokker F28 Fellowship 4000s were added. In December 1998, TAME rented a Boeing 757-200.

In December 1992, the governments of Ecuador and Colombia signed the "Frontier Integration Agreement" establishing a Quito, Esmeraldas (Tachina), Cali, Esmeraldas (Tachina), Quito route. In 1995, TAME offered flights from Quito to Bogotá for Air France passengers.

=== Development during the 2000s ===
In 2000, TAME began a long process of fleet renewal beginning with the renting of two Airbus A320s. These planes were delivered at the European Corporation Assemble factory, Toulouse and were renewed in 2008. Also in 2000, the Boeing 727s were retired. TAME found the Embraer 170/190s suited the airline's needs. Over the next two years, two models of the 170 series and one of the 190 series were obtained. On August 25, 2008, one Airbus A319 was obtained and soon after the two Airbus A320s were replaced, completing the fleet renewal.

In 2011, Tame changed its legal status to a state-owned company, no longer under the administration of the Ecuadorian Air Force.

In 2013, TAME incorporated its first and only Airbus A330-200, formerly of Dubai’s Emirates, to cover flights to New York City. In addition, 3 Quest Kodiaks were incorporated for its subsidiary TAME Amazonía for the routes in the country's Amazon.

On May 19, 2020, the Ecuadorean government decided to liquidate the airline and ceased all operations. The airline, which had been struggling for several years, claimed that its difficulties were compounded by the impact of the COVID-19 pandemic.

== Logo ==
Logo from 1962 to 2009

TAME's colours were blue, light blue, and gold as a decorative element. The original logo, designed by Luis A. Ortega symbolized the flight of a bird with a sun in the background. In 2009, the airline was rebranded with a new logo and colour palette.

== Destinations ==
TAME's hub was in Quito at Mariscal Sucre International Airport. TAME flew internationally to Cali in Colombia as well as Fort Lauderdale and New York in the United States. The main destinations in Ecuador were Guayaquil, Cuenca, Manta and Esmeraldas.

=== Codeshare agreements ===
In 1997, TAME extended its international schedule through an agreement with EVA Air of Taiwan. On December 1, 2010, a codeshare agreement was made with Copa Airlines.

== Fleet ==
=== Final fleet ===
As of March 2020, the TAME fleet comprised the following aircraft:

TAME fleet
Aircraft	In service	Orders	Passengers			Notes
Aircraft	In service	Orders	J	Y	Total	Notes
Airbus A319-100	1	—	10	135	145	
Airbus A320-200	1	—	12	150	162	
ATR 42-500	3	—	–	50	50	
Total	5	—				

=== Historical fleet ===
Since its foundation, the airline's fleet has grown with the following aircraft:

TAME historical fleet
Aircraft	Total	Introduced	Retired	Notes
Airbus A330-200	1	2013	2019	Former Emirates aircraft
Beechcraft 200	1	1980	1980	
Boeing 727-100	3	1984	2006	One crashed as Flight 120
Boeing 727-200	6	1990	2009	One crashed as Flight 422
Boeing 737-200	1	1981	1983	Written off
Boeing 757-200	1	1999	1999	Leased from TAESA
de Havilland Canada DHC-5 Buffalo	2	1976	1990	
de Havilland Canada DHC-6 Twin Otter	6	1975	2011	
Douglas C-47 Skytrain	11	1968	1982	
Douglas DC-3	1	1969	Unknown	
Douglas DC-6B	4	1963	1974	
Embraer EMB 120 Brasilia	2	2007	2016	Leased from SAEREO; Operated by TAME Xpress
Embraer 170LR	2	2006	2015	
Embraer 190AR	5	2006	2019	
Fokker F-28 Mk 4000	3	1985	2009	
Hawker Siddeley HS 748	5	1970	2009	
Lockheed L-188 Electra	6	1974	1989	Two used for spare parts
Quest Kodiak 100	3	2013	2020	Leased from Air Amazonia; Operated by TAME Amazonía

== Accidents and incidents ==
- On September 6, 1969 twelve men and one woman, armed with machine guns, hijacked two TAME Douglas C-47s at Mariscal Sucre Airport. The hijackers shot and killed one crewman and wounded another. The hijackers told the passengers that the hijacking was in retaliation for the deaths of several students during anti-government rioting at the University of Guayaquil in May 1969. Both aircraft flew to Tumaco, Colombia for refueling. One aircraft was left behind as the hijackers continued on to Panama's Tocumen International Airport. After a thirty-minute refueling stop, the aircraft continued to Kingston, Jamaica. After a 71-minute refueling stop, the plane left Kingston at 9 p.m., finally landing in Cuba.
- On January 20, 1976, A TAME Hawker Siddeley HS 748 (registered HC-AUE) crashed while flying over mountainous terrain. The plane was flying at 10,000 feet then struck trees with its right wing, lost control and crashed into the side of a mountain. The plane was en route from Loja to Guayaquil's José Joaquín de Olmedo International Airport. Six crew members and 28 passengers died. There were eight survivors.
- On May 22, 1981, A TAME de Havilland Canada DHC-6 Twin Otter (registered HC-BAX) crashed into a fog-shrouded mountain near Zumba. It was flying in formation with a Beech 200 (HC-BHG), which also crashed into the mountain. Fifteen passengers and three crew members on board died.
- On July 11, 1983, TAME Flight 173, a Boeing 737-200 crashed while on final approach to Mariscal Lamar International Airport in Cuenca. The crash was caused by the crew's lack of training in the aircraft type. All 119 people on board were killed. This was the most lethal event in the history of Ecuadorian aviation.
- On November 20, 1984, A TAME de Havilland Canada DHC-6 Twin Otter crashed into a hill while flying between Loja and Zumba. Twelve passengers and two crew members died.
- On September 12, 1988, A TAME Lockheed L-188 Electra with registration HC-AZY took off from Lago Agrio airport on a ferry flight to Quito with the "number 2" engine inoperative. Immediately after takeoff, the "number 1" engine exploded causing the aircraft to veer left and crash. Six crew members and one passenger died.
- On April 20, 1998, Air France Flight 422, a Boeing 727-200 (registered HC-BSU), crashed into the "El Cable" cerro minutes after taking off from Bogota's El Dorado International Airport en route to Quito. In bad weather, the crew failed to execute proper departure procedures. Instead of turning, they flew in a straight line into the hill. Fifty-three passengers and crew members died.
- On January 28, 2002, TAME Flight 120, a Boeing 727-100 (registered HC-BLF), departed from Quito en route to Tulcán. Several minutes outside Tulcán, the control tower lost contact with the aircraft. The aeroplane collided with the Cumbal Volcano causing the death of all 94 passengers and crew. The crash occurred because the captain flew too fast into the final turn.
- On September 16, 2011, TAME Flight 148, an Embraer 190AR (registered HC-CEZ) departed from Loja Airport. On takeoff, the plane slid off the runway. All 97 passengers and 6 crew survived.
- On April 28, 2016, TAME Flight 173 from Quito landed at Cuenca airport in bad weather. The Embraer 190AR (registered HC-COX), slid off the runway. All 87 passengers and 6 crew survived.

== See also ==
- Ecuatoriana de Aviación
- List of defunct airlines of Ecuador
