= Air France Flight 422 =

1998 aviation accident

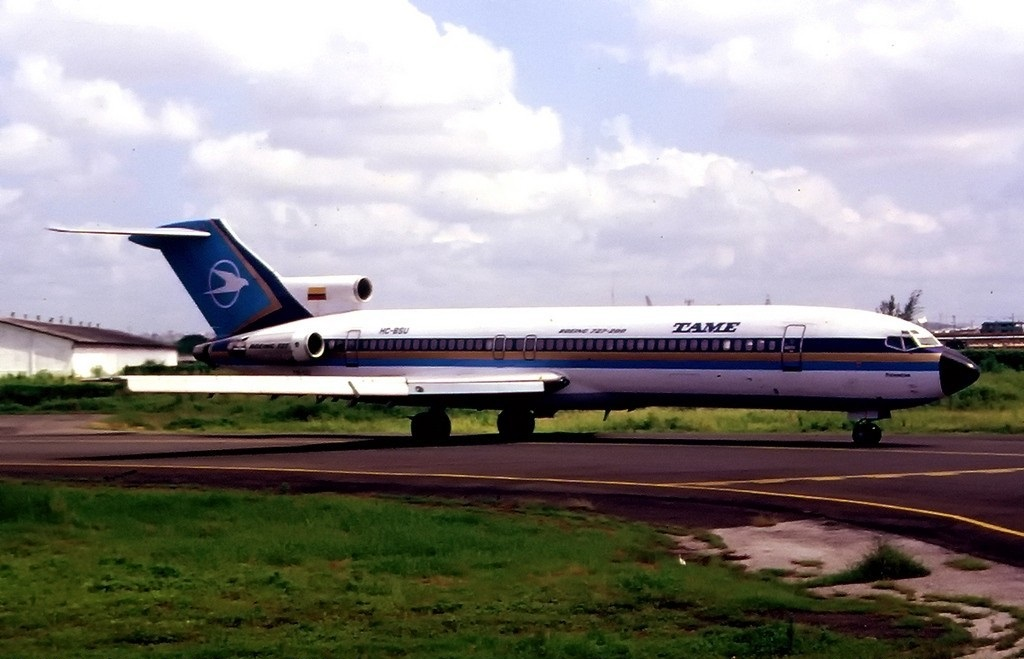
- HC-BSU, the aircraft involved in the accident, photographed in February 1998, 2 months before the crash

Accident
- Date: 20 April 1998
- Summary: Controlled flight into terrain (CFIT) due to pilot error aggravated by inclement weather
- Site: near El Dorado International Airport, Bogotá, Colombia; 4°38′00″N 74°03′00″W

Aircraft
- Aircraft type: Boeing 727-230Adv
- Operator: TAME on behalf of Air France
- IATA flight No.: AF422
- ICAO flight No.: AFR422
- Call sign: AIRFRANS 422
- Registration: HC-BSU
- Flight origin: Charles De-Gaulle Airport, Paris, France
- Stopover: El Dorado International Airport, Bogotá, Colombia
- Destination: Mariscal Sucre International Airport, Quito, Ecuador
- Occupants: 53
- Passengers: 43
- Crew: 10
- Fatalities: 53
- Survivors: 0

Air France Flight 422 was a scheduled flight on 20 April 1998 by Air France from Bogotá, Colombia, to Quito, Ecuador, covering the final leg of a flight from Paris to Quito. The Boeing 727 was destroyed, killing all 53 people on board, when it crashed into the Eastern Hills of Bogotá because of foggy weather and low visibility after taking off from Bogotá's El Dorado International Airport. The plane was owned by TAME, the Ecuadorian airline, but was being operated on a wet-lease basis to Air France as the final leg of its flight from Paris.

== Summary ==
The TAME Boeing 727-200Adv was covering the final leg of an Air France flight, with an Ecuadorian crew. The 3-man flight deck crew was acceptably skilled, according to training authorities, but the flight's captain had logged only about 400 hours in the 727. A flight operations mechanic and 6 flight attendants completed the crew. Forty-three passengers were among the 53 people on board the aircraft.

The captain was 42-year-old Jaime Vasconez Zuñiga, a former Ecuadorian Air Force pilot who had been working for TAME for three years. He had accumulated 5,062 flight hours, including 2,296 hours on the Boeing 727, but only 413 hours as a 727 captain. The first officer was 44-year-old Carlos Cadena Silva, also a retired Air Force officer and had been flying with TAME for a year. He had 7,872 flight hours but only 528 in this type of aircraft. They were accompanied by Flight Engineer Luis Delgado Cherrez, 54, who had 7,878 flight hours in his career as an aviator. And finally, they were also accompanied by flight operations technician Edison Torres, 32 years old.

The weather conditions were 7-kilometre (4.3 mi; 3.8 nmi) visibility, limited by a broken ceiling layer of cumulonimbus clouds 2,000 feet (610 m) above the aerodrome; a temperature of 16 °C (61 °F); and an altimeter pressure decrease from (3,031 to 3,024 inHg (10,260 to 10,240 kPa)).

== Accident ==
The aircraft was cleared to Quito International Airport via the Girardot 1 (GIR1) departure, which consisted of a right turn after takeoff (over the Romeo/R NDB) for noise abatement, and subsequent transitioning (via VIOTA) to a south-west route. The flight crew failed to execute the maneuver properly; the first officer, acting as pilot flying, did not make the initial turn, and then forgot to turn the transponder on, which prevented air traffic controllers from assisting them. The FDR showed a departure profile with a low vertical speed, and an airspeed of 260 knots (480 km/h; 300 mph), designed to decrease fuel utilization. The procedure was also planned to prevent transit ahead of the 19 DME arc of the Bogotá VOR, a mountainous zone whose minimum altitude increases drastically to 14,000 feet (4,267 m). Investigators concluded that the acceleration toward 260 knots resulted in loss of situational awareness by the crew, with the single-minded focus on gaining airspeed leading to disregard of safe navigation of the aircraft.

Less than 2 minutes after taking off from the runway 13L, the aircraft crashed into the Cerro el Cable at an airspeed of 260 knots, while passing 10,100 feet (3,078 m). All 53 people on board died due to a combination of impact and fire injuries. The fire also consumed a 10,000-square-foot (930 m^{2}) forest area, which was burnt after the aircraft disintegrated and exploded upon impact.
