= Mariscal Lamar International Airport =

International airport in Cuenca, Azuay Province, Ecuador

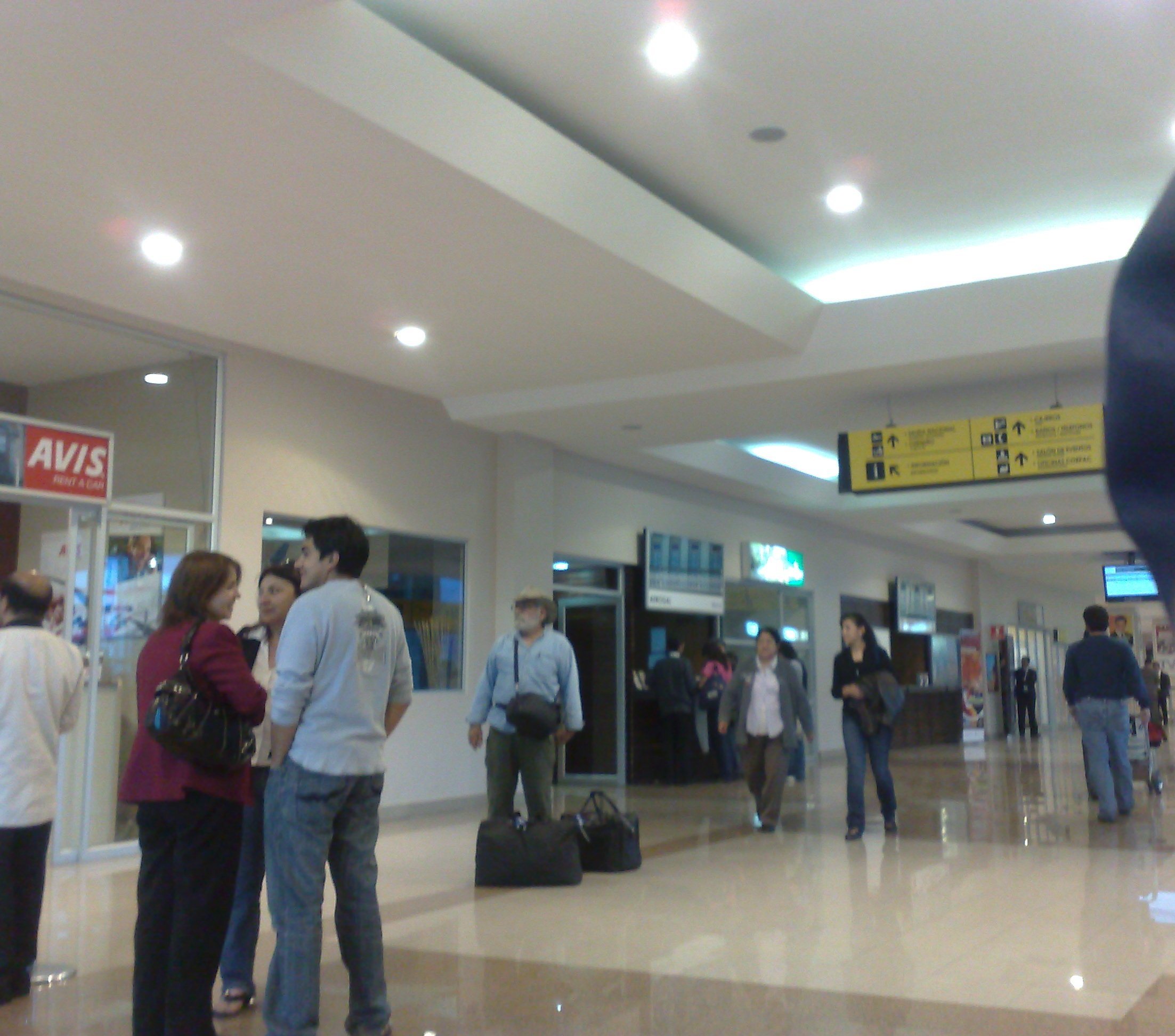
- Interior of Mariscal Lamar Airport
- IATA: CUE; ICAO: SECU

Summary
- Airport type: Public
- Operator: Corporación Aeroportuaria de Cuenca
- Serves: Cuenca, Ecuador
- Elevation AMSL: 8,306 ft (2,532 m)
- Coordinates: 02°53′22″S 78°59′05″W
- Website: www.aeropuertocuenca.ec

Map
- Location of airport in Ecuador

Runways
Direction	Length		Surface
Direction	m	ft	Surface
05/23	1,900	6,234	Asphalt
- Source: WAD GCM

Mariscal Lamar International Airport (Spanish: Aeropuerto Internacional Mariscal Lamar) (IATA: CUE, ICAO: SECU) is a high elevation airport serving Cuenca, the capital of the Azuay Province in Ecuador. It is named after the Peruvian military leader and politician José de la Mar, a native of Cuenca.

== Facilities ==
Since 2002 the Instrument landing system (ILS) for the airport has been fully operational. The airport is in a high elevation basin within the Ecuadorian Andes, with mountainous terrain in all quadrants.

Despite improvements, the location of the airport in the middle of the city is a major handicap, as the runway is only barely long enough for large planes landing at this altitude. This has resulted in accidents involving planes running off the end of the runway, and a restriction on flights in wet weather during much of 2016. The airport has completed a runway resurfacing to improve traction in wet weather.

== Airlines and destinations ==
Airlines	Destinations
Aeroregional	Quito
Avianca Ecuador	Guayaquil, Quito
LATAM Ecuador	Baltra, Guayaquil, Quito

== Incidents ==
- On 20 October 1971, a Vickers Viscount of SAETA was hijacked by six people. It landed at Cuenca Airport.
- On 8 October 1982, Vickers Viscount HC-ATV of SAN Ecuador was damaged beyond economic repair.
- On 11 July 1983, a Boeing 737 operating a TAME flight from Quito to Cuenca, crashed killing all 117 on board on final approach to the airport.
- On 28 April 2016, an Embraer E190, operating a TAME flight from Quito to Cuenca, slid off the end of the runway. No injuries or deaths were reported, but flight operations were limited afterwards as the Dirección General de Aviación Civil de Ecuador prohibited aircraft from landing if the runway was wet. This led to runway resurfacing work, completed in late 2016.

== See also ==
- Transport in Ecuador
- List of airports in Ecuador
