= Eloy Alfaro International Airport =

- IATA: MEC; ICAO: SEMT

Summary
- Airport type: Public / Military
- Operator: Military of Ecuador
- Location: Manta, Ecuador
- Elevation AMSL: 48 ft (15 m)
- Coordinates: 00°56′45″S 80°40′43″W

Map
- Location of airport in Ecuador

Runways
| Direction | Length | | Surface |
| Direction | m | ft | Surface |
|---|---|---|---|
| 05/23 | 2,860 | 9,383 | Asphalt |
- Source: WAD GCM

Eloy Alfaro International Airport (IATA: MEC, ICAO: SEMT) is a joint use civil and military airport on the Pacific coast near Manta, a city in the Manabí Province of Ecuador. The airport, also known as Eloy Alfaro Air Base, is named in honor of Eloy Alfaro, a former president of Ecuador. It was inaugurated by the Ecuadorian Air Force on October 24, 1978. It is the fourth-busiest airport in Ecuador.

== Airlines and destinations ==
| Airlines | Destinations |
|---|---|
| Avianca Ecuador | Quito |
| Copa Airlines | Panama City–Tocumen |
| LATAM Ecuador | Quito |

== Former U.S. military presence ==
A portion of the airport was used until July 2009 by the Air Forces Southern Air Force component of the United States Southern Command, for operations against illegal cocaine trafficking in northwestern South America. It was formally known as Forward Operating Location Manta. In 1999, the U.S. signed a ten-year agreement with then Ecuadorean President Jamil Mahuad allowing the U.S. to station up 475 military personnel at Manta, rent-free. USAF AWACS E-3 and United States Navy P-3 Orion aircraft, supported by about 300 US military personnel, operated from the base to monitor air traffic in the area. The U.S. aircraft based at Manta fed surveillance information to the Joint Interagency Task Force South in Key West. The aircraft at the base flew about 100 missions per month looking for drug-running boats departing Colombia. In 2007, the flights led to about 200 cocaine seizures, totaling about 230 tons. The flights accounted for about 60 percent of U.S. drug interdiction in the eastern Pacific. The United States used its presence at Manta Air Base to spy on Ecuador.

From before his election, President Rafael Correa stated that he would not renew the agreement that allowed the United States access to the base when it expires in November 2009, and commented that "We can negotiate with the U.S. about a base in Manta, if they let us put a military base in Miami..." . On March 19, 2008, the Ecuadorian Constituent Assembly voted to outlaw the installation of any foreign military bases and installations in Ecuador. On July 26, 2008, Ecuador's Foreign Ministry formally notified the U.S. embassy that the U.S. lease on the base would not be renewed.

Admiral James Stavridis, chief of the U.S. Southern Command stated on April 21, 2008, that there were no plans to find a replacement drug-interdiction air base in South America if Ecuador declined to renew the lease of Manta. Instead, the U.S. military would use existing air bases in El Salvador, Curaçao, and Key West, Florida for drug-surveillance flights. Other bases in the continental mass have been posited as candidates for a replacement.

On April 14, 2009, U.S. ambassador to Colombia William Brownfield announced that the base would be relocating from Manta to a location somewhere in Colombia. Said Brownfield, "Colombia and the U.S. are collaborating on efforts against illegal drugs. Part of this collaboration, without doubt, requires access to facilities between both countries." As of July 2009, the U.S. was negotiating with Colombia to use Palanquero Air Base in Puerto Salgar as Manta's replacement.

The last U.S. military anti-narcotics surveillance mission from Manta was flown on July 17, 2009.

== See also ==
- Ecuador-United States relations
- Guadalupe Larriva
- Transport in Ecuador
- List of airports in Ecuador
