= Santa Rosa International Airport =

Santa Rosa International Airport Coronel Artilleria Victor Larrea Airport
- IATA: ETR; ICAO: SERO

Summary
- Airport type: Public
- Serves: Machala
- Location: Santa Rosa
- Elevation AMSL: 170 ft (52 m)
- Coordinates: 3°26′7″S 79°58′40″W

Map
- Location of airport in Ecuador

Runways
Direction	Length		Surface
Direction	m	ft	Surface
07/25	2,470	8,200	Asphalt
- Sources: WAD Google Maps

Santa Rosa International Airport (IATA: ETR, ICAO: SERO) (also known as Coronel Artilleria Victor Larrea Airport) is an airport serving Machala, the capital of El Oro Province in Ecuador. Located 20 kilometres (12 mi) south in Santa Rosa, it replaces the closed General Manuel Serrano Airport in Machala, and is designed to handle international flights from Peru. It was built by the Ecuadorean Army Corps of Engineers under the direction of Ecuador's Directorate General of Civil Aviation. This great scale engineering project was led by Maj. Eng. Henry Miranda and Maj. Eng. J.C. Checa.

As of October 2025, the airport just services the flights from Aeroregional to/from Quito. There is also a VIP lounge available sometimes after security.

== Airlines and destinations ==
Airlines	Destinations
Aeroregional	Quito

== See also ==
- Transport in Ecuador
- List of airports in Ecuador
