= Seymour Airport =

Airport in the Galapagos Islands, Ecuador

Seymour Galapagos Ecological Airport
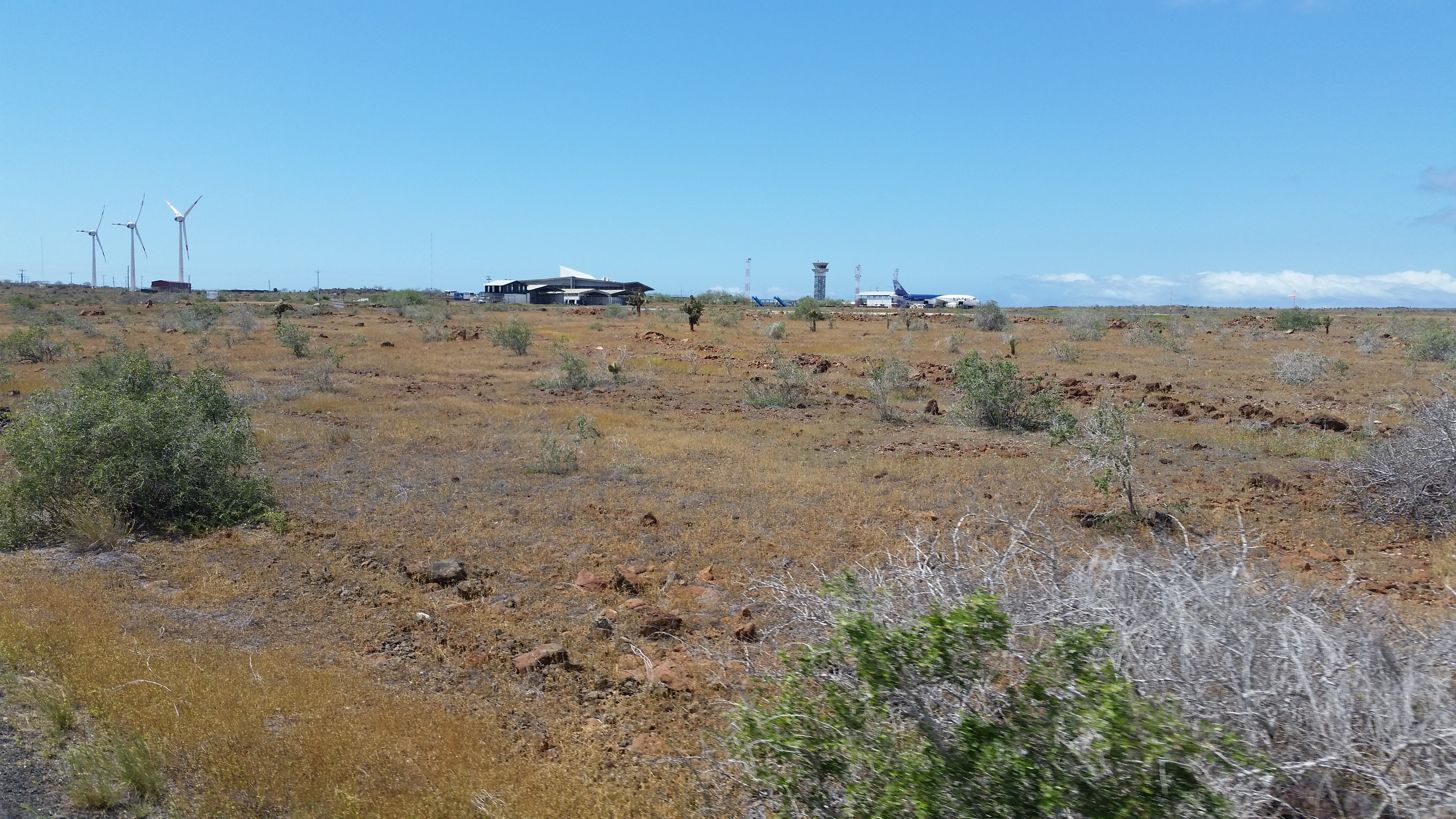
- IATA: GPS; ICAO: SEGS

Summary
- Airport type: Public / Military
- Serves: Baltra, Galápagos Islands, Ecuador
- Elevation AMSL: 207 ft (63 m)
- Coordinates: 00°27′14″S 90°15′57″W
- Website: ecogal.aero/en/

Map
- Location of airport in the Galápagos Islands

Runways
Direction	Length		Surface
Direction	m	ft	Surface
14/32	2,401	7,877	Asphalt
- Source: WAD GCM

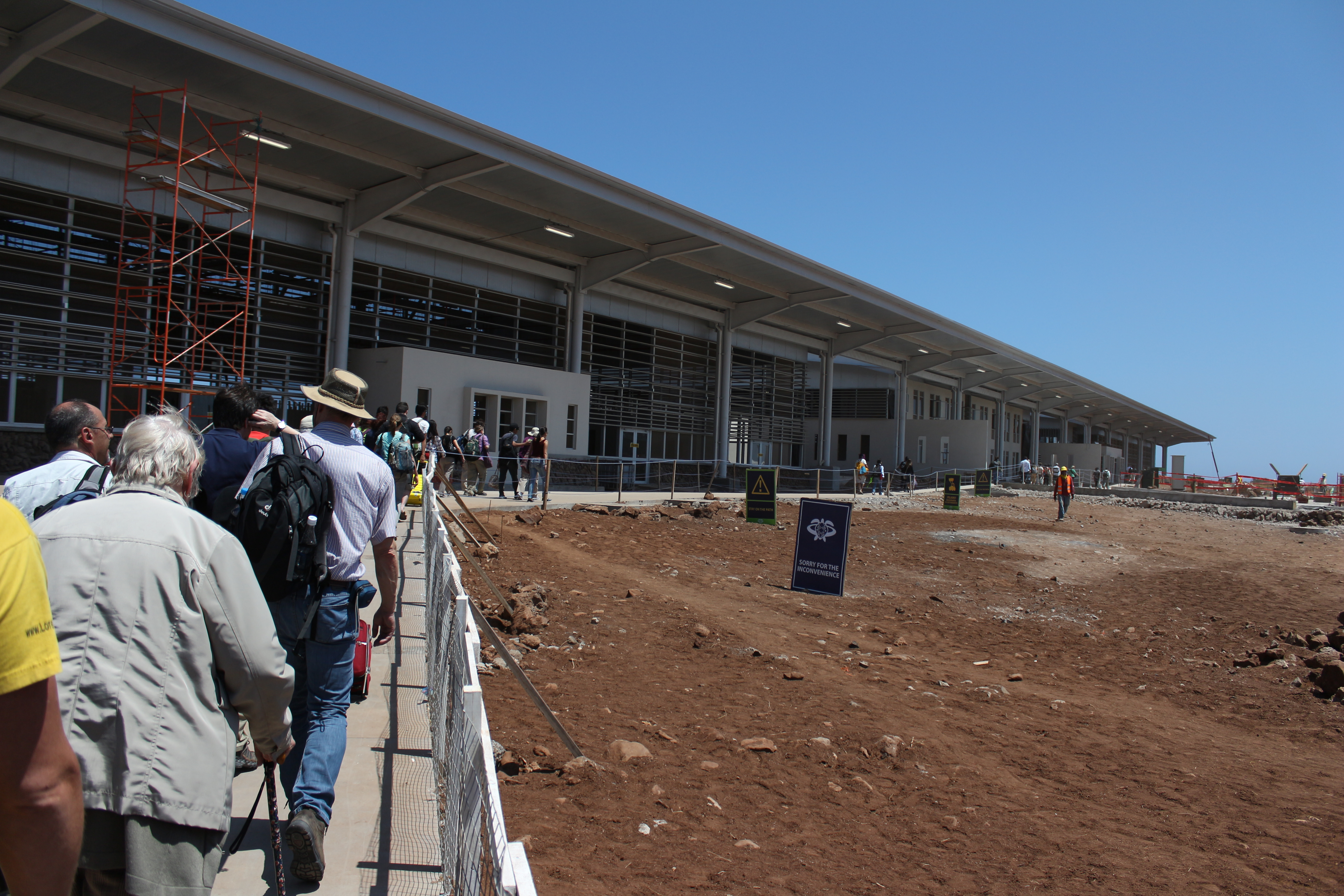
Outside of new building of Seymour Airport, Baltra Is., Galapagos Islands, Ecuador

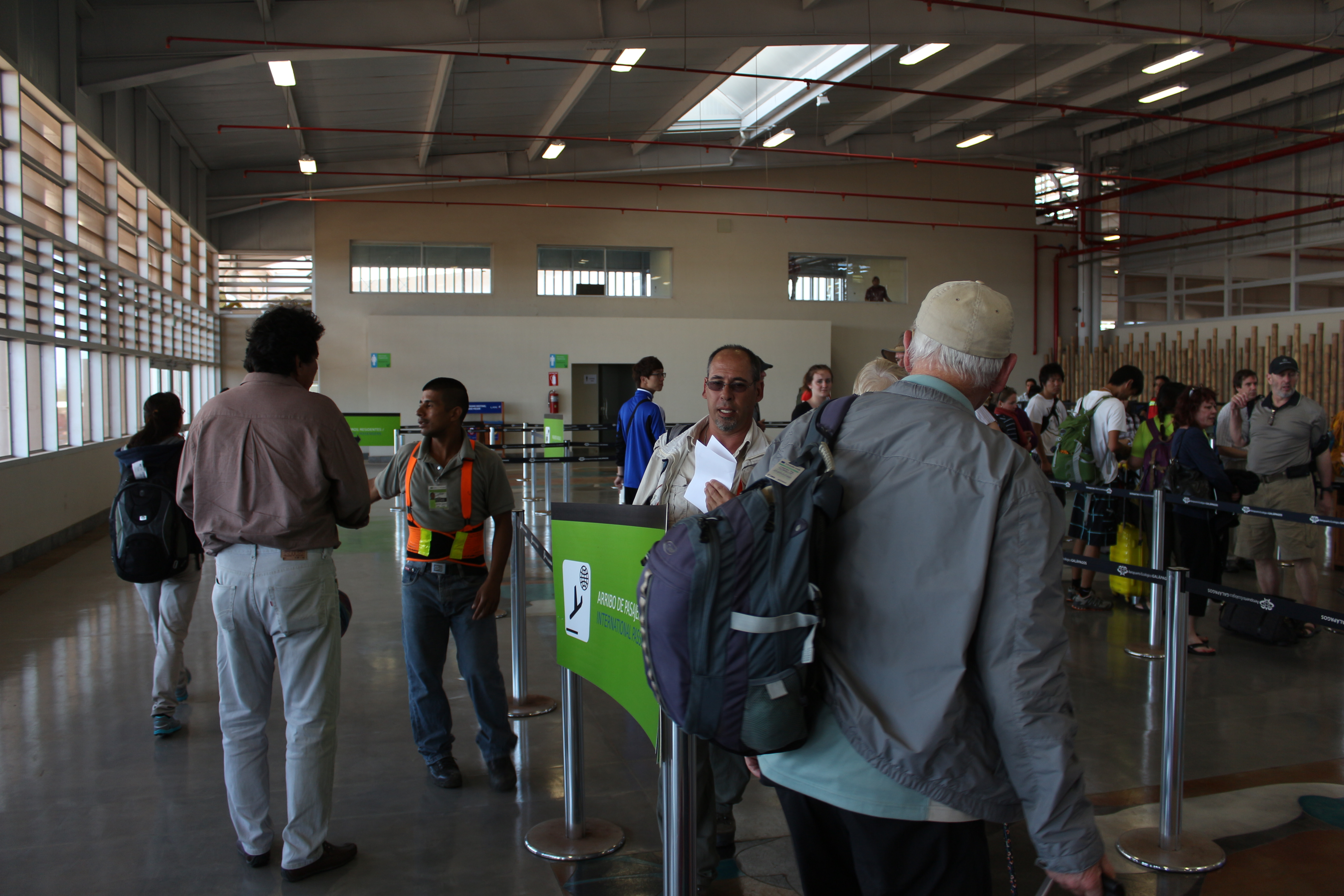
Inside of new building of Seymour Airport, Baltra Is., Galapagos Islands, Ecuador

Seymour Galapagos Ecological Airport (Spanish: Aeropuerto Ecológico Galápagos Seymour) (IATA: GPS, ICAO: SEGS) is an airport serving the island of Baltra, one of the Galápagos Islands in Ecuador.

== Name ==
The airport preserves part of Baltra's other name, South Seymour Island, named in honour of George Francis Seymour, Commander-in-Chief of the Pacific Station (1844-1847).

== Facilities ==
The terminal, which consists of recycled steel tubes taken from oil drilling operations in the Amazon, is spread over 6,000 square meters and required an investment of just over $24 million. The new complex will use clean, renewable technologies such as solar energy, wind farms, and seawater desalination, among other environmental innovations.

According to ECOGAL, the company that operates the terminal, the construction of the new airport took into account the surrounding environment and sought to make a minimal impact on the ecosystem. The project was announced in 2008, with construction commencing in 2012. The purpose of the redevelopment from the outset was to create the world's first ecological airport. ECOGAL was awarded a 15-year concession to administer and operate the airport.

== History ==
During World War II, the airport (then known as Seymour Island Airfield) was used by the United States Army Air Forces Sixth Air Force defending the South American coastline and the Panama Canal against Japanese submarines. The first American personnel arrived on 9 April 1942. Military flying units assigned to the airport were:

- 52d Fighter Squadron (32d Fighter Group), 5 June-1 December 1942 (P-40 Warhawk)
- 51st Fighter Squadron (32d Fighter Group, later XXVI Fighter Command) 9 December 1942 – 4 March 1944 (P-40 Warhawk)

Detachments stationed at Salinas Afld, Ecuador, and Talara Afld, Peru, December 1942-March 1943

- 3d Bombardment Squadron (6th Bombardment Group) 4 May 1942 – 12 March 1943 (LB-30 (B-24A) Liberator)
- 29th Bombardment Squadron (6th Bombardment Group) 13 May 1943 – 10 April 1944; 26 April–October 1945 (B-24 Liberator)
- 45th Bombardment Squadron (40th Bombardment Group) 18 February-22 May 1943 (LB-30 (B-24A) Liberator)
- 74th Bombardment Squadron (VI Bomber Command) 21 August 1944 – 13 February 1945 (B-24 Liberator)
- 397th Bombardment Squadron (VI Bomber Command) 7 April 1944 – 6 February 1945 (B-24 Liberator)

By 30 September 1945, most personnel were withdrawn, and only a housekeeping staff remained. The military facility was deactivated on 30 April 1946, leaving a communications unit, which was deactivated on 29 February 1948. Today, many of the former USAAF aircraft parking hardstands still exist, along with an unused NW/SE runway that was abandoned after the war but remains in reasonable condition.

== Airlines and destinations ==
Airlines	Destinations
Avianca Ecuador	Guayaquil, Quito
LATAM Ecuador	Cuenca, Guayaquil, Quito

== Statistics ==
Busiest domestic routes from Seymour Airport (2018)
Rank	City	Passengers	Top carriers
1	(Pichincha Province) Quito, Pichincha	291,765	Avianca Ecuador, LATAM Ecuador, Aeroregional
2	(Guayas Province) Guayaquil, Guayas	229,034	Avianca Ecuador, LATAM Ecuador, Aeroregional

== See also ==
- Transport in Ecuador
- List of airports in Ecuador
