= Lago Agrio Airport =

Airport in Sucumbíos, Ecuador

- IATA: LGQ; ICAO: SENL

Summary
- Airport type: Public
- Operator: Government
- Serves: Nueva Loja, Ecuador
- Elevation AMSL: 982 ft (299 m)
- Coordinates: 00°05′35″N 76°52′05″W

Map
- Location of airport in Ecuador

Runways
Direction	Length		Surface
Direction	m	ft	Surface
06/24	2,310	7,579	Asphalt
- Source: WAD GCM

Lago Agrio Airport (Spanish: Aeropuerto de Lago Agrio) (IATA: LGQ, ICAO: SENL) is an airport serving Nueva Loja (also known as Lago Agrio), the capital of Sucumbíos Province in Ecuador.

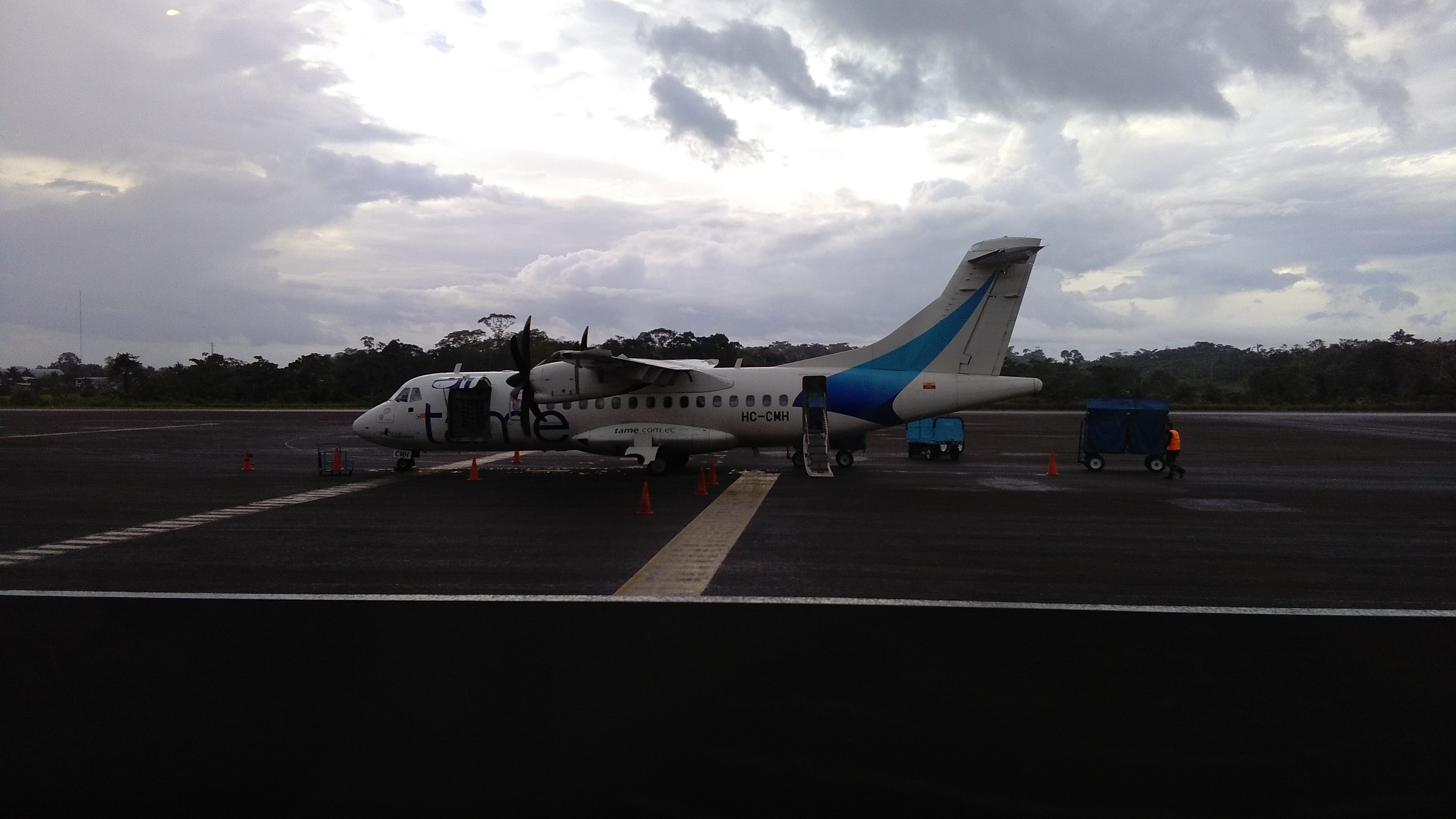
TAME ATR 42–500 at Lago Agrio

== See also ==
- Transport in Ecuador
- List of airports in Ecuador
