= Ciudad de Catamayo Airport =

Ciudad de Catamayo Airport Camilo Ponce Enriquez Airport
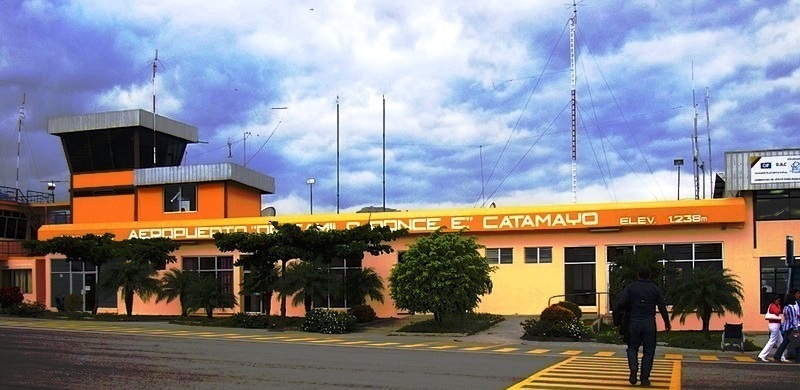
- IATA: LOH; ICAO: SECA

Summary
- Airport type: Public
- Serves: Loja, Ecuador
- Location: Catamayo
- Elevation AMSL: 4,056 ft (1,236 m)
- Coordinates: 03°59′45″S 79°22′20″W

Map
- Location of airport in Ecuador

Runways
Direction	Length		Surface
Direction	m	ft	Surface
07/25	2,000	6,562	Asphalt
- Sources: GCM Google Maps

Ciudad de Catamayo Airport, formerly known as Camilo Ponce Enriquez Airport (IATA: LOH, ICAO: SECA) is an airport serving Loja, the capital of the Loja Province in southern Ecuador. Its name was changed from Camilo Ponce Enriquez Airport (after a former president of the country) to Ciudad de Catamayo Airport on 13 May 2013.

The airport is at Catamayo, a city in a mountain valley 18 kilometres (11 mi) west of Loja. There is rising terrain south of the airport, and mountainous terrain in all other quadrants. The Loja non-directional beacon (Ident: LOJ) is located on the field. Several sources still list the airport ICAO code as SETM.

== Airlines and destinations ==
Airlines	Destinations
Aeroregional	Quito

== Accidents and incidents ==
- On 19 November 1979, an Ecuadorian Army IAI Arava 201 crashed on takeoff, killing all 16 people on board. General Rafael Rodríquez Palacios and his wife and daughter were among the dead.
- On 14 July 1980, Vickers Viscount HC-BHB of Aerolíneas Cóndor was damaged beyond economic repair in a landing accident.

== See also ==
- Transport in Ecuador
- List of airports in Ecuador
