= Francisco de Orellana Airport =

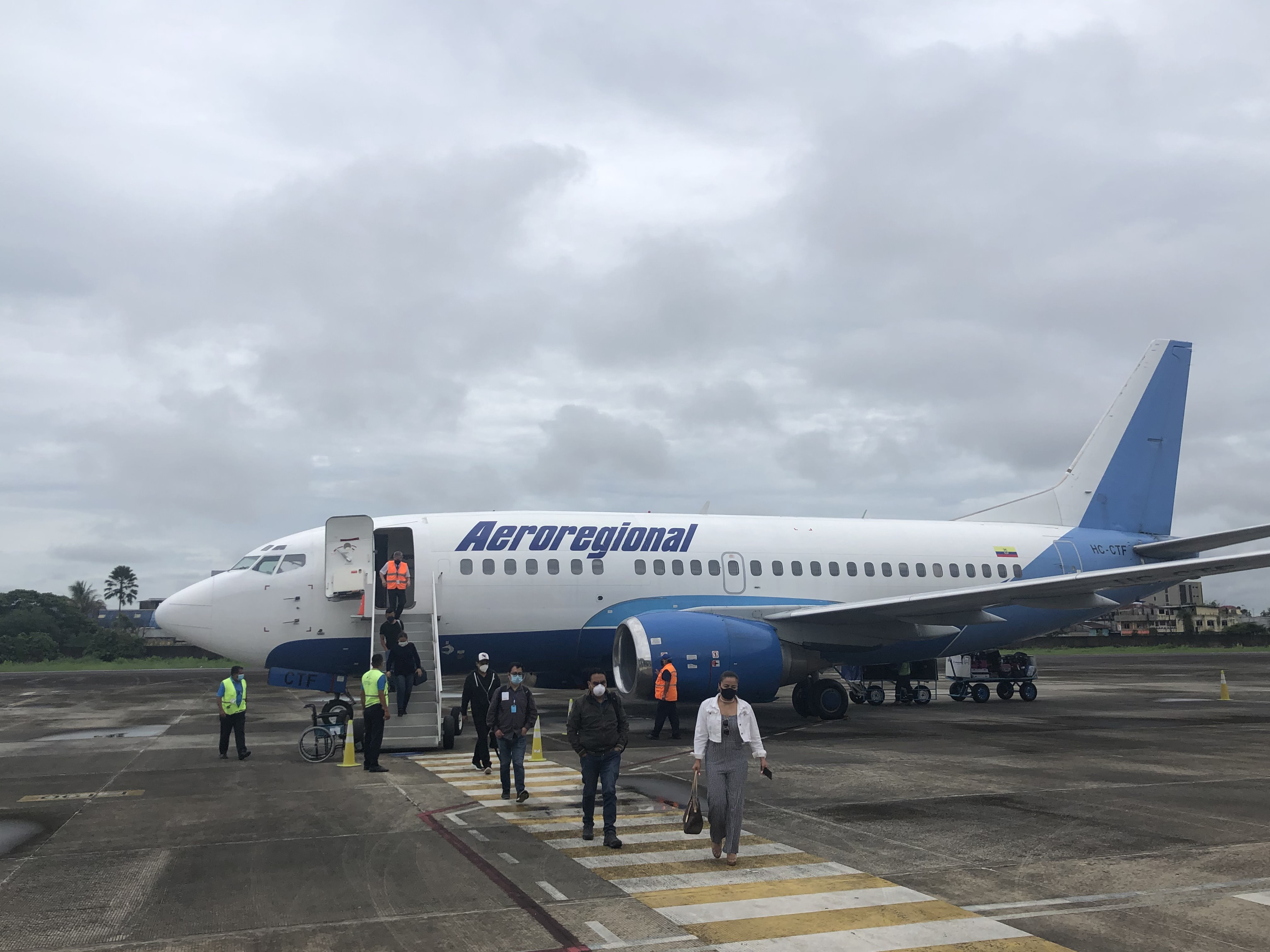
- IATA: OCC; ICAO: SECO

Summary
- Airport type: Public
- Operator: Government
- Serves: Puerto Francisco de Orellana, Ecuador
- Elevation AMSL: 834 ft (254 m)
- Coordinates: 0°27′40″S 76°59′15″W

Map
- Location of airport in Ecuador

Runways
Direction	Length		Surface
Direction	m	ft	Surface
16/34	2,305	7,562	Asphalt
- Source: WAD GCM

Francisco de Orellana Airport (IATA: OCC, ICAO: SECO) is an airport serving Puerto Francisco de Orellana (also known as Coca), the capital of Orellana Province in Ecuador. The airport is within the town, running parallel to the Coca River.

== Airlines and destinations ==
Airlines	Destinations
Aeroregional	Quito
LATAM Ecuador	Quito

== See also ==
- Transport in Ecuador
- List of airports in Ecuador
