= Colonel Carlos Concha Torres Airport =

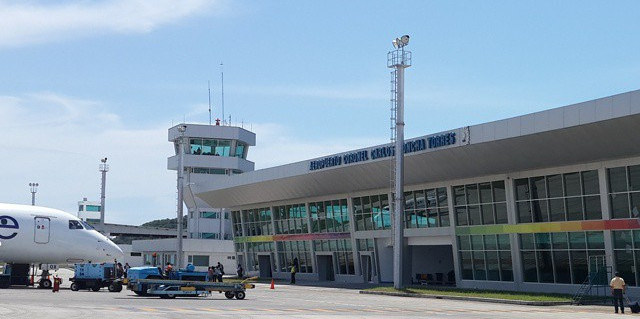
- IATA: ESM; ICAO: SETN

Summary
- Airport type: Public
- Operator: Dirección General de Aviación Civil
- Serves: Esmeraldas, Ecuador
- Location: Tachina, Esmeraldas Province, Ecuador
- Elevation AMSL: 32 ft / 10 m
- Coordinates: 00°58′40″N 79°37′36″W

Map
- Location of the airport in Ecuador

Runways
Direction	Length		Surface
Direction	m	ft	Surface
19/01	2,555	8,383	Asphalt
- Sources: GCM

Colonel Carlos Concha Torres Airport (Spanish: Aeropuerto Coronel Carlos Concha Torres) (IATA: ESM, ICAO: SETN) is an airport serving the Pacific coastal city of Esmeraldas, capital of the Esmeraldas Province of Ecuador. It is 3 kilometres (1.9 mi) east of the city, across the Esmeraldas River in the parish of Tachina. Established in 1940 as General Rivadeneira Airport, the airport was renovated between 2012 and 2013, receiving a new terminal and a lengthened runway.

== History ==
The airport was established on 25 March 1940, upon the upgrading of the runway. It was originally named in honor of José Enrique Rivadeneira, an inspector general of the Ecuadorian navy who died in a 1939 plane crash.

The Ecuadorian government renovated the airport in 2014 as part of a plan to modernise the country's airports and attract more tourists and businesses to Ecuador. It also held a contest in which the people of Esmeraldas voted on a new namesake. Carlos Concha Torres (es), an army commander who led a war against President Leónidas Plaza in the 1910s, received the most votes.

The airport also serves international flights to Colombia, which is served by Aeroregional but it was ended years later.

== Facilities ==
The newly constructed passenger terminal was inaugurated on 14 January 2014 by President Rafael Correa. The terminal has a capacity for 275 passengers and can handle 250,000 per year.

A new apron and air traffic control tower were also built, and the runway was lengthened by 200 metres (660 ft). Additional work was completed on taxiways, fuel plant, and other facilities. The construction work cost over US$45 million and lasted 17 months.

== See also ==
- Transport in Ecuador
- List of airports in Ecuador
