= List of airlines of Ecuador =

This is a list of operators which have an Air Operator Certificate issued by the Civil Aviation Authority of Ecuador.

== Active ==
Airline	Image	IATA	ICAO	Callsign	Hub(s)	Founded	Notes
Aeromaster Airways					Mariscal Sucre International Airport	1989	
Aeroregional			RER	REGAIR	Mariscal Sucre International Airport	2018	
Avianca Ecuador		2K	GLG	GALAPAGOS	José Joaquín de Olmedo International Airport; Mariscal Sucre International Airport	2014	
Citiair de Aviación					José Joaquín de Olmedo International Airport	2019	Air taxi.
Ecuatoriana Airlines					José Joaquín de Olmedo International Airport; Mariscal Sucre International Airport	2020	Proposed.
Emetebe Taxi Aéreo			EMT		San Cristóbal Airport	1995	
LATAM Airlines Ecuador		XL	LNE	AEROLANE	José Joaquín de Olmedo International Airport; Mariscal Sucre International Airport	2016	

== Defunct ==
Airline	Image	IATA	ICAO	Callsign	Founded	Ceased operations	Notes
AECA Carga		2A	EAE	AECA	1977	1998	
Aero InterContinental				ARICSA	1993	1994	
Aero Shell			ESH		1987	2001	
Aerotaxis Ecuatorianos			TXU	ATESA	1960	2006	
AeroGal		2K	GLG	AEROGAL	1985	2014	Rebranded as Avianca Ecuador.
Air Cuenca		E9		AIR CUENCA	2009	2011	
ANDES - Aerolineas Nacionales del Ecuador		ED	EDA	ANDES	1961	1998	
AREA - Aerovias Ecuatorianas		RE			1948	1970	
Austro Aéreo			UST	AUSTRO AÉREO	1996	2003	
Avioandes			AYH	AVIOANDES	2007	2025	Certificate revoked.
DHL Ecuador		7T	RTM	AERO TRANSAM	1991	2025	
Ecuacóndor					2017	2025	Never launched.
Ecuatoriana de Aviación		EU	EEA	ECUATORIANA	1957	2006	
Equair		HN	EQX	EQUINOX	2020	2023	
Equinoccial Air Cargo					1999	2004	
Icaro Air		X8	ICD	ICARO	1971	2011	
LAN Ecuador		XL	LNE	AEROLANE	2002	2016	Renamed to LATAM Airlines Ecuador.
Línea Aérea Cuencana		L5	LAC	LACECUADOR	2012	2018	
SAEREO		MZ	SRO	SAEREO	1994	2017	
SAETA		EH	SET	SAETA	1966	2000	
SAN Ecuador		WB	SAN	AEREOS	1964	1999	
Sudamericana de Aviación					2014	2015	Never launched.
TAME		EQ	TAE	TAME	1962	2020	
Transportes Aéreos Orientales			TAO		1948	2012	
Vías Aéreas Manabitas			MBT	MANABITAS	1977	1995	
Vuelos Internos Privados		V6	VUR	VIPEC	1997	2011	Merged with AeroGal.

== See also ==
- List of defunct airlines of Ecuador
- List of airlines
