= Austro Aéreo =

Ecuadorian airline

IATA	ICAO	Call sign
-	UST	AUSTRO AÉREO
- Founded: November 11, 1996
- Ceased operations: December 31, 2003
- Hubs: Mariscal Lamar International Airport
- Fleet size: 2
- Destinations: 4
- Key people: Alfredo Vega (Manager)
- Employees: 107 (2003)

Austro Aéreo S.A. was an Ecuadorian airline that operated scheduled passenger services throughout Ecuador.

== History ==
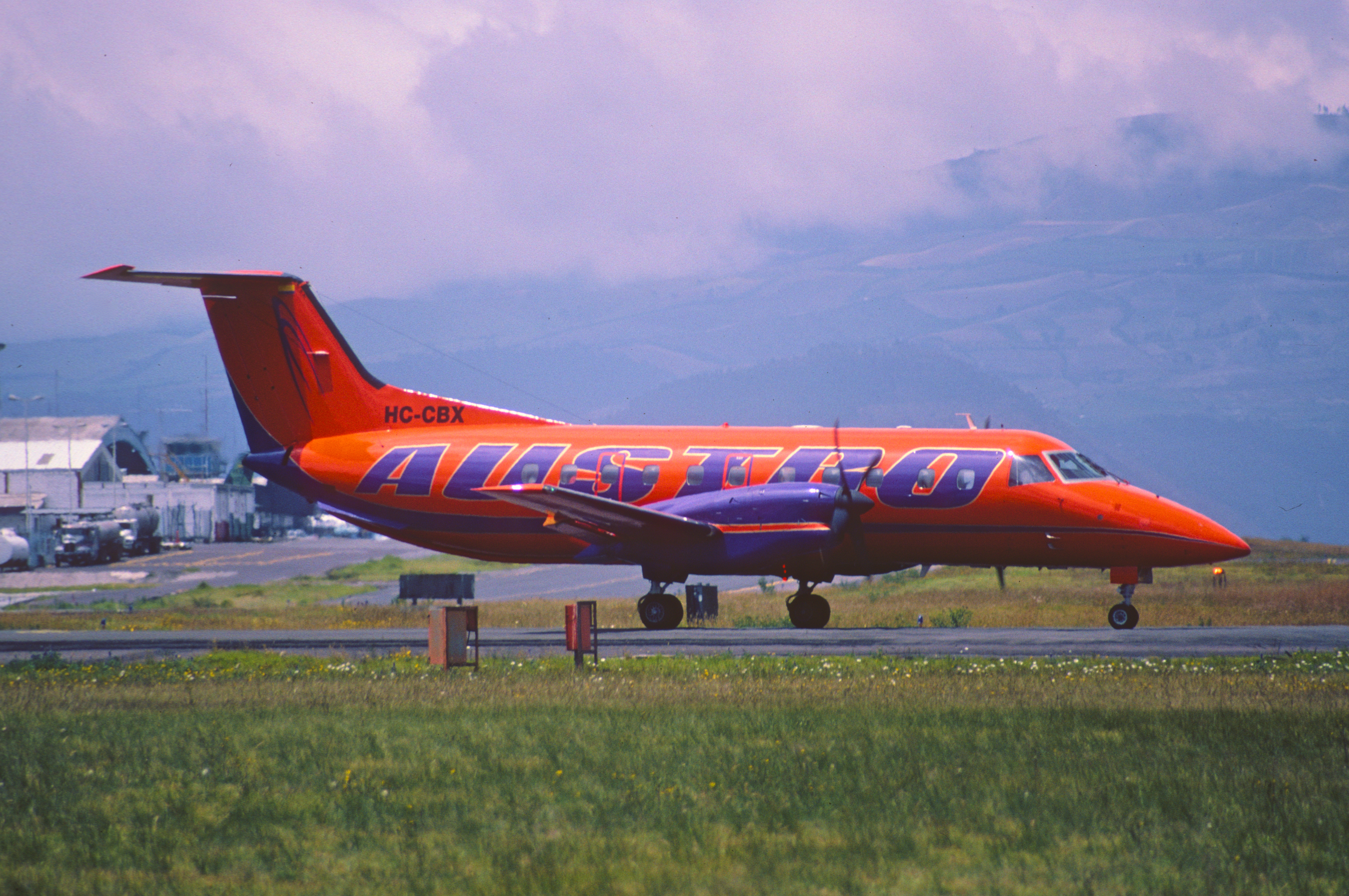
An Austro Aéreo Embraer EMB 120 Brasilia at the Old Mariscal Sucre International Airport in 2002

The company was inaugurated on November 11, 1996. The airline offered regular flights between the cities of Cuenca. Macas, Quito and Guayaquil. Austro Aereo had a limited number of planes and had many problems with them. Its only aircraft, a Fairchild FH-227, was grounded because it failed a "major inspection". The repair costs would have been very high, so Austro Aéreo opted not to repair it and instead acquired two new Embraer EMB 120 Brasilias.

The company got into financial difficulties in 2002 and stopped flying to Guayaquil in December of that year. Three million dollars were owed to the sellers of the aircraft, the suppliers of the Pratt & Whitney engines, the Ecuadorian Institute of Social Security and the tax authorities. 107 employees lost their jobs and the company was put into liquidation on December 31, 2003.

== Destinations ==
Ecuador

- Cuenca (Mariscal Lamar International Airport) Hub
- Guayaquil (José Joaquín de Olmedo International Airport)
- Macas (Edmundo Carvajal Airport)
- Quito (Old Mariscal Sucre International Airport)

== Fleet ==
Austro Aéreo operated the following aircraft:

Austro Aéreo fleet
Aircraft	Total	Introduced	Retired	Notes
Embraer EMB 120 Brasilia	2	2000	2003	Leased from Boeing Capital
Fairchild FH-227	1	1996	2000	

== See also ==
- List of defunct airlines of Ecuador
