= SAEREO =

IATA	ICAO	Call sign
MZ	SRO	SAEREO
- Founded: 1994
- Ceased operations: 2017
- Hubs: Old Mariscal Sucre International Airport (until 2013); Mariscal Sucre International Airport (2013-2017)
- Fleet size: 4
- Destinations: 7
- Headquarters: Quito, Ecuador
- Website: saereo.misiva.com.ec

SAEREO (legally Servicios Aéreos Ejecutivos Saereo S.A.) was a regional airline based in Quito, Ecuador. It operates charter and domestic passenger services, as well as medivac flights.

== Destinations ==
SAEREO operated services to the following:

Ecuador

- Guayaquil - José Joaquín de Olmedo International Airport
- Loja - Ciudad de Catamayo Airport
- Macas - Edmundo Carvajal Airport
- Quito - Mariscal Sucre International Airport Hub
- Santa Rosa, El Oro - Santa Rosa International Airport

Peru

- Lima - Jorge Chávez International Airport
- Piura - PAF Captain Guillermo Concha Iberico International Airport

== Fleet ==
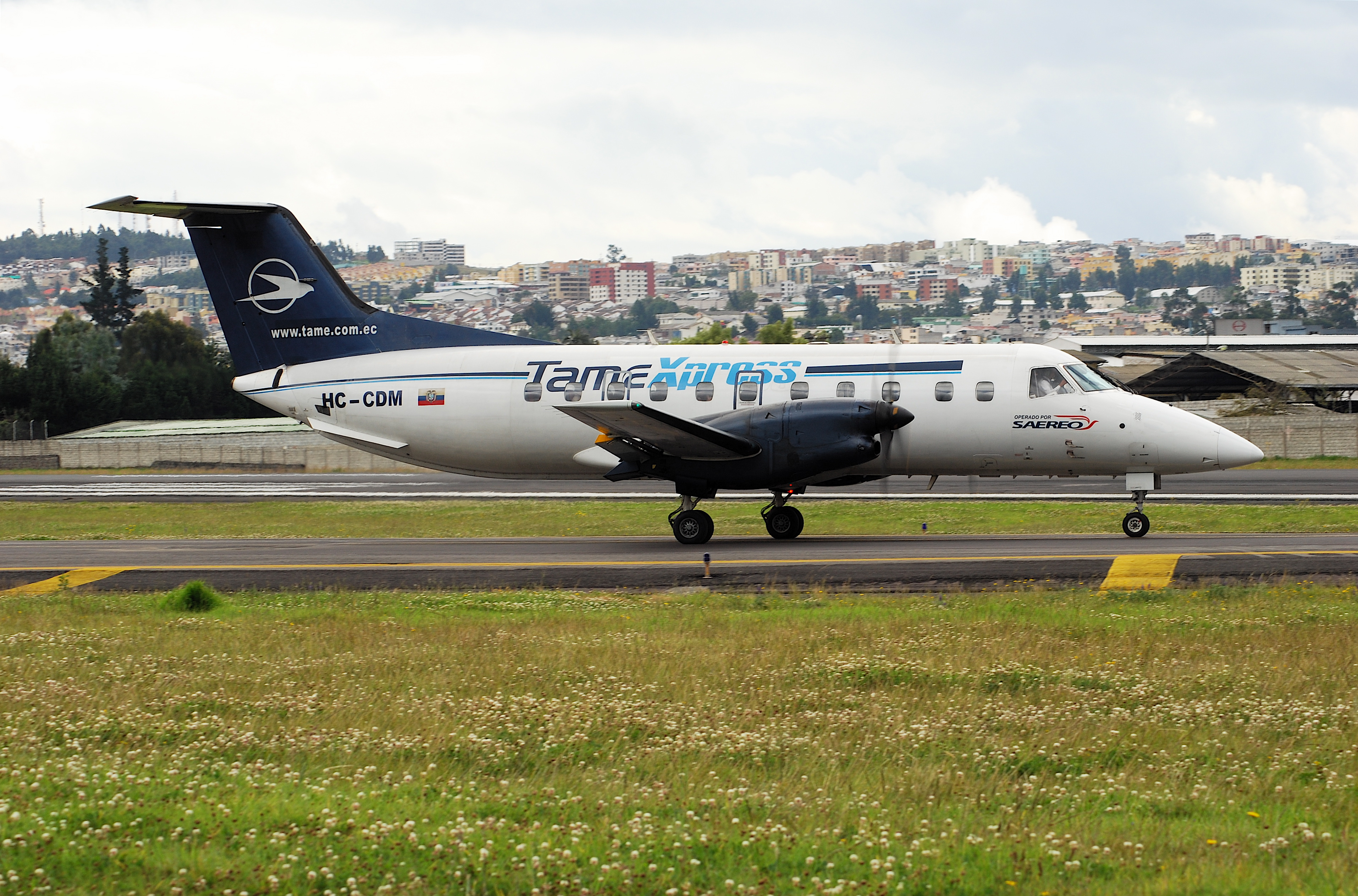
A SAEREO Embraer EMB-120, operated for TAME Xpress, taxiing at the Old Mariscal Sucre International Airport in 2008

The SAEREO fleet included the following aircraft in August 2006:

- 1 Bell 407
- 1 Beechcraft 1900C
- 1 Beechcraft 1900D
- 2 Embraer EMB-120ER Brasilia (Operated as TAME Xpress)
- 1 Rockwell Commander 690

== See also ==
- List of defunct airlines of Ecuador
