= SAETA Flight 011 =

SAETA Flight 011 may refer to:

- SAETA Flight 011 (1976): A Plane crash in the Chimborazo Volcano in 1976.
- SAETA Flight 011 (1979): A Plane crash close to the city of Shell Mera in 1979.
