= Saeta =

Saeta may refer to:

== Culture ==
- Saeta (brand), a Colombian company that operates its business in the textile sector, in the manufacture, import and export of sportswear and accessories
- Saeta (flamenco), a revered form of Spanish religious song
- Saetia, indie screamo band
- "Saeta", a track on the Miles Davis album Sketches of Spain
- "Saeta", a track on the Nico album Drama of Exile
- Saeta rubia, a 1956 Spanish film directed by Florián Rey
- Saeta TV Channel 10, an Uruguayan television channel
- Saetan Daemon SaDiablo, a fictional character in Anne Bishop's 'The Black Jewels trilogy

== Transports ==
- SAETA (Sociedad Anónima Ecuatoriana de Transportes Aéreos), an Ecuadorian airline
  - SAETA Flight 232, a reported missing flight in 1976
- Hispano HA-200 Saeta, a 1950s Spanish jet training aircraft
- Saeta Perú, a Peruvian airline
