= Flight 11 =

Flight 11 or Flight 011 may refer to:

- Continental Airlines Flight 11, suicide-bombed and crashed near Unionville, Missouri on May 22, 1962
- SAETA Flight 011, crashed on August 15, 1976 after being reported missing and its wreckage being located twenty-six years later
- SAETA Flight 011, crashed on April 23, 1979 after unsuccessfully reaching its destination and its wreckage being located five years later
- Avianca Flight 011, crashed while attempting to land at Madrid on November 27, 1983
- American Airlines Flight 11, hijacked and crashed into the World Trade Center in New York City on September 11, 2001
- Air Bagan Flight 011, struck power lines and crash-landed on final approach to Heho, Myanmar on December 25, 2012
- Starship flight test 11, a successful test flight of SpaceX Starship in October 2025
