= Sucúa Airport =

- IATA: ~~SUQ~~; ICAO: ~~SESC~~

Summary
- Airport type: Public
- Serves: Sucúa, Ecuador
- Elevation AMSL: 3,116 ft (950 m)
- Coordinates: 2°28′15″S 78°10′10″W

Map
- Location of the airport in Ecuador

Runways
Direction	Length		Surface
Direction	m	ft	Surface
06/24	730	2,395	Grass
- Sources: GCM HERE/Nokia Maps

Sucúa Airport ~~(IATA: SUQ, ICAO: SESC)~~ was an airport serving the town of Sucúa in Morona-Santiago Province, Ecuador.

The runway parallels the main road entering Sucúa from the south. The Macas non-directional beacon (Ident: MAS) is located 11.1 nautical miles (21 km) north-northeast of the airport. The Macas VOR-DME (Ident: MSV) is located 14.0 nautical miles (26 km) north-northeast of Sucúa Airport.

The airstrip has since been converted into a park (opened in 2020), and occasional flights were diverted to the better-equipped Edmundo Carvajal Airport in Macas, located 26.5 km away.

== See also ==
- List of airports in Ecuador
- Transport in Ecuador
