= General Manuel Serrano Airport =

- IATA: MCH; ICAO: SEMH

Summary
- Airport type: Closed
- Serves: Machala, Ecuador
- Elevation AMSL: 11 ft / 3 m
- Coordinates: 03°16′08″S 79°57′41″W

Map
- Location of the airport in Ecuador

Runways
Direction	Length		Surface
Direction	ft	m	Surface
Closed
- Source: Google Maps

General Manuel Serrano Airport (Spanish: Aeropuerto General Manuel Serrano) (IATA: MCH, ICAO: SEMH) is a closed airport formerly serving Machala, the capital of El Oro Province in Ecuador.

The airport has been replaced by Coronel Artilleria Victor Larrea Airport in Santa Rosa, 19 kilometres (12 mi) to the south.

The entire Terminal building including the Tower can be seen on Av. San josé road

== See also ==
- Transport in Ecuador
- List of airports in Ecuador
