= SCY =

SCY may refer to:

- San Cristóbal Airport, Ecuador, IATA airport code
- Short course yards, in competitive swimming
- South Croydon railway station, London, National Rail station code
- Supreme Court of Yukon, the court of general jurisdiction for the Canadian territory of Yukon
