= Chimborazo Airport =

Airport serving Riobamba, Ecuador

- IATA: none; ICAO: SERB

Summary
- Airport type: Public
- Serves: Riobamba, Ecuador
- Elevation AMSL: 9,150 ft / 2,789 m
- Coordinates: 1°39′15″S 78°39′25″W

Map
- Location of the airport in Ecuador

Runways
Direction	Length		Surface
Direction	m	ft	Surface
05/23	1,600	5,249	Asphalt
- Sources: GCM Google Maps

Chimborazo Airport (ICAO: SERB) is an airport serving the city of Riobamba in Chimborazo Province, Ecuador.

The Riobamba non-directional beacon (ident: RIO) is located on the field.

== See also ==
- List of airports in Ecuador
- Transport in Ecuador
