= Vuelos Internos Privados =

IATA	ICAO	Call sign
V6	VUR	VIPEC
- Founded: 1997
- Commenced operations: July 1997
- Ceased operations: 2012 (merged into AeroGal)
- Hubs: Old Mariscal Sucre International Airport
- Secondary hubs: José Joaquín de Olmedo International Airport
- Frequent-flyer program: LifeMiles
- Fleet size: 3
- Destinations: 7
- Parent company: AviancaTaca Holding
- Headquarters: Quito, Ecuador
- Website: www.vipec.com

Vuelos Internos Privados VIP S.A. was an Ecuadorian regional airline based at the Old Mariscal Sucre International Airport and headquartered in Quito, Ecuador. It operated domestic and regional services. The airline was a subsidiary of Avianca and part of the AviancaTaca Holding, which was owned by Synergy Group.

== History ==
VIP was founded in 1997 as a charter company rendering services only to associated members. In July 1997, the company started to operate charter flights, transporting passengers and cargo between regional destinations in Ecuador. The airline was also active in charter traffic, including for the oil industry.

In 2001, VIP began operating regular commercial flights. In 2003, it became part of the Synergy Group as part of a strategy to create a continent-wide airline under the Avianca brand, which owned 100% of its stock.

In October 2011, the airline was jointly managed by AeroGal, who under its aircraft operated two destinations of the airline, the sales, and distribution of tickets were also included in the itineraries and records of the airline that is part of the AviancaTaca Holding. In 2012, VIP was merged into AeroGal.

== Destinations ==
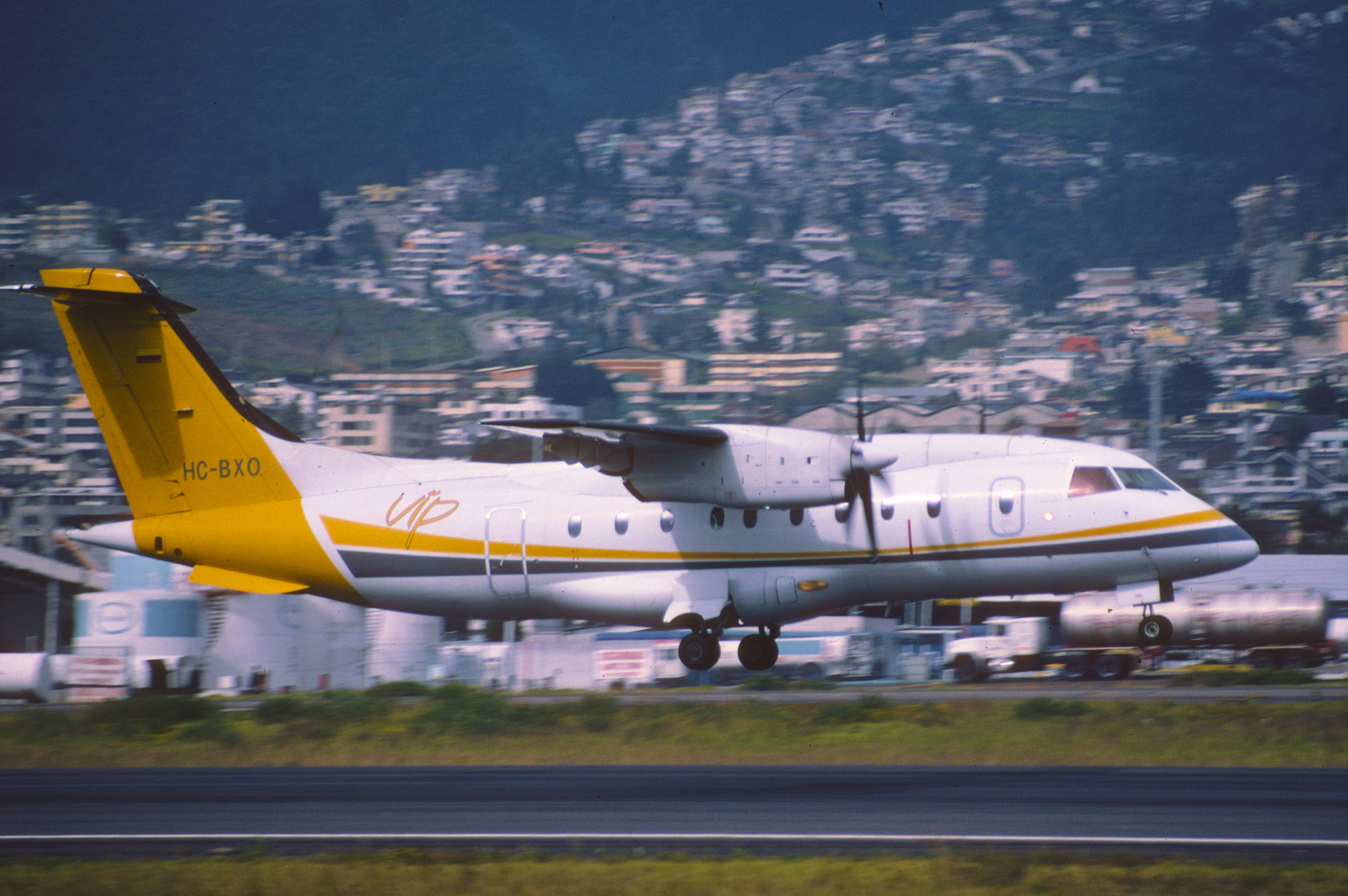
A VIP Dornier 328 landing at the Old Mariscal Sucre International Airport in 2002

Before VIP ceased operations, it operated to the following destinations:

Country	City	Airport	Notes
Ecuador	El Coca	Francisco de Orellana Airport	
Ecuador	Esmeraldas	General Rivadeneira Airport	
Ecuador	Guayaquil	José Joaquín de Olmedo International Airport	Hub
Ecuador	Lago Agrio	Lago Agrio Airport	
Ecuador	Manta	Eloy Alfaro International Airport	
Ecuador	Portoviejo	Reales Tamarindos Airport	Terminated
Ecuador	Quito	Old Mariscal Sucre International Airport	Hub
Ecuador	Salinas	General Ulpiano Paez Airport	

== Fleet ==
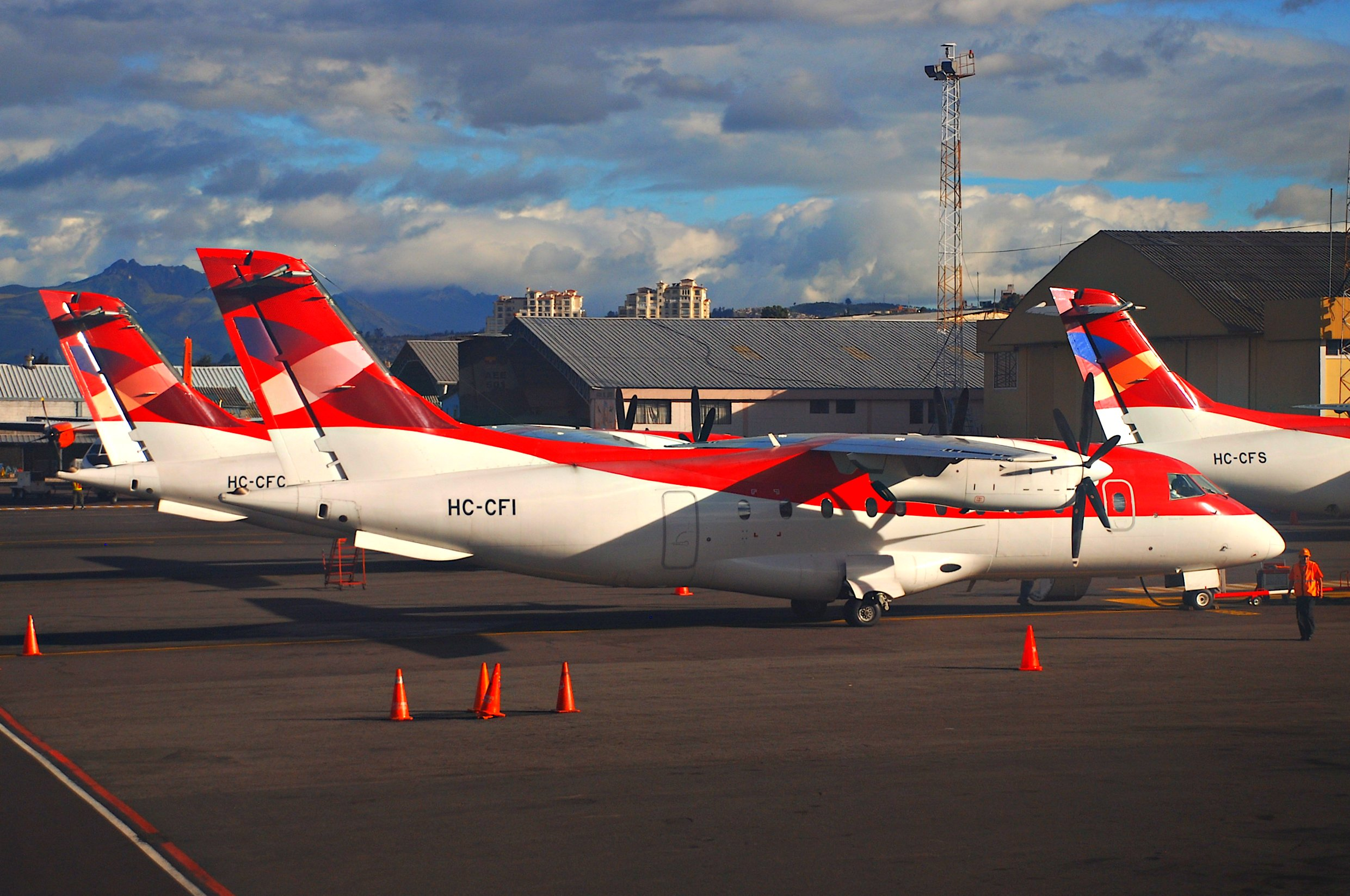
Three of VIP's last Dornier 328s parked at the Old Mariscal Sucre International Airport in 2008

VIP had formerly consisted the following aircraft:

VIP fleet
Aircraft	Total	Introduced	Retired	Notes
Dornier 328	6	1997	2012	1 leased from Swisswings; 3 sold to Aerolínea de Antioquia

== See also ==
- Avianca Ecuador
- List of defunct airlines of Ecuador
