= Los Perales Airport =

- IATA: BHA; ICAO: SESV

Summary
- Airport type: Public
- Serves: Bahía de Caráquez, Ecuador
- Location: San Vicente
- Elevation AMSL: 10 ft / 3 m
- Coordinates: 0°36′20″S 80°24′15″W

Map
- Location of the airport in Ecuador

Runways
Direction	Length		Surface
Direction	m	ft	Surface
15/33	2,200	7,218	Asphalt
- Sources: GCM Google Maps SkyVector

Los Perales Airport (IATA: BHA, ICAO: SESV) is an airport serving the city of Bahía de Caráquez in Manabí Province, Ecuador. The airport is across the Chone River from the city and is reached via a 1.7 kilometres (1 mi) causeway.

The Bahia de Caraquez non-directional beacon (ident: BCN) is located on the field. The Manta VOR-DME (Ident: MNV) is located 25.0 nautical miles (46 km) southwest of the airport.

== See also ==
- List of airports in Ecuador
- Transport in Ecuador
