= SAN Ecuador =

Airline of Ecuador (1964–1999)

SAN (Servicios Aéreos Nacionales)
IATA	ICAO	Call sign
WB	SAN	AEREOS
- Founded: January 21, 1964
- Ceased operations: 1999
- Hubs: Simón Bolívar International Airport
- Alliance: Ecuatoriana de Aviación (1970s)
- Fleet size: 3
- Destinations: 8
- Parent company: SAETA
- Headquarters: Guayaquil, Ecuador

SAN (legally Servicios Aéreos Nacionales S.A.) was an airline which was based in Guayaquil, Ecuador that was the domestic branch of the airline SAETA. It was founded in 1964, and ceased operations in 1999.

== History ==
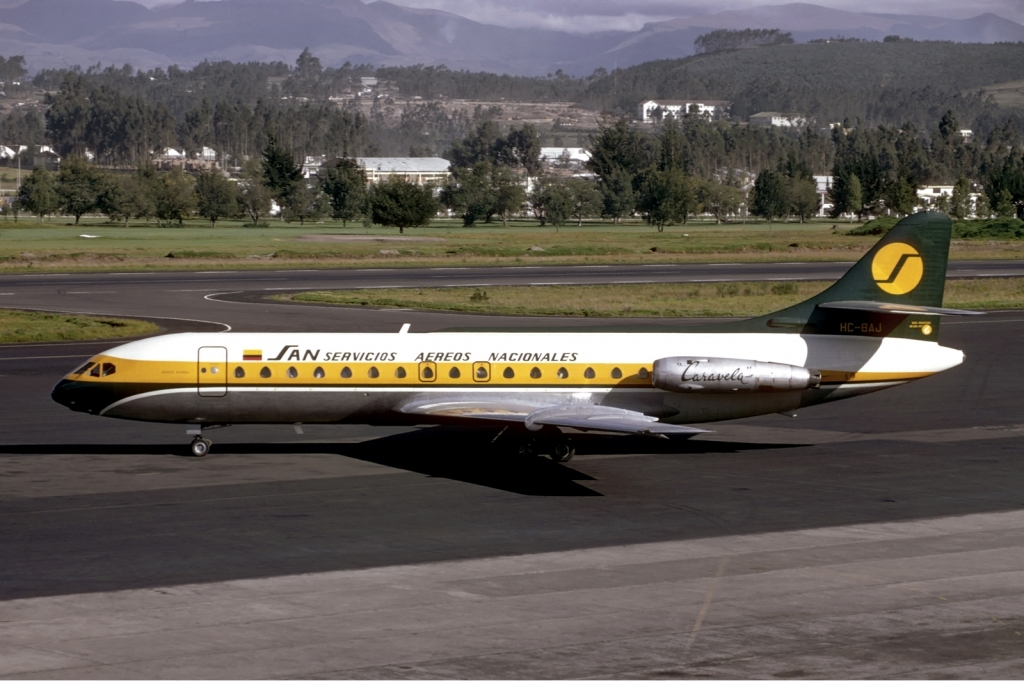
A SAN Sud Aviation Caravelle (reg. HC-BAJ) at the Old Mariscal Sucre International Airport in 1975. This aircraft crashed as Flight 832 in Guayaquil, in April 1983.

SAN was founded on January 21, 1964, providing commercial services within Ecuador with two Douglas C-47As. the first routes directly connected Cuenca with Guayaquil in passenger transport operations in 1966, these operations were daily.

In 1970, the company signed an alliance with Ecuatoriana de Aviación. That same year, SAN acquired two Vickers Viscount from All Nippon Airways. Its arrival in Ecuador and entry into service marked a decided modernization of the flight equipment, which allowed the company to continue operating its usual routes and inaugurate direct flights from Cuenca to Quito and for the routes to Guayaquil to be operated with its own teams.

In 1975, three Sud Aviation Caravelle were acquired from TAP Air Portugal, two of them are put into service on the frequencies assigned between the cities of Quito and Guayaquil and one was stored in Cuenca for to serve as a source of spare parts. SAN's intention was to operate with the Caravelles to and from Cuenca, but this was not authorized by the aeronautical authorities of that time.

In 1979, SAN purchased two Sud Caravelles from Luxair, one was used in service and the other for spare parts. In this period, the Cuenca investors who had a majority decided to sell their shares to a Guayaquil businessman. By 1981, two Boeing 727-100s were incorporated, which one maintained its fleet and the other one was sold to TAME.

In the early 1990s, SAN was absorbed by Ecuadorian airline SAETA, increasing its frequencies and fleet for national and international flights. But the next years were of absolute decline until in 1999, when the company definitively ceased operations.

== Destinations ==
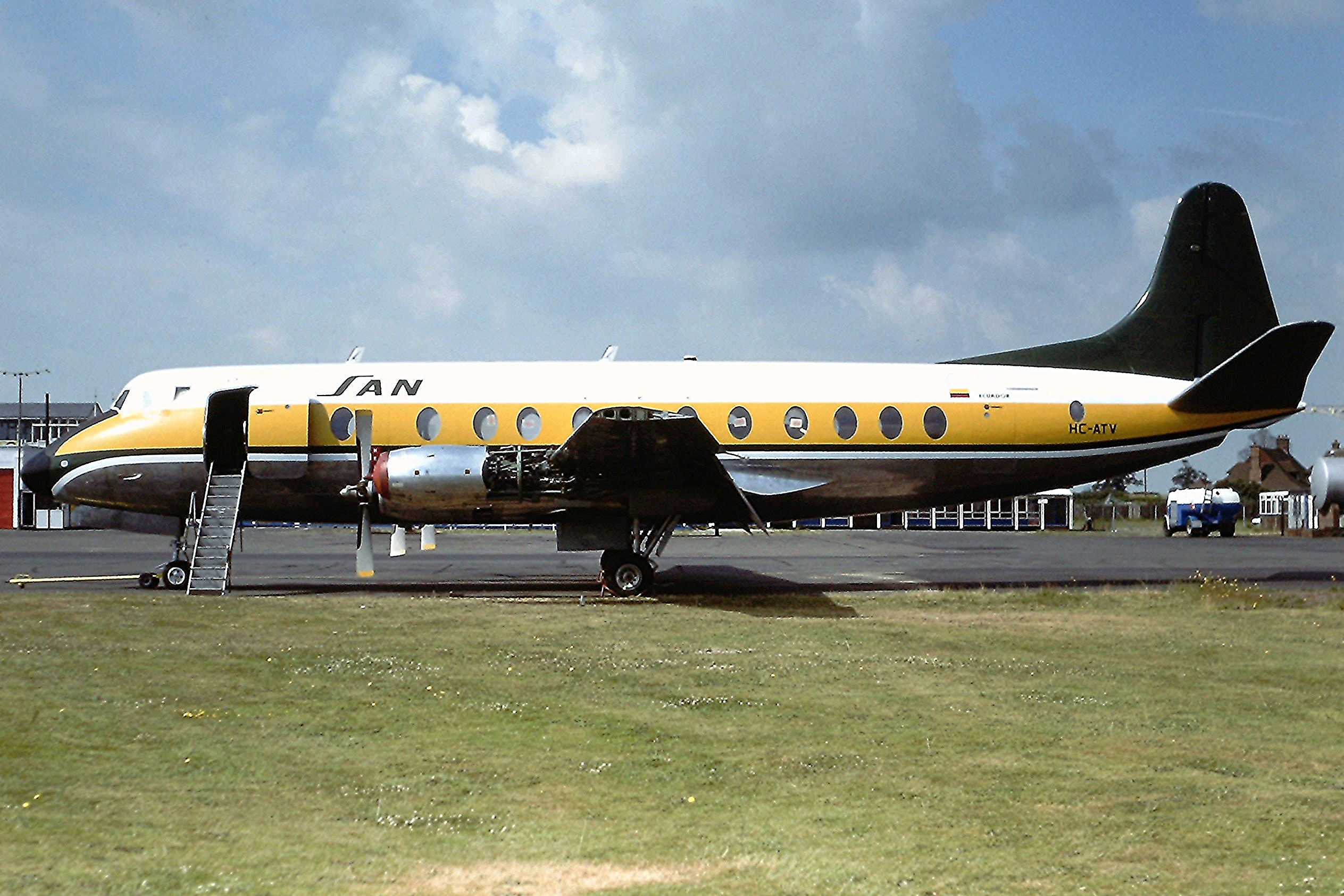
A SAN Vickers Viscount parked at Coventry Airport in July 1979

- Ecuador
  - Cuenca (Mariscal Lamar International Airport)
  - Esmeraldas (Colonel Carlos Concha Torres Airport)
  - Guayaquil (José Joaquín de Olmedo International Airport) Hub
  - Macas (Edmundo Carvajal Airport)
  - Manta (Eloy Alfaro International Airport)
  - Quito (Old Mariscal Sucre International Airport)
  - San Cristóbal Island (San Cristóbal Airport)
- United States
  - Miami (Miami International Airport)

== Fleet ==
SAN had operated the following aircraft:

SAN fleet
Aircraft	Total	Introduced	Retired	Notes
Boeing 727-100	2	1981	1998	
Boeing 727-200	1	1997	1999	Operated by SAETA
Douglas C-47A Skytrain	2	1964	1976	
Sud Aviation Caravelle	5	1975	1986	
Vickers Viscount 700D	4	1969	1982	
Vickers Viscount 800	2	1970	1982	

== Accidents and incidents ==
- On September 4, 1977, a Vickers Viscount (registered HC-BCL) crashed into a mountain in the Cajas Mountains, killing all 33 people on board.
- On December 29, 1977, a Vickers Viscount (registered HC-BEM) crashed into a hill near Cuenca. All 24 people on board were killed.
- On October 8, 1982, a Vickers Viscount (registered HC-ATV) was damaged beyond repairs after a runway excursion at Mariscal Lamar International Airport in Cuenca.
- On April 29, 1983, SAN Flight 832, a Sud Aviation Caravelle (registered HC-BAT) crashed at the southern end of the Simón Bolívar International Airport runway in Guayaquil after attempting to execute an emergency landing. The plane had suffered an engine failure shortly after taking off from Guayaquil on a flight to Quito, and the crew was returning to the airport. However, the second engine failed while overflying the city during the return and, with barely any power left and under the risk of stalling, Cap. Germán Cruz, crash-landed the plane in a muddy puddle produced by recent El Niño rain near the end of the runway, with the fuselage breaking in three parts. The accident killed 8 of the 100 people on board. The pilot had previously reported engine issues and had tested the plane the previous day, after which it was it was subjected to maintenance and was later reported as fit to fly shortly before the ill-fated flight.
