= Telerama (Ecuadorian TV channel) =

- Country: Ecuador
- Broadcast area: Azuay and Cañar provinces

Programming
- Picture format: 1080i HDTV

Ownership
- Owner: International Motors Company Inc. and Cardizales Oroibéricos S.A.

History
- Launched: November 3, 1993

Telerama (formerly known as ETV Telerama) is an Ecuadorian regional television channel, headquartered in Cuenca, Azuay Province. It started broadcasting on November 3, 1993, coinciding with the 173rd anniversary of the independence of Cuenca.

It produces a variety of programs, among them news bulletins, opinion, sports, entertainment, cultural and cooking shows.

Since March 2024, due to budget, legal and administrative problems, Telerama lost its national coverage, limiting itself to Azuay and Cañar, following the closure of its studios and relay stations in Guayaquil and Quito.

== History ==
Telerama started broadcasting in Cuenca on November 3, 1993. Four years later, on November 30, 1997, it launched in Guayaquil and, on July 14, 2001, in Quito. The station was managed by Teodoro Jerves Núñez del Arco, Jorge Eljuri Antón and Juan Eljuri Antón, the latter being the owner of Banco del Austro.

As of 2010, the channel had offices in Cuenca (main offices), Quito and Guayaquil, having installed a satellite link in June of that year. Historically, since launch, it was defined as a cultural channel; this began to change when, over the course of that year, the network started airing telenovelas, mostly from RCN and Caracol's catalogs (Guadalupe; Isabella, mujer enamorada; Pecados capitales, Pedro, el escamoso (in two timeslots); and from July 12, 2010, El Baile de la Vida), as well as Sábado Gigante and Qué dice la gente. The network continued to air its longtime cultural programming, which included documentaries from Deutsche Welle's Spanish service and historical documentaries from the BBC. By beginning to diversify its programming beyond a predominantly local, news and educational-driven output, Telerama had to become more competitive in the television market, also owing to the costs of the television industry. On December 10, 2010, Telerama introduced a new identity and the slogan Telerama, somos más in order to reposition itself. By then, the network was also airing two telenovelas produced by the former Rede Manchete (Dona Beija and Pantanal and planned to continue following local beauty pageants and fashion in 2011, as well as the ATP Challengers of Quito, Manta and Salinas.

During 2010, Grupo Eljuri announced the sale of Telerama, due to changes made to the Constitution of Ecuador, which in 2008 established that no group of banking entity could have shares in media outlets, and that the sale could happen in a two-year window. In 2013, a case of supposed false sale of the channel's shares came into light. They were aware that Banco Pichincha and Banco del Austro simulated the sale of their shares to International Motors Company Inc. and Cardizales Oroibéricos S.A., being alerted to the Superintendency of Banks of Ecuador.

In 2021, several former staff filed a lawsuit for non-payment of salaries and contributions to the Ecuadorian Social Securities Institute. It was also known that the companies of Grupo Eljuri, owner of the network, owed around US$600,000 to the channel.

== Bibliography ==
- Ludeña Quiroz, Silvio Renato (2018). La historia de la televisión en Cuenca desde su creación: personajes e instituciones. Revista Killkana Sociales. Vol. 2(1). Cuenca: Universidad Católica de Cuenca. pp. 41–48, 45 ppp.
- Ortiz, Carlos; Macas, Jhoe; González, Verónica; Coronel-Salas, Gabriela; Paladines, Fanny (2013). Análisis de las parrillas de programación de los canales de televisión de Ecuador (Actas – V Congreso Internacional Latina de Comunicación Social – V CILCS) (PDF). San Cristóbal de La Laguna - España: University of La Laguna. pp. 1, 4, 9–10, 14, 15–16, 17–22. Archived from the original (PDF) on March 8, 2022. ISBN 9788415698296
- Acosta Buenaño, Ana María; Calvopiña Panchi, Verónica; Cano Cañizares, Jorge (2017). Medios comunitarios y democratización de la comunicación en Ecuador: aporte para el debate sobre el Concurso Público de Frecuencias (PDF). Quito - Ecuador: Friedrich-Ebert-Stiftung (FES-ILDIS) Ecuador; Instituto Latinoamericano de Investigaciones Sociales (ILDIS). pp. 60, pp. 16–17. ISBN 978-9978941737.
