= Gualaquiza Airport =

- IATA: none; ICAO: SEGZ

Summary
- Airport type: Public
- Serves: Gualaquiza, Ecuador
- Elevation AMSL: 2,640 ft / 805 m
- Coordinates: 3°25′25″S 78°34′00″W

Map
- Location of the airport in Ecuador

Runways
Direction	Length		Surface
Direction	m	ft	Surface
16/34	2,012	6,601	Paved
- Sources: GCM Google Maps

Gualaquiza Airport (ICAO: SEGZ) is an airport serving the town of Gualaquiza in Morona-Santiago Province, Ecuador. The airport is at the entrance to a mountain valley, with nearby rising and high terrain west through north through east. The southern quadrants are open.

The Gualaquiza non-directional beacon (ident: GLZ) is located on the field.

== See also ==
- List of airports in Ecuador
- Transport in Ecuador
