= Taura Air Base =

- IATA: none; ICAO: SETA

Summary
- Airport type: Military
- Elevation AMSL: 56 ft / 17 m
- Coordinates: 2°15′40″S 79°40′50″W

Map
- Location of the airport in Ecuador

Runways
Direction	Length		Surface
Direction	m	ft	Surface
02/20	3,040	9,974	Asphalt
- Sources: GCM Google Maps

Taura Air Base (ICAO: SETA) is a military airport 24 kilometres (15 mi) east of Guayaquil in Guayas Province, Ecuador. The base is on the west bank of the Taura River.

== See also ==
- List of airports in Ecuador
- Transport in Ecuador
