= Taisha Airport =

Airport in Morona-Santiago Province, Ecuador

- IATA: TSC; ICAO: SETH

Summary
- Airport type: Public
- Serves: Taisha
- Elevation AMSL: 1,669 ft / 509 m
- Coordinates: 2°22′50″S 77°30′10″W

Map
- Location of the airport in Ecuador

Runways
Direction	Length		Surface
Direction	m	ft	Surface
18/36	1,200	3,937	Gravel
- Sources: GCM Google Maps

Taisha Airport (IATA: TSC, ICAO: SETH) is an airport serving the town of Taisha in Morona-Santiago Province, Ecuador.

The Taisha non-directional beacon (ident: TSH) is just south of the field.

== See also ==
- List of airports in Ecuador
- Transport in Ecuador
