= El Carmen Airport =

- IATA: none; ICAO: SEMO

Summary
- Airport type: Military
- Serves: Montalvo
- Elevation AMSL: 960 ft / 293 m
- Coordinates: 2°04′00″S 76°58′35″W

Map
- Location of the airport in Ecuador

Runways
Direction	Length		Surface
Direction	m	ft	Surface
09/27	1,330	4,364	Asphalt
- Sources: GCM Bing Maps SkyVector

El Carmen Airport (ICAO: SEMO) is an airport serving the Bobonaza River village of Montalvo in Pastaza Province, Ecuador. The runway is within a bend of the river, and approaches to either end will cross the water.

The Montalvo-El Carmen non-directional beacon (ident: MTL) is located near the runway.

== See also ==
- List of airports in Ecuador
- Transport in Ecuador
