= SEMC =

SEMC may refer to:

- ICAO airport code for Macas Airport in Macas, Ecuador
- Sawnee EMC, electrical cooperative in Cumming, Georgia, United States
- Snow Entomological Museum Collection at the University of Kansas Natural History Museum
- Acronym for "Social, Ethical, Moral and Cultural" factors in research and education
- Sony Ericsson Mobile Communications AB, now called Sony Mobile
- Super Evil Megacorp, makers of the video game Vainglory
