= List of airports in Ecuador =

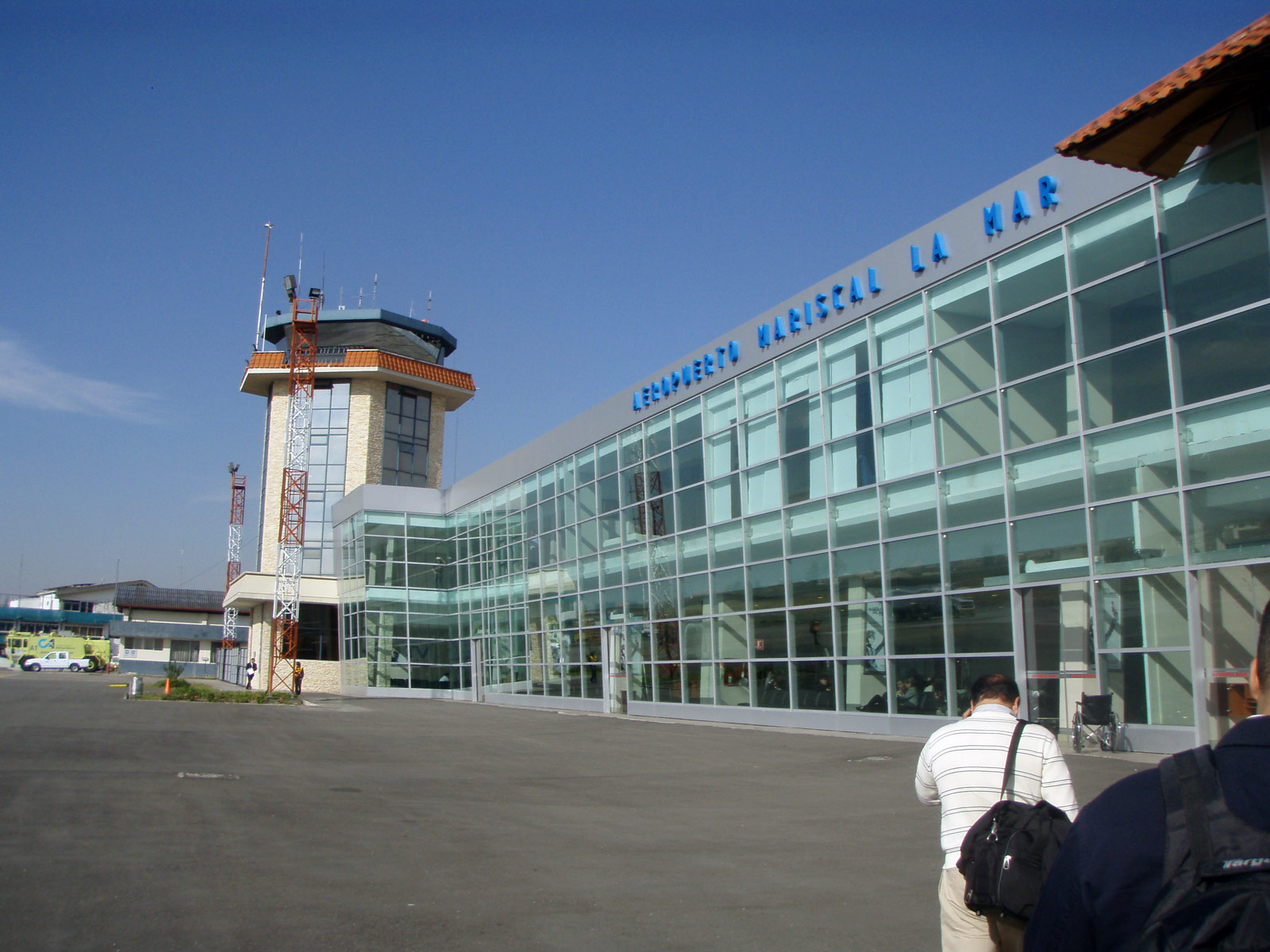
Image taken in Mariscal Lamar Airport

This is a list of airports in Ecuador, sorted by location.

== Airports ==
Airport names shown in bold indicate the airport has scheduled service on commercial airlines.

City served / location	Province	ICAO	IATA	Airport name	Coordinates
**International airports**
Baltra, Galápagos Islands	Galápagos	SEGS	GPS	**Seymour Airport**	00°27′14″S 90°15′57″W
Cuenca	Azuay	SECU	CUE	**Mariscal Lamar Airport**	02°53′22″S 78°59′04″W
Esmeraldas	Esmeraldas	SETN	ESM	Colonel Carlos Concha Torres Airport	00°58′43″N 79°37′36″W
Guayaquil	Guayas	SEGU	GYE	**José Joaquín de Olmedo International Airport** / Simón Bolívar Air Base	02°09′28″S 79°53′01″W
Latacunga	Cotopaxi	SELT	LTX	Cotopaxi International Airport	00°54′25″S 78°36′57″W
Manta	Manabí	SEMT	MEC	**Eloy Alfaro International Airport** / Eloy Alfaro Air Base	00°56′45″S 80°40′43″W
Salinas	Santa Elena	SESA	SNC	General Ulpiano Paez Airport / Salinas Air Base	02°12′18″S 80°59′20″W
San Cristóbal, Galápagos Islands	Galápagos	SEST	SCY	**San Cristóbal Airport**	00°54′37″S 89°37′03″W
Santa Rosa	El Oro	SERO	ETR	**Santa Rosa Airport**	03°26′07″S 79°58′40″W
Tulcán	Carchi	SETU	TUA	Teniente Coronel Luis A. Mantilla International Airport	00°48′34″S 77°42′29″W
Quito	Pichincha	SEQM	UIO	**Mariscal Sucre International Airport** / Mariscal Sucre Air Base	00°08′28″S 78°29′17″W
**Controlled airports**
Ambato (San Juan de Ambato)	Tungurahua	SEAM	ATF	Chachoan Airport	01°12′45″S 78°34′28″W
Bahía de Caráquez	Manabí	SEBC	BHA	Los Perales Airport	0°36′20″S 80°24′15″W
Coca (Puerto Francisco de Orellana)	Orellana	SECO	OCC	**Francisco de Orellana Airport**	00°27′46″S 76°59′12″W
Gualaquiza	Morona Santiago	SEGZ		Gualaquiza Airport	3°25′25″S 78°34′00″W
Ibarra	Imbabura	SEIB		Atahualpa Airport - closed	0°20′20″N 78°08′10″W
Loja	Loja	SECA	LOH	**Ciudad de Catamayo Airport**	03°59′45″S 79°22′19″W
Macará	Loja	SEMA	MRR	José María Velasco Ibarra Airport	04°22′45″S 79°56′29″W
Macas	Morona Santiago	SEMC	XMS	Edmundo Carvajal Airport	02°17′57″S 78°07′15″W
Machala	El Oro	SEMH	MCH	General Manuel Serrano Airport - closed	03°16′08″S 79°57′41″W
Montalvo	Pastaza	SEMO		El Carmen Airport	2°04′00″S 76°58′35″W
Nueva Loja	Sucumbíos	SENL	LGQ	Lago Agrio Airport	00°05′33″N 76°52′10″W
Portoviejo	Manabí	SEPV	PVO	Reales Tamarindos Airport - closed	01°02′29″S 80°28′19″W
Puerto Villamil	Galápagos	SEII		General Villamil Airport - Open	0°56′40″S 90°57′10″W
Putumayo	Sucumbíos	SEPT	PYO	Putumayo Airport	0°06′55″N 75°51′00″W
Riobamba	Chimborazo	SERB		Chimborazo Airport	1°39′15″S 78°39′25″W
Santa Cecilia	Sucumbíos	SECE	WSE	Santa Cecilia Airport	0°04′15″N 76°59′30″W
Shell	Pastaza	SESM	PTZ	Río Amazonas Airport	1°30′19″S 78°03′46″W
Sucúa	Morona Santiago	SESC	SUQ	Sucúa Airport	2°28′15″S 78°10′10″W
Taisha	Morona Santiago	SETH	TSC	Taisha Airport	2°22′50″S 77°30′10″W
Tarapoa	Sucumbíos	SETR	TPC	Tarapoa Airport	00°07′22″S 76°20′15″W
Taura	Guayas	SETA		Taura Air Base	2°15′40″S 79°40′50″W
Tena	Napo	SEJD	TNW	Jumandy Airport	01°03′35″S 77°35′00″W
Tiputini	Orellana	SETI	TPN	Tiputini Airport	0°46′35″S 75°31′45″W
**Airports with unverified coordinates**
Jipijapa	Manabí	SEJI	JIP	Jipijapa Airport	

== See also ==
- Ecuadorian Air Force (Fuerza Aérea Ecuatoriana)
- Transportation in Ecuador
- List of airports by ICAO code: S#SE - Ecuador
- Wikipedia:WikiProject Aviation/Airline destination lists: South America#Ecuador
