= Avianca Brasil =

Brazilian airline

OceanAir Linhas Aéreas S.A.

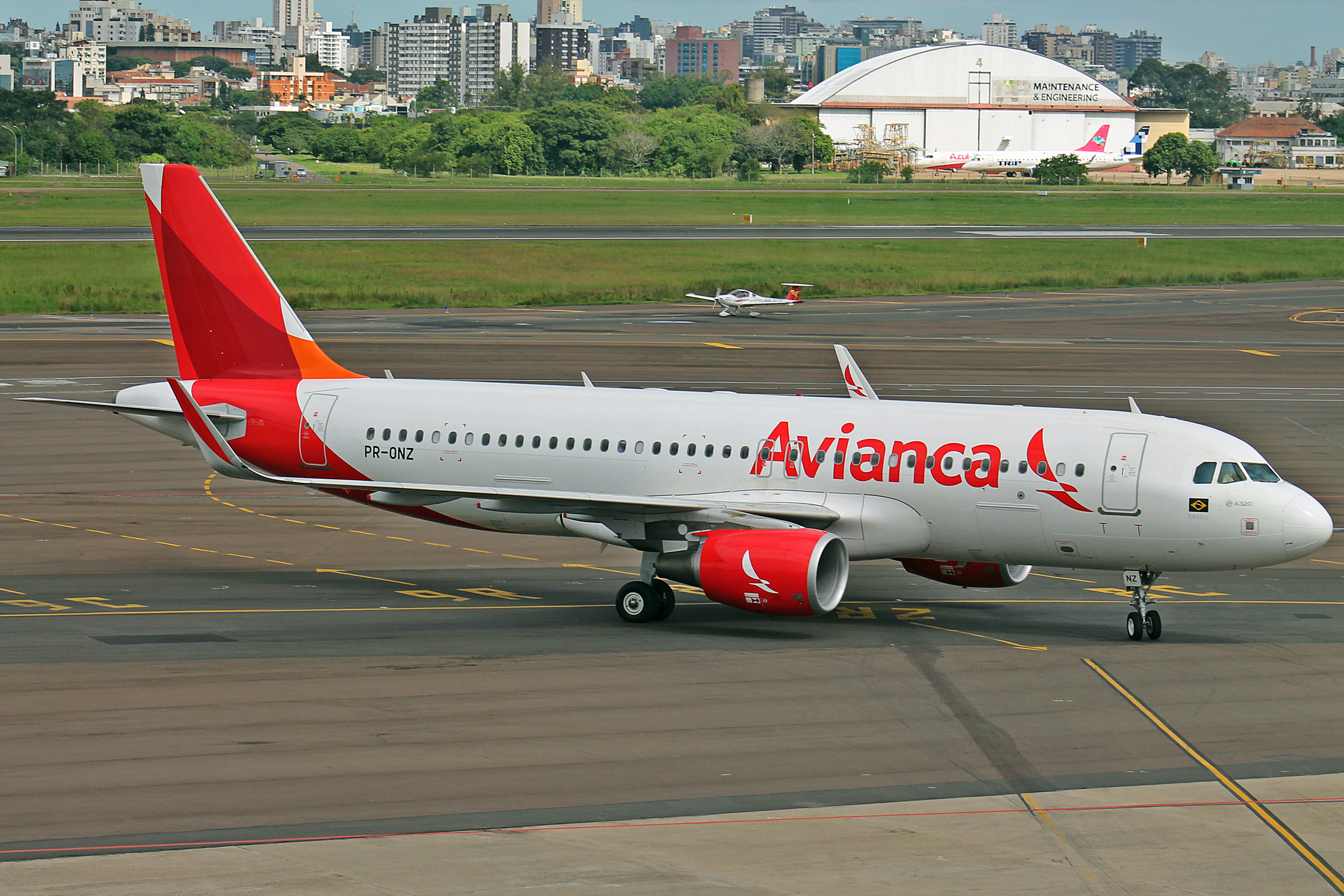
IATA	ICAO	Call sign
O6	ONE	OCEANAIR
- Founded: 30 June 1998; 28 years ago (as OceanAir)
- Ceased operations: 24 May 2019; 7 years ago (suspended); 14 July 2020; 6 years ago (bankrupt)
- Hubs: Rio de Janeiro–Santos Dumont
- Secondary hubs: São Paulo–Congonhas
- Frequent-flyer program: Programa Amigo
- Alliance: Star Alliance (2015-2019; affiliate)
- Fleet size: 6
- Destinations: 4
- Parent company: Synergy Group
- Headquarters: São Paulo, Brazil
- Key people: Frederico Pedreira (President); José Efromovich (CEO)
- Revenue: US$720 million (2019)
- Employees: 1,687 (2019)
- Website: avianca.com.br

Avianca Brasil S.A. (Portuguese: Avianca Brasil), officially Oceanair Linhas Aéreas S/A, was a Brazilian airline based in Congonhas Airport in São Paulo, Brazil. According to the National Civil Aviation Agency of Brazil (ANAC), which cancelled its operation, prior to cessation of operations, from January to December 2018 Avianca Brasil had 13.4% of the domestic and 7.3% of the international market share in terms of passengers per kilometer flown, making it the fourth-largest airline both in domestic and international traffic in Brazil. The company slots (landings and take-off permits) were redistributed by Anac. An auction on 10 July 2019 raised R$555.3 million, not enough to pay a debt of R$2.7 billion, although Avianca's bankruptcy was not officially decreed.

== History ==
=== OceanAir ===
The airline was established on 30 June 1998 as an air taxi company to operate services for oil companies in the Campos Basin. Its name was then OceanAir and began to operate scheduled services in 2002, between São Paulo, Rio de Janeiro, Macaé and Campos. Soon afterwards, it became better known to the public with a scheduled flight (no longer operated) connecting São Paulo–Congonhas Airport in São Paulo and Santos Dumont Airport in Rio de Janeiro via São Paulo–Guarulhos International Airport, enabling international passengers from both cities easy access to the country's largest international hub from those cities' more convenient central airports. At the time, OceanAir's fare between São Paulo's airports was cheaper than a taxi and on par with a luxury bus ride.

In 2004, Synergy Group, the owner of the airline, bought the Colombian airline Avianca, which was undergoing judicial reorganization. As a result, OceanAir became a feeder for Avianca's flights into Guarulhos. This partnership between the two airlines increased the flow of passengers between Colombia and Brazil. Synergy Group also bought VIP as part of a strategy to create a continent-wide airline under the Avianca brand. In November 2005, a joint venture formed by OceanAir (49%) and Fondo de Inversiones Sustentables (51%) created a new Peruvian airline called Wayraperú, but the airline suspended operations a few months later until it was re-established later in 2018.

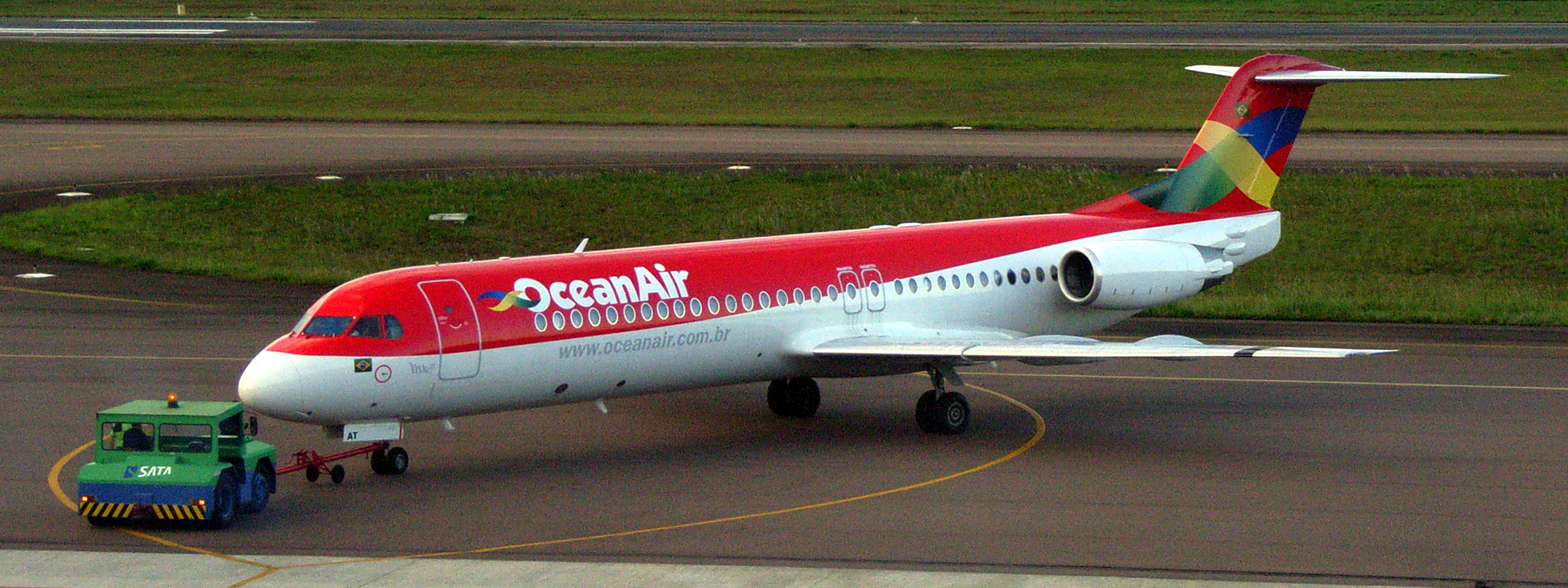
A Fokker 100 taxiing at Afonso Pena International Airport in 2007

OceanAir started operating international flights in 2007 with three Boeing 767-300ERs and a Boeing 757-200, but by April 2008, the flights were discontinued because of an increase in operating costs. Since then, the airline has concentrated its efforts on the Brazilian domestic market only. 5 Airbus A330s and 30 Airbus A320s were ordered in 2010, a contract worth US$ 2,5 billion. With this fleet growth, Efromovich intended to control 15% of the Brazilian air market in the next decade, including routes to Mexico, Colombia, Africa, and the United States.

=== Avianca Brasil ===
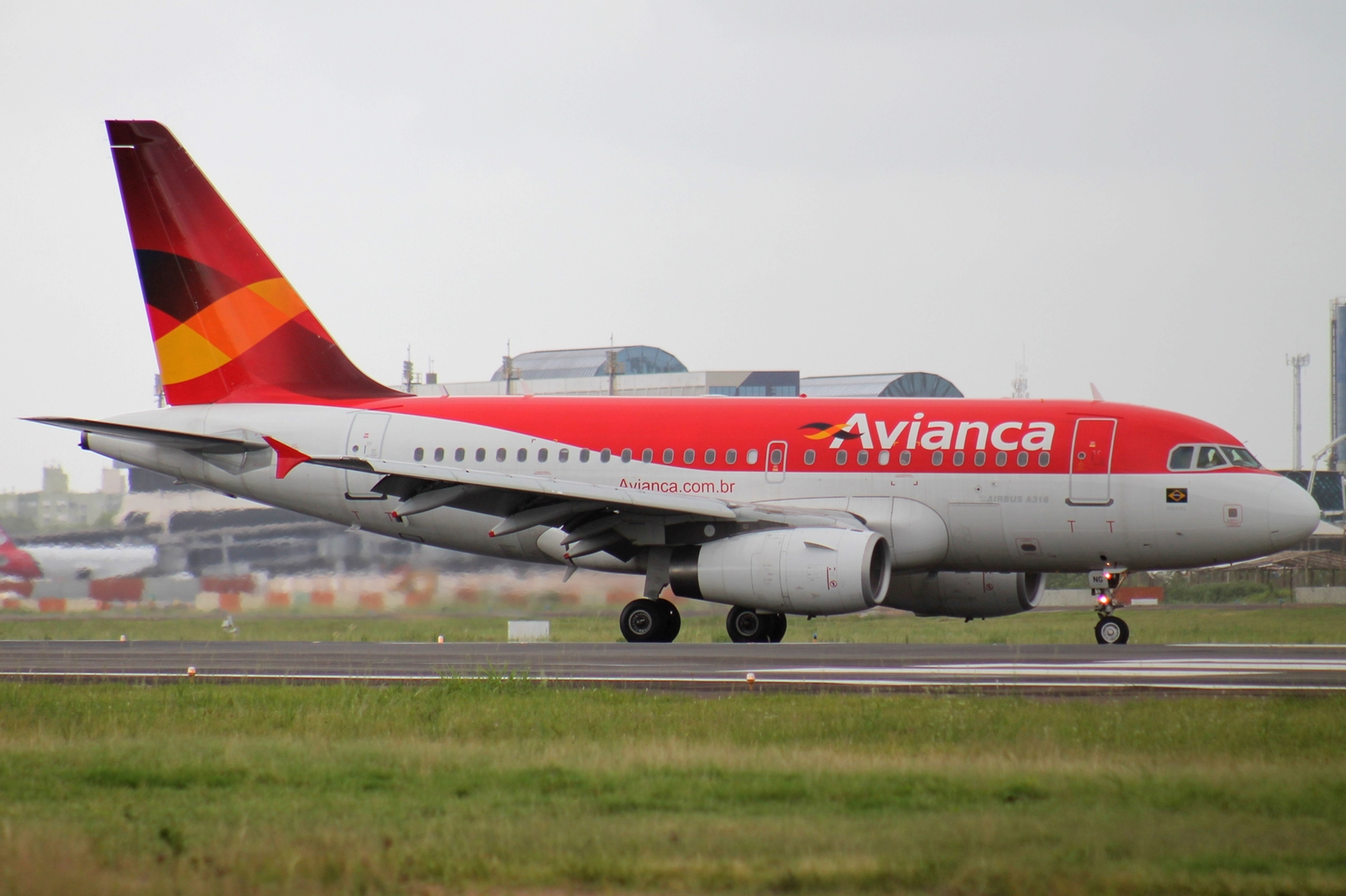
An Airbus A318-100 at Salgado Filho Porto Alegre International Airport in 2012

On 9 October 2009, Synergy announced that TACA Airlines and Avianca would merge. This merger increased OceanAir's feeder operations, already implemented with Avianca in São Paulo, to include TACA in São Paulo, Rio de Janeiro–Galeão International Airport, Santos Dumont Airport, Salgado Filho International Airport in Porto Alegre and Presidente Juscelino Kubitschek International Airport in Brasília.

On 26 March 2010, Germán Efromovich announced the rebranding of OceanAir as Avianca Brasil. However, OceanAir Linhas Aéreas remained as the legal name of the airline. This allowed the Synergy group to further align the operations of OceanAir and Avianca. The first aircraft with the new name started operations on 27 April 2010. The only notable differences between the aircraft of Avianca Colombia and those of Avianca Brasil are the latter's Brazilian registrations and a small Brazilian flag under their cockpit windows.

On 10 November 2010, Star Alliance decided to accept AviancaTaca Holding to join the network as a member airline. However, Avianca Brasil was rejected at the time due to its outdated IT platforms and an objection by TAM Linhas Aéreas, which since left Star Alliance to join Oneworld after merging with LAN Airlines. Upon TAM's exit, Avianca Brasil officially joined Star Alliance on 22 July 2015 as an affiliate.

On 11 October 2016, the airline took delivery of the first of 8 Airbus A320neos being leased from GECAS. Independent from Avianca, the airline increased its market share from 3% in 2009 to 14% in 2018, becoming Brazil's fourth-largest carrier.

==== Bankruptcy ====
On 10 December 2018, Avianca Brasil filed for bankruptcy protection, R$ 100 million (US$26 million) was owed to airports and bank debt grew by 50% in 2018, while United Airlines extended a loan of US$456 million to Avianca owner Synergy Group. Total debts amount to 493 million reais (US$127 million), whereas the first half of 2018 generated 175.6 million reais of losses. On 18 April 2019 Azul cancelled its offer to buy Avianca Brasil, but resubmitted the offer on 13 May. On 24 May 2019, ANAC suspended flights of Avianca Brasil, due to security reasons. On 24 June 2019, its suspension was officially written in the official Diary by Anac. On 10 July 2019, the auction generated US$147,32 million or R$555,3 million from Gol Linhas Aéreas Inteligentes and LATAM Brasil, if valid, however the debts are R$2.7 billion.

On 20 August 2019, Star Alliance announced Avianca Brasil's exit from the alliance from 1 September 2019. The departure, however, didn't affect Avianca's membership.

On 14 July 2020, Avianca Brasil filed for bankruptcy in court.

== Corporate affairs ==
Even though the legal name of the airline remained as OceanAir, it was re-branded as Avianca since it was owned by Synergy Group, which owns Avianca Holdings. The original Avianca of Colombia and Avianca Brasil remained separate legal entities, but in February 2017, it was reported that Avianca Holdings planned to obtain the necessary regulatory approvals to fold Avianca Brasil into Avianca Holdings. Its current CEO, Frederico Pedreira, took office in April 2016. José Efromovich, younger brother of Germán Efromovich, President of Avianca Holdings, who had led the company since 2008, took office as chairman of the Board of Directors on the same date.

== Destinations ==
Avianca Brasil operated the following flights at the time of its suspension of operations in May 2019.

The list includes destinations operated under the former name OceanAir.

Country	City	Airport	Notes	Refs
Brazil	Alta Floresta	Alta Floresta Airport	Terminated	
Brazil	Aracaju	Santa Maria Airport	Terminated	
Brazil	Belém	Belém/Val-de-Cans International Airport	Terminated	
Brazil	Belo Horizonte	Belo Horizonte International Airport	Terminated	
Brazil	Brasília	Brasília International Airport		
Brazil	Campo Grande	Campo Grande International Airport	Terminated	
Brazil	Chapecó	Chapecó Airport	Terminated	
Brazil	Cuiabá	Marechal Rondon International Airport	Terminated	
Brazil	Curitiba	Afonso Pena International Airport	Terminated	
Brazil	Florianópolis	Hercílio Luz International Airport	Terminated	
Brazil	Fortaleza	Fortaleza Airport	Terminated	
Brazil	Foz do Iguaçu	Foz do Iguaçu International Airport	Terminated	
Brazil	Goiânia	Goiânia International Airport	Terminated	
Brazil	Ilhéus	Ilhéus Jorge Amado Airport	Terminated	
Brazil	Ji-Paraná	José Coleto Airport	Terminated	
Brazil	João Pessoa	Presidente Castro Pinto International Airport	Terminated	
Brazil	Juazeiro do Norte	Juazeiro do Norte Airport	Terminated	
Brazil	Maceió	Zumbi dos Palmares International Airport	Terminated	
Brazil	Manaus	Eduardo Gomes International Airport	Terminated	
Brazil	Natal	Augusto Severo International Airport	Airport closed	
Brazil	Natal	Greater Natal International Airport	Terminated	
Brazil	Navegantes	Navegantes Airport	Terminated	
Brazil	Passo Fundo	Lauro Kurtz Airport	Terminated	
Brazil	Petrolina	Petrolina Airport	Terminated	
Brazil	Porto Alegre	Salgado Filho Porto Alegre International Airport	Terminated	
Brazil	Porto Velho	Governador Jorge Teixeira de Oliveira International Airport	Terminated	
Brazil	Recife	Recife/Guararapes–Gilberto Freyre International Airport	Terminated	
Brazil	Rio de Janeiro	Rio de Janeiro/Galeão International Airport	Terminated	
Brazil	Rio de Janeiro	Santos Dumont Airport	Hub	
Brazil	Salvador de Bahia	Salvador Bahia Airport		
Brazil	São Paulo	São Paulo–Congonhas Airport	Hub	
Brazil	São Paulo	São Paulo/Guarulhos International Airport	Terminated	
Brazil	Vitória	Eurico de Aguiar Salles Airport	Terminated	
Chile	Santiago	Arturo Merino Benítez International Airport	Terminated	
Colombia	Bogotá	El Dorado International Airport	Terminated	
Mexico	Cancún	Cancún International Airport	Terminated	
Mexico	Mexico City	Mexico City International Airport	Terminated	
Peru	Lima	Jorge Chávez International Airport	Terminated	
United States	Miami	Miami International Airport	Terminated	
United States	New York City	John F. Kennedy International Airport	Terminated	

=== Former codeshare agreements ===
Before the airline suspends its operations in May 2019, Avianca Brasil had codeshare agreements with the following airlines:

- Aeroméxico
- Air Canada
- Air Europa
- Alitalia
- Avianca
- Avianca El Salvador
- Ethiopian Airlines
- Etihad Airways
- South African Airways
- Turkish Airlines
- United Airlines

== Fleet ==
Avianca Brasil had formerly operated the following aircraft:

Retired Avianca Brasil fleet
Aircraft	Total	Introduced	Retired	Notes
Airbus A319-100	4	2010	2019	
Airbus A318-100	15	2011	2019	
Airbus A320-200	29	2011	2019	
Airbus A320neo	12	2016	2019	Returned to owners due to default. All later went to Azul Brazilian Airlines.
Airbus A330-200	6	2014	2019	
Airbus A330-200F	1	2014	2019	Transferred to Avianca Cargo
Beechcraft C90	1	Unknown	Unknown	
Boeing 737-300	3	2007	2009	
Boeing 757-200	1	2007	2008	
Boeing 767-300ER	3	2007	2008	
Embraer EMB 120 Brasilia	7	2002	2008	
Fokker 50	5	2003	2008	2 leased from Avianca.
Fokker 100	16	2005	2015	
Learjet 35A	1	1998	2004	
Learjet 45	1	2004	2019	
Learjet 55C	1	1999	2010	

== Accidents and incidents ==
- On August 12, 2010, a Learjet 55C (registered PT-LXO) was damaged in a runway excursion accident at Santos Dumont Airport. The aircraft ran off the end of runway 02R into the Guanabara Bay. The three occupants on board were not injured.
- On March 28, 2014, a Fokker 100 (registered PR-OAF) crashed while landing at Brasília International Airport after the nose landing gear could not be extended due to a hydraulic failure. No one was harmed in the incident. The aircraft was damaged beyond repair and was written off. It was later preserved as a Pan Am-themed restaurant at Brasília in August 2020.
- On March 3, 2019, an Airbus A320-200 (registered PR-OCW) suffered a minor runway excursion on landing in heavy rainfall on runway 15 of Rio de Janeiro/Galeão International Airport.

== See also ==
- List of defunct airlines of Brazil
