= SAETA =

Ecuadorian airline

IATA	ICAO	Call sign
EH	SET	SAETA
- Founded: 1966
- Ceased operations: February 2000
- Hubs: Old Mariscal Sucre International Airport
- Secondary hubs: José Joaquín de Olmedo International Airport
- Frequent-flyer program: ADDmiles
- Subsidiaries: SAN Ecuador
- Fleet size: 7
- Destinations: 19
- Headquarters: Quito, Ecuador

SAETA Air Ecuador (legally Sociedad Anónima Ecuatoriana de Transportes Aéreos S.A.) was a privately held airline of Ecuador, which was founded in 1966. During its heyday in the 1990s, it flew to numerous destinations in North and South America from its base in Guayaquil.

== Fleet ==
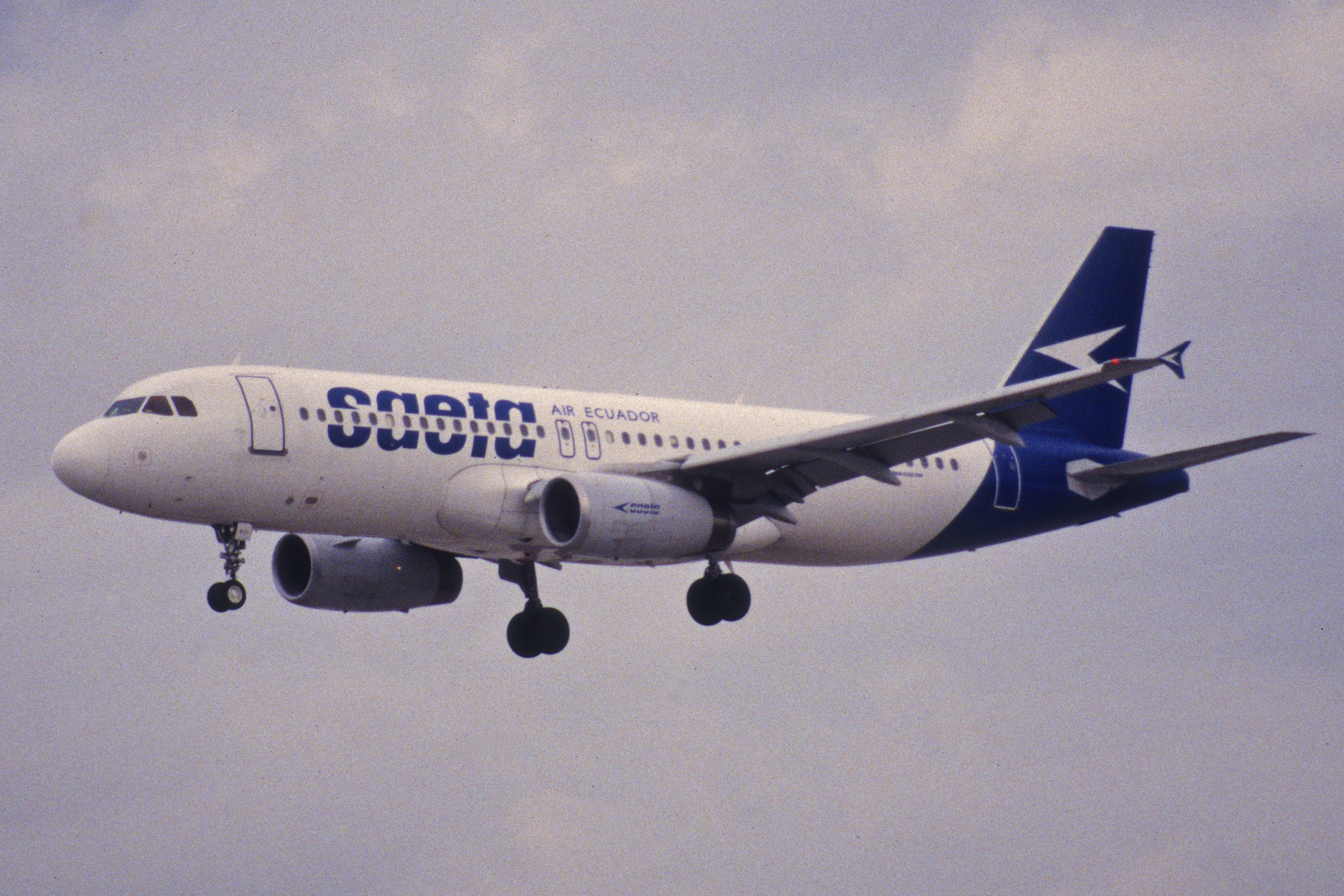
An Airbus A320-200 landing at Miami International Airport in 1998

SAETA had operated the following aircraft since it commenced operations:

SAETA fleet
Aircraft	Total	Introduced	Retired	Notes
Airbus A310-300	2	1992	1996	
Airbus A320-200	4	1994	1999	
Boeing 707-320C	1	1985	1993	
Boeing 727-100	2	1981	2000	
Boeing 727-200	3	1991	2000	
Boeing 737-200	1	1994	1995	
Boeing 737-300	2	1994	2000	
Douglas C-47 Skytrain	3	1967	1976	
Sud Aviation Caravelle	4	1975	1986	
Vickers Viscount 700	4	1969	1980	

== Accidents and incidents ==
- On July 3, 1969, a Douglas C-47 was hijacked on a domestic flight from Tulcán Airport to Mariscal Sucre International Airport. The hijackers demanded to be taken to Cuba.
- On October 20, 1971, a Vickers Viscount was hijacked by six people. It landed at Mariscal Lamar International Airport.
- On August 15, 1976, SAETA Flight 232, a Vickers Viscount (registered HC-ARS) crashed into the Chimborazo volcano, killing all 59 people on board. The flight was considered missing until February 2003, after an independent verification of aircraft wreckage that was discovered in October 2002.
- On April 23, 1979, a Vickers Viscount (registered HC-AVP) crashed in the Pastaza Province on a flight between the Quito and Cuenca, killing all 57 people on board. The flight was considered missing until 1984, when the wreckage was discovered. The aircraft was 25 nautical miles (46 km) off track.
- On January 18, 1986, a Sud Aviation Caravelle (registered HC-BAE), operated by Aerovías, crashed in a jungle area after executing a second missed approach procedure at Flores International Airport. Low lying clouds in the area forced the crew to carry out the missed approaches. All 88 passengers and 6 crew members died in the accident.
- On August 22, 1997, a Boeing 727-200 (registered HC-BVU) was landing at San Cristóbal Airport when its undercarriage struck the raised lip of the runway, causing it to collapse. It slid for about 700 m before coming to rest on the right side of the runway.

== See also ==
- List of defunct airlines of Ecuador
