= TPN =

TPN may refer to:

== Science and Medicine ==
- Total parenteral nutrition
- Triphosphopyridine nucleotide, the previous name for nicotinamide adenine dinucleotide phosphate (NADP^{+})
- Task Positive Network, see Dorsal attention network

== Organisations ==
- Society of Friends of Science in Warsaw (Towarzystwo Przyjaciół Nauk) in Warsaw
- Tatra National Park, Poland (Tatrzański Park Narodowy)

== Other ==
- Third-party note or Note verbale, a diplomatic document
- Tupinambá language, by ISO 639 code
- Tiputini Airport, Ecuador
- Treaty on the Prohibition of Nuclear Weapons
- The Promised Neverland (manga/anime series)
