= Galapagos Airport =

Galapagos Airport may refer to:

- Seymour Airport, Baltra, Galápagos Islands, Ecuador
- San Cristóbal Airport, San Cristóbal, Galápagos Islands, Ecuador
