= Atahualpa Airport =

- IATA: none; ICAO: SEIB

Summary
- Airport type: Closed
- Serves: Ibarra
- Elevation AMSL: 2,640 ft / 805 m
- Coordinates: 0°20′20″N 78°08′10″W

Map
- Location of the airport in Ecuador

Runways
| Direction | Length | | Surface |
| Direction | m | ft | Surface |
|---|---|---|---|
Closed
- Sources: Google Maps

Atahualpa Airport (ICAO: SEIB) was an airport formerly serving the town of Ibarra in Imbabura Province, Ecuador.

The Google Earth Historical Image for 6/7/2011 shows a 1,950 metres (6,400 ft) north/south asphalt runway. The 9/1/2015 image shows the runway gone and the land under commercial and residential development. The Control tower still exist today and can be seen on the Vìctor gomez jurado-Troncal de la Sierra Crossroad

== See also ==
- List of airports in Ecuador
- Transport in Ecuador
