= Tiputini Airport =

- IATA: TPN; ICAO: SETI

Summary
- Airport type: Public
- Serves: Tiputini
- Elevation AMSL: 997 ft / 304 m
- Coordinates: 0°46′35″S 75°31′45″W

Map
- Location of the airport in Ecuador

Runways
Direction	Length		Surface
Direction	m	ft	Surface
09/27	1,100	3,609	Grass
- Sources: GCM Google Maps

Tiputini Airport (IATA: TPN, ICAO: SETI) is an airport serving the Napo River village of Tiputini in Orellana Province, Ecuador.

The Tiputini non-directional beacon (ident: TPU) is on the field.

== See also ==
- List of airports in Ecuador
- Transport in Ecuador
