= José Efromovich =

Brazilian businessman

José Efromovich (born 1955 in La Paz, Bolivia) is a Brazilian businessman of Polish-Jewish descent. He was CEO of the Brazilian airline Avianca Brazil and has a seat in the supervisory board of the AviancaTaca Holding company. His brother is Germán Efromovich, the owner of AviancaTaca. The Efromovich family created the Synergy Group in 2003, an industrial conglomerate in Brazil operating in various business segments. The multinational he heads with his brother has capital invested in companies in the aeronautical, energy, oil, and shipping sectors in several Latin American countries.
