= Synergy Group =

Brazilian-headquartered conglomerate

Synergy Group Corp.
- Company type: Corporation
- Industry: Conglomerate
- Founded: 2003
- Headquarters: São Paulo, Brazil
- Key people: José Efromovich (Chairman); Germán Efromovich (CEO)
- Products: Airline industry, aerospace, Oil & Gas, shipyard
- Revenue: ▲US$ 10.0 billion (2011)
- Number of employees: 40,000 (2013)
- Subsidiaries: AEQ Aeroespacial; Digex Aircraft Maintenance; EAE Aerospace Solutions; EISA Shipping Agency; REM; Senior Taxi Aéreo; Synergy Aerospace; Synergy Europe; Synerjet Brasil
- Website: www.synergygroupcorp.com

Synergy Group Corp. is a South American conglomerate created and owned by Germán Efromovich. The group is headquartered in Rio de Janeiro, Brazil. It operates several airlines in South America, among which are Avianca Group (formerly Avianca Holdings & AviancaTaca Holding), with a 66.66% stake, and is active in the exploration of oil and natural gas throughout the region. Additionally, it operates hydroelectric power plants, participates in the construction of telecommunications infrastructure, shipbuilding and technical inspections, radiochemistry, radiopharmaceuticals, agriculture and hospitality.

Synergy Group had integrated the airlines and companies of TACA Airlines with Avianca under a holding company, Avianca Holdings. The Synergy Group owns 66.66% of the newly created subsidiary company. Kingsland Holding (El Salvador) owns the other 33.33% of Avianca-TACA.

Synergy Aerospace Corp. a sub-division of Synergy Group, is headquartered in Bogotá, Colombia. It is the major shareholder of Avianca Holdings. The company controls eight airlines in four countries: Avianca and Tampa Cargo in Colombia, Avianca Brasil, VarigLog and Synerjet in Brazil, VIP and AeroGal in Ecuador and Grupo TACA in El Salvador. In November 2012, Synergy Aerospace Corp. established Synergy Aerospace Europe.

Synergy Aerospace established a joint venture in March 2011, with Israel Aerospace Industries. Brazil-based company EAE Aerospace Solutions was established to become the shareholder and holding company of the group’s activities in Brazil. Synergy wants to invest in Flight Technologies, a manufacturer of tactical UAVs for the Brazilian Army, based in São José dos Campos. The joint venture will offer advanced defense systems, such as unmanned aerial vehicles, Multi Mission Transporters, mission and fighter aircraft upgrades, intelligence surveillance and reconnaissance advanced systems and radars.

The Synergy Group also has relevant activities, including the control of the EISA Shipping Agency, currently building a 500-ton patrol ship for the Brazilian Navy, and the Brazilian Digex company, operating in aircraft maintenance area.

Synergy Aerospace was a candidate in the acquisition of Portuguese state carrier TAP Portugal. In November 2012, Synergy Group created Synergy Europe based in Luxembourg, to deal with the possible takeover of the Portuguese airline. All European activities would be handled by its European subsidiary. Through this unit, the company was planning to partner with European investors, including Portuguese airline EuroAtlantic Airways. In June 2015, Synergy lost the bid to the Gateway consortium, that includes Portuguese bus owner Humberto Pedrosa and Brazilian David Neeleman (Azul Brazilian Airlines).

== Subsidiaries ==
- AEQ Aeroespacial
- Digex Aircraft Maintenance S.A.
- EAE Aerospace Solutions
- EISA Shipping Agency
- REM
- Senior Taxi Aéreo
- Synergy Aerospace
- Synergy Europe
- Synerjet Brasil

== See also ==
- List of Firms with IATA coded air carrier business holdings or subsidiaries in South America
