= Reales Tamarindos Airport =

- IATA: PVO; ICAO: SEPV

Summary
- Airport type: Closed
- Serves: Portoviejo, Ecuador
- Elevation AMSL: 130 ft / 40 m
- Coordinates: 01°02′29″S 80°28′19″W

Map
- Location of the airport in Ecuador

Runways
Direction	Length		Surface
Direction	ft	m	Surface
Closed
- Source: GCM Google Maps

Reales Tamarindos Airport (Spanish: Aeropuerto Reales Tamarindos) (IATA: PVO, ICAO: SEPV) is a closed airport formerly serving Portoviejo, the capital of Manabí Province in Ecuador.

The nearest major airport to Portoviejo is Eloy Alfaro International Airport in Manta, 26 kilometres (16 mi) to the west.

Following the April 2016 earthquake, a tent settlement was set up on the closed runway to provide shelter for displaced households.

== See also ==
- Transport in Ecuador
- List of airports in Ecuador
