= Germán Efromovich =

Bolivian-born entrepreneur (born 1950)

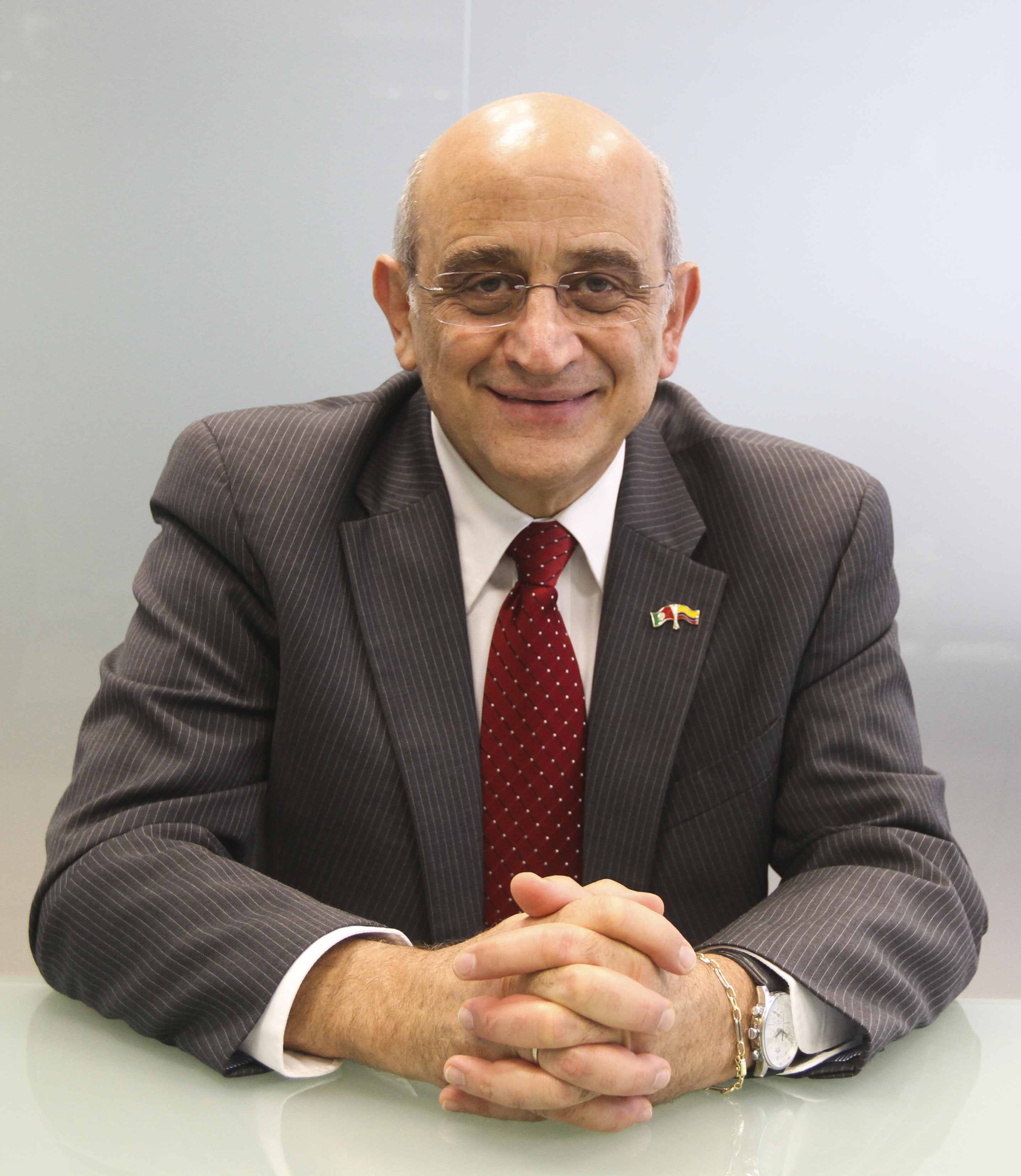
- Germán Efromovich in 2012
- Born: 1950 (age 75–76); La Paz, Bolivia
- Citizenship: Brazilian; Colombian; Polish

Germán Efromovich (born 1950) is a Bolivian-born entrepreneur with multiple citizenship: Brazilian, Colombian, and Polish. He was born into a family of Polish Jews. His net worth is estimated to be $1 billion.

== Biography ==
Efromovich was born in La Paz, but his family is originally from Poland. Looking for a new home after World War II, his parents left Poland for South America, first to Bolivia, where he was born, and later to Chile, where Germán Efromovich was raised from 1955 in Arica and then from 1964 in São Paulo, Brazil. After schooling, he earned a degree in Mechanical Engineering from FEI University in Brazil. His career includes selling encyclopedias, dubbing Mexican movies into Portuguese and the ownership of a school in São Bernardo do Campo, where in the 1980s he taught a union leader named Luiz Inácio Lula da Silva, who later became President of Brazil.

The oil sector laid the groundwork for what would become Synergy Group. To build his oil and aviation empire Efromovich bought Avianca, Colombia's national airline, in 2004, for US$64m, plus the assumption of US$220 million in debt and leasing liabilities. Initially performing only nondestructive testing for the Brazilian-government-run oil company, Petrobras, Efromovich developed more business to the point of building and leasing oil rigs. His other businesses include power plants, shipyards and products for the medical industry.

After the sinking of one of these oil rigs in the South Atlantic, off the Brazilian coast, legal disputes with insurance companies and with Petrobras, Germán Efromovich began investing in aviation. This was by pure chance, because a customer, who could not pay cash in a business deal, gave him two of his aircraft. This was the beginning of an air taxi company. The Efromovich brothers called it OceanAir and started to transport staff between the oil exploration site in Macaé and Rio de Janeiro. OceanAir, 2010 renamed Avianca Brazil, was launched in 1998 and six years later he purchased the Colombian legacy airline Avianca from Julio Mario Santo Domingo. As a result of his major investments in Colombia's economic and social development, Efromovich was officially made an honorary Colombian citizen in 2005 by the Colombian government.

He has control or shares in his own Synergy Group, based in Rio de Janeiro, which in 1998 was offering maintenance services for oil operations in Brazil. In late 2004, Efromovich's company agreed to buy a controlling stake in Avianca, which at the time was under the protection of Chapter 11 bankruptcy proceedings. Synergy Group subsequently acquired the remainder of Avianca in 2005.

In February 2010, Avianca and TACA merged to AviancaTaca. The TACA Group encompassed TACA Airlines and their participation in Lacsa, Aviateca, Sansa Airlines, La Costeña, Aeroperlas and Isleña Airlines. Avianca includes: Avianca, Tampa Cargo and the recently incorporated AeroGal from Ecuador. The combined Avianca and Taca is now the second-largest airline in the region in terms of revenue, behind Chilean-Brazilian's LATAM Airlines Group. All these airlines are controlled by Synergy Aerospace Corp. based in Bogotá, a subsidiarity of Synergy Group.

Efromovich also has shares in Wayraperú, Avianca Ecuador and OceanAir, which was later renamed Avianca Brasil.

On November 5, 2017, the Paradise Papers, a set of confidential electronic documents relating to offshore investment, revealed that Efromovich and Synergy Group's subsidiary Avianca Holdings were linked to an offshore conglomerate used for the aerocommercial holding business with ramifications in Bermuda, Panama and Cyprus. Efromovich used a Panamanian offshore that hid more than 20 firms located in tax havens.

On August 19, 2020, Efromovich and his brother José were arrested in São Paulo as a part of Operation Car Wash, and as a result of their involvement in a corruption scheme that involved paying bribes of about R$40 million between 2009 and 2013 to Petrobras and Transpetro high executives so as to win bids to build Panamax ships for the company in the Efremovichs' Estaleiro Ilha (Eisa) shipyard. Both arrests were preemptive, and the brothers were put under house arrest in the face of the COVID-19 pandemic. Efromovich has insisted on his innocence. A Brazilian tribunal considered that the accusations are proper, and decided to start a trial in September 2020.

The arrest order on both brothers was lifted on November 11, 2020, in response to a habeas corpus claim by their defense, although the injunction and preemptive measures are being held in place, which forbids them from leaving the country, changing their residence without informing the authorities, moving any banking account outside the country, or making any management or financial decision in the companies they are stockholders of. They also must surrender their passports, informing the judge of their current addresses and committing to attend all appointments and hearings to which they are summoned as part of the process being advanced on them.

Efromovich is the president of a 2022 Italian start-up airline, AeroItalia.

== Family ==
Germán Efromovich is married to Hilda and they have three daughters. His life is spent shuttling between São Paulo and Bogotá. He has a brother named José Efromovich, five years younger, who was the chairman of Avianca Brazil.
