= SAN Ecuador Flight 832 =

1983 aviation accident in Ecuador

- The aircraft involved in the accident, pictured in 1967 while still operating for TAP Air Portugal

Accident
- Date: 29 April 1983
- Summary: Engine failure during takeoff
- Site: José Joaquín de Olmedo International Airport, Guayaquil, Ecuador

Aircraft
- Aircraft type: Sud Aviation Caravelle
- Aircraft name: La Pinta
- Operator: SAN Ecuador
- Registration: HC-BAT
- Flight origin: José Joaquín de Olmedo International Airport, Guayaquil, Ecuador
- Destination: Old Mariscal Sucre International Airport, Quito, Ecuador
- Occupants: 100
- Passengers: 94
- Crew: 6
- Fatalities: 8
- Injuries: 20
- Survivors: 92

SAN Ecuador Flight 832 was a domestic flight in Ecuador from Guayaquil to Quito. On 29 April 1983, the Sud Caravelle performed an emergency landing shortly after takeoff due to double-engine failure, killing 8 of the 100 on board.

== Accident ==
The previous day of the accident, during a test flight, the captain had reported that the No.1 engine produced insufficient power. He was then told that the engine was fixed. The next day, just after takeoff from Runway 21, one of the engines failed and the other one weakened. Seeking a place to land, the crew found a gap at Santay Island, but then decided to return to the runway. Losing altitude, the plane crashed into a swampy area short of runway threshold. The impact broke the aircraft in half and ripped the seats. The flight engineer and seven passengers died, twenty were injured.

== Cause ==
The cause for the engine failure were undetermined.
