= SAETA Flight 011 (1979) =

1979 aviation accident

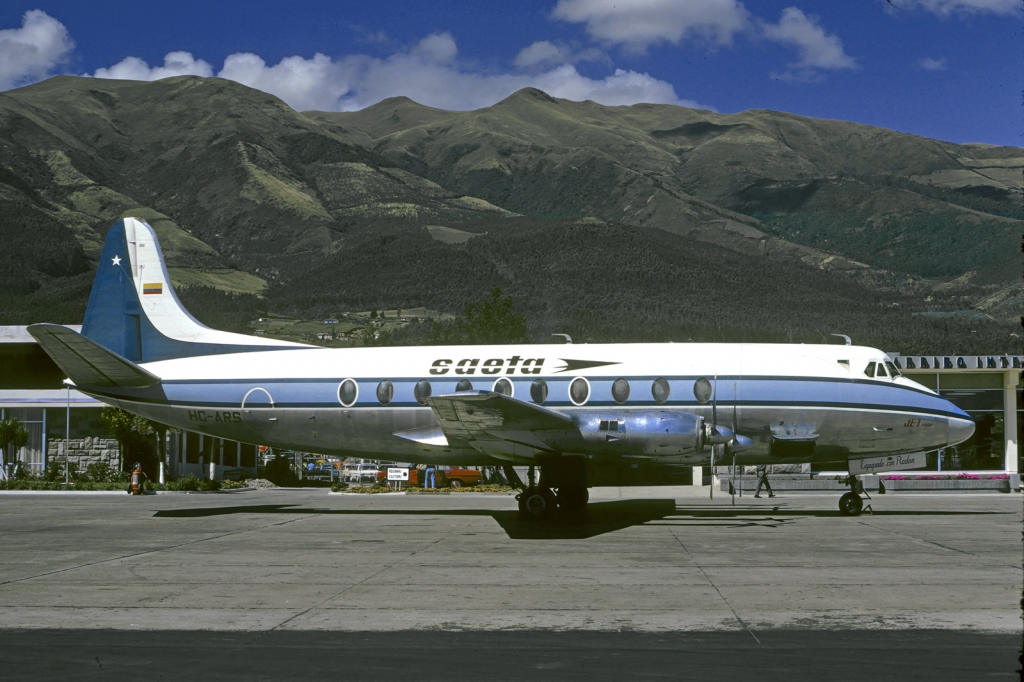
- A Vickers Viscount, similar to the aircraft involved in the accident. This aircraft crashed in 1976

Accident
- Date: 23 April 1979
- Summary: Cause unknown; possible controlled flight into terrain
- Site: Pastaza Province, Ecuador

Aircraft
- Aircraft type: Vickers 785D Viscount
- Operator: SAETA
- IATA flight No.: EH011
- ICAO flight No.: SET011
- Call sign: SAETA 011
- Registration: HC-AVP
- Flight origin: Quito-Mariscal Sucre Airport, Ecuador
- Destination: Cuenca Airport, Ecuador
- Occupants: 57
- Passengers: 52
- Crew: 5
- Fatalities: 57
- Survivors: 0

On 23 April 1979, SAETA Flight 011, a Vickers Viscount passenger aircraft of Ecuadorian airline SAETA, crashed in a mountainous region of Pastaza Province, Ecuador, killing all 57 people on board. The wreckage of the aircraft was not found until five years later.

== Accident ==
Flight 011 departed at 7.08 am on 23 April from Quito-Mariscal Sucre Airport, Ecuador, on a domestic flight to Cuenca Airport. The plane was cruising in cloud at an altitude of 18,000 ft (5,486 m) and was expected to arrive in Cuenca at 8 am. However, the plane disappeared from radar screens and never arrived at its destination. Search and rescue operations were quickly started, but eventually abandoned after several days without finding any trace of the plane or its occupants.

== Aircraft ==
The Vickers 785D Viscount involved, HC-AVP (msn 329) was built in 1957 and was used by SAETA from May, 1971 until its destruction in 1979.

== Aftermath ==
The mystery of the aircraft's disappearance gave birth to a theory published in The New York Times in November 1979, stating that the plane had been hijacked and flown to Colombia to participate in the drug smuggling to the United States. In March 1983, a judicial court in Quito declared the presumed death of all the occupants of the plane.

The plane wreckage was eventually discovered on a mountain slope at a height of 5500 meters (18045 feet) in the region of Shell-Mera, Pastaza Province, in 1984. The aircraft was destroyed in the accident, killing all 57 people on board. The aircraft had deviated 46 km (29 miles) from its intended course to Cuenca. However, the cause of this deviation remains unknown. The cause of the accident was never determined.
