= SAETA Flight 011 (1976) =

1976 fatal aviation accident in Ecuador

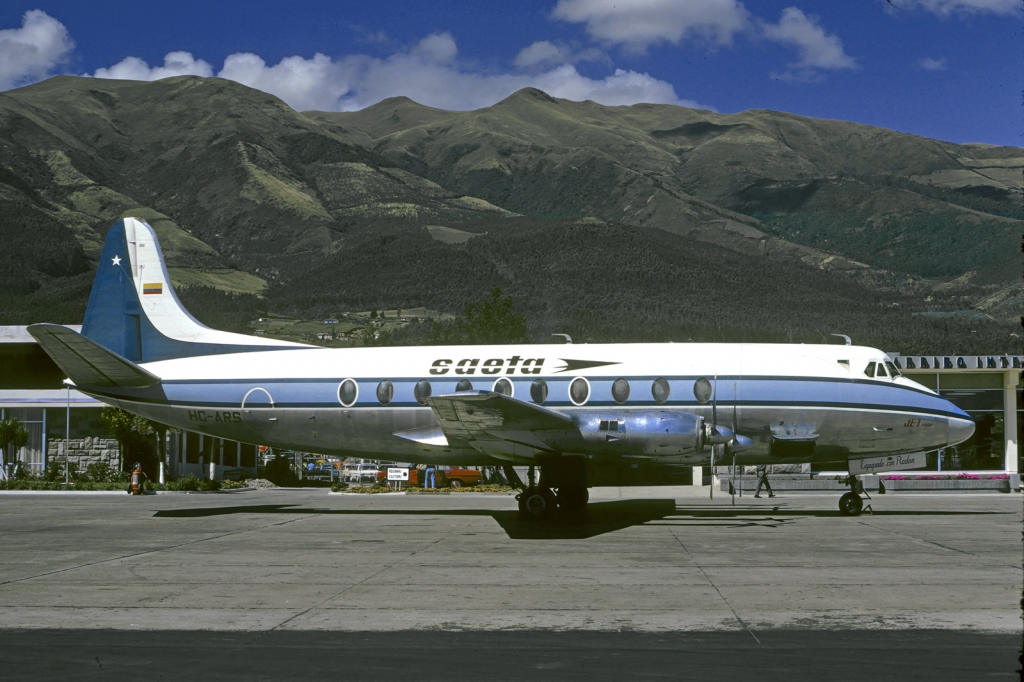
- HC-ARS, the aircraft involved in the accident, pictured in 1975

Accident
- Date: 15 August 1976
- Summary: CFIT into mountain for unknown reasons
- Site: Chimborazo volcano, Chimborazo Province, Ecuador

Aircraft
- Aircraft type: Vickers Viscount 785D
- Operator: SAETA
- Registration: HC-ARS
- Flight origin: Mariscal Sucre International Airport, Quito, Ecuador
- Destination: Mariscal Lamar Airport, Cuenca, Ecuador
- Occupants: 59
- Passengers: 55
- Crew: 4
- Fatalities: 59
- Survivors: 0

SAETA Flight 011 was a scheduled passenger flight operated by SAETA Air Ecuador between Quito and Cuenca, using a Vickers Viscount 785D aircraft. On 15 August 1976, the flight was reported missing near the Chimborazo stratovolcano while carrying 55 passengers and four crew members. Searches for the plane would be carried out for 26 years, until the wreckage of the aircraft was officially located in February 2003.

The pilot's last contact with the control tower took place over the city of Ambato. As a result of the remote location of the accident site, the wreckage was hidden below the glacier of Chimborazo, making location of the plane prohibitively difficult. The place of impact was declared a graveyard, and the remains were not recovered. This led to intense speculation over the cause of the disappearance, including rumors of a potential hijacking, as well as some controversy when the wreckage was located.

The plane was eventually found at 5,310 meters (17,420 feet) by two members of the Nuevos Horizontes mountaineering club, Pablo Chiquiza and Flavio Armas, while exploring a new hiking route to the summit of Chimborazo. However, they did not report it immediately. The discovery wasn't confirmed until February 2003, when a team hired by the television network Teleamazonas went up the volcano to record a video of the wreckage. Human remains were found, as well as newspapers from the day the plane disappeared, and identification cards of known passengers.

== Discovery ==
After unsuccessful searches for the remains of the aircraft (both by air and on land) in the area of the route towards Cuenca and other places like the Ozogoche area, south of the Chimborazo province, in the Ecuadorian coast and the Ecuadorian East, neither the plane nor its occupants could be found. Relatives of the victims sought supernatural explanations and asked for the help of psychics; some even hinted at the theory of alien abduction. The search was terminated without finding a single trace.

In October 2002, 26 years after the accident, mountaineers Pablo Chíquiza and Flavio Armas ascended a nearly unexplored face of the snowy mountain. On the second day of search they ran into the remains of the plane at 5,550 meters. Impressed by such a finding, they took samples of the cans and newspapers that, in spite of the past 26 years, were still legible. They continued up the mountain, but after climbing several additional meters, they decided to turn around to stay overnight with the remains. On the third day, they descended down the mountain.

Months later, on 14 February 2003, widespread news of the plane's discovery by mountaineer Miguel Cazar, who was interviewed by Teleamazonas, revealed that they had seen both metal and human remains in the García Moreno glacier of the Chimborazo volcano. The mountaineers and discoverers, Chíquiza and Armas, accompanied by soldiers from Ecuador's "Special Forces 9th Brigade" (Spanish: Brigada de Fuerzas Especiales N°9 Patria), arrived at the volcano to mark the exact site where they found the remains of the plane.

After reading the newspapers of the time and confirming with a document from the General Civil Aviation Directorate (DAC) obtained by retired Major Galo Arrieta, they concluded that the plane still had not been found. Arrieta established contact with Pablo Chíquiza during the two days of discovery and promised to help them with the investigation, as well as the subsequent broadcast of the discovery, as long as the first to hear of the news was then-elected President Lucio Gutiérrez.

Therefore, on 23 December of the same year, Chíquiza and Armas ventured back up to the Chimborazo, this time specifically looking for evidence such as personal artifacts or aircraft identifiers that could verify the presumed identity of the flight. At the discretion of the climbers, the search for human remains was laborious. Nevertheless, in spite of the snow that covered the area of the accident, they succeeded in finding the identification document of one of the passengers. With the said document, they believed their search was sufficient and descended the mountain.

After turning over the document and other evidence of the plane to Arrieta, the wait for the news release was longer than they expected. According to the climbers, Arrieta "dragged his feet on the matter" until finally, after pressuring the colonel and not obtaining an interview with Lucio Gutiérrez as they had been promised, they obtained an interview with the minister of Defense, Nelson Herrera, who immediately ordered a military expedition be sent to the place of discovery and to spread the news.

Due to the delayed release of news regarding the discovery, a series of investigations began under the authority of the National Congress, the police, and the government. According to Bernardo Abad, a journalist for Teleamazonas, they asked for thousands of dollars for the video Rodrigo Donoso delivered to the channel and its subsequent broadcast. According to some photographers, he also wanted to sell them photos for 100 dollars.

On their side, Chíquiza and Armas presented another video in Canal Uno hours before Teleamazonas to refute that Donoso and his team were the head of the discovery. Chíquiza, Armas, Donoso, among others, testified in Congress, giving their versions to the district attorney's office as well. On his side of the case, Arrieta admitted that he knew of the discovery but, according to him, "had to make sure the president (Lucio Gutiérrez) was the first to find out and for this reason, could not share the news with other people."

The families now knew where their relatives' bodies laid. Later, by the suggestion of the military and the climbers Chíquiza and Armas, the area where they found the remains was declared a holy field due to the difficulty of recovering all the bodies.

== Cause ==
Speculation surrounding the existence of the flight data recorder (FDR) and the cockpit voice recorder (CVR), the discovery of the plane's remains, as there is no certainty as to whether the plane carried both or either device. In this line, the DAC stated that no black boxes were aboard the aircraft; however, Patricio Mosquera, a former SAETA Viscount pilot who flew HC-ARS the day before its crash and later led SAETA's own search for the plane, declared that it carried at least (possibly) the FDR, which he claimed was mandated by DAC back in 1976. However, Mosquera was not sure whether the Viscount carried the CVR, claiming a long time had elapsed and did not remember it.

The opinion that at least either of the two devices was onboard was echoed by Carlos Serrano, former vice-president of SAETA, who claimed that when HC-ARS and its twin HC-AVP, were bought from Alitalia in the early 1970s, they carried both devices. HC-AVP also crashed in high ground flying the same Quito-Cuenca route with the same flight number (Flight 011) on 23 April 1979, but its wreckage was only found 5 years later in the Amazonian jungle province of Pastaza, 25 miles off course its original path and killing the five crew and 52 passengers.

In the end, the victims' families' agreement to declare the Flight 011 accident site a holy field meant that, aside from ending the search for human remains and aircraft debris, DAC had no official investigation of the tragedy and that neither the organization nor the Attorney's Office of Riobamba would search for it. Consequently, the cause of the accident is not known.

== See also ==
- Aviation accidents and incidents
- List of deadliest aircraft accidents and incidents
- List of accidents and incidents involving commercial aircraft
