= Edmundo Carvajal Airport =

Col. Edmundo Carvajal Airport
- IATA: XMS; ICAO: SEMC

Summary
- Airport type: Public
- Serves: Macas, Ecuador
- Elevation AMSL: 3,452 ft (1,052 m)
- Coordinates: 02°18′00″S 78°07′15″W

Map
- Location of airport in Ecuador

Runways
Direction	Length		Surface
Direction	m	ft	Surface
01/19	2,500	8,202	Asphalt
- Source: WAD GCM

Edmundo Carvajal Airport (Spanish: Aeropuerto "Coronel Edmundo Carvajal" (IATA: XMS, ICAO: SEMC), also known as Macas Airport, is an airport serving Macas, the capital of Morona-Santiago Province in Ecuador. The airport is named for Edmundo Carvajal Flores, a former commander of the Ecuadorian Air Force (Fuerza Aérea Ecuatoriana).

== See also ==
- Transport in Ecuador
- List of airports in Ecuador
