= San Cristóbal Airport =

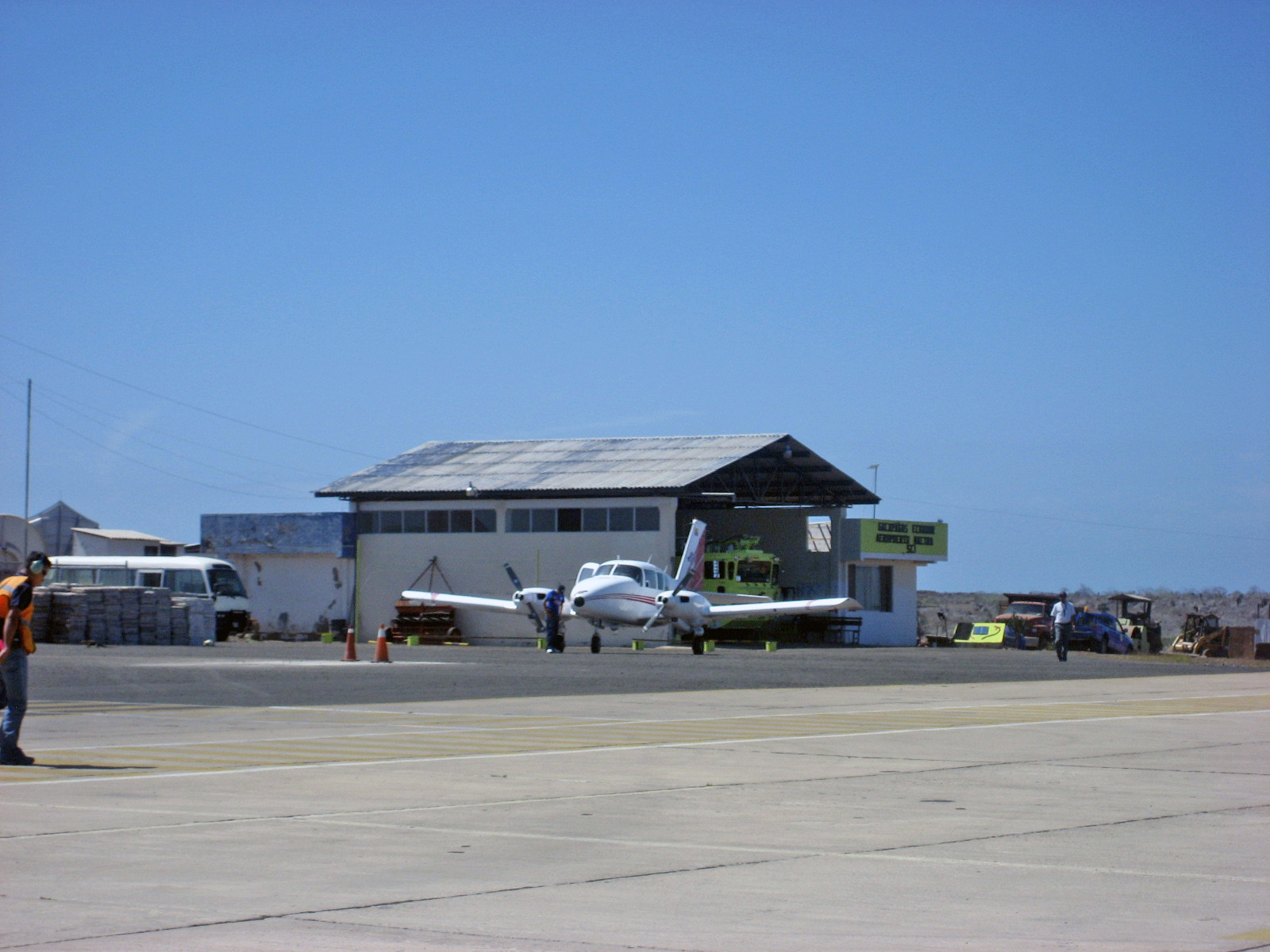
- IATA: SCY; ICAO: SEST

Summary
- Airport type: Public
- Serves: Galápagos Islands, Ecuador
- Location: San Cristóbal, Ecuador
- Elevation AMSL: 62 ft (19 m)
- Coordinates: 00°54′37″S 89°37′03″W

Map
- Location of airport in Ecuador

Runways
Direction	Length		Surface
Direction	m	ft	Surface
17/35	1,900	6,234	Asphalt
- Sources: GCM

San Cristóbal Airport (IATA: SCY, ICAO: SEST) is an airport on the island of San Cristóbal, in the Galápagos Islands of Ecuador. The airport is on the southwestern end of the island, with rising terrain to the northeast. Approaches to both runways are over the ocean.

In June 2019, the Ecuadorian government gave permission for the US military to use the airfield as a base, leading to widespread outcry.

== Airlines and destinations ==
Airlines	Destinations
Avianca Ecuador	Guayaquil, Quito
LATAM Ecuador	Guayaquil, Quito

== Statistics ==
Busiest domestic routes from Seymour Airport (2018)
Rank	City	Passengers	Top carriers
1	(Guayas Province) Guayaquil, Guayas	102,745	Avianca Ecuador, LATAM Ecuador, Aeroregional
2	(Pichincha Province) Quito, Pichincha	76,616	Avianca Ecuador, LATAM Ecuador, Aeroregional

== Accidents and incidents ==
On February 12, 2024 a Britten-Norman BN-2A-21 Islander of ESAV Airlines crashed into the sea about one mile off Punta Carola beach while approaching runway 16. All nine occupants were rescued.

== See also ==
- Transport in Ecuador
- List of airports in Ecuador
