= José Joaquín de Olmedo International Airport =

Ecuatorian airport serving Guayaquil

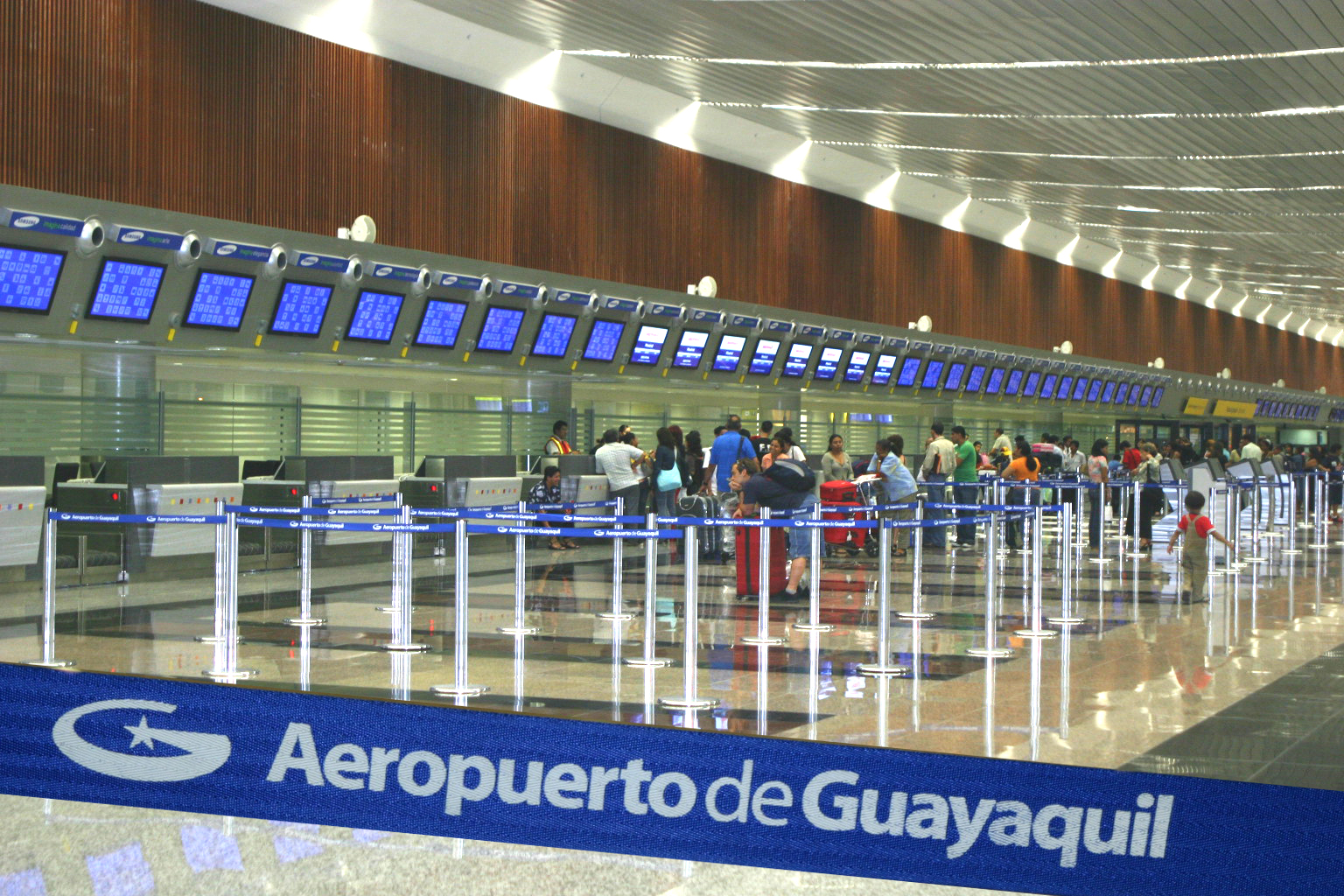
- IATA: GYE; ICAO: SEGU

Summary
- Airport type: Public
- Operator: Terminal Aeroportuaria de Guayaquil S.A. (TAGSA)
- Serves: Guayaquil, Ecuador
- Hub for: Avianca Ecuador; LATAM Ecuador
- Elevation AMSL: 20 ft (6.1 m)
- Coordinates: 02°09′27″S 79°53′01″W
- Website: www.tagsa.aero

Map
- Location in Ecuador

Runways
Direction	Length		Surface
Direction	m	ft	Surface
03/21	2,790	9,154	Asphalt

Statistics (2022)
- Passenger movements: 3,745,552
- Domestic passengers: 1,652,835
- International Passengers: 2,097,717
- Sources: TAGSA WAD Google Maps GCM

José Joaquín de Olmedo International Airport (Spanish: Aeropuerto Internacional José Joaquín de Olmedo; IATA: GYE, ICAO: SEGU) is an international airport serving Guayaquil, the capital of the Guayas Province and the most populous city in Ecuador. It is the second busiest airport in Ecuador.

The airport was named after José Joaquín de Olmedo, a notable Ecuadorian poet, first mayor of Guayaquil, and former president of Ecuador. It was changed from Simón Bolívar International Airport, which is currently the name of the airports in Caracas, Venezuela, and Santa Marta, Colombia.

The airport is on the Avenida de las Américas, 5 kilometres (3 mi) north of Guayaquil's centre. The runway length of 2,790 metres (9,154 ft) includes a 240-metre (790 ft) displaced threshold on Runway 21 and a 100-metre (330 ft) displaced threshold on Runway 03. The runway can accommodate Boeing 747 and Airbus A340-600 aircraft. The airport is in the broad delta of the Guayas River, with level terrain in all quadrants.

In July 2014, the airport domestic area was enlarged; now the airport is capable of handling up to 7.5 million passengers per year. An exit tax is levied on all international tickets, however, it is no longer required to pay at the window when exiting the country.

== History ==
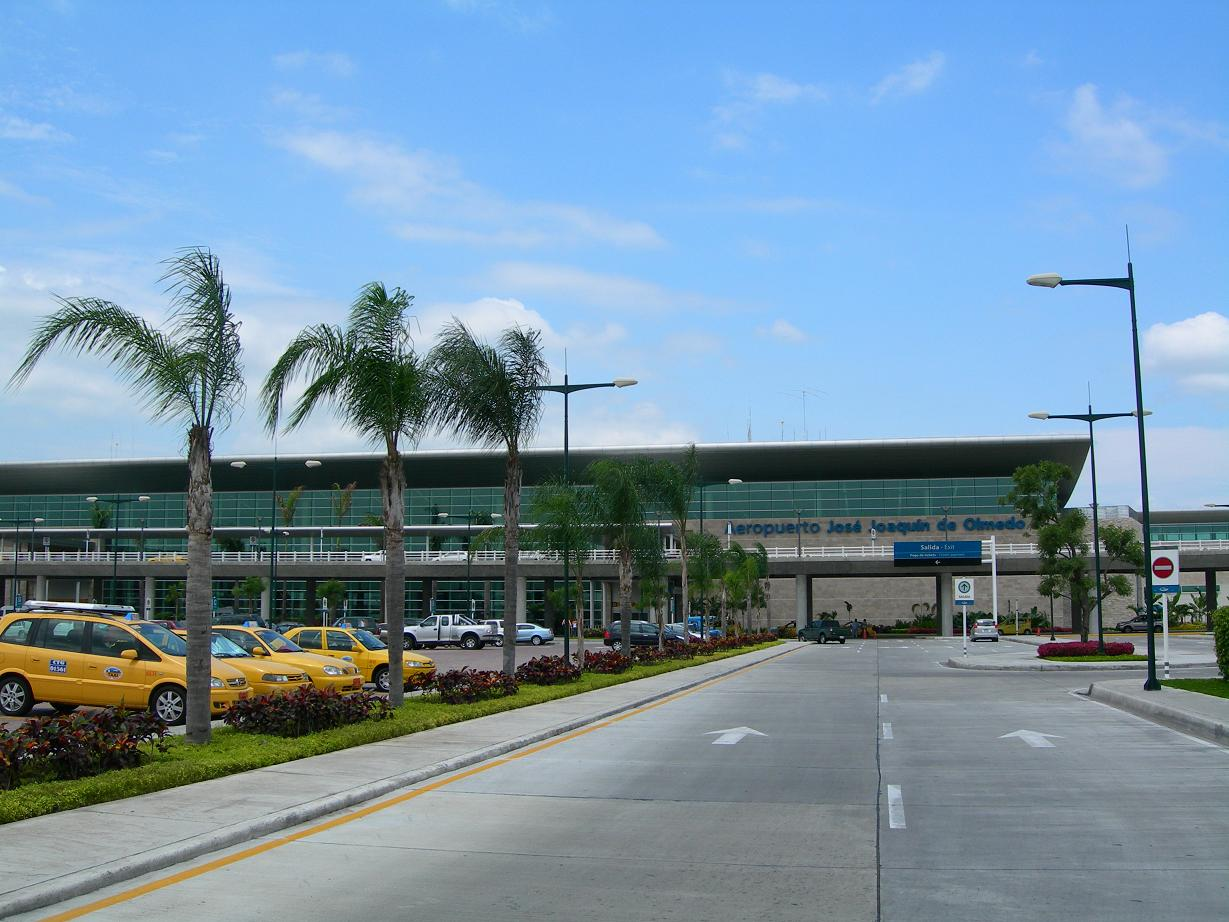
Terminal exterior

The airport, which had the newest terminal in Ecuador, was renamed for José Joaquín de Olmedo in 2006, in preparation for the inauguration of the new 50,000 m^{2} (540,000 sq ft) national and international terminal on 27 July 2006. Although there was an inaugural flight on 28 July 2006, most airlines did not operate completely from the new terminal until August 2006. After that date, the old terminal was closed and it was later turned into a convention center.

The construction of the new terminal and expansion of the runway was finally decided in 2003–2004, years after making the decision that the current infrastructure was not sufficient to cover the city's needs, but that it was not yet commercially viable to build an entirely new airport in the Daular area.

The original project in 2003–2004 contemplated the construction of a 28,000 m^{2} (300,000 sq ft) international terminal and the continuing operation of the old terminal, which would be left to handle only domestic flights. However, it was later decided that the newer 50,000 m^{2} (540,000 sq ft) terminal would handle both national and international traffic, and the older terminal would be closed.

The airport is planned to serve the city of Guayaquil for 10 to 15 years starting in 2006. After this, it is expected to reach a capacity of 5 million passengers a year, and when this happens a new airport will be built in the Daular area, some 20 kilometers outside the city, near the highway that connects Guayaquil to Salinas and other coastal towns.

José Joaquín de Olmedo International Airport was named "Best Airport in Latin America 2008 & 2009" by BusinessWeek and the second best in 2011. All domestic flights going from the Ecuadorian mainland to the Galápagos Islands make a stop in Guayaquil to refuel and pick up passengers due to its location, which is the closest point in Ecuador to the islands.

== Airlines and destinations ==
=== Passenger ===
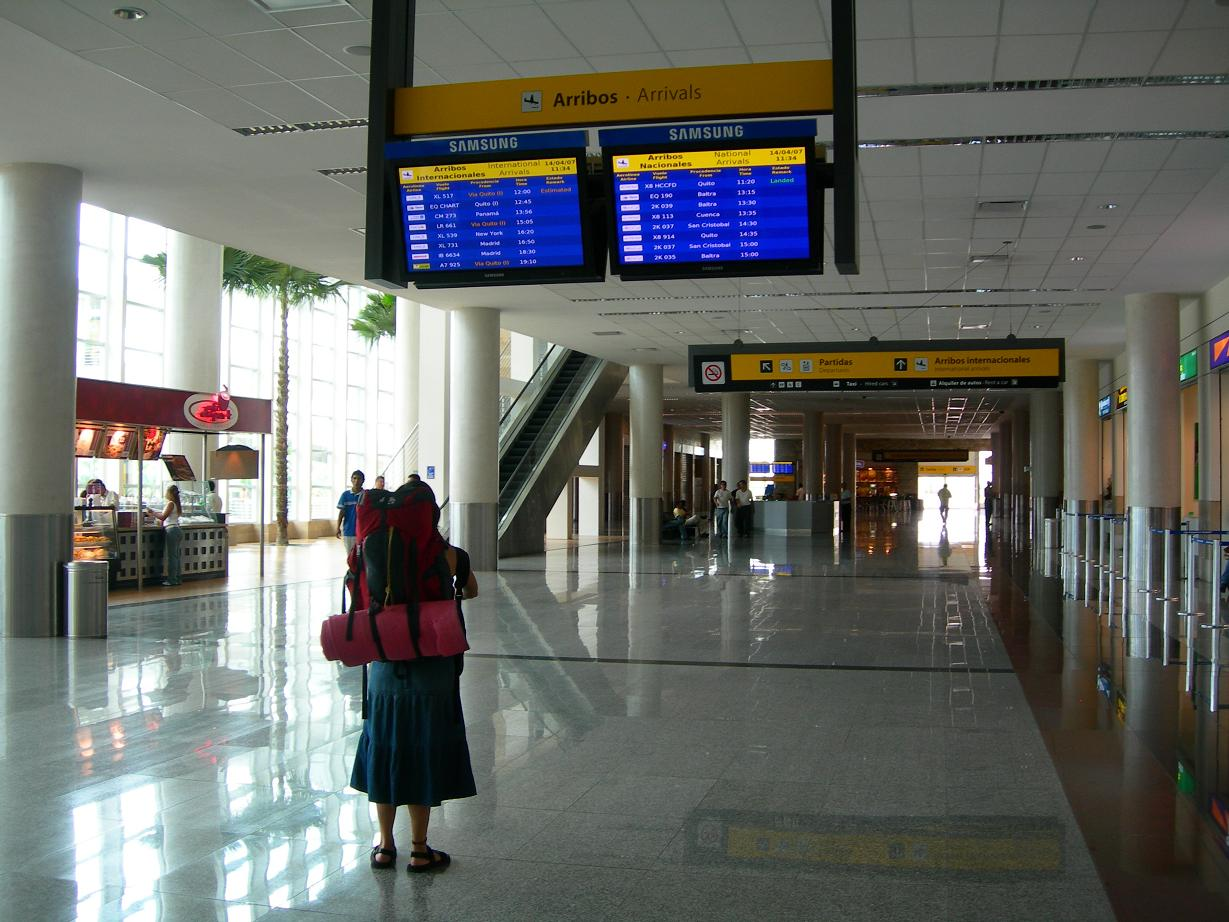
Arrivals area

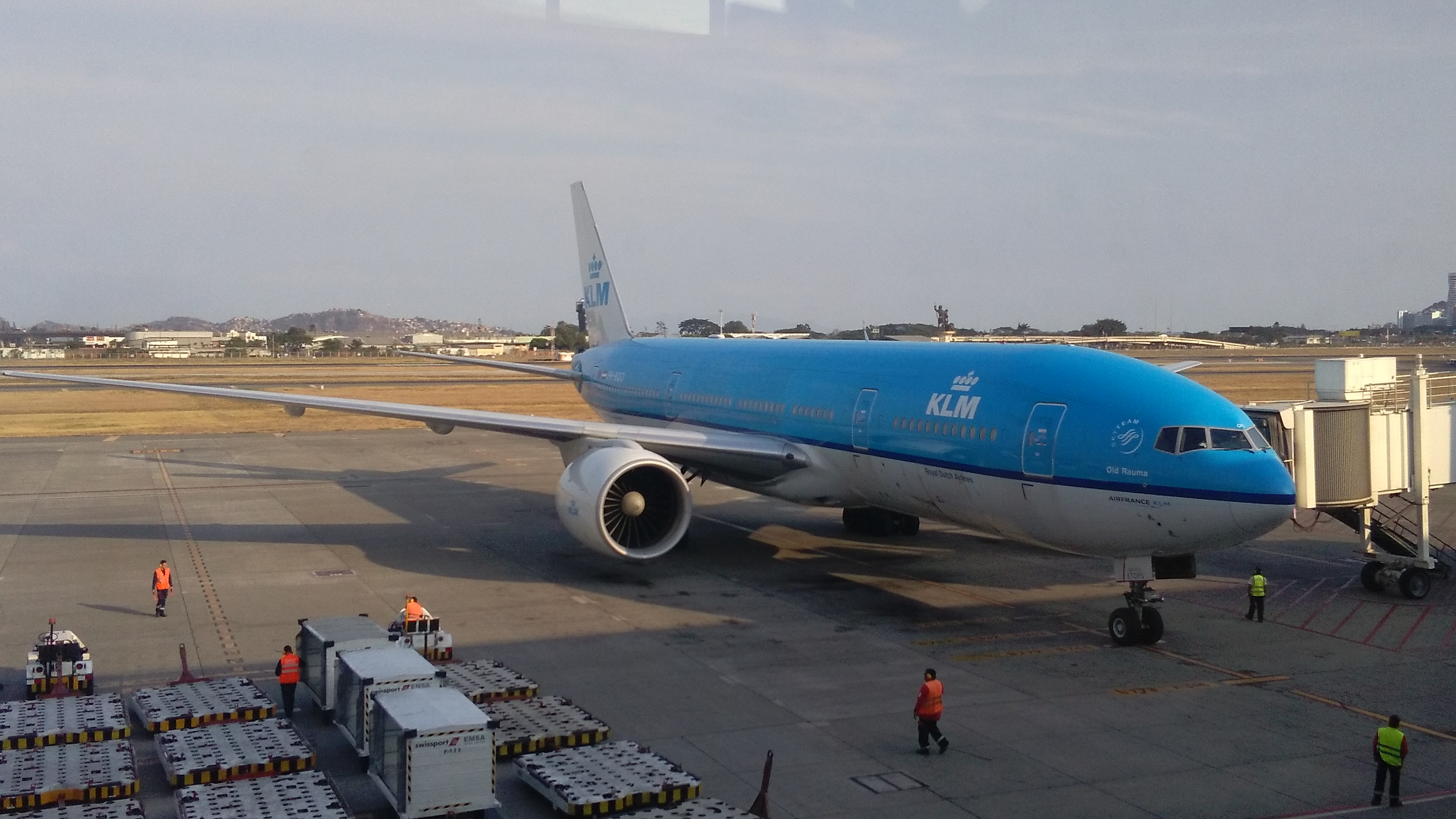
A KLM Boeing 777-200ER at Guayaquil

Terminal entrance and gardens

Airlines	Destinations
Air Europa	Madrid
American Airlines	Miami
Arajet	Punta Cana
Avianca	Bogotá
Avianca Ecuador	Baltra, Bogotá, Buenos Aires–Ezeiza, Cuenca, Medellín–JMC, Miami (ends 30 November 2026), New York–JFK, Quito, San Cristóbal
Avianca El Salvador	San Salvador
Copa Airlines	Panama City–Tocumen
Iberia	Madrid
JetBlue	Fort Lauderdale, New York–JFK
JetSmart Perú	Lima
KLM	Amsterdam
LATAM Ecuador	Baltra, Buenos Aires–Ezeiza, Cuenca, Lima, New York–JFK, Quito, San Cristóbal, Santiago de Chile
LATAM Perú	Lima

== Statistics ==
Busiest international routes (roundtrip) out of José Joaquín de Olmedo International Airport (2018)
Rank	Change	City	Passengers	% Change	Top carriers
1	Steady	Panama City, Panama	420.244	▲5,53%	Copa Airlines
2	Steady	Bogotá, Colombia	267.958	▲12,81%	Avianca Ecuador
3	Steady	Miami, United States	232.521	▲1,35%	American Airlines
4	Steady	Lima, Peru	178.191	▼ -7,53%	Avianca Ecuador, LATAM Ecuador
5	Steady	New York-JFK, United States	161.076	▼ -13,38%	Eastern Airlines, JetBlue
6	Steady	Madrid, Spain	133.062	▲ -20,18%	Air Europa, Iberia
7	▲2	Fort Lauderdale, United States	118.050	▲130,34%	JetBlue Airways, Spirit Airlines
8	▼1	Amsterdam, Netherlands	102.733	▲3,65%	KLM
9	▼1	Santiago, Chile	101.293	▲4,52%	LATAM Ecuador
10	Steady	San Salvador, El Salvador	60.378	▲19,19%	Avianca El Salvador
11	Steady	Cali, Colombia	58.571	▲41,66%	Avianca Ecuador
12	Steady	Barcelona, Venezuela	21.942	▼ -50,13%	Avior Airlines
13	New	Caracas, Venezuela	19.409	▲ New	Avior Airlines

Busiest domestic routes from José Joaquín de Olmedo International Airport (2018)
Rank	Change	City	Passengers	% Change	Top carriers
1	Steady	(Pichincha Province) Quito, Pichincha	1,512,209	▲6,42%	Avianca Ecuador, LATAM Ecuador, TAME
2	Steady	(Galápagos Province) Baltra Island, Galápagos Islands	229.034	▲2,28%	Avianca Ecuador, LATAM Ecuador, TAME
3	Steady	(Galápagos Province) San Cristóbal, Galápagos Islands	102.745	▲10,96%	Avianca Ecuador, LATAM Ecuador, TAME
4	Steady	(Loja Province) Loja, Loja	7.590	▼ -51,49%	TAME
5	Steady	(Azuay Province) Cuenca, Azuay	2.180	▼ -67,36%	TAME

== Accolades ==
- 2011 – 2nd Best Airport in Latin America – Caribbean of the Airport Service Quality Awards by Airports Council International and Best Airport by Size in the 2 to 5 million passenger category.

== Accidents and incidents ==
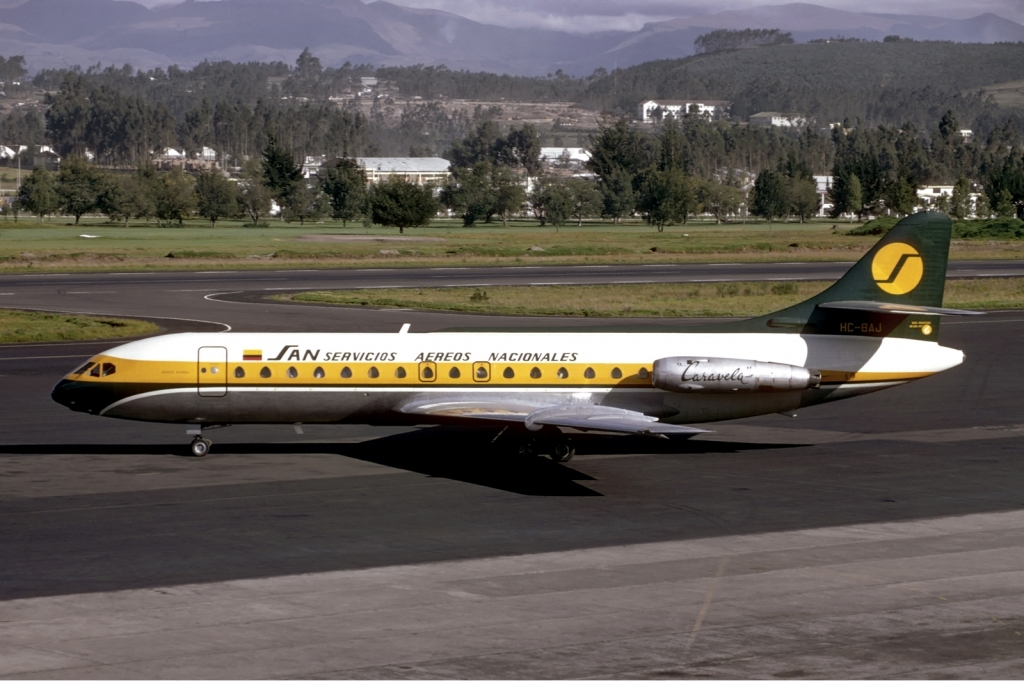
HC-BAJ seen at the Old Mariscal Sucre International Airport in 1975.

- On 29 April 1983, SAN Flight 832, a Sud Aviation Caravelle (registered HC-BAJ) crashed near the southern end of the airport's runway after attempting to execute an emergency landing. The plane had suffered an engine failure shortly after taking off from Guayaquil on a flight to Quito's Mariscal Sucre Airport, and the crew was returning to the airport. However, the second engine failed while overflying the city during the return, and, being barely airborne, the plane stalled just as it approached the airport. Cap. Germán Cruz crash-landed the plane in a muddy puddle, produced by recent El Niño rains near the end of the runway, with the fuselage breaking in three parts but without causing a fire. The accident killed 8 of the 100 people on board and injured several others, but the fact that puddle served as a form of cushion helped avoid more fatalities. The pilot had previously reported engine issues and had tested the plane the previous day, after which it was subjected to maintenance and was later reported as fit to fly shortly before the ill-fated flight.

== See also ==
- Transport in Ecuador
- List of airports in Ecuador
