= Transport in Ecuador =

Transport infrastructure networks in Ecuador

Transportation in Ecuador is the transport infrastructure networks in Ecuador and those connecting the country with other countries. Transportation in Ecuador include aviation, highways, pipelines, ports and harbors, railways and waterways. Apart from transporting passengers, the country is a relatively small exporter of fruits and vegetables such as banana, papayas and pineapples.

== Aviation ==
=== National airlines ===
- Avianca
- LATAM Airlines
- Aeroregional

=== Airports ===
345 (2025)

==== Airports (paved) ====
- total: 317 (2025)
  - over 3,047 m: 3 (2010)
  - 2,438 to 3,047 m: 4 (2010)
  - 1,524 to 2,437 m: 19 (2010)
  - 914 to 1,523 m: 29 (2010)
  - under 914 m: 43 (2010)

==== Airports (unpaved) ====
total: 261
914 to 1,523 m:33
under 914 m:228

=== Heliports ===
28 (2025)

== Highways ==
- total: 43,197 kilometres (26,841 mi)
  - paved: 6,467 kilometres (4,018 mi)
  - unpaved: 36,730 kilometres (22,820 mi) (2004 est.)

The Sierra Region still plays an important role in transportation throughout the country. The Pan-American Highway crosses it from north to south. Ecuador has managed to update some roads into four-lane freeways:

- Quito – Alpichacas. Length: 33 km.
- Guayaquil ring-road. Length: 46 km.
- Guayaquil – Taura. Length: 30 km.
- Guayaquil – Cerro Blanco. Length: 27 km.
- Machala – Pasaje. Length: 23 km.

=== Bus transport ===
Ecuador has a variety of bus services.

The general types of service include:

- luxury buses — autobús de lujo, which travel the main routes between cities.
- standard buses — these travel more local routes and will stop for any passengers that hails them.
- minibuses — busetas which service the outer fringes of the bus networks
- rancheras — trucks which have been converted to buses by adding wooden benches. These service the poorer, rural areas, along with camionetas, which are converted pickup trucks.

In the capital, Quito, boarding platforms are used to put passengers at the same level as the entrance to the bus.

== Pipelines ==
- 485 km extra heavy crude,
- 123 km gas,
- 2,131 km oil,
- 1,526 km refined products (2025)

== Ports and harbors ==
Ecuador has:

- 6 total ports (2024)
  - 0 large
  - 0 medium
  - 2 small
  - 4 very small
  - 5 ports with oil terminals
  - key ports: Esmeraldas, Guayaquil, La Libertad, Manta, Puerto Bolivar, Puerto Maritimo de Guayaquil

=== Pacific Ocean ===
- Esmeraldas
- Guayaquil, La Libertad
- Manta
- Puerto Bolívar
- San Lorenzo

=== Merchant marine ===
- total: 31 ships (1,000 gross tonnage (GT) or over) totaling 184,819 GT/300,339 tonnes deadweight (DWT)
- ships by type: (2006 est.)
  - Chemical tanker 1
  - gas carrying tanker 1
  - Passenger ships 7
  - Petroleum tankers 21
  - Specialized tanker 1
- Foreign-owned: 2
  - Norway 1
  - Paraguay 1
- Registered in other countries 1
  - Georgia 1

== Railways ==
Total: 812 km (single track)
Narrow gauge: 812 km of 3 ft 6 in (1,067 mm) gauge.

All services ceased in 2020.

=== Proposals ===
There is a proposed rail connection with Colombia. On 5 July 2008, a meeting took place between Venezuela, Colombia and Ecuador regarding a railway for freight and passengers to link the three countries, and linking the Pacific with the Atlantic also. There is no railway service to Peru.

=== Metro services ===
In 2020, the Cuenca Tramway (Tranvía Cuenca), the first modern rail transit line in Ecuador, opened for service.

The Quito Metro initiated its commercial operations on 1 December 2023.

== Waterways ==
1,500 kilometres (930 mi)

== See also ==
- Chiva bus
- Share taxi
- Trolleybuses in Quito
