= Antisana Ecological Reserve =

Protected area in Ecuador

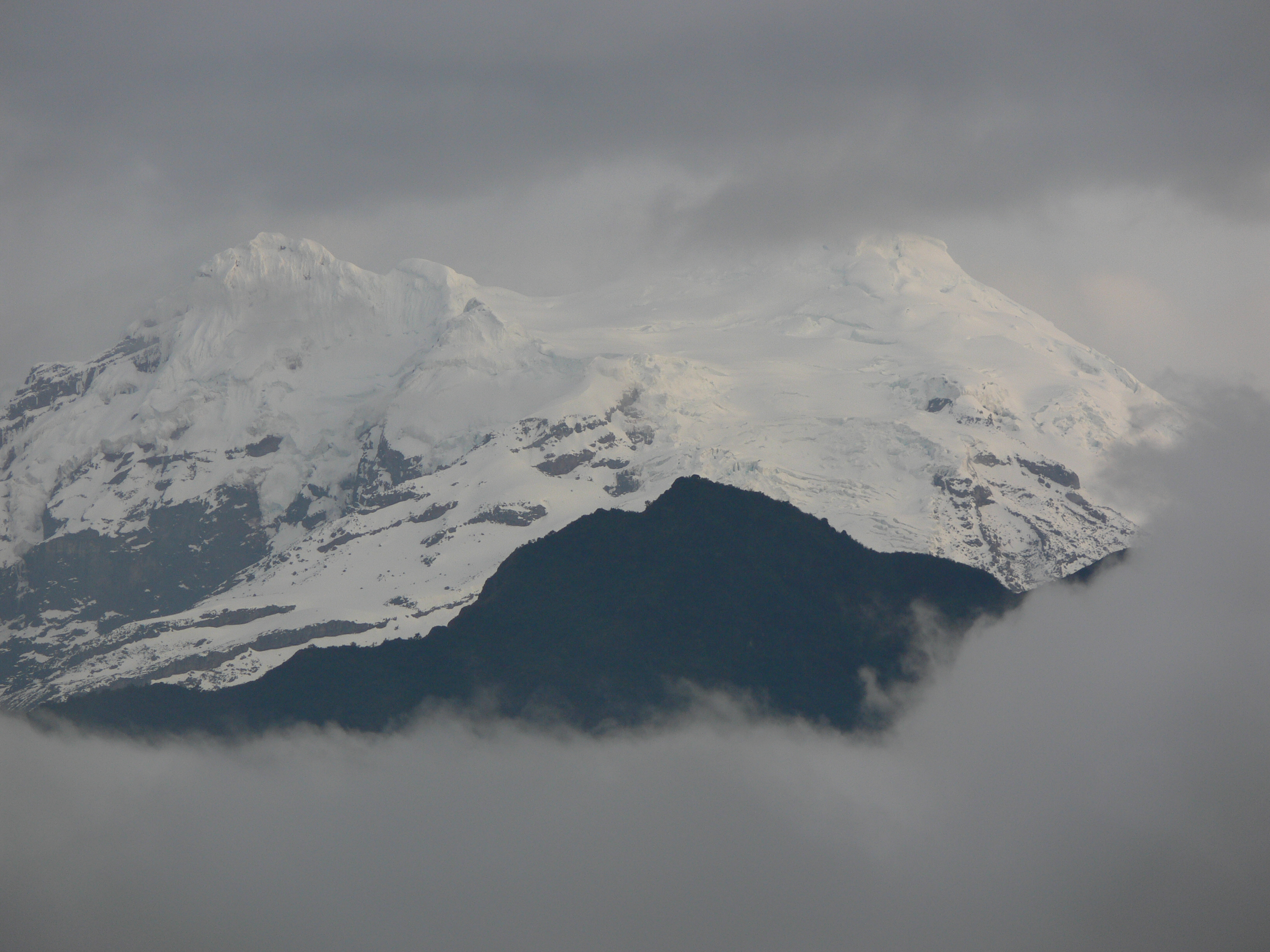
- Antisana volcano, the park's namesake
- Interactive map of Antisana Ecological Reserve
- Location: Ecuador; Napo Province, Quijos Canton and Archidona Canton
- Coordinates: 0.54°S 78.03°W
- Area: 120,000 ha (300,000 acres)
- Established: July 1993

Antisana Ecological Reserve (Spanish: Reserva Ecológica Antisana) is a protected area in Ecuador situated in the Napo Province, Quijos Canton and Archidona Canton.

== Flora and fauna ==
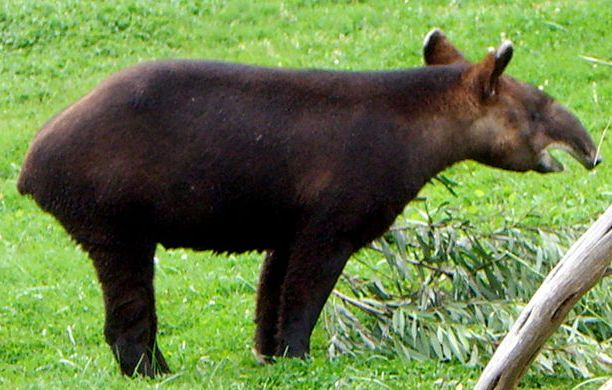
The mountain tapir (Tapirus pinchaque) is one of the rare animals found in Antisana Ecological Reserve.

Rare animals and plants found in or near the reserve include:

- White-fronted spider monkey (Ateles belzebuth) – Endangered
- Northern pudu (Pudu mephistophiles) – Vulnerable
- Mountain tapir (Tapirus pinchaque) – Endangered
- Spectacled bear ("Tremarctos ornatus") – Vulnerable
- Oncilla (Leopardus tigrinus) – Vulnerable
- Bush dog (Speothos venaticus) – Near Threatened
- Wattled guan (Aburria aburri) – Near Threatened
- Fuegian snipe (Gallinago stricklandii) – Near Threatened
- Andean condor (Vultur gryphus) – Near Threatened
- Spot-winged parrotlet (Touit stictopterus) – Vulnerable
- Greater scythebill (Campylorhamphus pucherani) – Near Threatened
- Southeastern giant antpitta, Grallaria gigantea gigantea – Vulnerable
- Giant conebill (Oreomanes fraseri) – Near Threatened
- Napo plump toad (Osornophryne antisana) – Endangered
- Senecio antisanae / Senecio iscoensis (= Aetheolaena senecioides?) – Data Deficient

Other notable flora and fauna of the park are, for example:

- Andean gull (Larus serranus)
- Silvery grebe (Podiceps occipitalis)
- Black-faced ibis (Theristicus melanopis)
- Oreopanax confusus
- Chuquiraga jussieui

== See also ==
- Mikakucha
- Environment of Ecuador
