= Aguano (disambiguation) =

The Aguano are an indigenous people of Peru.

Aguano may also refer to:

- Aguano language, the extinct language of the Aguano people
- Ahuano, Ecuador, also called Aguano, a village in Napo Province, Ecuador
