= Arosemena =

Arosemena is a surname. Notable people with the surname include:

- Alcibíades Arosemena (1883–1958), Panamanian politician
- Carlos Julio Arosemena Monroy (1919–2004), President of Ecuador from November 7, 1961 to July 11, 1963
- Carlos Julio Arosemena Tola (1888–1952), President of Ecuador from September 15, 1947 to September 1, 1948
- Domingo Díaz Arosemena (1875–1949), Panamanian politician
- Emita Arosemena (born 1931), winner of the Miss Panamá 1953 title
- Esmeralda Arosemena de Troitiño (born 1944), judge from Panama and president of the Inter-American Commission on Human Rights
- Florencio Harmodio Arosemena (1872–1945), President of Panama from October 1, 1928 to January 3, 1931
- Juan Demóstenes Arosemena (1879–1939), President of Panama from October 1, 1936 to December 16, 1939
- Justo Arosemena (1817–1896), statesman, writer, lawyer, and politician from Panama
- Justo Arosemena Lacayo (1929–2000), Colombian sculptor born in Panama
- Otto Arosemena (1925–1984), President of Ecuador from November 16, 1966 to September 1, 1968
- Pablo Arosemena (1836–1920), First Vice President of Panama from October 5, 1910 to October 1, 1912
- Reggie Arosemena (born 1986), football Midfielder
- Rubén Arosemena (born 1961), the Second Vice President of Panama from 2004 to 2009

== See also ==
- Carlos Julio Arosemena Tola Canton, canton of Ecuador, located in the Napo Province
- Carlos Julio Arosemena Tola, Ecuador, location in the Napo Province, Ecuador
- Arosen
