= Santa Crucino =

Santa Crucino or Santacrucino may refer to:

- Santa Crucino people, an ethnic group of Peru
- Santa Crucino language, a language of Peru

== See also ==
- Santacrucian, a period in geologic time
- Santa Cruz (disambiguation)
