= TNW =

TNW may refer to:

- Tactical nuclear weapon, a nuclear weapon which is designed to be used on a battlefield in military situations
- Tonsawang language (ISO 639 code: tnw)
- Trans Nation Airways (ICAO airline code: TNW) Ethiopian airline
- Jumandy Airport (IATA airport code: TNW) in Tena, Napo Province, Ecuador
- Mayor Galo de la Torre Airport (IATA airport code: TNW) defunct airport in Tena, Napo Province, Ecuador
- Tin Creek Airport (FAA airport code: TNW) in Farewell Lake, Alaska, USA; see List of airports in Alaska
- Warsaw Scientific Society (Polish: Towarzystwo Naukowe Warszawskie) a.k.a. "TNW"
- Tarifverbund Nordwestschweiz, Swiss public transit tariff network
- /ᵗnʷ/ Latin-script trigraph (tnw) for Arrernte, see List of Latin-script trigraphs
- Team Ninja Warrior, U.S. TV series based on SASUKE/Ninja Warrior telesport
- The Next Web, a website
- The Northern Whig, bar in Belfast, Northern Ireland
  - The Northern Whig, Irish newspaper
