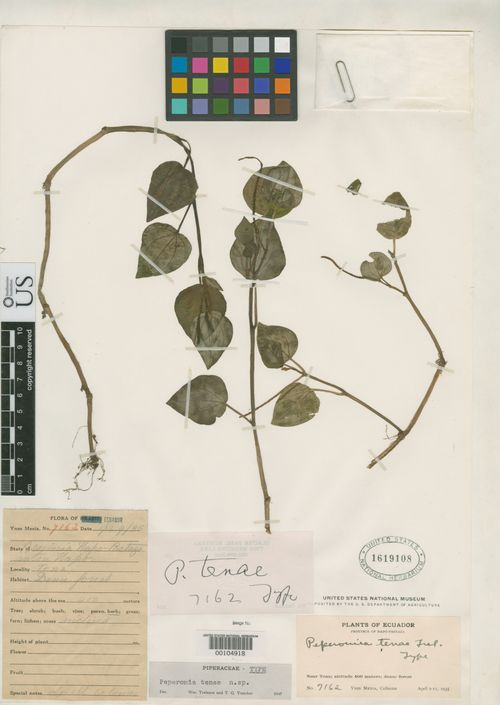

Scientific classification
- Kingdom: Plantae
- Clade: Tracheophytes
- Clade: Angiosperms
- Clade: Magnoliids
- Order: Piperales
- Family: Piperaceae
- Genus: Peperomia
- Species: P. tenae

Binomial name
- Peperomia tenae Trel. & Yunck.

= Peperomia tenae =

Species of flowering plant

Peperomia tenae is a species of flowering plant in the genus Peperomia. It was first described by William Trelease & Truman G. Yuncker and published in the book "The Piperaceae of northern South America 2: 482, f. 424. 1950". The species name came from Tena, Ecuador, where first specimens of this species were collected.

== Distribution ==
It is endemic to Ecuador. First specimens where found at an altitude of 400 meters near Tena.

- Ecuador
  - Ambato
  - Napo
  - Pastaza
