= Mayor Galo de la Torre Airport =

- IATA: TNW; ICAO: SETE

Summary
- Airport type: Public, defunct
- Location: Tena, Napo Province, Ecuador
- Closed: 2001
- Elevation AMSL: 521 m / 1,708 ft
- Coordinates: 0°59′20″S 77°49′18″W

Map
- Location in Ecuador

Runways
Direction	Length		Surface
Direction	m	ft	Surface
Closed	1,200	3,937	Asphalt

Mayor Galo de la Torre Airport (Spanish: Aeropuerto Mayor Galo de la Torre) (IATA: TNW, ICAO: SETE) was an airport serving Tena, Napo Province, Ecuador. It closed in 2001 and was replaced by Jumandy Airport, 25 km (16 mi) to the east, in 2011.

== History ==
Mayor Galo de la Torre Airport was constructed along with airstrips at Pano and Shandia to improve connectivity between Napo Province and the rest of the country. Unlike the latter two which began to decline from the 1950s onward, the airport in Tena was highly used for passenger and cargo transport to and from Quito. The airport was also used by the Ecuadorian Army for logistic works.

During the 1960s and 70s, Transportes Aéreos Orientales (TAO) operated flights between Tena and Quito. SAEREO also flew this route at one point.

The airport was closed in 2001, replaced by Jumandy Airport in Ahuano in 2011.

== Infrastructure ==
At the time of its closure, Mayor Galo de la Torre Airport had an asphalt runway measuring 1,200 by 15 metres (3,937 ft × 49 ft).

== See also ==
- Jumandy Airport
