= Awano =

Awano may refer to:

- Awano people, an ethnic group of Peru
- Awano language, a language of Peru
- Awano, Tochigi, a former town in Tochigi Prefecture, Japan
- Awano Station, a railway station in Fukui Prefecture, Japan (not to be confused with Nagato-Awano Station in Yamaguchi Prefecture)
- Awano, a Japanese surname; notable people include:
  - Hideyuki Awano (born 1964), baseball player
  - Rainosuke Awano, gardener
  - Yasuhiro Awano (born 1988), martial artist
