= Shandia =

- Location within Ecuador
- Coordinates: 1.071377°S 77.897233°W
- Country: Ecuador
- Province: Napo
- Canton: Tena

Government
- Time zone: UTC-5 (ECT)
- Area code: (+593) 6
- Climate: Af

Shandia (pronounced SHAN-dya) is a village located in the rainforest of eastern Ecuador. It is inhabited mostly by indigenous peoples of the Kichwa Nationality.

== Geography ==
Shandia is some 4 kilometres (2 miles) from the city of Tena, the capital of Napo Province.

== History ==
It was used as a mission station by missionaries Jim Elliot and Pete Fleming from 1952 to 1954. Fleming later married and moved to a different station, but the Elliots stayed there until Jim's death in 1956. Jim's wife, Elisabeth Elliot, continued to work among the Huaorani for 2 more years.

Now it is visited by local missions groups, some were sponsored by the organization Youth World until 2025. The teams minister to the village.

There was a devastating flood in Shandia in 1953 that destroyed many of the houses.

== Nature ==
A small jungle get away can also be found in the village. It is run by the villagers and is used mainly by the occasional hiker who wishes to explore the surrounding jungle.
