= Jumandy Airport =

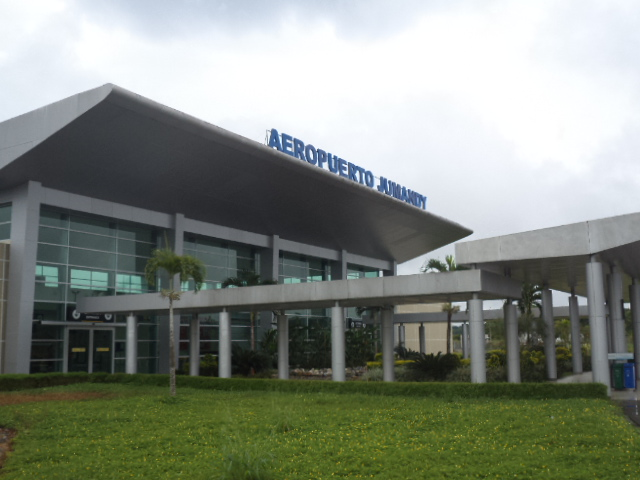
- IATA: TNW; ICAO: SEJD

Summary
- Airport type: Public
- Owner: Government of Ecuador
- Operator: Dirección General de Aviación Civil (Ecuador)
- Serves: Tena
- Location: Ahuano, Napo Province, Ecuador
- Elevation AMSL: 1,234 ft / 376 m
- Coordinates: 01°03′35″S 77°35′00″W

Map
- Location in Ecuador

Runways
Direction	Length		Surface
Direction	m	ft	Surface
09/27	2,600	8,530	Asphalt
- Source: SkyVector GCM

Jumandy Airport (Spanish: Aeropuerto Jumandy) (IATA: TNW, ICAO: SEJD) is an airport serving Tena, Napo Province, Ecuador. It is 3 kilometres (1.9 mi) west of the village of Ahuano, and about 25 kilometres (16 mi) from Tena. It replaces Tena's Mayor Galo de la Torre Airport, which closed in 2001.

Jumandy Airport takes its name from Jumandy, the great cacique (indigenous leader) of Napo who led a 1578 revolt against the Spanish.

The airport was opened in 2011 to facilitate tourism to the Ecuadoran Amazon, in which Tena is located. However, it had not been performing well and lost its only scheduled flight in January 2016. It is currently used by flying schools and general aviation.

== History ==
Jumandy Airport was constructed well outside Tena near the village of Ahuano. It was built by Consorcio Tena (Tena Consortium) at a cost of more than USD40 million. After two years of work, the airport was inaugurated on 29 April 2011 by President Rafael Correa.

On 5 June 2012, TAME commenced thrice weekly Quito–Macas–Tena–Quito service. Flights were operated using ATR 42-500 aircraft. However, as early as 2013, the airline was suffering from low passenger loads on the route. Reasons included the distance between Tena and Jumandy Airport and the good quality of roads to Tena, which allow for fast, cheap transport by car or bus to the city.

On 11 January 2016, TAME ended its flights to Tena, leaving Jumandy Airport without scheduled service. The airline had been losing US$1.2 million annually on the route.

After a caricaturist labeled the airport a white elephant, President Correa announced the airport would not be closed, but rather converted into an airbase for the Ecuadorian Air Force. In addition, the Ecuadorian Army will relocate to Jumandy from Río Amazonas Airport in Shell.

== Facilities ==
The runway at Jumandy Airport measures 2,600 metres (8,500 ft), making it the fourth longest runway in the country, behind the runways at Guayaquil, Quito and Latacunga airports. It can handle aircraft as large as the Boeing 767. The apron occupies 17,600 m^{2} (189,000 ft^{2}).

The Jumandy VOR-DME (Ident: JUV) and non-directional beacon (Ident: JUV, JUM, or TNB, approach dependent) are located on the field.

The passenger terminal can handle up to 150 passengers, while the VIP terminal has a capacity of 30 persons. In addition, the airport fuel tanks can hold up to 22,000 gallons.

== See also ==
- List of airports in Ecuador
- Transport in Ecuador
