= Mikakucha =

- Location within Ecuador
- Location: Ecuador; Napo Province
- Coordinates: 0°32′36″S 78°12′36″W

Mikakucha (Kichwa mika wooden plate, kucha lake, Hispanicized names Micacocha, Laguna de La Mica, Laguna La Mica, Laguna de Mica) is a lake in the Napo Province in Ecuador. It is situated in the Antisana Ecological Reserve, southwest of the volcano Antisana.
