= Chalpi =

- Location in Ecuador
- Coordinates: 0°22′31.27″S 78°4′39.58″W
- Country: Ecuador
- Province: Napo
- Canton: Quijos
- Elevation: 3,052 m (10,013 ft)
- Time zone: UTC-5 (Ecuador Time)

Chalpi is a village in Quijos canton, Napo Province in Ecuador.

== Climate ==
Chalpi has a Subtropical highland climate (Cfb) with cool weather year-round and moderately heavy rainfall.

Climate data for Chalpi
Month	Jan	Feb	Mar	Apr	May	Jun	Jul	Aug	Sep	Oct	Nov	Dec	Year
Mean daily maximum °C (°F)	16.4 (61.5)	16.2 (61.2)	15.8 (60.4)	16.0 (60.8)	15.7 (60.3)	14.7 (58.5)	14.4 (57.9)	14.8 (58.6)	15.5 (59.9)	16.5 (61.7)	17.0 (62.6)	16.6 (61.9)	15.8 (60.4)
Daily mean °C (°F)	11.1 (52.0)	11.1 (52.0)	11.1 (52.0)	11.3 (52.3)	11.1 (52.0)	10.4 (50.7)	10.1 (50.2)	10.3 (50.5)	10.7 (51.3)	11.2 (52.2)	11.6 (52.9)	11.2 (52.2)	10.9 (51.7)
Mean daily minimum °C (°F)	5.9 (42.6)	6.1 (43.0)	6.5 (43.7)	6.7 (44.1)	6.6 (43.9)	6.1 (43.0)	5.9 (42.6)	5.8 (42.4)	5.9 (42.6)	6.0 (42.8)	6.2 (43.2)	5.9 (42.6)	6.1 (43.0)
Average precipitation mm (inches)	103 (4.1)	86 (3.4)	106 (4.2)	119 (4.7)	131 (5.2)	123 (4.8)	126 (5.0)	107 (4.2)	107 (4.2)	104 (4.1)	94 (3.7)	81 (3.2)	1,287 (50.8)
Source: Climate-Data.org
