= Archidona, Ecuador =

Archidona
- Town
- Flag
- Nickname: Ciudad de la chonta (City of the Airplanes)
- Location in Ecuador
- Coordinates: 0°55′S 77°47′W
- Country: Ecuador
- Province: Napo
- Canton: Archidona
- Founded: April 21, 1560

Government
  - Mayor: Jose Toapanta

Area
  - Town: 2.92 km^{2} (1.13 sq mi)
- Elevation: 577 m (1,893 ft)

Population (2022 census)
  - Town: 7,353
  - Density: 2,520/km^{2} (6,520/sq mi)
- Demonym: archidonense
- Climate: Af

Archidona is a colonial town, founded in 1560, north of Tena, Ecuador in the Napo Province. Archidona still serves as one of the region's main missionary outposts. It's also a business and social center for the small Kichwa communities in the vicinity.

Archidona's festivals attract people from all around, and several times throughout the year there are Kichwa beauty and culture pageants. In these pageants, contestants from the many Kichwa communities in the area compete for the title of "Queen of the Kichwa." The pageants provide an opportunity to hear Kichwa spoken and sung and to see some very old dances and customs. There are several eliminatory rounds, and the finale is usually held in April. During these pageants, one or two fairs usually come to town. There are rides and food stands, lasting several weeks. There is also an open market held in the streets, making it difficult to drive for the few cars in the town. However, the market provides all kinds of things, from hand-made cloths to traditional food.

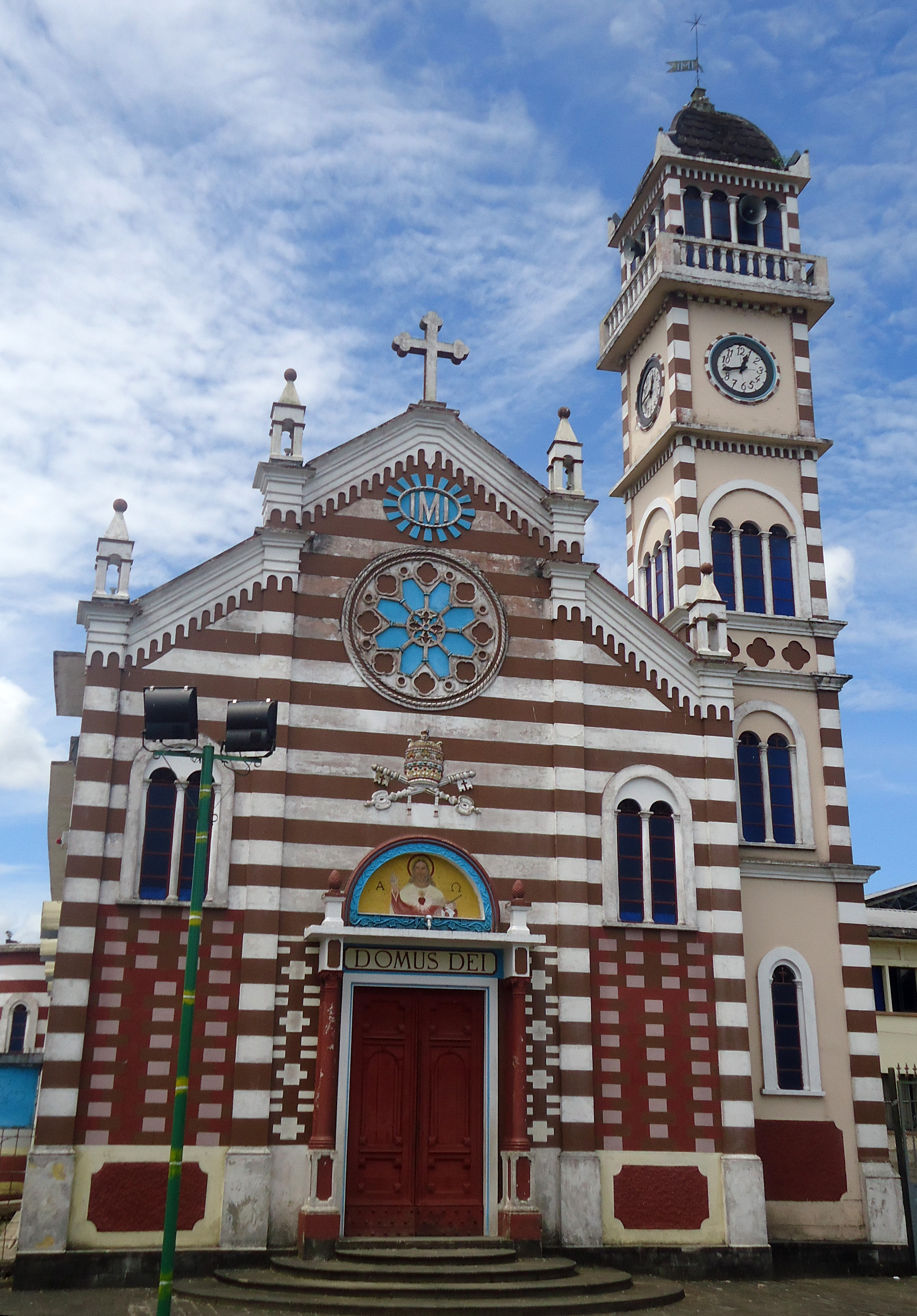
A picture of Igelsia de Archidona from the ground. It is a very large building, located at the heart of Archidona.

Archidona also has several churches because of the strong Catholic influence in the country. The most popular church is simply known as Iglesia de Archidona. There is a baptist church as well, near the edge of town. It was run by American missionaries for over 10 years, until 2017.
