= Gorytvesica cosangana =

Scientific classification
- Kingdom: Animalia
- Phylum: Arthropoda
- Class: Insecta
- Order: Lepidoptera
- Family: Tortricidae
- Genus: Gorytvesica
- Species: G. cosangana

Binomial name
- Gorytvesica cosangana Razowski & Pelz, 2005

Species of moth

Gorytvesica cosangana is a species of moth of the family Tortricidae. It is found in Napo Province, Ecuador.

The wingspan is 14–17 mm.

== Etymology ==
The species name refers to the type locality, Cosanga.
