= Lobogenesis inserata =

Scientific classification
- Kingdom: Animalia
- Phylum: Arthropoda
- Class: Insecta
- Order: Lepidoptera
- Family: Tortricidae
- Genus: Lobogenesis
- Species: L. inserata

Binomial name
- Lobogenesis inserata Razowski, 2005

Species of moth

Lobogenesis inserata is a species of moth of the family Tortricidae. It is found in Napo Province, Ecuador.
