= Lobogenesis calamistrana =

Scientific classification
- Kingdom: Animalia
- Phylum: Arthropoda
- Class: Insecta
- Order: Lepidoptera
- Family: Tortricidae
- Genus: Lobogenesis
- Species: L. calamistrana

Binomial name
- Lobogenesis calamistrana Razowski & Pelz, 2005

Species of moth

Lobogenesis calamistrana is a species of moth of the family Tortricidae. It is known from Napo Province, Ecuador.
