= Olga Elena Mattei =

Colombian poet

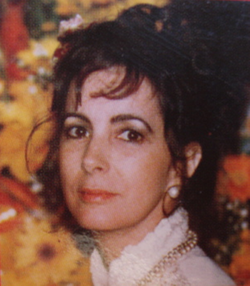
- Born: 1933 (age 92–93); Arecibo, Puerto Rico
- Occupation: Poet

Olga Elena Mattei Echavarría (born 1933 in Arecibo, Puerto Rico) is a Puerto Rican-born Colombian poet. She has won several poetry awards in Colombia and other Spanish-speaking countries. She has written around 23 books published, 41 unpublished and thousands of poems to be typed and compiled, all of them in Spanish.

== Career ==
Mattei graduated in philosophy and arts at the Universidad Pontificia Bolivariana in Medellín.

She first received public attention with her work Sílabas de arena (1962) which described her Colombian daily life with a novel, lighter language style. Her poem La señora burguesa is a severe take on women's mundane urban life.

In 1979 she participated in the International Writers Program at the University of Iowa (Usono).

Her cantata Cosmofonía was first performed on radio and TV in France in 1976, led by conductor Marc Carles. Her multimedia poem Cosmoagonia, with scientific (astronomy) and humanistic content, has been performed in eight important planetariums around the world such as New York City and Washington.

She has performed more than 400 recitals. She has been a lecturer in archaeology, Egyptian civilization, Angkor Vat, the Khmer culture and the Mayan culture. Her work has been included in more than 120 international and national anthologies and dictionaries.

She was an honorary cultural journalist for 25 years at El Colombiano. For almost 15 years, she was the only critic of classical music, visual arts, poetry and civics (ad honorem) of Medellín for El Mundo. She has conducted cultural radio and television programs. She covered the Orquesta Filarmonica de Medellin concerts. Besides, she is lecturer of arts and ancient cultures.

== Awards ==
- 1973: Guillermo Valencia National Poetry Award
- 1974: Café Marfil International Poetry Award (Madrid)
- 1976: Ordre des Aniserteurs du Roi (Paris)
- 2004: Porfirio Barba Jacob National Poetry Award (Medellín)
- 2007: Premio Nacional de Poesía Meira del Mar

Up to 2009 she has received 18 national and international public recognition, awards and decorations.

She was included in the list of the 100 Antioquenos of the 20th century and in the collection of postcards "Grandes Hombres de Antioquia" among 12 other women, where she was the only writer, as well as in a list of biographical investigations of the University of Antioquia of the ten most important Antioqueno writers, in which she was the only living poet.

== Works ==
- Sílabas de arena (1962) 118 pgs, Ed. Imprenta Departamental de Antioquia, "Ediciones La Tertulia", Medellín, 1962
- Pentafonía (1964) 64 pgs, Ed. Universidad Pontificia Bolivariana, colecciòn "Rojo y Negro", Medellín, 1964
- La gente (1974) 182 pgs, Ed. Colcultura, Colección "Biblioteca Colombiana de Cultura", Bogotá, 1974
- Huellas en el agua (1974) International Poetry Award "Cafe Marfil" 1974
- Cosmofonía (Cantata) (1977) with music of Marc Carles. Ed. Multipograficas Medellín 1977
- Conclusiones finales (1989) 38 pags, Ed. Talleres Editoriales del Museo Rayo, Roldanillo (Valle del Cauca, Colombia), 1989
- Cosmoagonía (Misa cósmica) (1993)
- Regiones del más acá (1994) 465 pags, Ed. Secretaria de Cultura Departamental de Antioquia,"Colección de Autores Antioqueños", Medellín, 1994
- Los ángeles del Oceano (2000) 41 pgs, Ed. Talleres Editoriales del Museo Rayo. Roldanillo (Valle del Cauca, Colombia)
- Escuchando al Infinito (2005), 99 pgs, Sic, Bucaramanga. ISBN 958-708-124-2
- El profundo Placer de este Dolor (2007) 121 pgs Ed. Fondo ditorial Ateneo. Medellín, 2007
- Cierra la Puerta de la Ciudad (2007) 59 pgs, Ed. Uryco. Medellín, 2007. National Poetry Prize Meira del Mar (2007)

Private life

In the 1960s, she was in a relationship with Justo Arosemena Lacayo (1929-2000).
