= Lobogenesis primitiva =

Scientific classification
- Domain: Eukaryota
- Kingdom: Animalia
- Phylum: Arthropoda
- Class: Insecta
- Order: Lepidoptera
- Family: Tortricidae
- Genus: Lobogenesis
- Species: L. primitiva

Binomial name
- Lobogenesis primitiva Razowski & Wojtusiak, 2009

Species of moth

Lobogenesis primitiva is a species of moth of the family Tortricidae. It is found in Ecuador in the provinces of Morona-Santiago and Napo.

The wingspan is 18.5 mm for males and 22.5 mm for females.
