= Gorytvesica sychnopina =

Scientific classification
- Kingdom: Animalia
- Phylum: Arthropoda
- Class: Insecta
- Order: Lepidoptera
- Family: Tortricidae
- Genus: Gorytvesica
- Species: G. sychnopina

Binomial name
- Gorytvesica sychnopina Razowski & Pelz, 2005

Species of moth

Gorytvesica sychnopina is a species of moth of the family Tortricidae. It is found in Ecuador in the provinces of Napo, Tungurahua and Morona-Santiago.

The wingspan is 16–18 mm for males and 19–20 mm for females.
