= Gorytvesica paraleipa =

Scientific classification
- Kingdom: Animalia
- Phylum: Arthropoda
- Class: Insecta
- Order: Lepidoptera
- Family: Tortricidae
- Genus: Gorytvesica
- Species: G. paraleipa

Binomial name
- Gorytvesica paraleipa Razowski & Pelz, 2005

Species of moth

Gorytvesica paraleipa is a species of moth of the family Tortricidae. It is found in Napo Province, Ecuador.

The moth's wingspan is 21–22.5 mm.
