= Senecio antisanae =

Conservation status
- Data Deficient (IUCN 3.1)

Scientific classification
- Kingdom: Plantae
- Clade: Tracheophytes
- Clade: Angiosperms
- Clade: Eudicots
- Clade: Asterids
- Order: Asterales
- Family: Asteraceae
- Genus: Senecio
- Species: S. antisanae

Binomial name
- Senecio antisanae Benth.
- Range by collection location

Species of flowering plant

Senecio antisanae is a species of Senecio in the aster family found only in the subtropical or tropical moist montane region of Ecuador. It is threatened by habitat loss.

It is a terrestrial herb that is only known from a few old collections in the Andes. The only subpopulation with detailed location information was recorded at the Hacienda del Isco, in the foothills of Volcán Antisana in the Cordillera of Quito, in 1845. This subpopulation may now be inside the Antisana Ecological Reserve, a privately owned reserve that preserves the native flora and fauna of the Northern Andean páramo. The species may be a synonym of S. iscoensis (Nordenstam in Jørgensen and León-Yánez 1999), which itself may be properly named Aetheolaena senecioides. No specimens of this species are housed in Ecuadorian museums.
