= El Chaco, Ecuador =

El Chaco
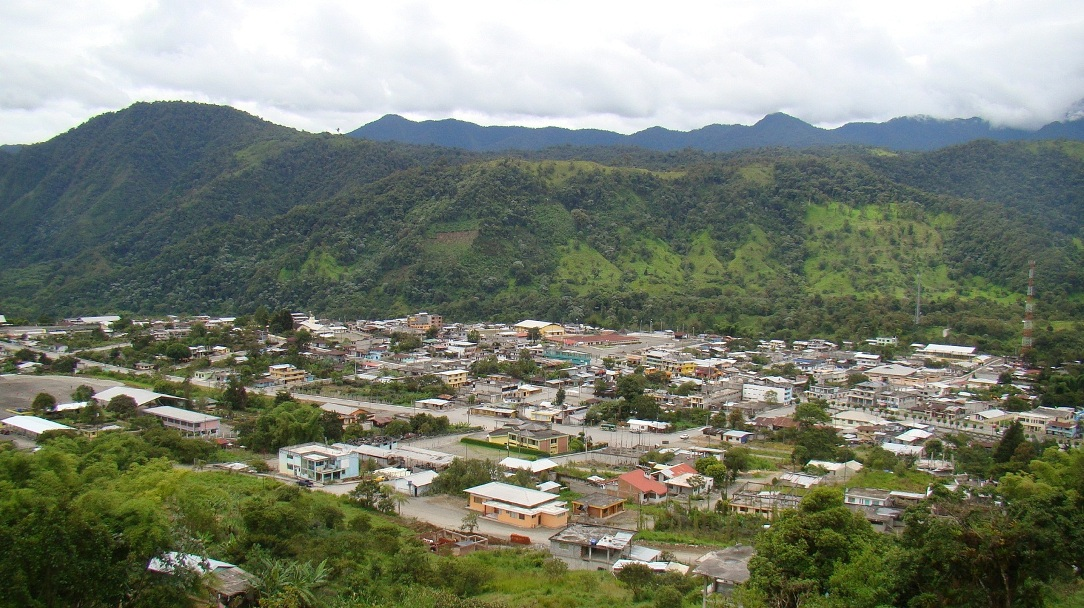

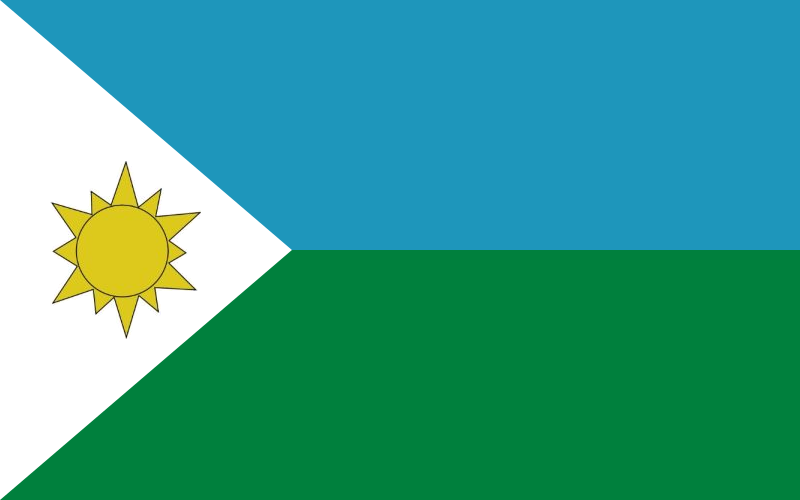
- Flag

- Location within Ecuador
- Coordinates: 0°20′25″S 77°48′32″W
- Country: Ecuador
- Province: Napo Province
- Canton: El Chaco Canton

Government
  - Mayor: Óscar Hernán De la Cruz Cahuatijo

Area
  - Total: 2.29 km^{2} (0.88 sq mi)

Population (2022 census)
  - Total: 4,353
  - Density: 1,900/km^{2} (4,920/sq mi)
- Time zone: ECT
- Climate: Af
- Website: gadmunicipalelchaco.gob.ec

El Chaco is a town located in the Napo Province, Ecuador. It is the seat of the El Chaco Canton.
