= Lobogenesis varnicosa =

Scientific classification
- Domain: Eukaryota
- Kingdom: Animalia
- Phylum: Arthropoda
- Class: Insecta
- Order: Lepidoptera
- Family: Tortricidae
- Genus: Lobogenesis
- Species: L. varnicosa

Binomial name
- Lobogenesis varnicosa Brown, 2000

Species of moth

Lobogenesis varnicosa is a species of moth of the family Tortricidae. It is found in Argentina.

The length of the forewings is 6.5-7.2 mm.
