= Lobogenesis trematerrae =

Scientific classification
- Domain: Eukaryota
- Kingdom: Animalia
- Phylum: Arthropoda
- Class: Insecta
- Order: Lepidoptera
- Family: Tortricidae
- Genus: Lobogenesis
- Species: L. trematerrae

Binomial name
- Lobogenesis trematerrae Razowski & Wojtusiak, 2011

Species of moth

Lobogenesis trematerrae is a species of moth of the family Tortricidae. It is found in the Western Cordillera of Colombia.

The wingspan is 16 mm.
