= Gorytvesica cidnozodion =

Scientific classification
- Domain: Eukaryota
- Kingdom: Animalia
- Phylum: Arthropoda
- Class: Insecta
- Order: Lepidoptera
- Family: Tortricidae
- Genus: Gorytvesica
- Species: G. cidnozodion

Binomial name
- Gorytvesica cidnozodion Razowski & Wojtusiak, 2006

Species of moth

Gorytvesica cidnozodion is a species of moth of the family Tortricidae. It is endemic to Ecuador (Morona-Santiago Province).

The wingspan is 16.5 millimetres (0.65 in).
