= Lobogenesis lobata =

Scientific classification
- Domain: Eukaryota
- Kingdom: Animalia
- Phylum: Arthropoda
- Class: Insecta
- Order: Lepidoptera
- Family: Tortricidae
- Genus: Lobogenesis
- Species: L. lobata

Binomial name
- Lobogenesis lobata Razowski, 1990

Species of moth

Lobogenesis lobata is a species of moth of the family Tortricidae. It is found in Costa Rica and Panama, but the Genera Lobogenesis is found in South America. Lobogenesis Lobata is very similar to L. larana and L. magdalenana, the only distinguishing character is the paired throns from the middle of the transtilla.

The length of the forewings is 5.5 mm for males and 5 mm for females.
