= Lobogenesis eretmognathos =

Scientific classification
- Kingdom: Animalia
- Phylum: Arthropoda
- Class: Insecta
- Order: Lepidoptera
- Family: Tortricidae
- Genus: Lobogenesis
- Species: L. eretmognathos

Binomial name
- Lobogenesis eretmognathos Razowski, 2005

Species of moth

Lobogenesis eretmognathos is a species of moth of the family Tortricidae. It is found in Pichincha Province, Ecuador.
