= Lobogenesis corymbovalva =

Scientific classification
- Domain: Eukaryota
- Kingdom: Animalia
- Phylum: Arthropoda
- Class: Insecta
- Order: Lepidoptera
- Family: Tortricidae
- Genus: Lobogenesis
- Species: L. corymbovalva

Binomial name
- Lobogenesis corymbovalva Razowski, 2005

Species of moth

Lobogenesis corymbovalva is a species of moth of the family Tortricidae. It is found in Azuay Province, Ecuador.
