= Lobogenesis larana =

Scientific classification
- Domain: Eukaryota
- Kingdom: Animalia
- Phylum: Arthropoda
- Class: Insecta
- Order: Lepidoptera
- Family: Tortricidae
- Genus: Lobogenesis
- Species: L. larana

Binomial name
- Lobogenesis larana Brown, 2000

Species of moth

Lobogenesis larana is a species of moth of the family Tortricidae. It is found in Venezuela. The habitat consists of cloud forests.

The length of the forewings is 5.2-5.8 mm for males and 6.5–7 mm for females.

== Etymology ==
The species name refers to the Venezuelan state of Lara.
