= Gorytvesica chara =

Scientific classification
- Domain: Eukaryota
- Kingdom: Animalia
- Phylum: Arthropoda
- Class: Insecta
- Order: Lepidoptera
- Family: Tortricidae
- Genus: Gorytvesica
- Species: G. chara

Binomial name
- Gorytvesica chara Razowski & Wojtusiak, 2006

Synonyms
- Bonagota chara

Species of moth

Gorytvesica chara is a species of moth of the family Tortricidae. It is endemic to Ecuador (Morona-Santiago Province).

The wingspan is 21.5 millimetres (0.85 in). The ground colour of the forewings is brown, with cream brown spots in the terminal area and along the dorsum. The hindwings are greyish brown, but cream costally.

== Etymology ==
The species name refers to the colouration of the markings and is derived from Greek chara (meaning nice).
