= Lobogenesis =

Scientific classification
- Kingdom: Animalia
- Phylum: Arthropoda
- Class: Insecta
- Order: Lepidoptera
- Family: Tortricidae
- Subfamily: Tortricinae
- Tribe: Euliini
- Genus: Lobogenesis; Razowski, 1990

Synonyms
- Pycnospina Razowski, 1997

Genus of tortrix moths

Lobogenesis is a genus of moths belonging to the subfamily Tortricinae of the family Tortricidae.

== Species ==
- Lobogenesis antiqua Brown, 2000
- Lobogenesis banosia Razowski, 2005
- Lobogenesis calamistrana Razowski, 2005
- Lobogenesis centrota (Razowski, 1997)
- Lobogenesis contrasta Brown, 2000
- Lobogenesis corymbovalva Razowski, 2005
- Lobogenesis eretmognathos Razowski, 2005
- Lobogenesis inserata Razowski, 2005
- Lobogenesis larana Brown, 2000
- Lobogenesis lobata Razowski, 1990
- Lobogenesis magdalenana Brown, 2000
- Lobogenesis pallidcypas Razowski, 2005
- Lobogenesis pectinata Razowski, 2005
- Lobogenesis penai Brown, 2000
- Lobogenesis peruviana Brown, 2000
- Lobogenesis phoxapex Razowski, 2005
- Lobogenesis polyspina Razowski, 2005
- Lobogenesis primitiva Razowski & Wojtusiak, 2009
- Lobogenesis riesteri Razowski & Pelz, 2003
- Lobogenesis sthernarcosta Razowski, 2005
- Lobogenesis trematerrae Razowski & Wojtusiak, 2011
- Lobogenesis varnicosa Brown, 2000

== See also ==
- List of Tortricidae genera
