= El Chaco Canton =

- Canton
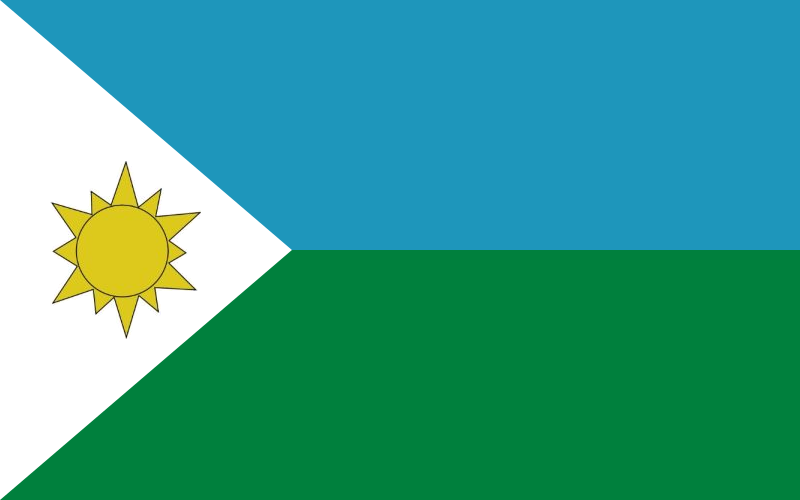
- Flag

- Location of Napo Province in Ecuador.

- Cantons of Napo Province
- Coordinates: 0°20′25″S 77°48′32″W
- Country: Ecuador
- Province: Napo Province
- Capital: El Chaco

Area
  - Total: 3,476 km^{2} (1,342 sq mi)

Population (2022 census)
  - Total: 9,252
  - Density: 2.662/km^{2} (6.894/sq mi)
- Time zone: UTC-5 (ECT)

El Chaco Canton is a canton of Ecuador, located in the Napo Province. Its capital is the town of El Chaco. Its population at the 2001 census was 6,133.
