= Gorytvesica medeter =

Scientific classification
- Kingdom: Animalia
- Phylum: Arthropoda
- Class: Insecta
- Order: Lepidoptera
- Family: Tortricidae
- Genus: Gorytvesica
- Species: G. medeter

Binomial name
- Gorytvesica medeter Razowski & Pelz, 2005

Species of moth

Gorytvesica medeter is a species of moth of the family Tortricidae. It is found in Pichincha Province, Ecuador.

The wingspan is 18.5 mm.
