= Gorytvesica homaema =

Scientific classification
- Kingdom: Animalia
- Phylum: Arthropoda
- Class: Insecta
- Order: Lepidoptera
- Family: Tortricidae
- Genus: Gorytvesica
- Species: G. homaema

Binomial name
- Gorytvesica homaema Razowski & Pelz, 2005

Species of moth

Gorytvesica homaema is a species of moth of the family Tortricidae.
