= Lobogenesis centrota =

Scientific classification
- Domain: Eukaryota
- Kingdom: Animalia
- Phylum: Arthropoda
- Class: Insecta
- Order: Lepidoptera
- Family: Tortricidae
- Genus: Lobogenesis
- Species: L. centrota

Binomial name
- Lobogenesis centrota (Razowski, 1997)

Synonyms
- Pycnospina centrota Razowski, 1997

Species of moth

Lobogenesis centrota is a species of moth of the family Tortricidae. It is found in Peru.
