= Gorytvesica cerussolinea =

Scientific classification
- Domain: Eukaryota
- Kingdom: Animalia
- Phylum: Arthropoda
- Class: Insecta
- Order: Lepidoptera
- Family: Tortricidae
- Genus: Gorytvesica
- Species: G. cerussolinea

Binomial name
- Gorytvesica cerussolinea Razowski & Wojtusiak, 2006

Synonyms
- Bonagota cerussolinea

Species of moth

Gorytvesica cerussolinea is a species of moth of the family Tortricidae. It is endemic to Ecuador (Morona-Santiago Province).

The wingspan is 23 millimetres (0.91 in).
