= Gorytvesica =

Scientific classification
- Kingdom: Animalia
- Phylum: Arthropoda
- Class: Insecta
- Order: Lepidoptera
- Family: Tortricidae
- Tribe: Euliini
- Genus: Gorytvesica; Razowski, 1997

Genus of tortrix moths

Gorytvesica is a genus of moths belonging to the family Tortricidae.

== Species ==
- Gorytvesica cerussolinea (Razowski & Wojtusiak, 2006)
- Gorytvesica chara (Razowski & Wojtusiak, 2006)
- Gorytvesica cidnozodion Razowski & Wojtusiak, 2006
- Gorytvesica cosangana Razowski & Pelz, 2005
- Gorytvesica decumana Razowski, 1997
- Gorytvesica derelicta Razowski & Becker, 2002
- Gorytvesica ebenoptera Razowski & Pelz, 2005
- Gorytvesica fustigera Razowski & Pelz, 2005
- Gorytvesica gorytodes Razowski, 1997
- Gorytvesica homaema Razowski & Pelz, 2005
- Gorytvesica homora Razowski & Pelz, 2005
- Gorytvesica medeter Razowski & Pelz, 2005
- Gorytvesica paraleipa Razowski & Pelz, 2005
- Gorytvesica sachatamiae Razowski & Pelz, 2005
- Gorytvesica sychnopina Razowski & Pelz, 2005
- Gorytvesica tenera Razowski & Pelz, 2005

== See also ==
- List of Tortricidae genera
