= Lobogenesis banosia =

Scientific classification
- Domain: Eukaryota
- Kingdom: Animalia
- Phylum: Arthropoda
- Class: Insecta
- Order: Lepidoptera
- Family: Tortricidae
- Genus: Lobogenesis
- Species: L. banosia

Binomial name
- Lobogenesis banosia Razowski, 2005

Species of moth

Lobogenesis banosia is a species of moth of the family Tortricidae. It is found in Tungurahua Province, Ecuador.
