= Gorytvesica derelicta =

Scientific classification
- Kingdom: Animalia
- Phylum: Arthropoda
- Clade: Pancrustacea
- Class: Insecta
- Order: Lepidoptera
- Family: Tortricidae
- Genus: Gorytvesica
- Species: G. derelicta

Binomial name
- Gorytvesica derelicta Razowski & Becker, 2002

Species of moth

Gorytvesica derelicta is a species of moth of the family Tortricidae. It is endemic to Ecuador (Loja Province).

Adults are sexually dimorphic.
