= Lobogenesis magdalenana =

Scientific classification
- Domain: Eukaryota
- Kingdom: Animalia
- Phylum: Arthropoda
- Class: Insecta
- Order: Lepidoptera
- Family: Tortricidae
- Genus: Lobogenesis
- Species: L. magdalenana

Binomial name
- Lobogenesis magdalenana Brown, 2000

Species of moth

Lobogenesis magdalenana is a species of moth of the family Tortricidae. It is found in Colombia and Venezuela. The habitat consists of cloud forests.

The length of the forewings is 5 mm for males and 5.1–6.5 mm for females.

== Etymology ==
The species name refers to the province of Magdalena.
