= Gorytvesica sachatamiae =

Scientific classification
- Kingdom: Animalia
- Phylum: Arthropoda
- Class: Insecta
- Order: Lepidoptera
- Family: Tortricidae
- Genus: Gorytvesica
- Species: G. sachatamiae

Binomial name
- Gorytvesica sachatamiae Razowski & Pelz, 2005

Species of moth

Gorytvesica sachatamiae is a species of moth of the family Tortricidae. It is found in Pichincha Province, Ecuador.

The wingspan is 13.5-14.5 mm for males and 16.5 mm females.

== Etymology ==
The species name refers to the collecting locality, Sachatamia near Mindo.
