= Gorytvesica decumana =

Scientific classification
- Domain: Eukaryota
- Kingdom: Animalia
- Phylum: Arthropoda
- Class: Insecta
- Order: Lepidoptera
- Family: Tortricidae
- Genus: Gorytvesica
- Species: G. decumana

Binomial name
- Gorytvesica decumana Razowski, 1997

Species of moth

Gorytvesica decumana is a species of moth of the family Tortricidae. It is found in Peru.
