= Gorytvesica ebenoptera =

Scientific classification
- Kingdom: Animalia
- Phylum: Arthropoda
- Class: Insecta
- Order: Lepidoptera
- Family: Tortricidae
- Genus: Gorytvesica
- Species: G. ebenoptera

Binomial name
- Gorytvesica ebenoptera Razowski & Pelz, 2005

Species of moth

Gorytvesica ebenoptera is a species of moth of the family Tortricidae. It is found in Morona-Santiago Province, Ecuador.

The wingspan is 14.5 mm for males and 17 mm for females.
