= Lobogenesis antiqua =

Scientific classification
- Domain: Eukaryota
- Kingdom: Animalia
- Phylum: Arthropoda
- Class: Insecta
- Order: Lepidoptera
- Family: Tortricidae
- Genus: Lobogenesis
- Species: L. antiqua

Binomial name
- Lobogenesis antiqua Brown, 2000

Species of moth

Lobogenesis antiqua is a species of moth of the family Tortricidae. It is found in Bolivia.

The length of the forewings is 7.8 mm.
