= Lobogenesis peruviana =

Scientific classification
- Domain: Eukaryota
- Kingdom: Animalia
- Phylum: Arthropoda
- Class: Insecta
- Order: Lepidoptera
- Family: Tortricidae
- Genus: Lobogenesis
- Species: L. peruviana

Binomial name
- Lobogenesis peruviana Brown, 2000

Species of moth

Lobogenesis peruviana is a species of moth of the family Tortricidae. It is found in Peru.

== Description ==
The length of the fore-wings is 7.5 mm for males and 8 mm for females.
