= Lobogenesis penai =

Scientific classification
- Domain: Eukaryota
- Kingdom: Animalia
- Phylum: Arthropoda
- Class: Insecta
- Order: Lepidoptera
- Family: Tortricidae
- Genus: Lobogenesis
- Species: L. penai

Binomial name
- Lobogenesis penai Brown, 2000

Species of insect

Lobogenesis penai is a species of moth of the family Tortricidae. It is found in Bolivia. The habitat consists of tropical cloud forests.

The length of the forewings is 6.8 mm.
