= Tena, Ecuador =

Tena
- City
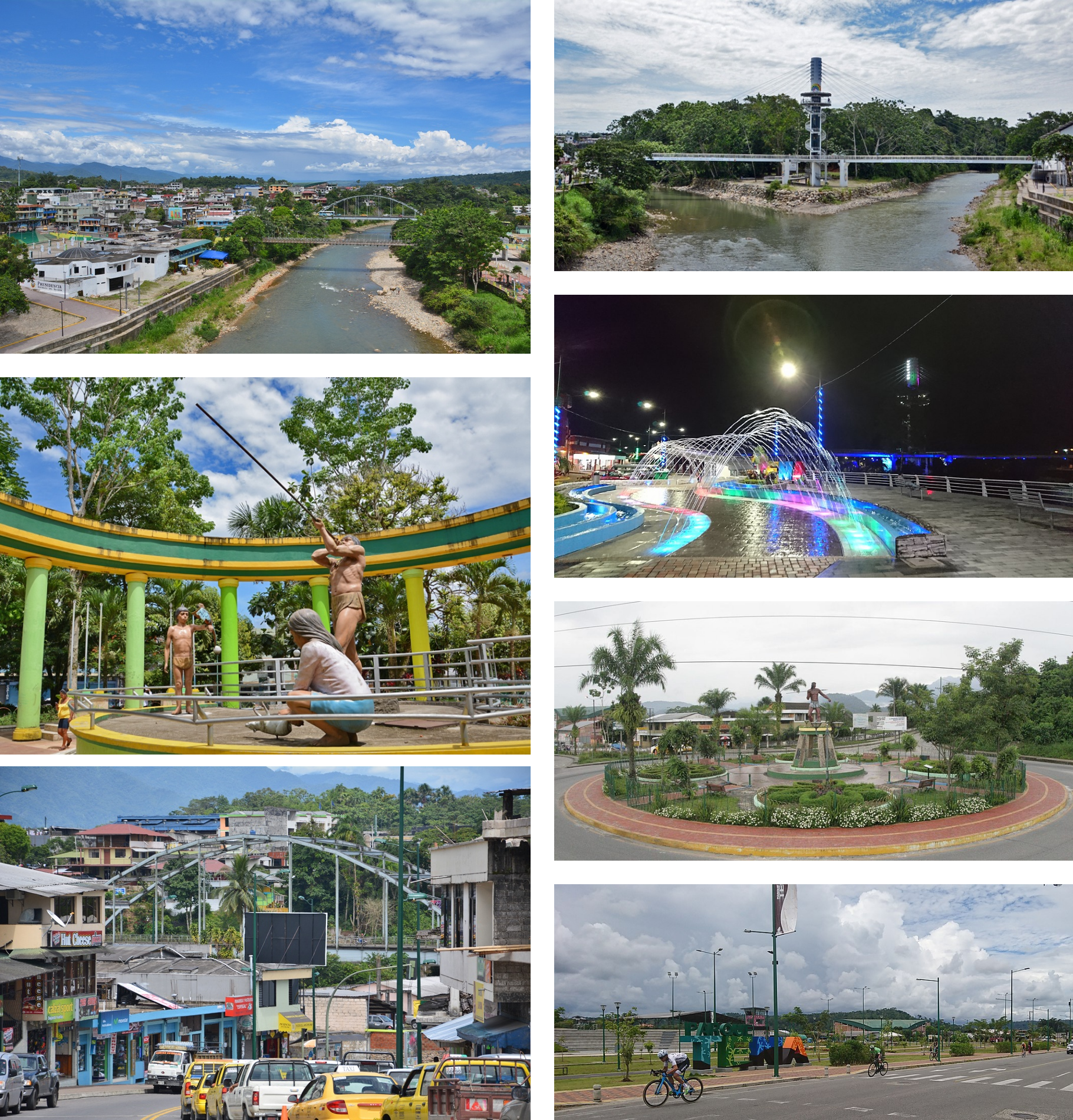
- From top, left to right: View of the city center and the Tena River, cable-stayed bridge of the Amazon Park The Island, night view of the Boardwalk, monument to the Quichua ethnic group, monument to Jumandy, November 15 avenue and Tena Park.
- Nickname: Cinnamon Capital
- Location within Ecuador
- Coordinates: 0.9890°S 77.8159°W
- Country: Ecuador
- Province: Napo
- Canton: Tena
- Founded: 1560

Area
  - City: 7.42 km^{2} (2.86 sq mi)
- Elevation: 598 m (1,962 ft)

Population (2022 census)
  - City: 29,724
  - Density: 4,010/km^{2} (10,400/sq mi)
- Demonym: Tenense (spanish)
- Time zone: UTC-5 (ECT)
- Area code: (+593) 6
- Climate: Af
- Website: www.tena.gob.ec (in Spanish)

Tena (Spanish pronunciation: [ˈtena]) is a city in the Amazon rainforest of Ecuador. It is the seat of Tena Canton, as well as the capital and largest city of Napo Province. Tena is located approximately 195 kilometers from Quito, the capital of Ecuador.

== History ==
Tena is one of several Ecuadorian cities founded by Gil Ramírez Dávalos, a Spanish explorer and conquistador. Dávalos — who served as Governor of Quito from 1556 until 1559 — also founded the cities of Cuenca (1557), Baeza (1560) and Azogues (1562).

== Geography ==
At the confluence of the Tena and Pano rivers in the center of town is located the Parque Amazónico La Isla with a pedestrian bridge, el Puente Espiral. At this point the rivers become the Tena River, which soon joins with the Misahualli and eventually flows into the Napo River. From this point, the Napo — which is the 11th largest tributary to the Amazon River in terms of inflow — winds its way east into Peru.

=== Climate ===
Tena is located in the rainforest, 520 metres or 1,710 feet above sea level. There is rainfall year-round, with an annual average of 4,900 millimetres or 190 inches.

Climate data for Tena, elevation 527 m (1,729 ft), (1971–2000)
Month	Jan	Feb	Mar	Apr	May	Jun	Jul	Aug	Sep	Oct	Nov	Dec	Year
Mean daily maximum °C (°F)	28.5 (83.3)	28.3 (82.9)	28.3 (82.9)	27.9 (82.2)	27.6 (81.7)	27.2 (81.0)	27.4 (81.3)	28.5 (83.3)	29.3 (84.7)	29.1 (84.4)	28.7 (83.7)	29.1 (84.4)	28.3 (83.0)
Mean daily minimum °C (°F)	18.6 (65.5)	18.3 (64.9)	18.3 (64.9)	18.2 (64.8)	18.4 (65.1)	18.0 (64.4)	17.8 (64.0)	17.9 (64.2)	18.5 (65.3)	18.6 (65.5)	18.6 (65.5)	18.5 (65.3)	18.3 (65.0)
Average rainfall mm (inches)	323.0 (12.72)	293.0 (11.54)	389.0 (15.31)	500.0 (19.69)	477.0 (18.78)	531.0 (20.91)	498.0 (19.61)	339.0 (13.35)	379.0 (14.92)	435.0 (17.13)	377.0 (14.84)	335.0 (13.19)	4,876 (191.99)
Average relative humidity (%)	88	87	88	90	88	93	89	88	86	87	87	86	88
Source: FAO

== Tourism ==
Tena is known for the rainforest and rivers that surround the town, and it is popular with tourists. Many inexpensive hotels, tourist agencies, and restaurants cater to backpacker tourism. Tena is surrounded by forested hills and is located at the edge of the Andes, which are visible to the west.

The jungle rivers on the Amazon side of the Andes are bigger and have more consistent flows than their west-Andean counterparts, and for this reason Tena has become a popular launching point for jungle, kayaking and rafting tours in Ecuador's Amazon rainforest region. The entry to the city is marked by a statue of the indigenous hero Jumandy, who led an uprising against the Spanish colonizers in 1578 and was subsequently executed.

Tena and its surrounding indigenous communities are also bases for many volunteers working for reforestation projects, with community support in development initiatives in diverse, and connected areas such as, ecotourism and capacity building. The indigenous populations of Ecuador are some of the most politically organized in Latin America, and Tena houses two major confederations, Fenakin (Federación de Organizaciones de la Nacionalidad Kichwa de Napo) and Ashin (Asociación de Shamanes Indígenas de Napo); one of the major stand-offs during the 2001 indigenous uprising in Ecuador, took place here.

Oil prospecting is a point of contention here, as there is drilling of the 250-square-mile (650 km^{2}) Pungarayacu heavy oil field by Canadian corporation Ivanhoe. Illegal sand and mineral mining, such as for gold, near and within Napo's rivers is also a huge concern for many of Tena's inhabitants.

== Transportation ==
The road from Quito to Tena is 99% paved as of 2021. It includes a spectacular passage over Papallacta Pass, above 4,000 m elevation, as well as views of several waterfalls. On clear days the 3,990 m Sumaco volcano can be seen to the east. There is bus service to Tena via Baeza which takes about 4 hours, and private transport from Quito takes about 3 to 3.5 hours. Small yellow truck-taxis are abundant in the city and cost $1.25.

Around the time of the discovery of oil in the province, Mayor Galo de la Torre Airport was constructed to serve Tena. It closed in 2011. A new airport, Jumandy Airport located 27 km (17 mi) to the east near Ahuano, was inaugurated in 2011. The only airline that served it, TAME, ended flights to Tena in January 2016 citing low passenger loads.

== See also ==
- Oriente (Ecuador)
- Shandia

== Gallery ==
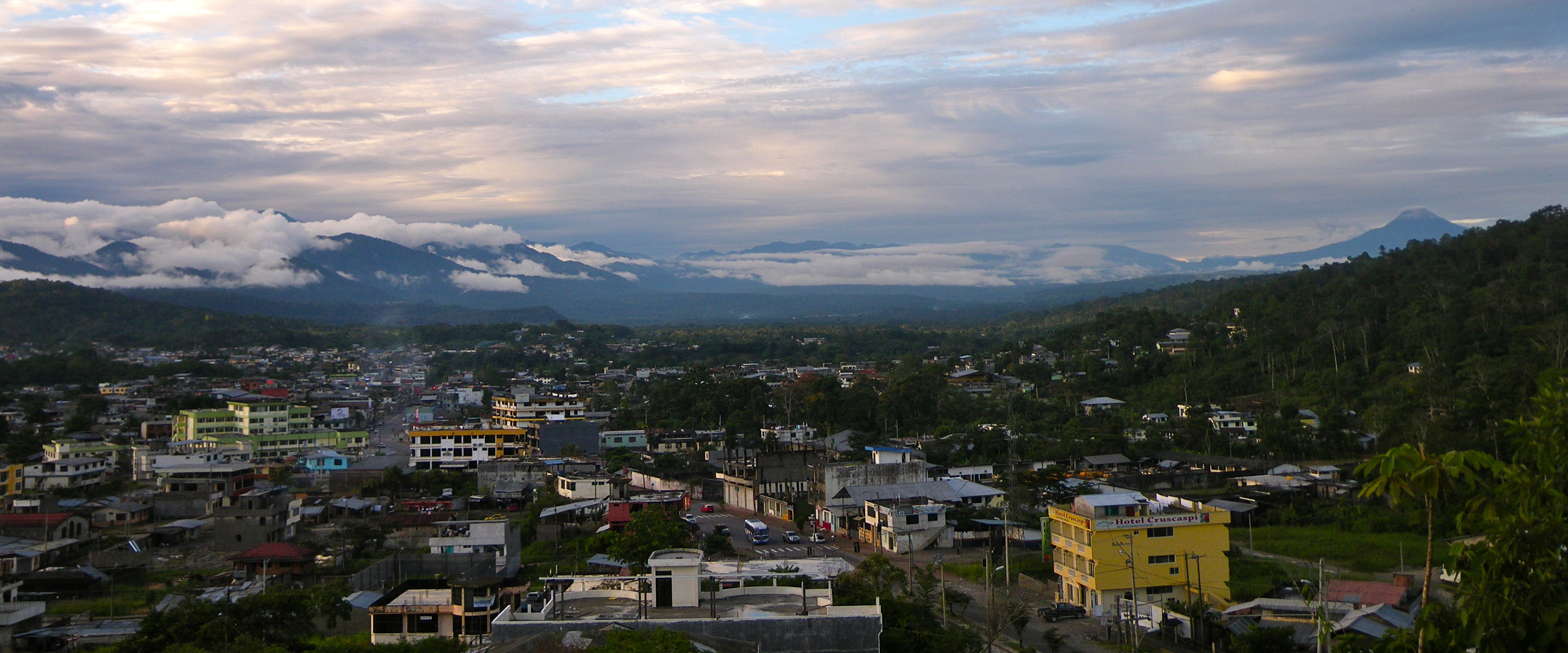
Tena (2011)

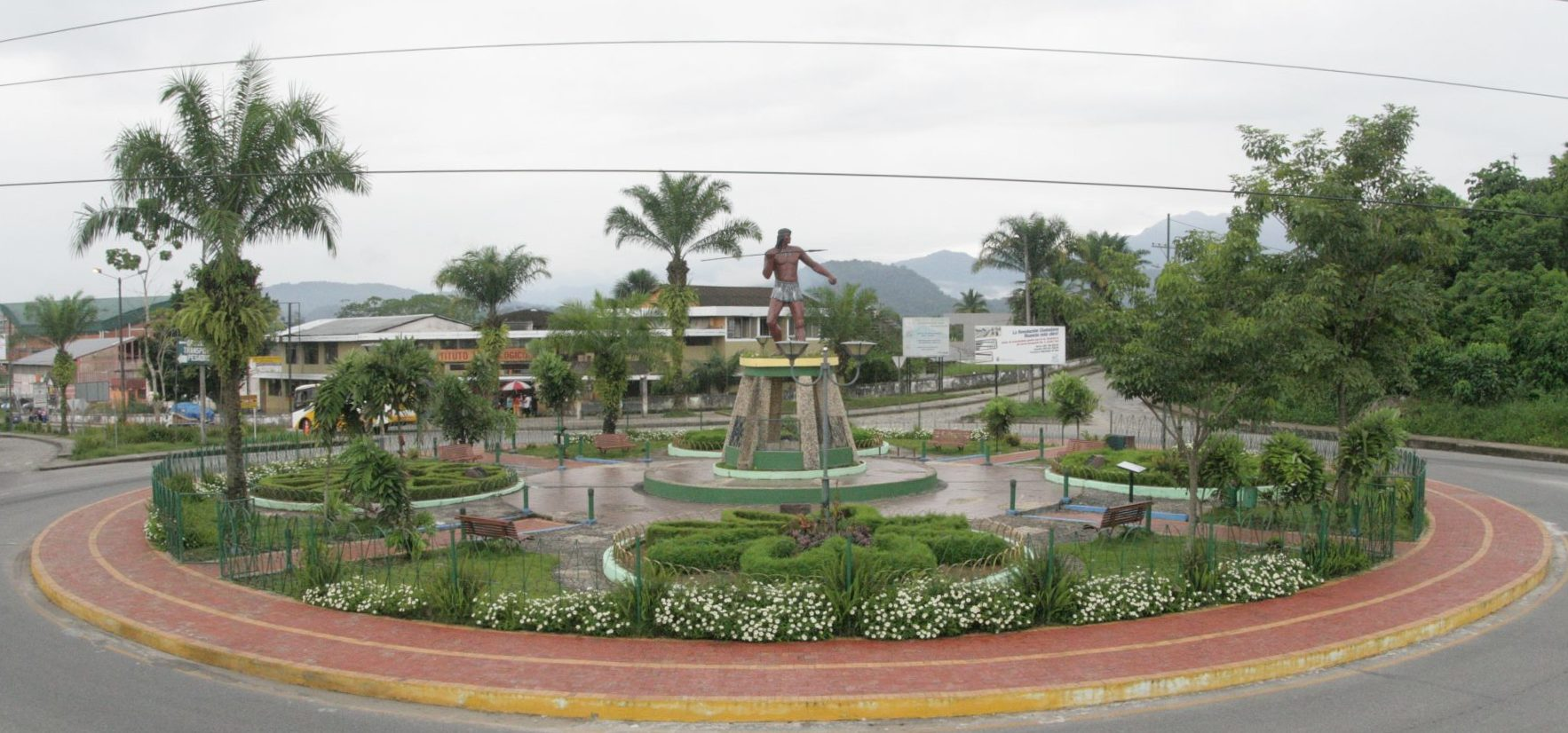
statue of Jumandy, at rotary located on Ecuador Highway 45 at the entrance to the city

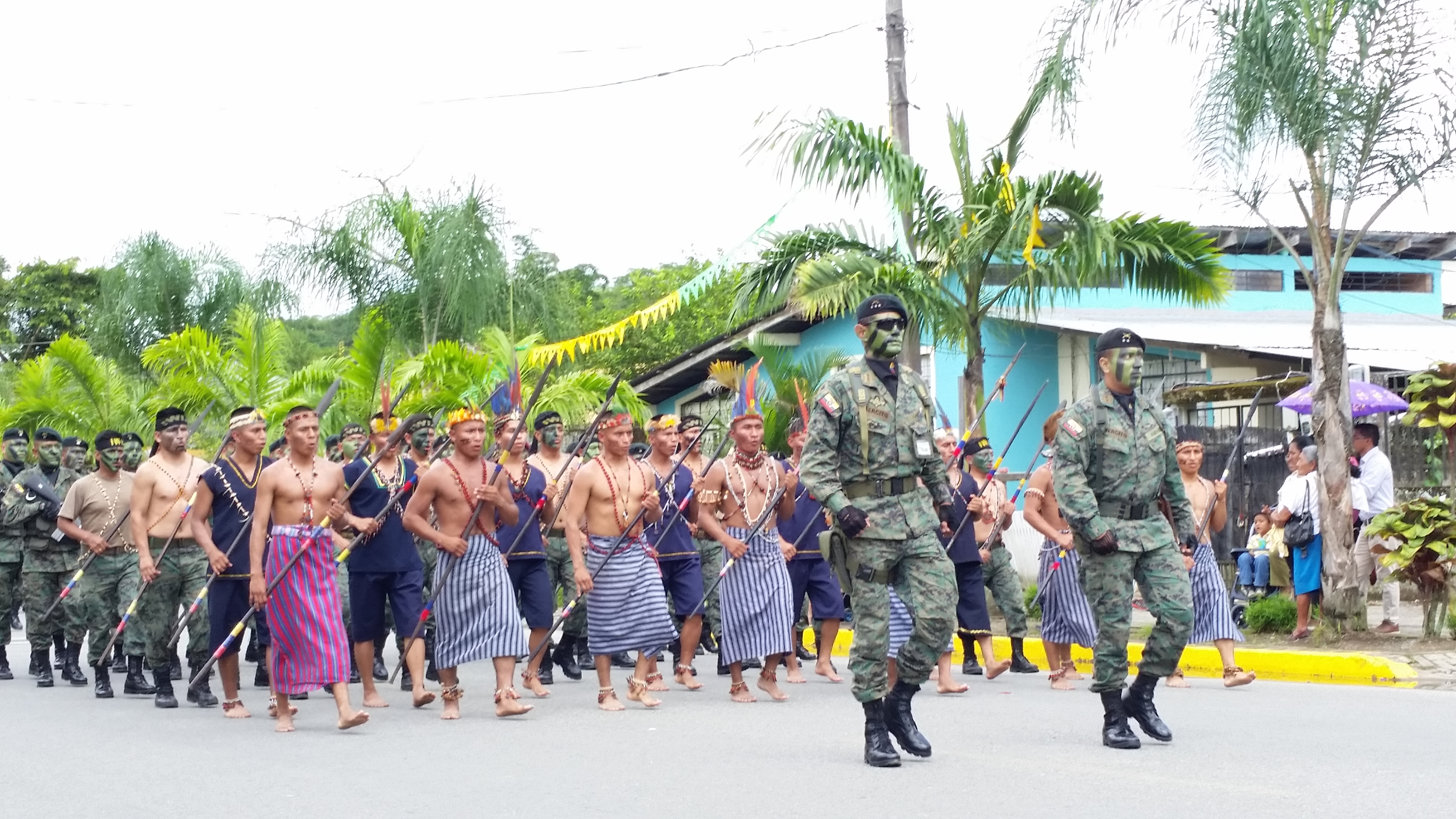
Soldiers of the Jungle Commands Group parading in Tena

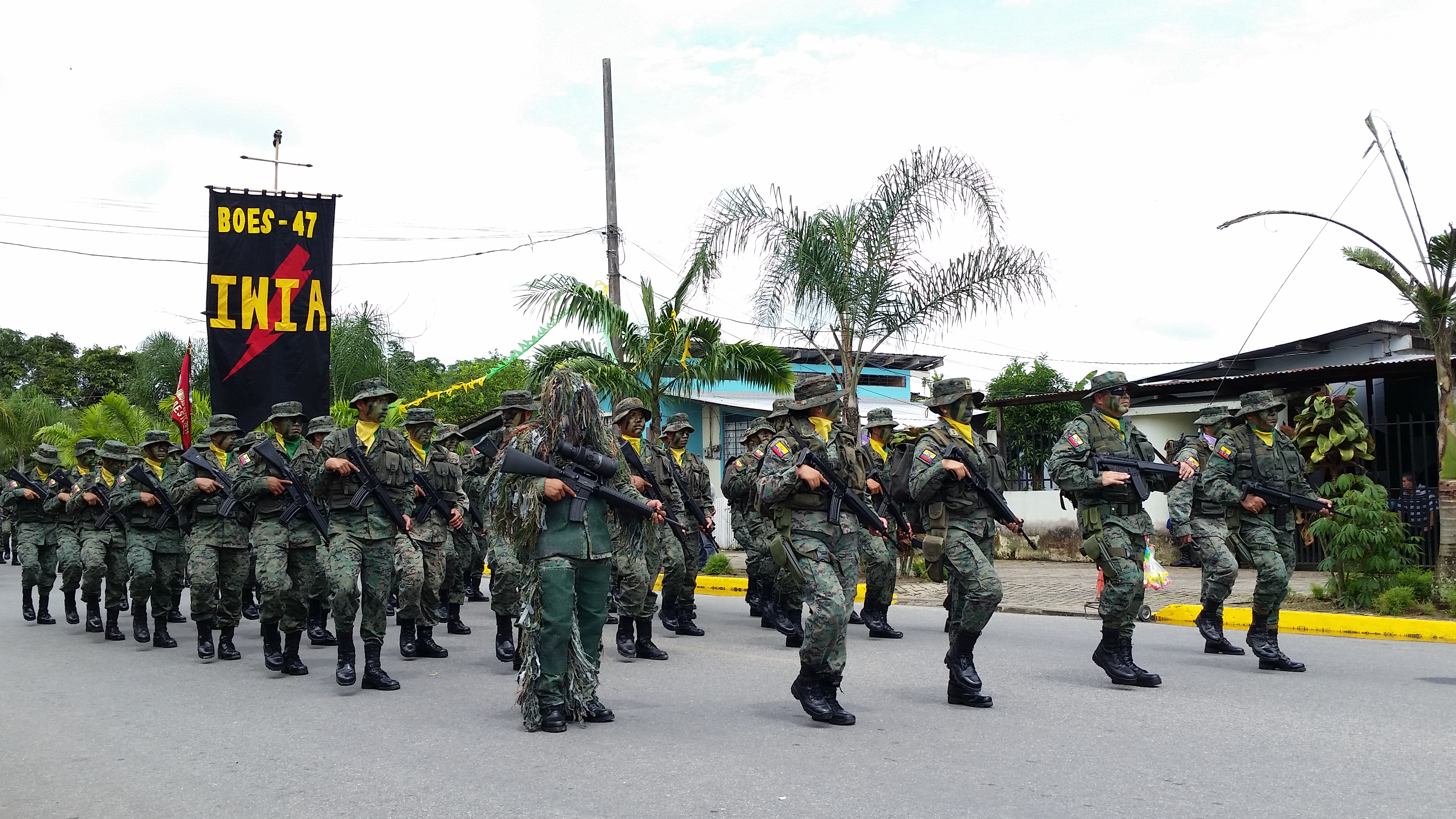
Soldiers of the Jungle Commands Group parading in Tena

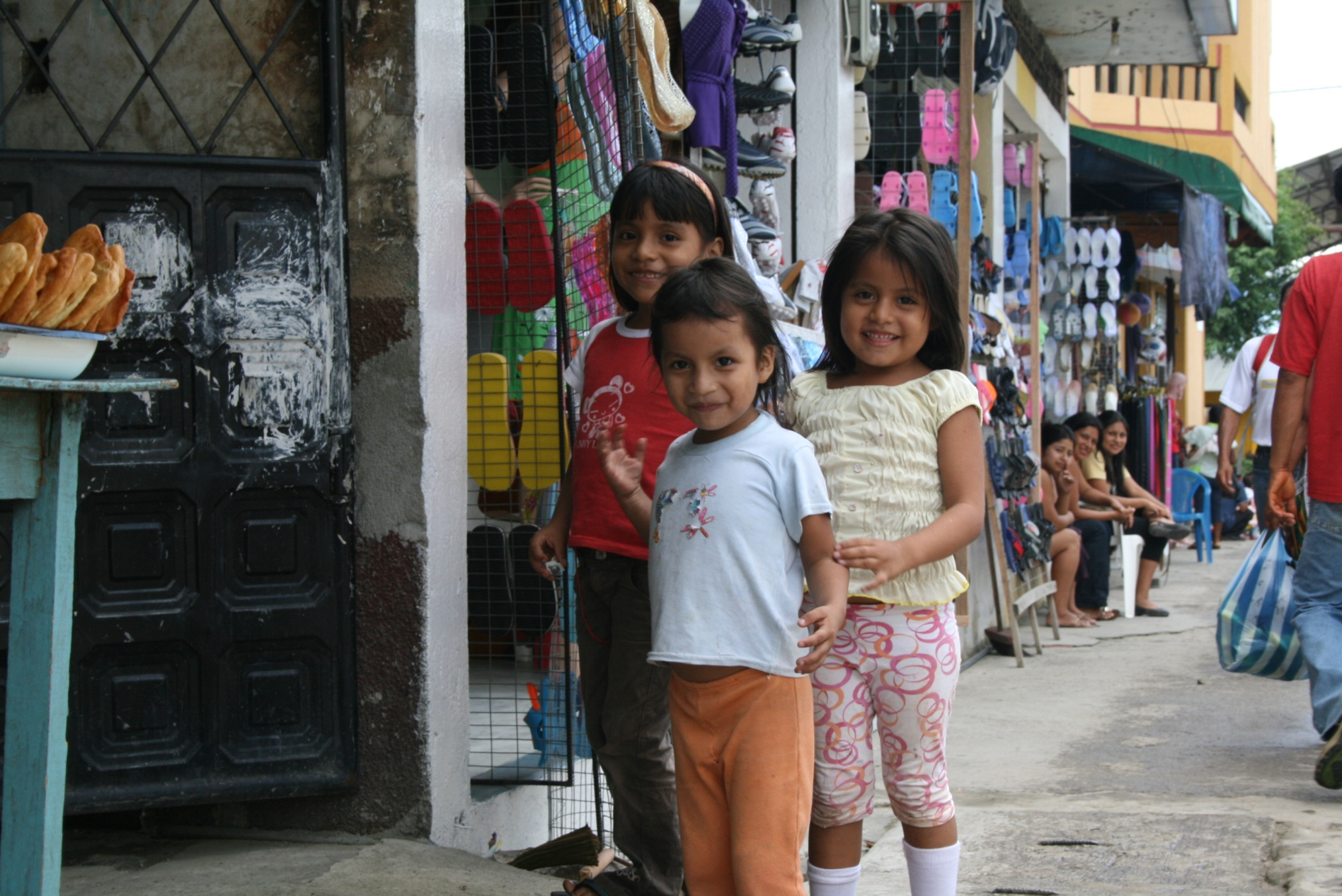
Local children

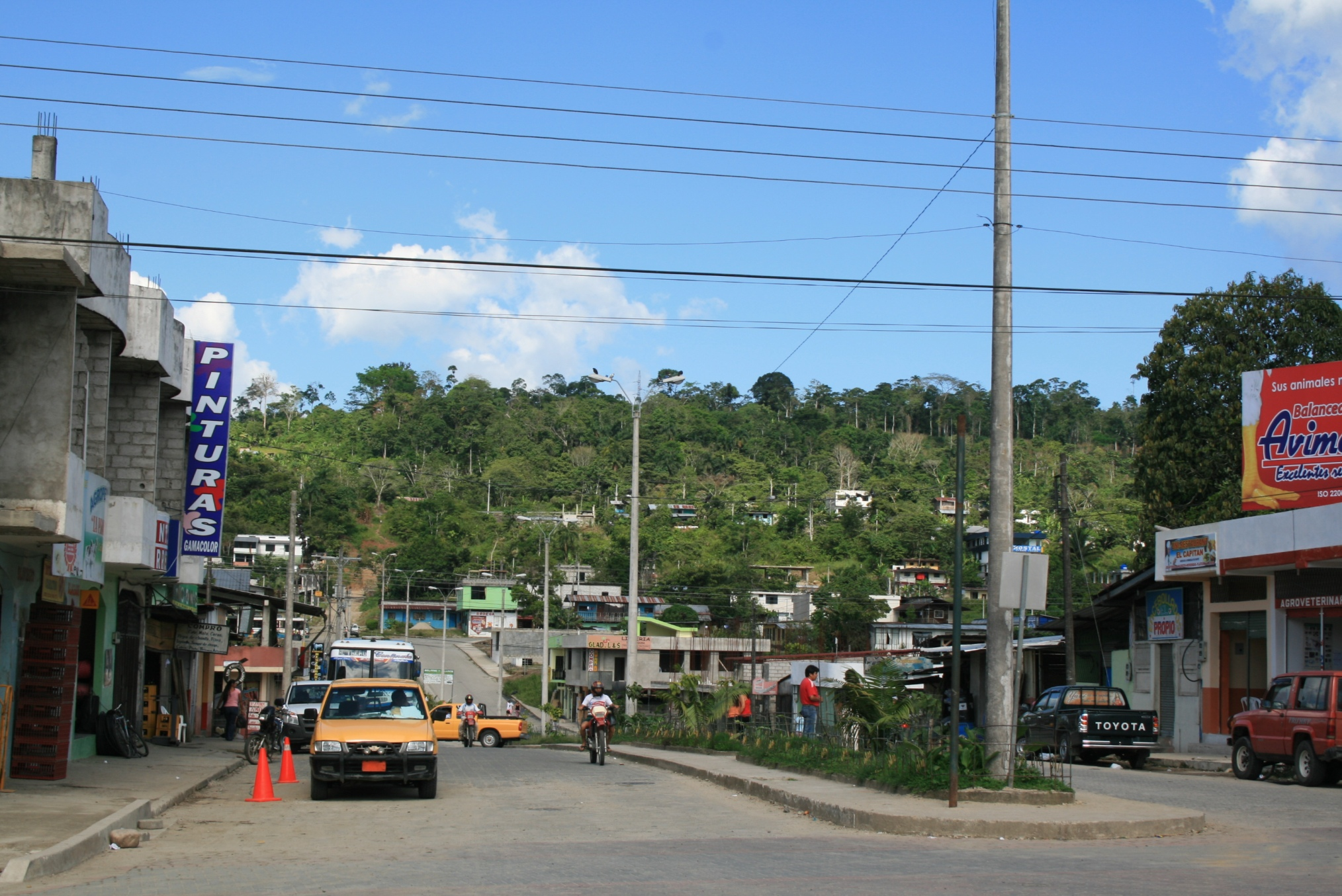
Street in Tena (2009)

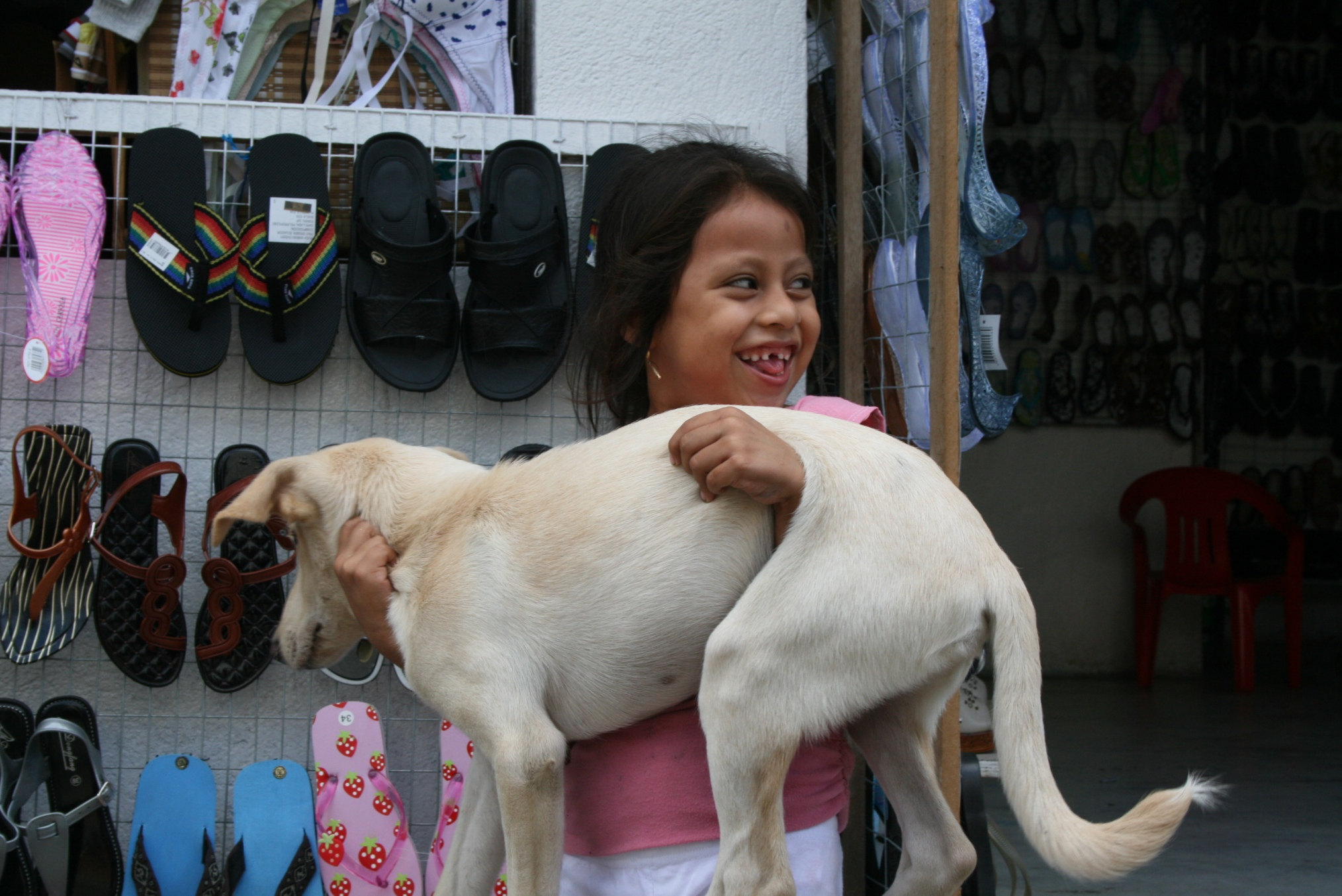
Child with dog
