= Carlos Julio Arosemena Tola, Ecuador =

Carlos Julio Arosemena Tola
- Location within Ecuador
- Coordinates: 1°10′S 77°51′W
- Country: Ecuador
- Province: Napo Province
- Canton: Carlos Julio Arosemena Tola Canton

Government
  - Mayor: Luis Rodrigo Caiza Curipallo

Area
  - Total: 0.61 km^{2} (0.24 sq mi)

Population (2022 census)
  - Total: 1,273
  - Density: 2,100/km^{2} (5,400/sq mi)
- Time zone: ECT
- Climate: Af

Carlos Julio Arosemena Tola is a location in the Napo Province, Ecuador. It is the seat of the Carlos Julio Arosemena Tola Canton.

== See also ==
- Carlos Julio Arosemena Tola
