= Archidona Canton =

- Canton
- Flag

- Location of Napo Province in Ecuador.

- Cantons of Napo Province
- Coordinates: 0°55′S 77°47′W
- Country: Ecuador
- Province: Napo Province
- Capital: Archidona

Area
  - Total: 3,051 km^{2} (1,178 sq mi)

Population (2022 census)
  - Total: 30,488
  - Density: 9.993/km^{2} (25.88/sq mi)
- Time zone: UTC-5 (ECT)

Archidona Canton is a canton of Ecuador located in the Napo Province, with its capital in the town of Archidona. Its population at the 2001 census was 18,551.
