= Tena Canton =

- Canton
- Location of Napo Province in Ecuador.

- Cantons of Napo Province
- Coordinates: 0.9890°S 77.8159°W
- Country: Ecuador
- Province: Napo Province
- Capital: Tena

Area
  - Total: 3,899 km^{2} (1,505 sq mi)

Population (2022 census)
  - Total: 80,816
  - Density: 20.73/km^{2} (53.68/sq mi)
- Time zone: UTC-5 (ECT)

Tena Canton is a canton of Ecuador, in the Napo Province. Its capital is the town of Tena. Its population at the 2001 census was 46,007.
