= Quijos Canton =

- Canton
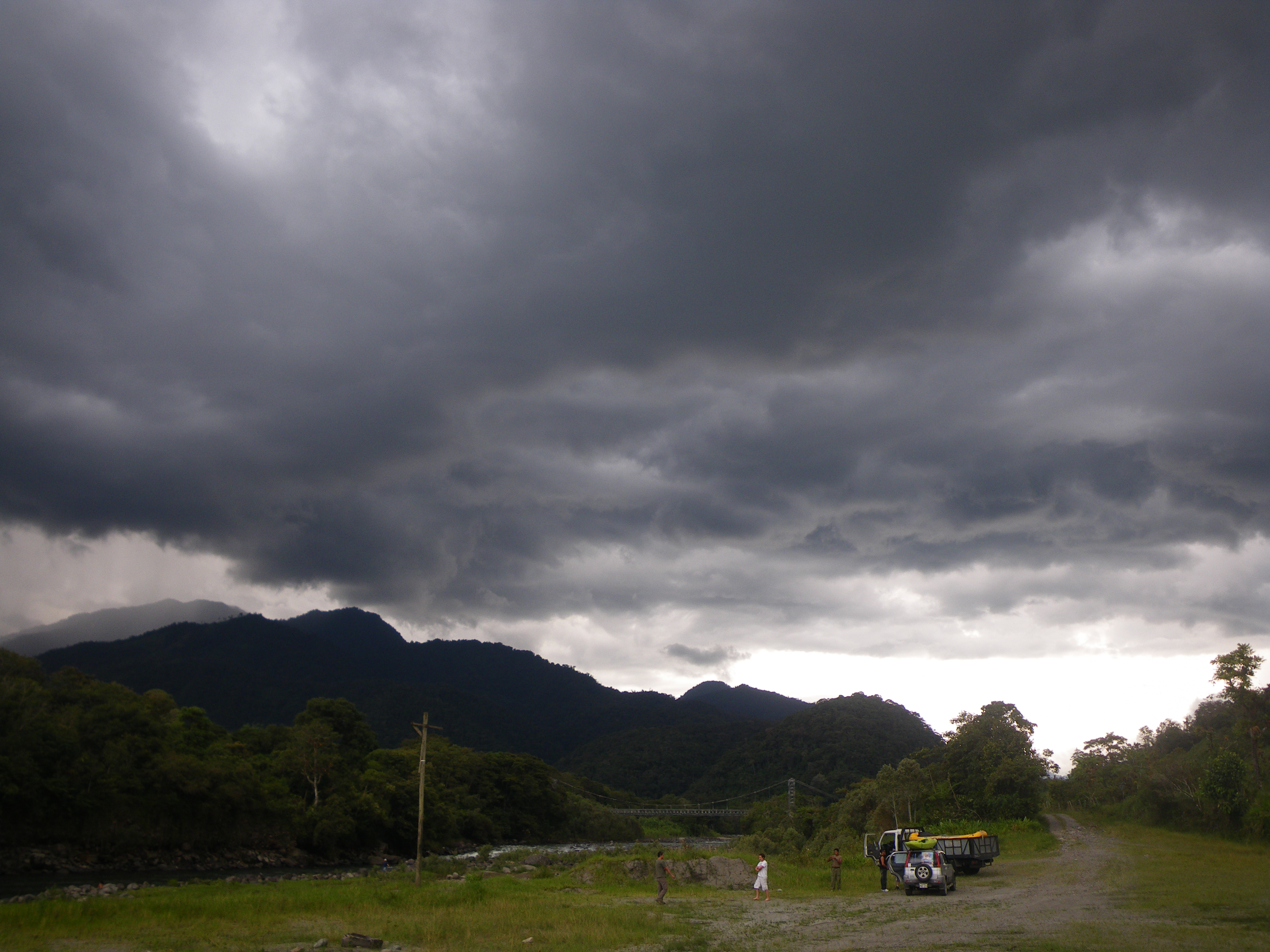
- The Baeza area receives impressive thunderstorms throughout the year.

- Location of Napo Province in Ecuador.

- Cantons of Napo Province
- Coordinates: 0°27′53″S 77°53′29″W
- Country: Ecuador
- Province: Napo Province
- Capital: Baeza

Area
  - Total: 1,588 km^{2} (613 sq mi)

Population (2022 census)
  - Total: 6,472
  - Density: 4.076/km^{2} (10.56/sq mi)
- Time zone: UTC-5 (ECT)

Quijos Canton is a canton of Ecuador located in the Napo Province. Its seat is the town of Baeza. It includes the village of Chalpi. Its population at the 2001 census was 5,505.
