= Carlos Julio Arosemena Tola Canton =

- Canton
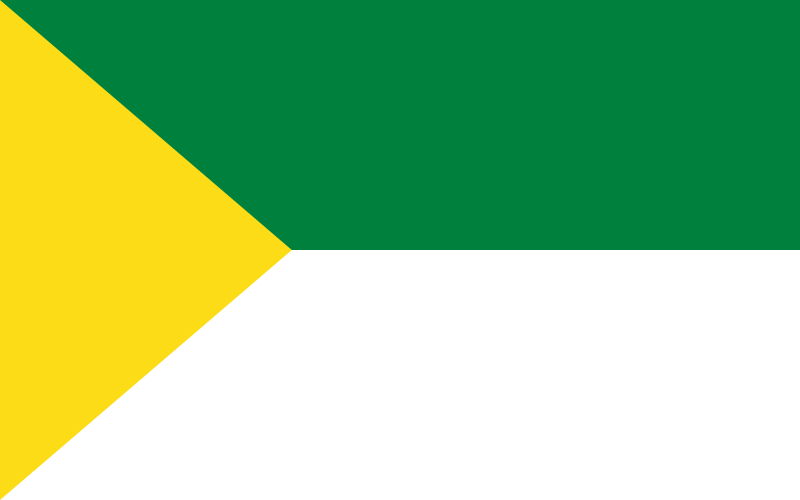
- Flag

- Location of Napo Province in Ecuador.

- Cantons of Napo Province
- Coordinates: 1°10′S 77°51′W
- Country: Ecuador
- Province: Napo Province
- Capital: Carlos Julio Arosemena Tola

Area
  - Total: 499.6 km^{2} (192.9 sq mi)

Population (2022 census)
  - Total: 4,647
  - Density: 9.301/km^{2} (24.09/sq mi)
- Time zone: UTC-5 (ECT)

Carlos Julio Arosemena Tola Canton is a canton of Ecuador, located in the Napo Province. Its capital is the town of Carlos Julio Arosemena Tola. Its population at the 2001 census was 2,943.
