= Senecio iscoensis =

Conservation status
- Data Deficient (IUCN 3.1)

Scientific classification
- Kingdom: Plantae
- Clade: Tracheophytes
- Clade: Angiosperms
- Clade: Eudicots
- Clade: Asterids
- Order: Asterales
- Family: Asteraceae
- Genus: Senecio
- Species: S. iscoensis

Binomial name
- Senecio iscoensis Hieron.
- Range of collection material

Synonyms
- Senecio decolor Benoist.

Species of flowering plant

Senecio iscoensis or Aetheolaena senecioides is a flowering plant in the aster family. It is found only in subtropical and tropical dry shrubland in Ecuador. It is threatened by habitat loss.

It is known from three collections in the central and northern Andes. First recorded by Luis Sodiro, probably at the Hacienda Isco, it is also recorded from the foothills of Volcán Antisana and probably inside the reserve of the Antisana Ecological Reserve, a privately owned reserve that preserves the native flora and fauna of the Northern Andean páramo.

== Distribution ==
Neotropic:

Western South America: Ecuador (Pichincha, Imbabura, Cotopaxi, Cañar)
