= Justo Arosemena Lacayo =

Colombian sculptor

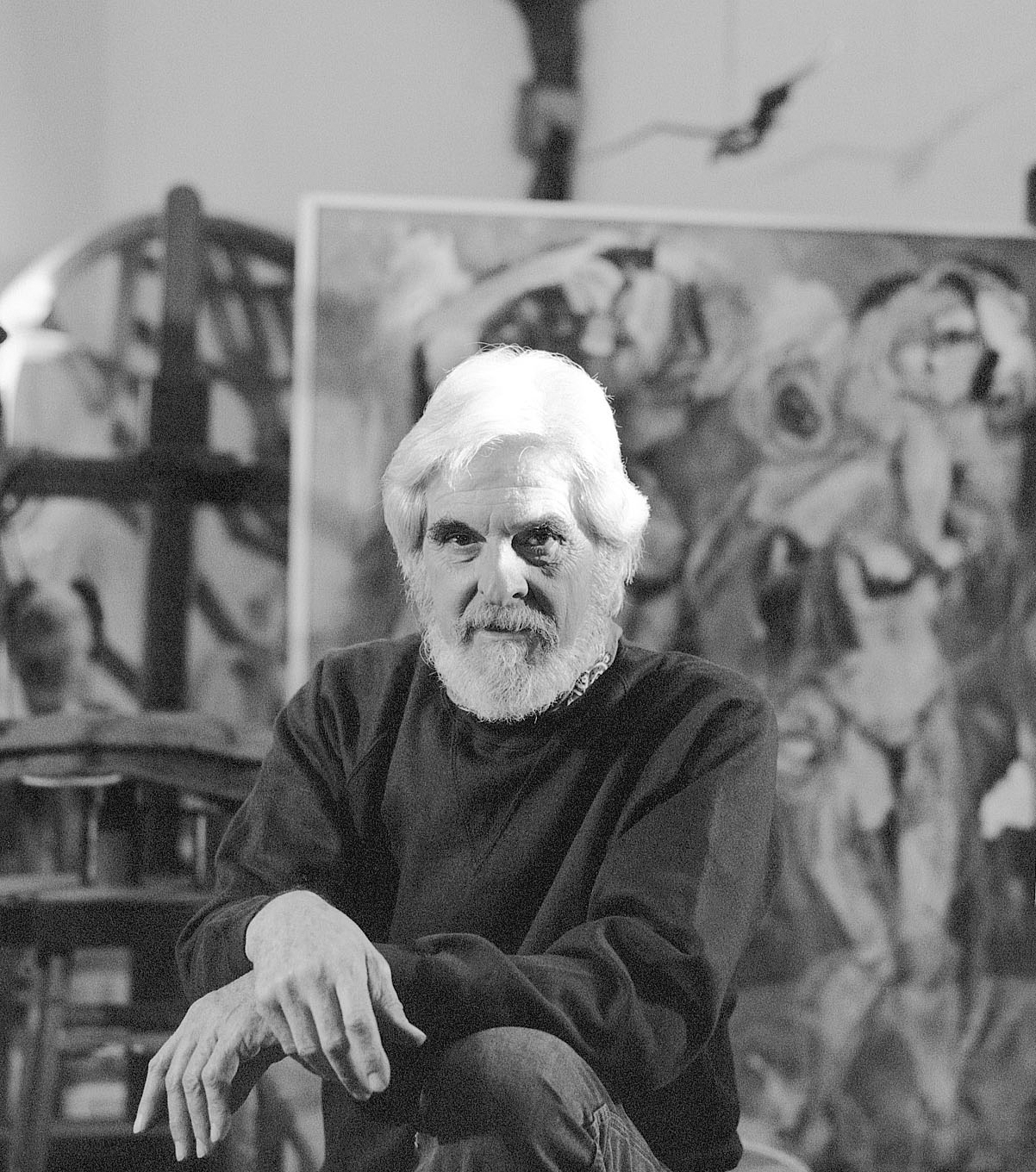
Arosemena Lacayo in 1996

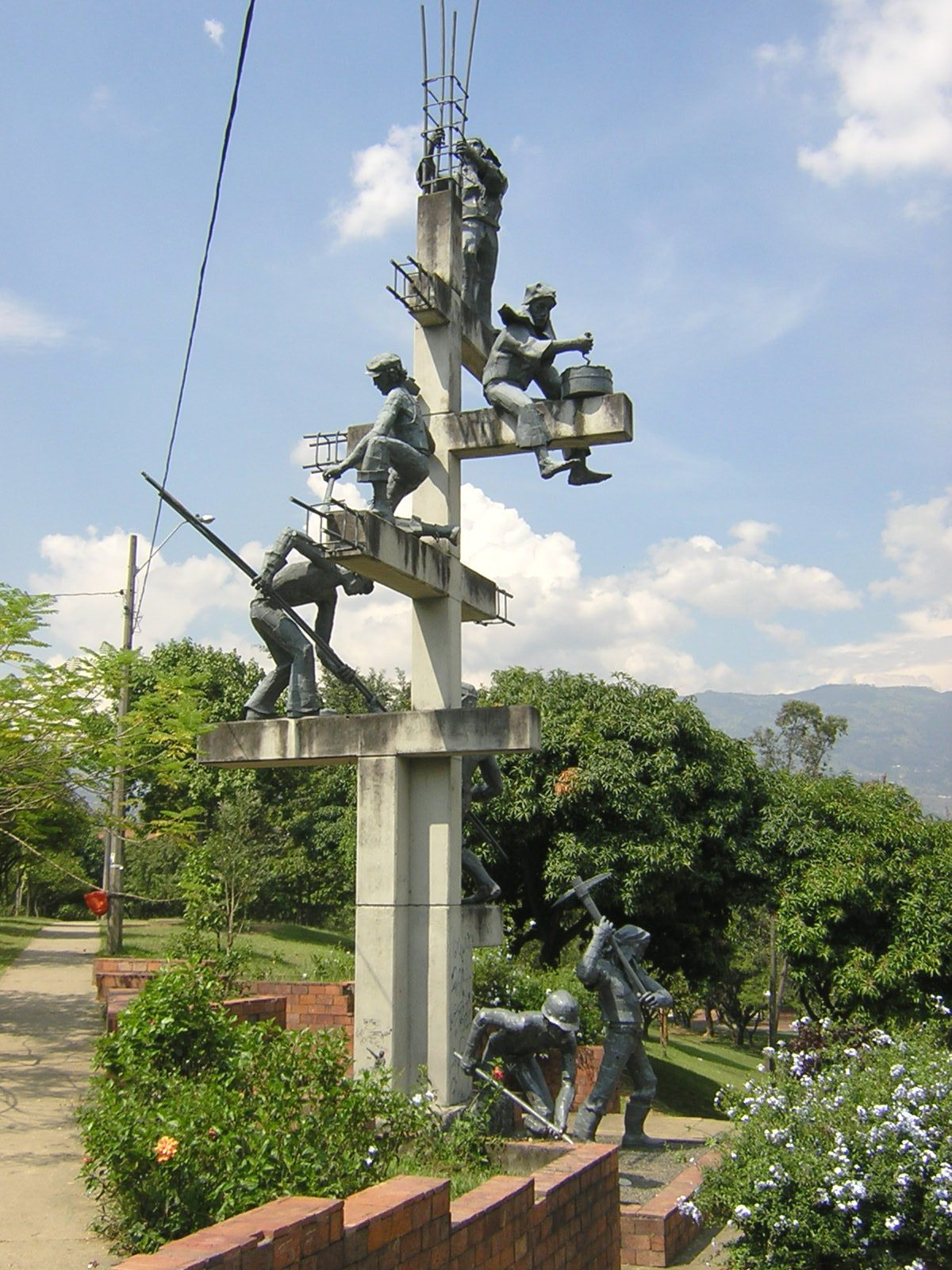
Arosemena Lacayo's work Los Obreros

Justo Arosemena Lacayo (March 31, 1929, Panama City – October 12, 2000) was a Colombian sculptor. Born in Panama, he was based in the city of Medellín.
