= Aguano language =

Unclassified language of Peru

Aguano
- Santa Crucino
- (unattested)
- Native to: Peru
- Region: Santa Cruz de Huallaga
- Ethnicity: 40 Aguano families (1959)
- Extinct: 16th century
- Language family: unclassified (Arawakan?)
- Dialects: Cutinana; Maparina; Aguano proper

Language codes
- ISO 639-3: aga
- Glottolog: agua1251

Aguano is the extinct language of the Aguano people of Peru. Loukotka (1968) identified it with Chamicuro, but Chamicuro speakers say that the Aguano people spoke Quechua (Wise 1987). However, Steward (1946) notes that the Aguano had adopted Quechua soon after the Conquest and that their original language is unclassified. More recently, Campbell & Grondona (2012) leave Aguano unclassified due to lack of attestation. According to Glottolog, the language is Arawakan.

== Names and varieties ==
Alternate spellings are Uguano, Aguanu, Awano; it has also been called Santa Crucino.

Mason (1950) listed three Aguano groups, Aguano proper (including Seculusepa/Chilicawa and Melikine/Tivilo), Cutinana, and Maparina. Schematically, these can be summarized as:

- Aguano
  - Aguano proper
    - Seculusepa (Chilicawa)
    - Melikine (Tivilo)
  - Cutinana
  - Maparina
