= Ahuano, Ecuador =

Ahuano
- village
- Location within Ecuador
- Coordinates: 1°03′25″S 77°33′00″W
- Province: Napo
- Climate: Af

Ahuano (historically also Aguamo) is a small Quechua village on the north bank of the Napo River in Napo Province, Ecuador. It has become known as a tourist destination for the nearby hotel La Casa de Suizo (named after its Swiss founder), and has a school. The town has a population of around 4,000 and has rapidly modernized in the past few years largely due to the income from tourism. There is fresh drinking water pipes, paved roads, multiple internet cafes, a couple dozen bars, and a night club.

== Gallery ==
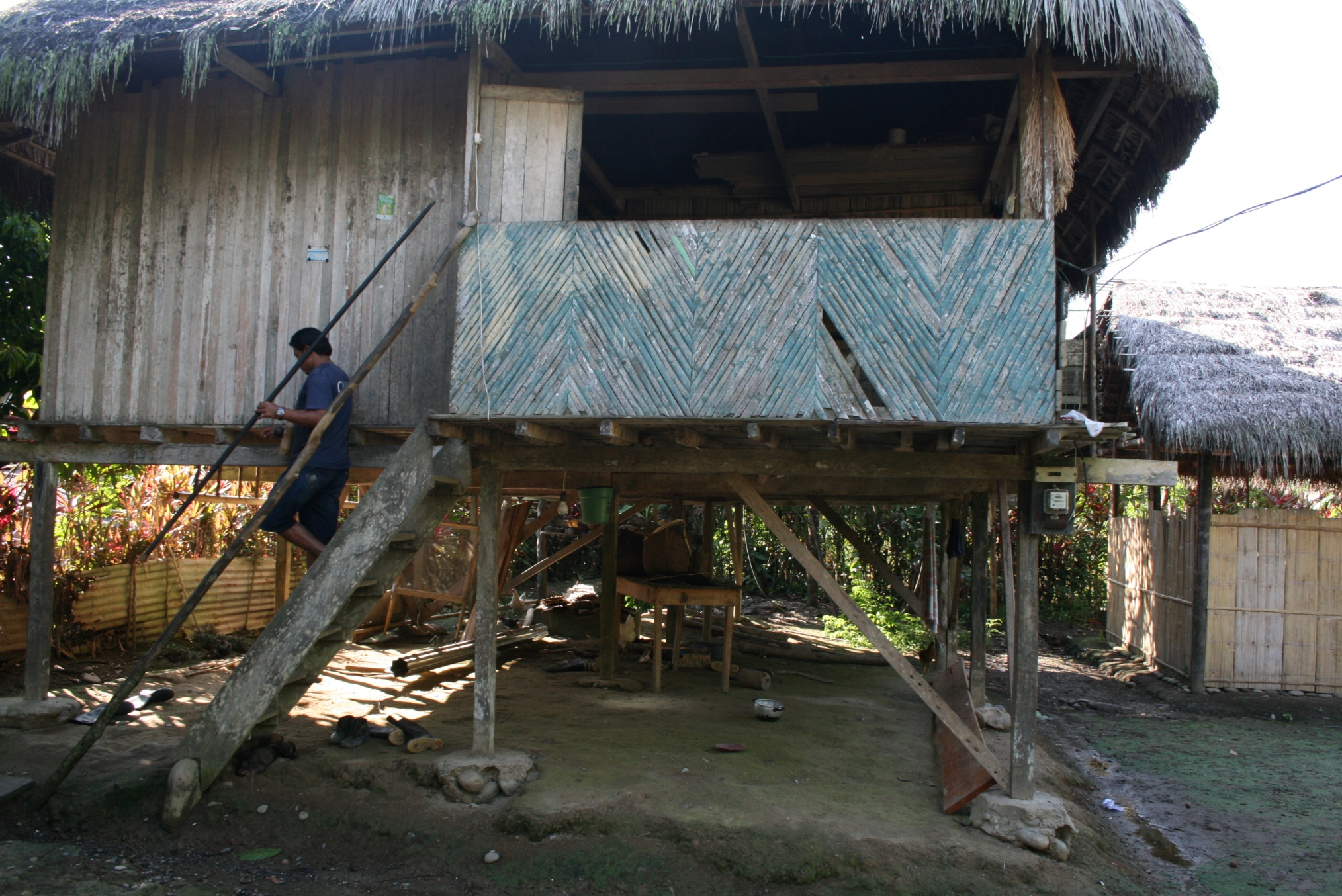
Traditional house (2009)

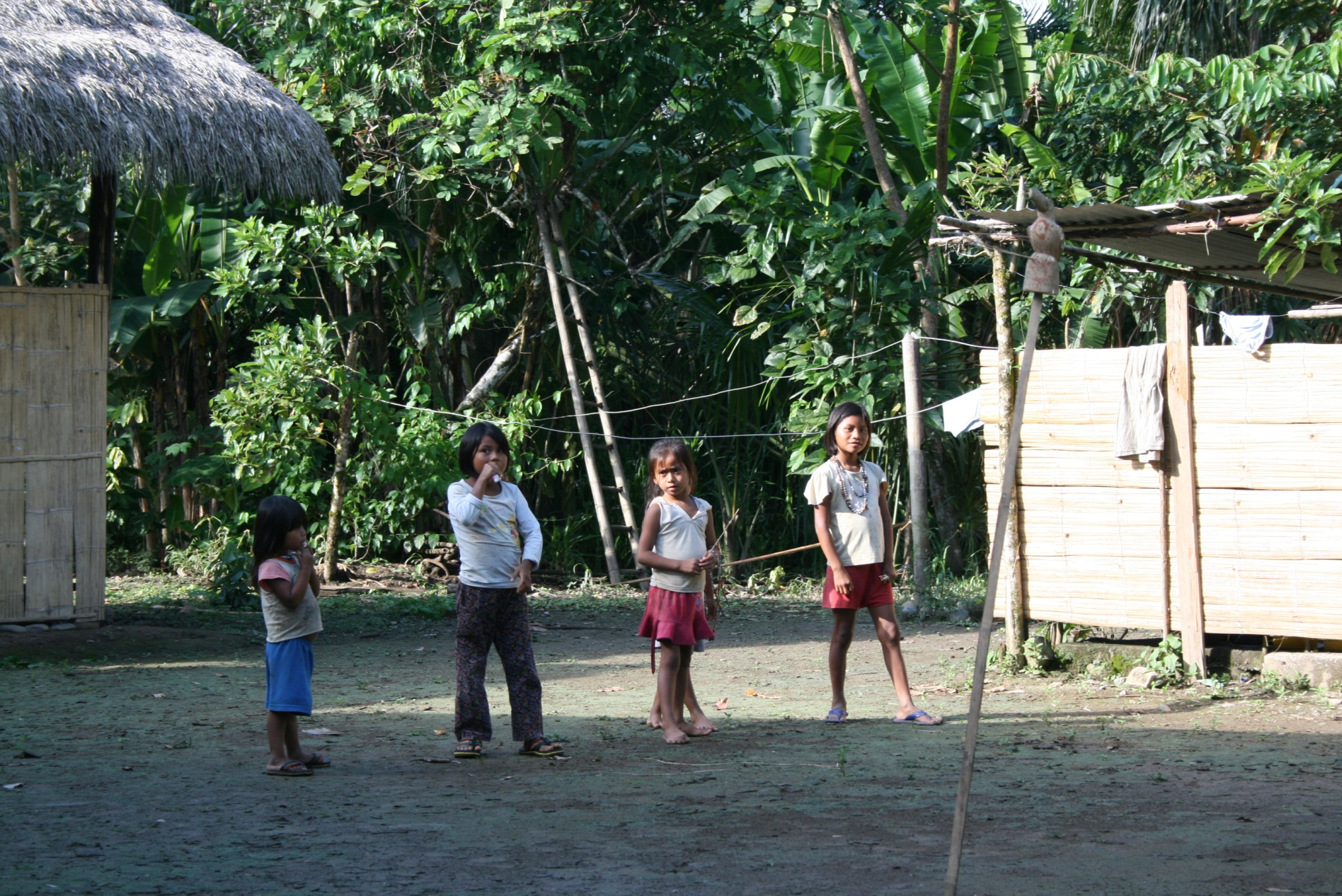
Local children

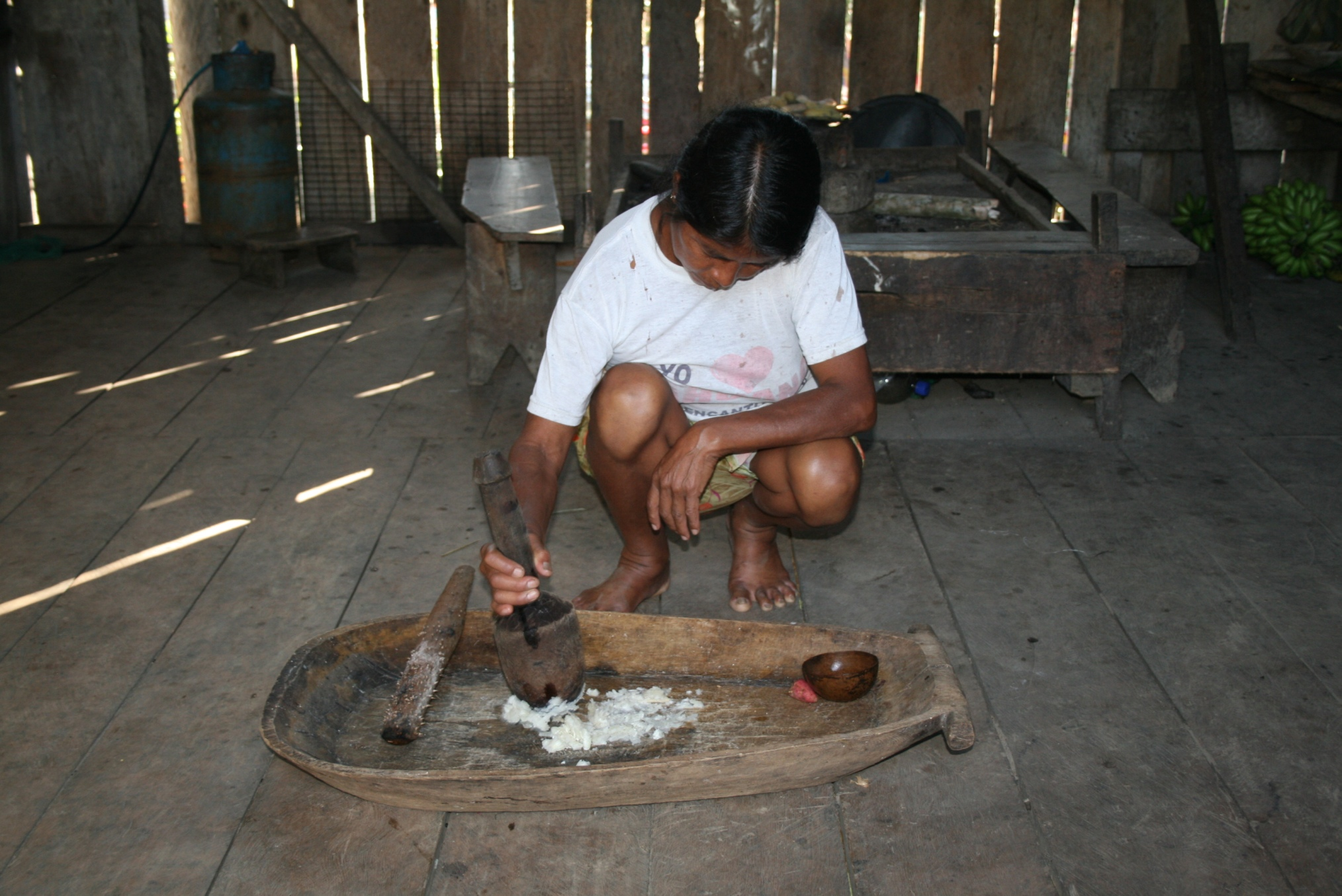
Inside a traditional house

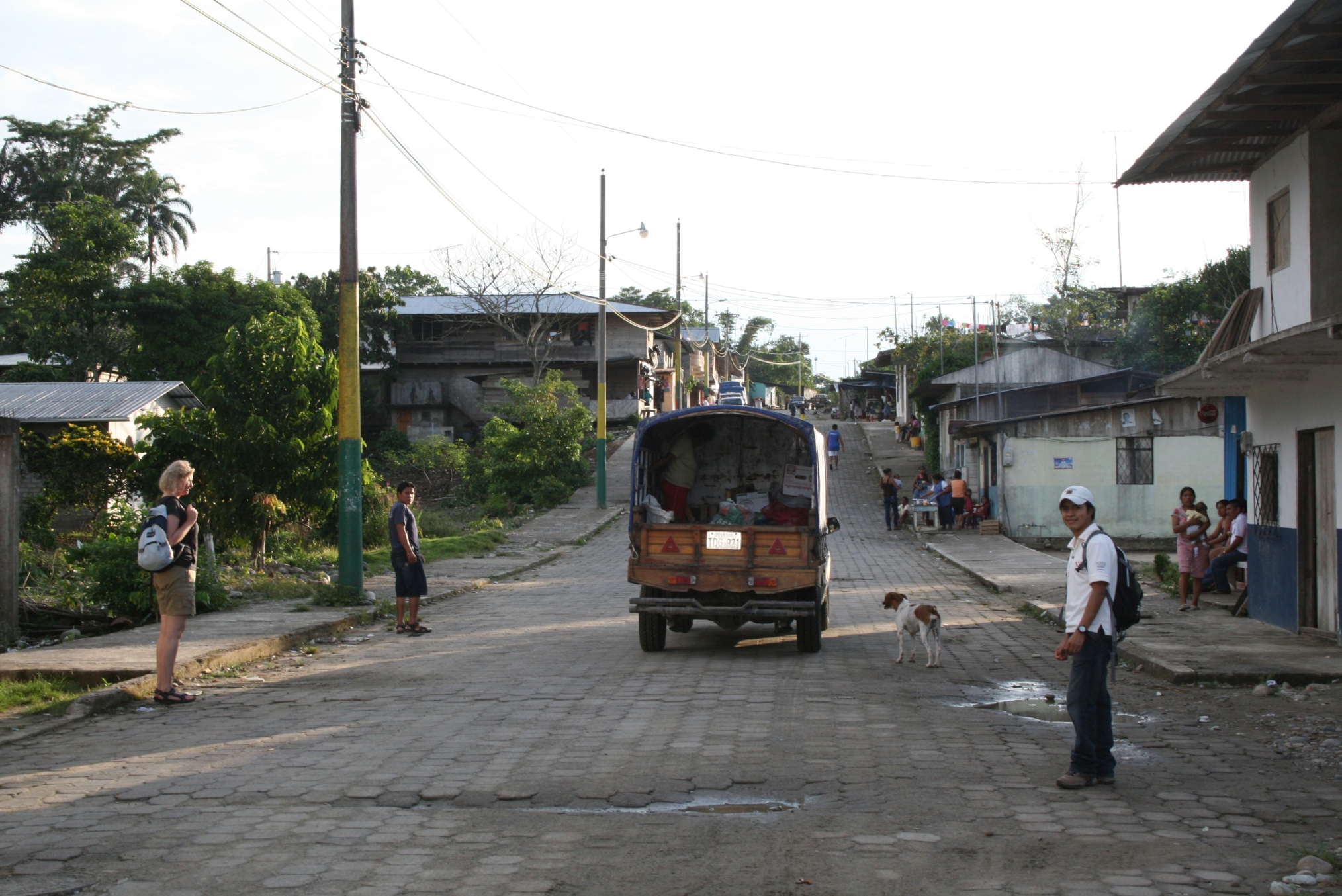
Street in Ahuano (2009)

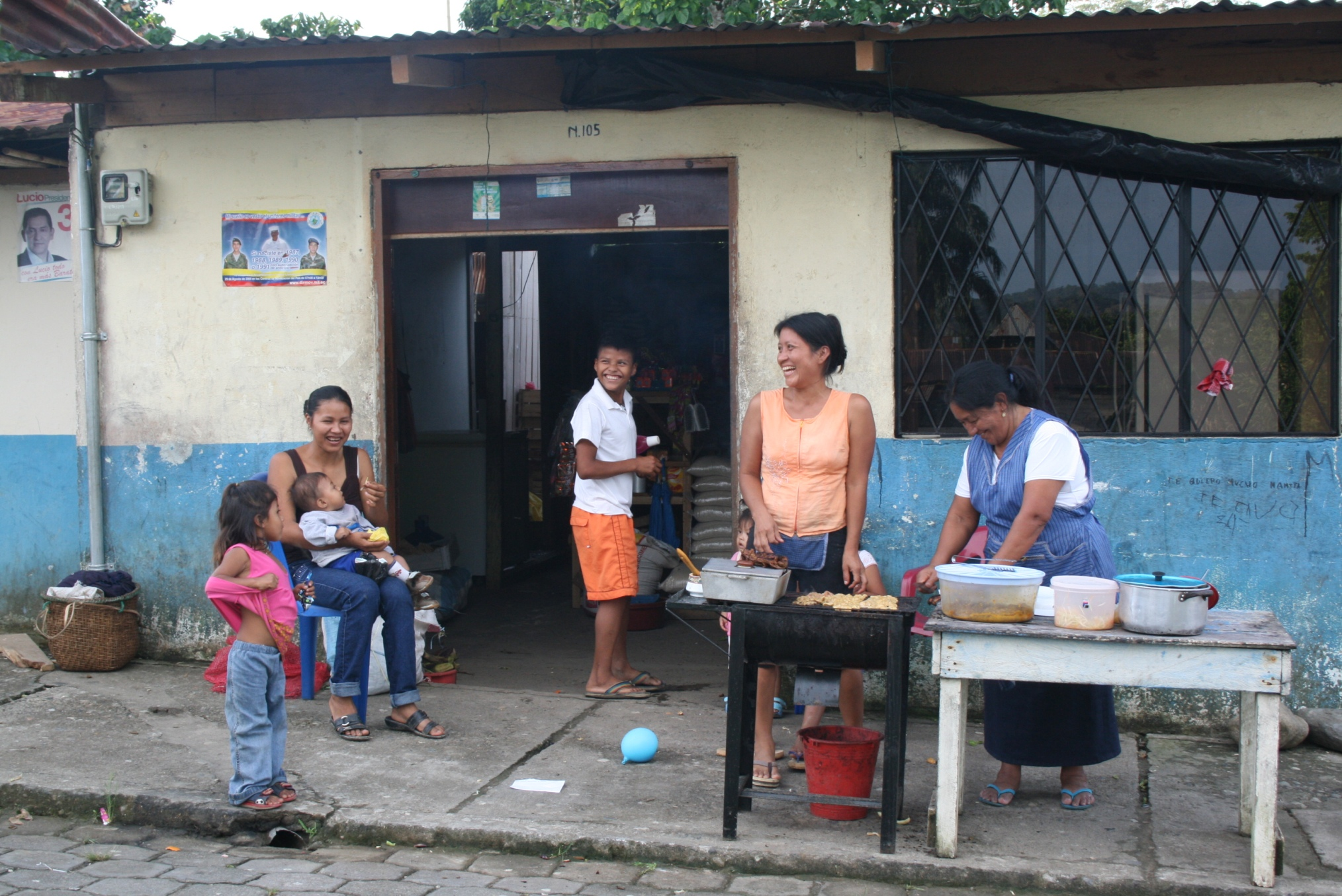
Local residents

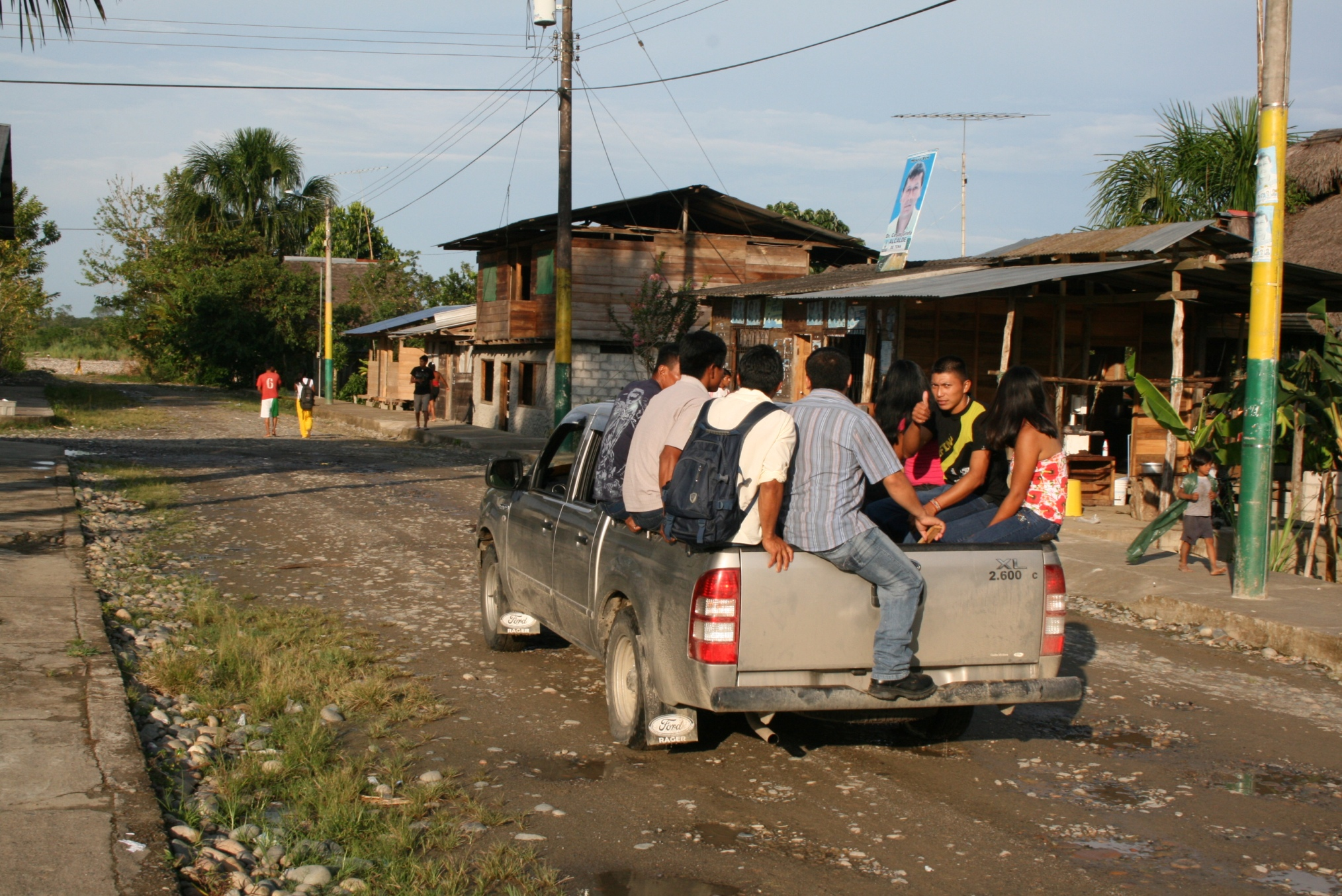
Ahuano Main street (2009)
