= Aguano =

Aguano Santacrucino
Total population
- 14 families (2010)

Regions with significant populations
- Peru

Languages
- Quechua, Spanish, formerly Aguano

Religion
- Roman Catholicism

The Aguano (also Awano, Ahuano, Hilaca, Uguano, Aguanu, Santacrucino, Tibilo) are a people of Peru. In 1959, they consisted of 40 families. They inhabit the lower Huallaga and upper Samiria Rivers, and the right bank tributary of the Marañon River.

Today they farm and have largely converted to Roman Catholicism.

== History ==
In the 16th century, Aguano first encountered the Spanish. Diseases introduced by the Europeans and warfare with the Jívaro people killed off much of the tribe. Surviving members of the Aguano proper, Cutinana, and Maparina peoples joined together to form what became known as the Aguana people.

In the 19th century, the Aguano lived near Santa Cruz at the lower banks of the Huallaga River. As they became more acculturated into Spanish Peruvian society, they adopted the name Santacrucinos.
