= Antisana =

Volcano in Ecuador

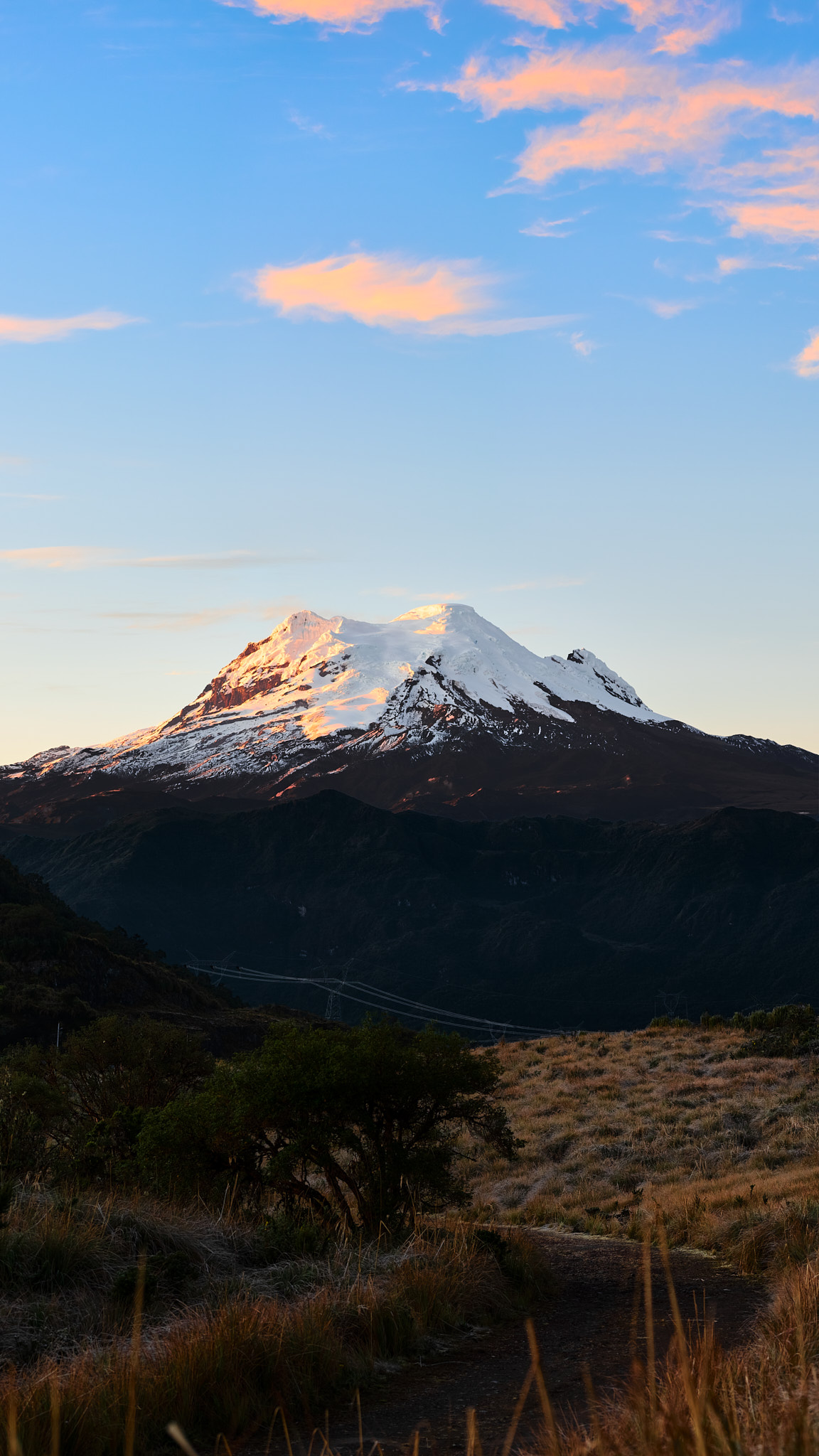
- Northwest face of Antisana volcano at sunrise

Highest point
- Elevation: 5,753 m (18,875 ft)
- Prominence: 1,678 m (5,505 ft)
- Listing: Ultra
- Coordinates: 00°28′53″S 78°08′27″W

Geography
- Location within Ecuador
- Location: Ecuador
- Parent range: Cordillera Real (Andes)

Geology
- Mountain type: Stratovolcano
- Volcanic zone: North Volcanic Zone
- Last eruption: 1801 to 1802

Climbing
- Easiest route: snow/ice climb [?]

Antisana is a stratovolcano of the northern Andes, in Ecuador. It is the fourth highest volcano in Ecuador, at 5,753 metres (18,875 ft), and is located 50 kilometres (31 mi) SE of the capital city of Quito.

Antisana presents one of the most challenging technical climbs in the Ecuadorian Andes. Next to the Pichincha, Cotopaxi, Tungurahua and Chimborazo, the Antisana belongs to the five volcanic mountains that the Prussian-born explorer Alexander von Humboldt tried to climb in 1802 during his American journey. In 1965, the American climber Edwin Bernbaum alongside two Ecuadorean climbers, Rómulo Pazmino and Leonardo Droira, made the first ascent of South Antisana.

Major volcanoes in Ecuador

== See also ==
- Mikakucha
- Lists of volcanoes
  - List of volcanoes in Ecuador
- List of mountains in the Andes
- List of Ultras of South America
