= Napo Province =

Province of Ecuador

Napo Provincia de Napo
- Province
- Province of Napo
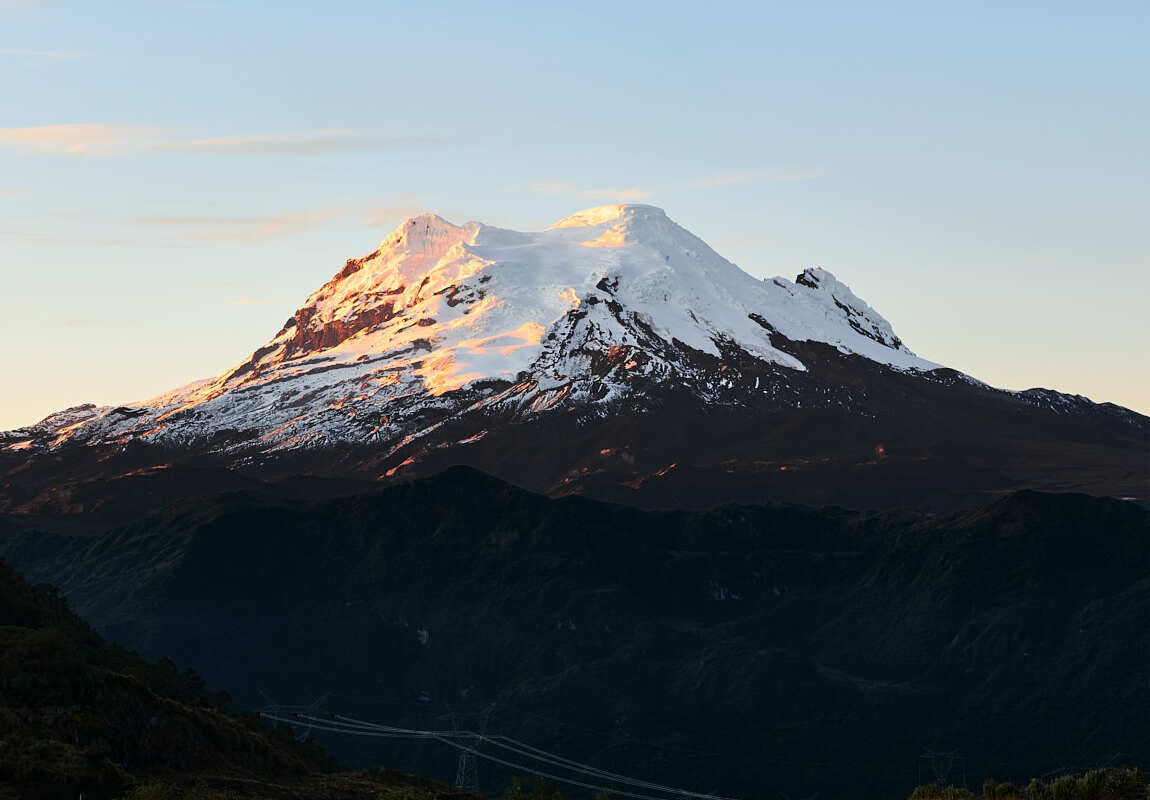
- Antisana

- Flag

- Location of Napo Province in Ecuador.

- Cantons of Napo Province
- Coordinates: 0°59′24″S 77°49′00″W
- Country: Ecuador
- Established: October 22, 1959
- Capital: Tena
- Cantons: List of Cantons

Government
  - Provincial Prefect: José Toapanta

Area
  - Province: 12,513 km^{2} (4,831 sq mi)

Population (2022 census)
  - Province: 131,675
  - Density: 10.523/km^{2} (27.255/sq mi)
  - Urban: 44,675
- Time zone: UTC-5 (ECT)
- Vehicle registration: N
- HDI (2017): 0.731 high · 11th
- Website: www.gobernacionnapo.gob.ec

Napo (Spanish pronunciation: [ˈnapo]) is a province of Ecuador. Its capital is Tena. The province is named after the Napo River. The province is not well developed and does not have much industrial presence. The thick rainforest is home to many natives that remain isolated by preference, descendants of those who fled the Spanish invasion in the Andes, and the Incas years before. In 2000, the province was the sole remaining majority-indigenous province of Ecuador, with 56.3% of the province either claiming indigenous identity or speaking an indigenous language.

This province is one of the many located in Ecuador's section of the Amazon rainforest.

In Napo province are also Antisana Ecological Reserve, Sumaco Napo-Galeras National Park, and Limoncocha National Biological Reserve.

== Demographics ==
Ethnic groups as of the Ecuadorian census of 2010:

- Indigenous 56.8%
- Mestizo 38.1%
- White 2.7%
- Afro-Ecuadorian 1.6%
- Montubio 0.6%
- Other 0.2%

== Cantons ==
The province is divided into five cantons. The following table lists each with its population at the 2001 census, its area in square kilometres (km^{2}), and the name of the canton seat or capital.

Canton	Pop. (2001)	Area (km^{2})	Seat/Capital
Archidona	18,551	3,029	Archidona
Carlos Julio Arosemena Tola	2,943	501	Carlos Julio Arosemena Tola
El Chaco	6,133	3,473	El Chaco
Quijos	5,505	1,577	Baeza
Tena	46,007	3,904	Tena

== See also ==
- Apostolic Vicariate of Napo, the coinciding Roman Catholic missionary circonscription
- Provinces of Ecuador
- Cantons of Ecuador
- A'i (Cofan) people
