= Avianca (disambiguation) =

Avianca is the flag carrier and largest airline of Colombia.

Avianca may also refer to:

== Airlines and related firms ==
- Avianca Group - Avianca Group International Ltd., the restructured successor company of Avianca Holdings
  - Avianca Cargo, a Colombian cargo airline and wholly owned subsidiary
  - Avianca Taxi, Helicol, a subsidiary providing aviation services
  - Avianca Express, a subsidiary Colombian regional airline
  - Avianca El Salvador, formerly TACA, nationally branded airline in the Avianca Holdings group
  - Avianca Guatemala, formerly branded Aviateca
  - Avianca Costa Rica, formerly known as LACSA
  - Avianca Honduras was founded as Isleña Airlines
  - Avianca Nicaragua, La Costeña, a Nicaraguan subsidiary regional airline
  - Avianca Ecuador was founded through a merger between VIP Ecuador and AeroGal
  - Avianca Perú, formerly TACA Perú, defunct airline of Peru
  - Avianca Panama, Aeroperlas, former regional airline of Panama
  - Avianca Services, MRO unit providing aircraft services
- Avianca, brand name for two independent airlines owned by Synergy Group
  - Avianca Argentina, former regional airline owned by Synergy Group
  - Avianca Brasil, former Brazilian airline owned by Synergy Group

== People ==
- Avianca Böhm, a South African-born New Zealand actress, model and former beauty pageant titleholder
- Frank Avianca, was the artist name as film actor and producer of the American rock and roll singer Frankie Sardo

== Places ==
- Avianca Building, a skyscraper located at Bogotá, Colombia

== Sports ==
- Avianca Colombia Open, former golf tournaments on the Tour de las Américas events
