= Abra Group =

Latin American multinational airline holding company

- Type: Private Limited Company
- Traded as: Abra Group
- Industry: Air transport
- Founded: 18 February 2022
- Headquarters: Altrincham, Greater Manchester, England (Registered office)
- Number of locations: Colombia (Bogotá); Brazil (São Paulo); Spain (Madrid); Chile (Santiago de Chile)
- Key people: Constantino de Oliveira Junior (Chairman); Adrian Neuhauser (CEO)
- Products: Air passenger transport (Avianca, GOL, Wamos, Sky); Air cargo transport (Avianca Cargo, Golog); Ground cargo transport (Deprisa); Aircraft maintenance and staff training (Avianca Services); Frequent-flyer program (LifeMiles, Smiles); Travel and holiday services (Avianca Tours); Air taxi and charter services (Helicol)
- Revenue: ▲US$ 9.7 billion (2025)
- Number of employees: +30,000 (2025)
- Subsidiaries: Avianca Colombia; Avianca Express; Avianca Services; Deprisa; LifeMiles; Avianca Cargo; Avianca Cargo México; Avianca Costa Rica; Avianca Ecuador; Avianca El Salvador; Avianca Guatemala; Avianca Honduras; GOL; NG Servicios Aéreos; Smiles; Gollog; Wamos Air; Sky Airline
- Website: www.abragroup.net
- Footnotes; Fleet size: +325 (2025); Destinations: +145 (2025); Carried passengers: +71 million (2025); Loyalty members: +46 million (2025)

Abra Group is a Latin American multinational air transport holding company headquartered in Altrincham, Greater Manchester, England. As of 31 December 2025, it is the second largest airline group in Latin America after LATAM Airlines Group with more than US$9.7 billion in revenue, 30,000 employees, 71 million passengers carried on 325 aircraft to 145 destinations, and 46 million loyalty members. It has subsidiaries in Brazil, Colombia, Spain, Chile, Mexico, El Salvador, Ecuador, Costa Rica, Guatemala and Honduras.

Members of Abra Group include Colombia's flag carrier Avianca, Brazil's GOL and Spain's Wamos. It has some of the lowest unit costs in its respective markets and operates loyalty programs such as LifeMiles and Smiles. Avianca, the second oldest airline in the world, operates more than 140 Airbus A320 and Boeing 787 passenger aircraft as well as seven Airbus A330 freighters, and has more than 14,000 employees. GOL is one of Brazil's largest airlines, operating a standardized fleet of 138 Boeing 737 aircraft, and has 13,900 staff. Spain-based Wamos Air specialises in widebody ACMI operations, operating 13 Airbus A330 passenger aircraft.

In November 2025, Abra announced the incorporation of the SKY Airline into the group, which operates 36 aircraft in the Chilean and Peruvian markets. The announcement was made after the conversion of existing debt and the agreement for the acquisition of the Paulamnn family's stake in the airline. As of June 5, 2026, the transaction has already received authorization from Brazilian and Chilean authorities, and is pending the green light from the Peruvian side.

== Foundation and early years ==
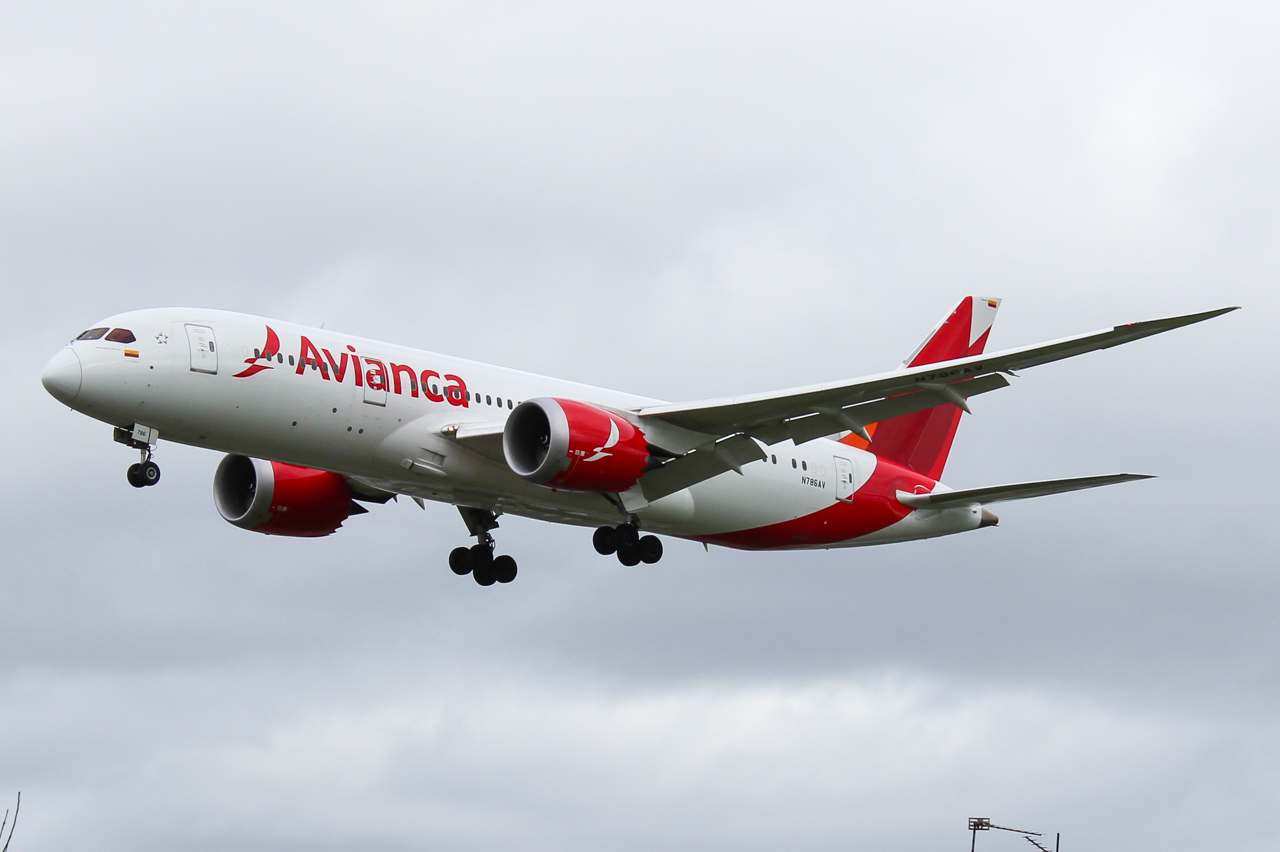
Avianca Boeing 787-8

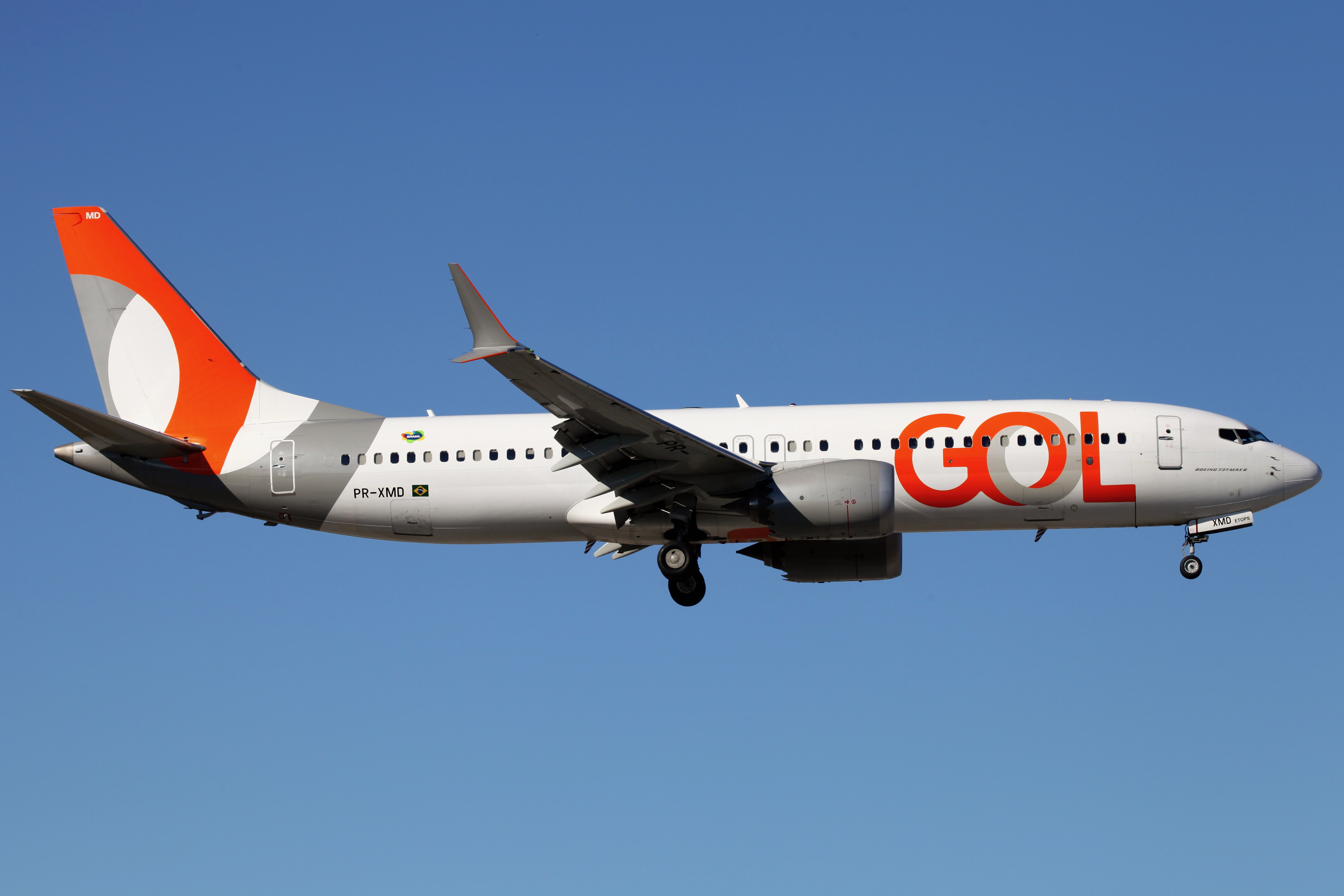
GOL Boeing 737 MAX 8

Abra Group was announced on 11 May 2022, when the main shareholders of Avianca and the controlling shareholder of GOL entered into an agreement to create a Latin American air transportation holding company called Abra Group Limited. The objective of the strategy was to control both Avianca and GOL and bring their brands together under a single group, leveraging operational, financial, and route network synergies, without merging the brands or the operations of the two airlines.

At the time of the announcement, the group also planned to include economic interests in Viva Air Colombia and Viva Air Perú, and a minority investment, through convertible debt, in Chilean carrier Sky Airline. However, the agreement between Avianca and Viva Air was eventually terminated in 2023, following regulatory hurdles and the financial crisis faced by the Colombian low-cost carrier, which suspended its operations before the merger could be completed.

The initial leadership of Abra Group included Roberto Kriete as chairman, one of the founding figures of TACA International Airlines and Avianca Holdings, and Constantino de Oliveira Júnior, founder of Gol Linhas Aéreas, as chief executive officer (CEO). The group's registered headquarters were established in the United Kingdom, with an operational and strategic focus across Latin America.

=== Acquisition of Wamos Air ===
In January 2024, Abra Group announced the start of negotiations for the acquisition of Wamos Air, a Spanish airline specialized in wet-lease (aircraft leasing with crew) and charter flights. The transaction was part of the Group's international expansion strategy, focusing on strengthening its presence in Europe and increasing its wide-body aircraft offering for long-haul operations.

During the evaluation process, Abra Group highlighted Wamos Air's strategic role in the ACMI (Aircraft, Crew, Maintenance and Insurance) market — a segment that had been experiencing strong demand following the post-pandemic recovery of air transport. The Spanish airline operated a fleet composed mainly of Airbus A330 aircraft, serving major carriers in Europe, the Americas and the Middle East.

In July 2024, Abra Group signed a memorandum of understanding (MoU) with Airbus for the acquisition of five Airbus A350-900 aircraft. The wide-body, long-range model was chosen to expand the group's intercontinental connectivity, enabling new routes between South America and Europe. The MoU announcement explicitly highlighted that the Abra Group was also making a strategic investment in Wamos Air, thereby associating the A350-900 order with the Spanish wet-lease and charter operator and its planned integration into the group’s fleet structure.

In October 2024, Abra Group completed the acquisition of Wamos Air. The airline retained its brand and independent operations, while being operationally integrated into the Abra Group to provide flexibility in ACMI contracts and serve both the group's airline needs and those of third parties.

== Regional expansion plans ==
=== Acquisition of Sky Airline ===
In 2021, Sky Airline issued a convertible debt instrument, valued at approximately US$70–100 million, as part of its post‑pandemic financing strategy. Abra Group acquired (or later assumed) this debt, with an option to convert it into an equity stake of up to 40–41% of Sky Airline. Despite the investment, the majority shareholders of SKY, the Paulmann Mast family, retained control of the company and its independent operations.

In May 2023, the CEO of Gol Linhas Aéreas stated that SKY might eventually join Abra Group, signalling that negotiations were underway.

=== NG Servicios Aéreos ===
In October 2025, amid reports of potential pressure on SKY Airline shareholders to either sell the airline entirely or convert debt into an equity stake, Abra Group filed an application with the Dirección General de Aeronáutica Civil (DGAC) of Chile for an Air Operator Certificate (AOC) for NG Servicios Aéreos, a company focused on non‑scheduled operations, including charter and ACMI flights, based in Santiago de Chile.

Subsequently, photos on social media showed the airline's first aircraft, a Boeing 737‑800 from Gol Linhas Aéreas, with the Chilean aeronautical registration CC-DNU and the phrase "Operated by NG Servicios Aéreos" on the fuselage, in the maintenance hangar of the Brazilian airline in Belo Horizonte, Brazil. The establishment of the Chilean airline was interpreted as a strategic move by Abra Group to establish an operational base in Chile, while simultaneously applying leverage in ongoing negotiations with SKY regarding a potential integration into the group.

In November 2025, Abra announced the incorporation of Sky Airline. The announcement was made after the conversion of existing debt and the agreement for the acquisition of the Paulmann family's stake in the airline. As of June 5, 2026, the transaction has already received authorization from Brazilian and Chilean authorities and is pending the green light from the Peruvian side. The acquisition will give Abra a stronger presence in the Chilean and Peruvian markets.

On July 21, 2026, the Abra Group announced the purchase of 20 Embraer E-195 E2 aircraft for its subsidiaries. Another 35 are purchase rights (10) and purchase intentions (15). The idea is to expand the regional network in various locations where the holding company operates.

== Subsidiaries ==
=== Current ===
- Avianca Group
  - Avianca Colombia
    - Avianca Express
    - Avianca Services
    - Deprisa
    - LifeMiles
  - Avianca Cargo
    - Avianca Cargo México
  - Avianca Costa Rica
  - Avianca Ecuador
  - Avianca El Salvador
  - Avianca Guatemala
  - Avianca Honduras
- Gol Linhas Aéreas
  - NG Servicios Aéreos
  - Smiles
  - Gollog
  - Varig (brand owner)
- Wamos Air
- Sky Airline Chile
  - Sky Airline Peru
  - Sky Airline Ecuador

== Fleet ==
As of July 2026, the fleet of Abra Group is composed of aircraft from the manufacturers Airbus and Boeing, reflecting the combined operations of the group's two main airlines, GOL and Avianca. The fleet primarily includes narrow-body aircraft, such as the Airbus A320 and Boeing 737, used on domestic and regional routes, as well as wide-body aircraft for medium and long-haul flights, such as the Boeing 787 Dreamliner.

Abra Group fleet
Aircraft	In service	Orders	Passengers	Notes
Airbus A319-100	8	—	144	Operated by Avianca; 50 A320neo were ordered by the Abra Group
Airbus A320-200	79	—	180	Operated by Avianca; 50 A320neo were ordered by the Abra Group
Airbus A320neo	48	40	180	Operated by Avianca; 50 A320neo were ordered by the Abra Group
Airbus A320neo	48	50	180	Operated by Avianca; 50 A320neo were ordered by the Abra Group
Airbus A330-200	5	—	280	Operated by Wamos Air
Airbus A330-300	8	—	408	Operated by Wamos Air
Airbus A330-900	—	7	TBA	Leased from Avolon; Five aircraft expected to be delivered to GOL while another two to Avianca
Airbus A350-900	—	5	TBA	Ordered by the Abra Group; Expected to be delivered to Wamos Air
Boeing 737-700	12	—	138	Operated by GOL
Boeing 737-800	64	—	186	Operated by GOL
Boeing 737 MAX 8	58	45	186	Operated by GOL
Boeing 737 MAX 10	—	30	TBA	Operated by GOL
Boeing 787-8	16	—	291	Operated by Avianca
Embraer E195-E2	—	45	TBA	They will be redistributed to the holding company's businesses. They are expected to arrive by the third quarter of 2027.
Cargo fleet
Airbus A330-200F	6	—	Cargo	Operated by Avianca Cargo
Airbus A330-200P2F	1	1	Cargo	Operated by Avianca Cargo
Airbus A330-300P2F	2	2	Cargo	Operated by Avianca Cargo
Boeing 737-800BCF	9	—	Cargo	Operated by GOLLOG
Total	316	178		
