= Avianca Group =

British multinational airline holding company

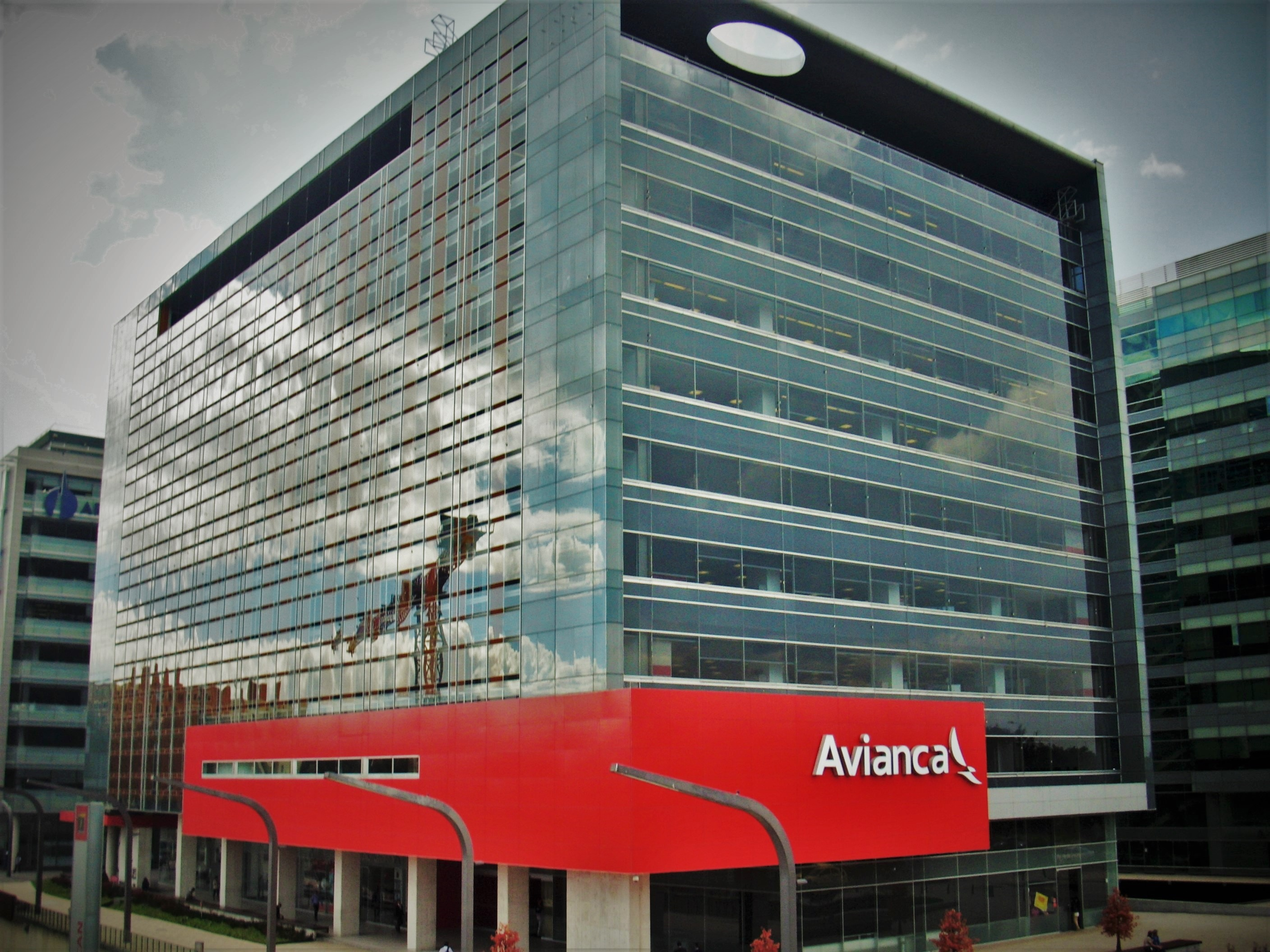
- Avianca Headquarters in Bogotá
- Type: Private Limited Company
- Industry: Air transport
- Founded: February 2010
- Headquarters: St Albans, Hertfordshire, England (registered office); Bogotá, Colombia (Corporate headquarters)
- Number of locations: Colombia (Bogotá)
- Key people: Frederico Pedreira (CEO); Roberto Kriete (chairman)
- Products: Air passenger transport (Avianca); Air cargo transport (Avianca Cargo); Ground cargo transport (Deprisa); Aircraft maintenance and staff training (Avianca Services); Frequent-flyer program (LifeMiles); Travel and holiday services (Avianca Tours)
- Revenue: ▲US$ 4.3 billion (2012)
- Net income: ▲US$ 198.6 million (2012)
- Number of employees: +30,000 (2025)
- Parent: Abra Group
- Subsidiaries: Avianca; Avianca Express; Avianca Services; Deprisa; LifeMiles; Avianca Cargo; Avianca Cargo México; Avianca Costa Rica; Avianca Ecuador; Avianca El Salvador; Avianca Guatemala; Avianca Honduras
- Website: ir.avianca.com

Avianca Group International Limited (formerly Avianca Holdings S.A. and AviancaTaca Holding Inc.) is a pan-regional Colombian multinational airline holding company with its registered office in St Albans, Hertfordshire, England, and its global headquarters in Bogotá, Colombia. It is the second largest air transport group in Latin America after LATAM Airlines.

The Group dates back to when it was formed in February 2010 after a merger agreement between Avianca and TACA Airlines, the flag carriers of Colombia and El Salvador, respectively, when Avianca and TACA became wholly owned subsidiaries of Avianca Holdings. TACA's shareholders were given 29% and Avianca's shareholders were given 71% of the shares in the new company.

The company was previously a dual listed company with listings on the New York Stock Exchange and the Colombia Stock Exchange as Avianca Holdings. Since its inception, the Avianca Group has expanded its portfolio of operations and brands with the acquisition of the Mexican AeroUnion in 2014. The Group also owns the Avianca Express brand and the rewards program LifeMiles.

== Operations ==
The company is the second-largest airline holding in Latin America by revenue and fleet size after LATAM Airlines based in Santiago, Chile. With a fleet of 173 aircraft and more than 19,000 employees, Avianca serves over 100 destinations in America and Europe, which connect to over 750 destinations worldwide through codeshare agreements with partner airlines. Avianca carried 24.6 million passengers in 2013.

== Subsidiaries ==
=== Current ===
- Avianca
  - Avianca Express
  - Avianca Services
  - Deprisa
  - LifeMiles
- Avianca Cargo (formerly Tampa Cargo)
  - Avianca Cargo México (formerly AeroUnion)
- Avianca Costa Rica (formerly LACSA)
- Avianca Ecuador (formerly AeroGal)
- Avianca El Salvador (formerly TACA Airlines)
- Avianca Guatemala (formerly Aviateca)
- Avianca Honduras (formerly Isleña; dormant)

=== Former ===
- Aeroperlas
- Avianca Perú (formerly TACA Perú)
- Helicol
- La Costeña
- SANSA
- Servicios Aeroportuarios Integrados

== Shareholding ==
Former logo

Shareholding composition of Avianca Holding S.A. as of March 31, 2021:

- BRW Aviation – 51.53 %
- Kingsland Holdings – 14.46 %
- United Airlines – less than 1%
- Avianca Holdings – 15.64 %
- Several pension funds plus numerous individual investors, mostly Colombian and others – 17.37%

== Corporate affairs ==
The key trends for the Avianca Group are (as of the financial year ending December 31):

	Total revenue (US$ m)	Net profit (Note: "Net profit/net loss from the period") (US$ m)	Number of employees (FTE)	Number of passengers (m) (Note: "Total passengers carried")	Passenger load factor (%)	Total aircraft	References
2011	3,794	99	17,360	20.4	79.6		
2012	4,269	38	18,071	23.0	79.6	147	
2013	4,609	248	19,153	24.6	80.5	171	
2014	4,703	128	19,961	26.2	79.4	193	
2015	4,361	−139	20,485	28.2	79.7	193	
2016	4,138	44.2	20,449	29.4	81.1	191	
2017	4,441	82.0	18,641	30.5	81.7	187	
2018	4,890	1.1	18,338	30.6	83.0	191	
2019	4,621	−894	16,707	30.5	81.7	196	
2020	1,711	−1,094	14,568	7.9	74.1	171	
2021	336	−15.1				150	
2022	4,047	−322		24.6		140	
2023	4,771	131				158	
2024	5,274	122				177	

== Paradise Papers ==
On November 5, 2017, the Paradise Papers, a set of confidential electronic documents relating to offshore investment, revealed that the company's former Chairman Germán Efromovich was linked to an offshore conglomerate used for the aero-commercial holding business with ramifications in Bermuda, Panama and Cyprus. Efromovich used a Panamanian offshore that hid more than 20 firms located in tax havens. The conglomerate was used by Avianca Holdings in the purchase of MacAir Jet, now Avianca Argentina, an aircraft company owned by Macri Group, for an amount of US$10 million. Allowing Avianca to make headway in the low-cost carrier business in Argentina. The Argentine government accepted these offshores as a financial guarantee to assign air routes to Avianca which is now being investigated by the Argentine federal justice system.

== Bankruptcy ==
On May 10, 2020, Avianca filed for Chapter 11 bankruptcy in the United States after failing to pay bondholders, becoming one of the major airlines to file for bankruptcy due to the COVID-19 pandemic crisis.

In November 2020, the U.S. Bankruptcy Court for the Southern District of New York approved its $2 billion refinancing plan.

In November 2021, Avianca Holdings announced they would move their legal address from Panama to the United Kingdom, and that they would change their name to Avianca Group. On December 1, 2021, Avianca emerged from Chapter 11 bankruptcy for the second time in its history.

== Fleet ==
As of March 2026, the fleet of the Avianca Group consists of the following aircraft:

Aircraft	In Service	Orders	Passengers					Notes
Aircraft	In Service	Orders	C	W	Y+	Y	Total	Notes
Airbus A319-100	8	—	–	12	48	84	144	Originally scheduled to be retired by 2024.
Airbus A320-200	79	—	–	12	60	108	180	
Airbus A320neo	50	88	–	12	60	108	180	
Airbus A330-900	—	2	TBA					To be inherited from Azul Brazilian Airlines.
Boeing 787-8	13	—	20	–	36	235	291	
Boeing 787-8	3	—	32	–	–	259	291	Former Norwegian Long Haul aircraft.
Cargo fleet
Airbus A330-200F	6	—	Cargo					
Airbus A330-200P2F	1	1	Cargo					
Airbus A330-300P2F	2	2	Cargo					
Total	162	93						
