= Sky Airline =

Chilean airline

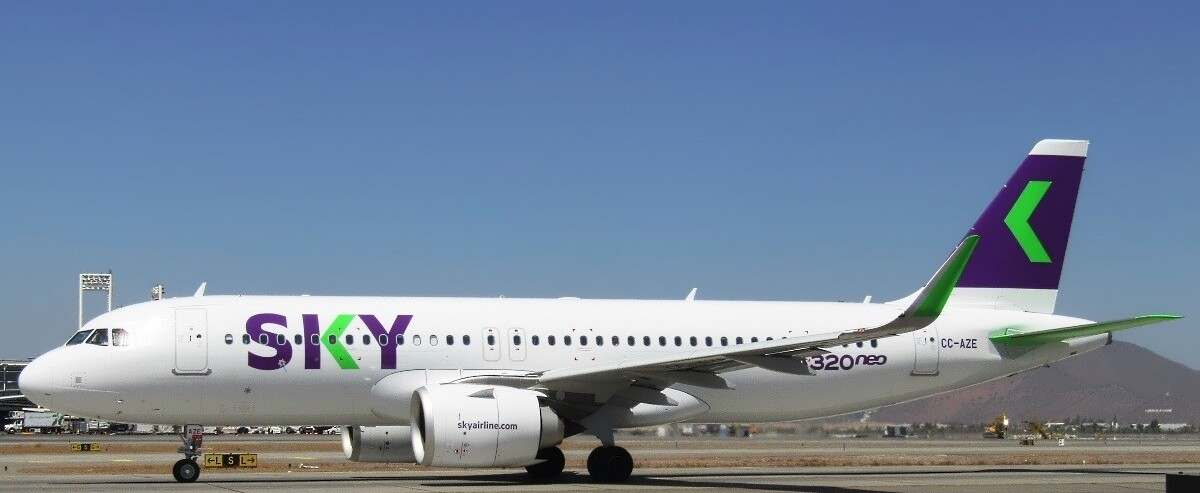
- Sky Airline A320neo
IATA	ICAO	Call sign
H2	SKU	AEROSKY
- Founded: 2001; 25 years ago
- Hubs: Arturo Merino Benítez International Airport
- Frequent-flyer program: Sky Plus
- Subsidiaries: Sky Airline Ecuador; Sky Airline Peru
- Fleet size: 36
- Destinations: 45
- Parent company: Abra Group (minority investment)
- Headquarters: Santiago, Chile
- Key people: Jürgen Paulmann (founder); Holger Paulmann (CEO)
- Website: skyairline.com

Sky Airline, styled as SꓘY, is an airline based at Arturo Merino Benítez International Airport in Santiago, Chile. It is the second largest airline in the country behind flag-carrier LATAM Airlines and the first airline to operate under a low-cost model in the country. It serves international routes to Argentina, Brazil, Colombia, Peru and Uruguay. It also operates charter flights in Chile and South America and domestic flights within Peru.

== History ==
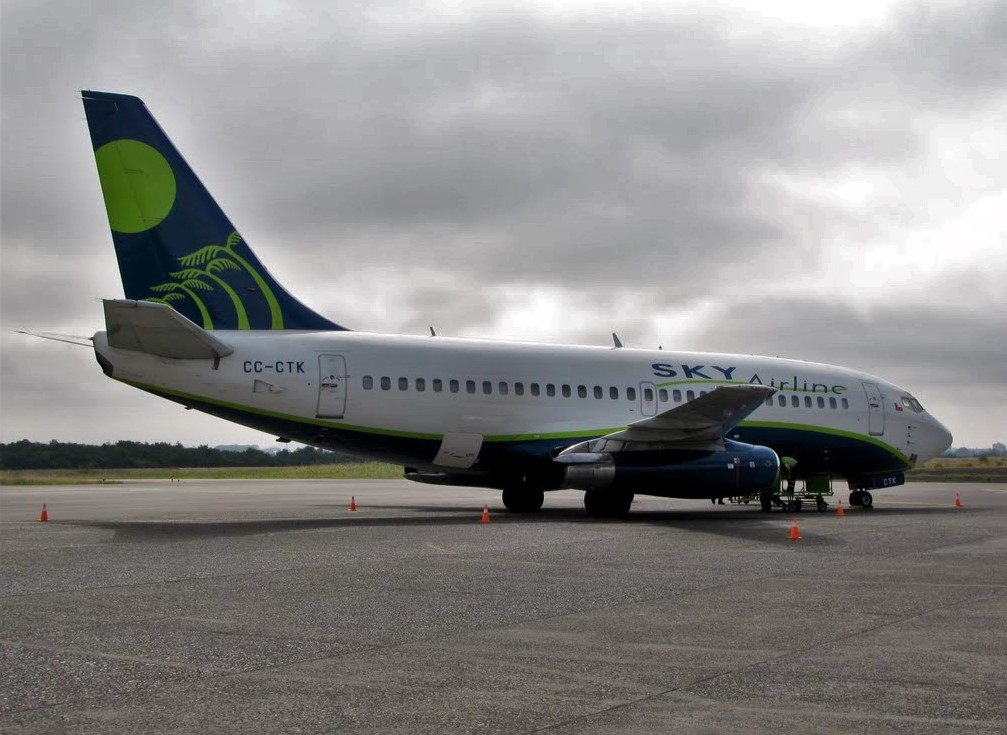
A Boeing 737-200 formerly operated by Sky Airline between 2001 and 2013

Sky Airline was founded in 1981 as Flight Service - Servicios Aereos Ltda, operating air taxi services within Chile with 2 Piper PA-23-250F Aztec (CC-CGB and CC-CGC) aircraft and 1 Piper PA-31-350 Navajo Chieftain (CC-CFE) from Modelillo Airport in Valparaiso, later moving to Los Cerrillos in Santiago. In 1999, it became controlled by a company made up of Jürgen Paulmann and Fernando Uauy, a businessman who had worked at National Airlines of Chile and Avant Airlines. The operation then changed its name to Sky Airline and began operating charters to Cuba in July 2001 with a Boeing 737/200 Adv.

Sky Airline was controlled by its founder, Jürgen Paulmann (1930–2014), a German-Chilean businessman, brother of retail billionaire Horst Paulmann. It started Chilean domestic operations in December 2001 and made the first flights from Santiago to Northern Chile in June 2002. Since 2005, Sky Airline is a full member of IATA.

In April 2009, the company signed an agreement with Aerolíneas Argentinas, allowing the Argentinean flag carrier to offer in all its commercial offices and through its electronic ticket system most of the destinations covered by Sky Airline in Chile.

In 2011, it signed a codeshare agreement with TACA for domestic flights in Chile, Peru and between both countries. In 2012, it signed a codeshare agreement with TACA's parent company, Colombia's Avianca for operations between Chile and Colombia.

The airline planned to transition to a low-cost carrier model during 2015 and 2016 to reduce costs.

On June 28, 2023, it was announced that Avianca and Gol Linhas Aéreas Inteligentes are in the process of integrating Sky into the Abra Group.

== Awards ==
Sky Airline was named the Best Regional Airline in South America in the 2014, 2015 and 2016 Skytrax World Airline Awards.

In addition, OAG (Official Airline Guide) declared Sky Airline as the most punctual airline of 2016.

== Maintenance ==
Maintenance services are supplied by AIRMAN, a sister maintenance company based in Santiago Airport.

== Destinations ==
The airline serves destinations in South, Central and Northern America as well as in the Caribbean.

Countries served by Sky Airline as of March 2026

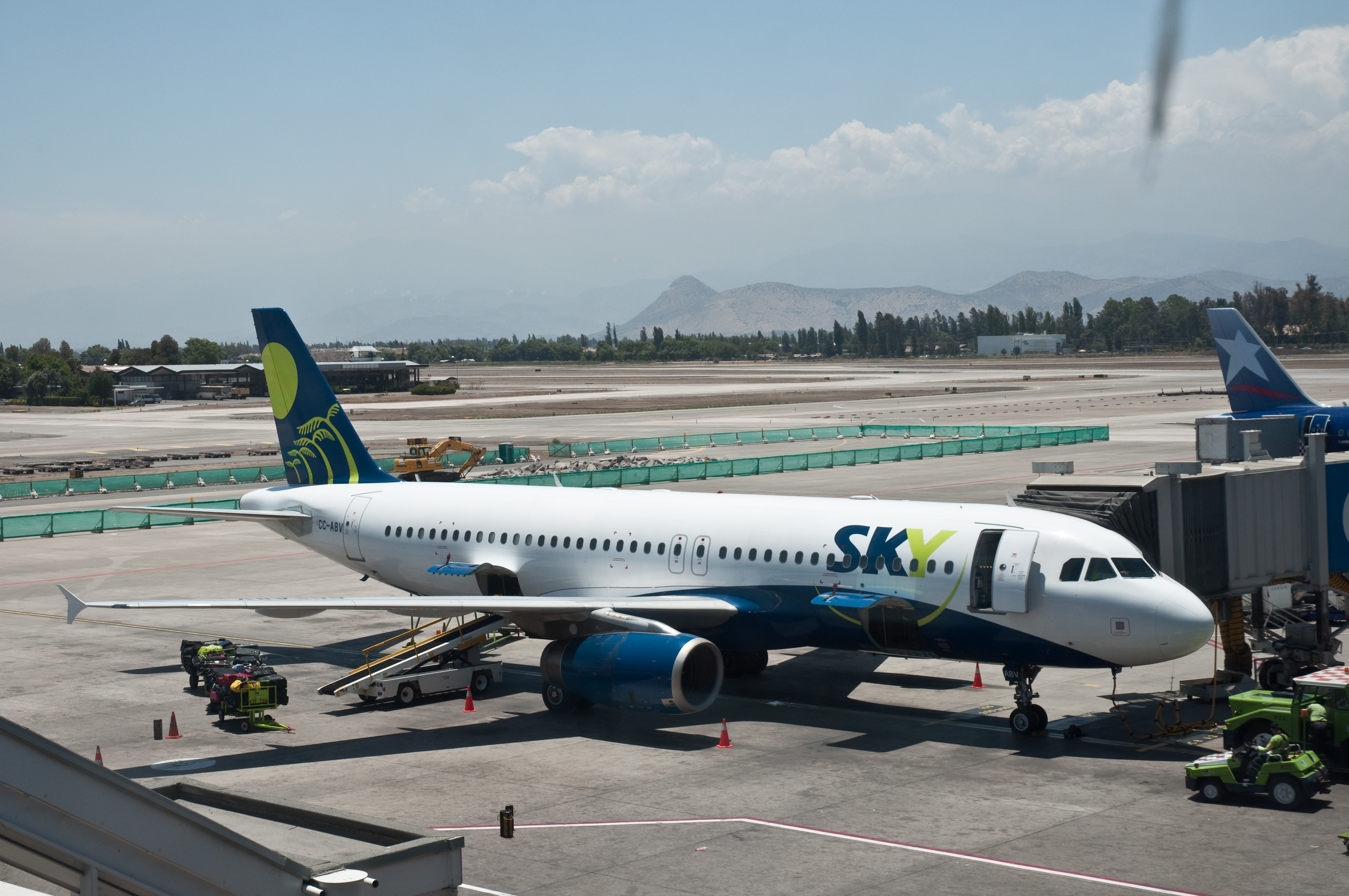
Sky Airline Airbus A320-200 at Arturo Merino Benítez International Airport (2010)

=== Interline agreements ===
Sky Airline has interline agreements with the following airlines:

- Aerolineas Argentinas
- Air Europa
- Air France
- KLM
- TAP Air Portugal
- United Airlines

== Fleet ==
=== Current fleet ===
As of March 2026, Sky Airline operates an all-Airbus A320neo family fleet composed of the following aircraft:

Sky Airline fleet
Aircraft	In Service	Orders	Passengers	Notes
Airbus A320neo	29	—	186	
Airbus A321neo	7	—	238	
Airbus A321XLR	—	10	TBA	Deliveries from 2026.
Total	36	10		

=== Fleet development ===
In September 2018, Airbus delivered the airline's first A320neo.

In June 2019, Sky Airline signed a lease contract for three A321neo aircraft from Air Lease Corporation with deliveries scheduled in 2020 and 2021. The first A321neo was delivered in June 2021.

In December 2019, the airline ordered 10 A321XLR aircraft.

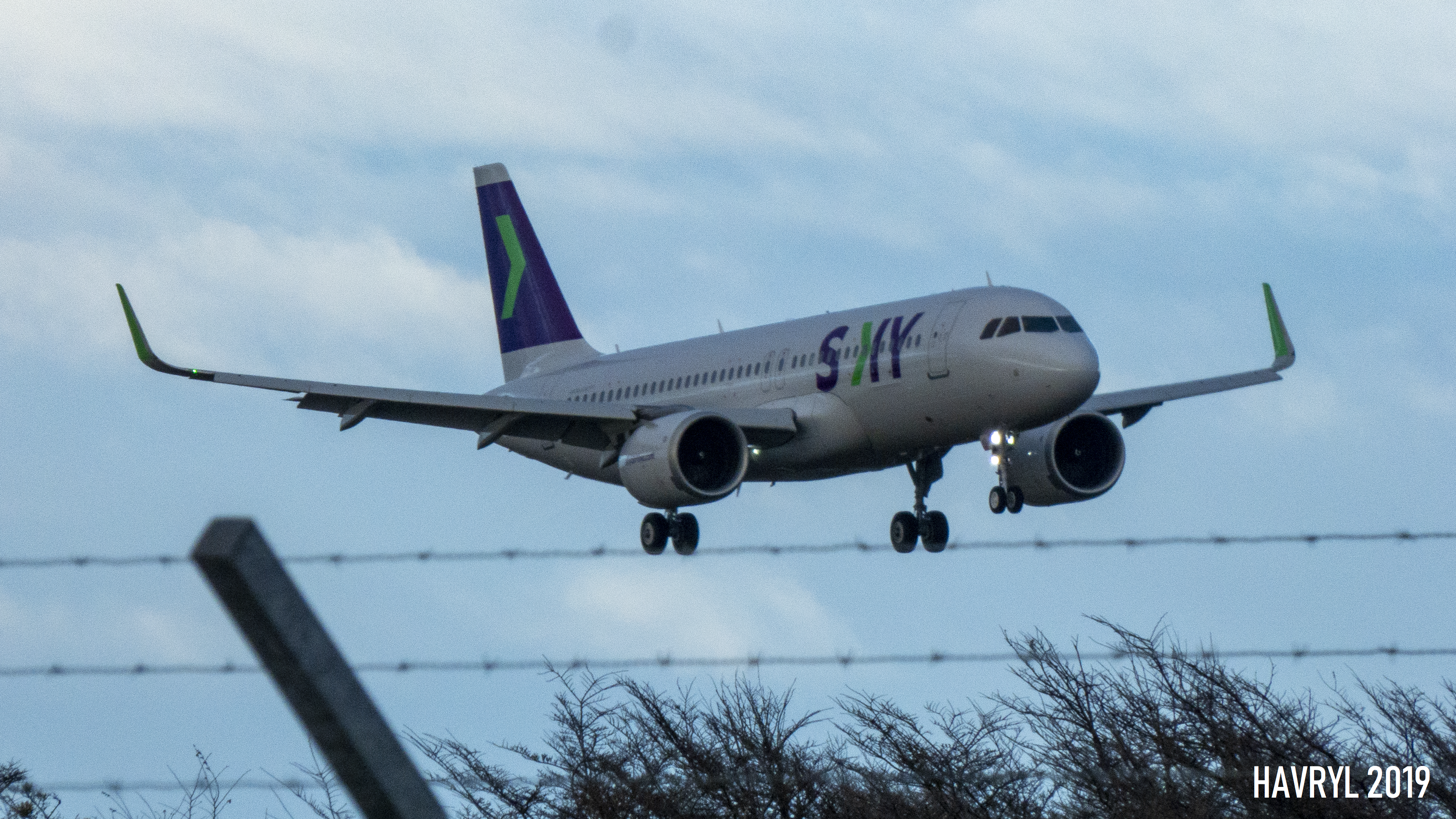
Brand new Sky Airline Airbus A320neo on final approach to Presidente Carlos Ibanez International Airport

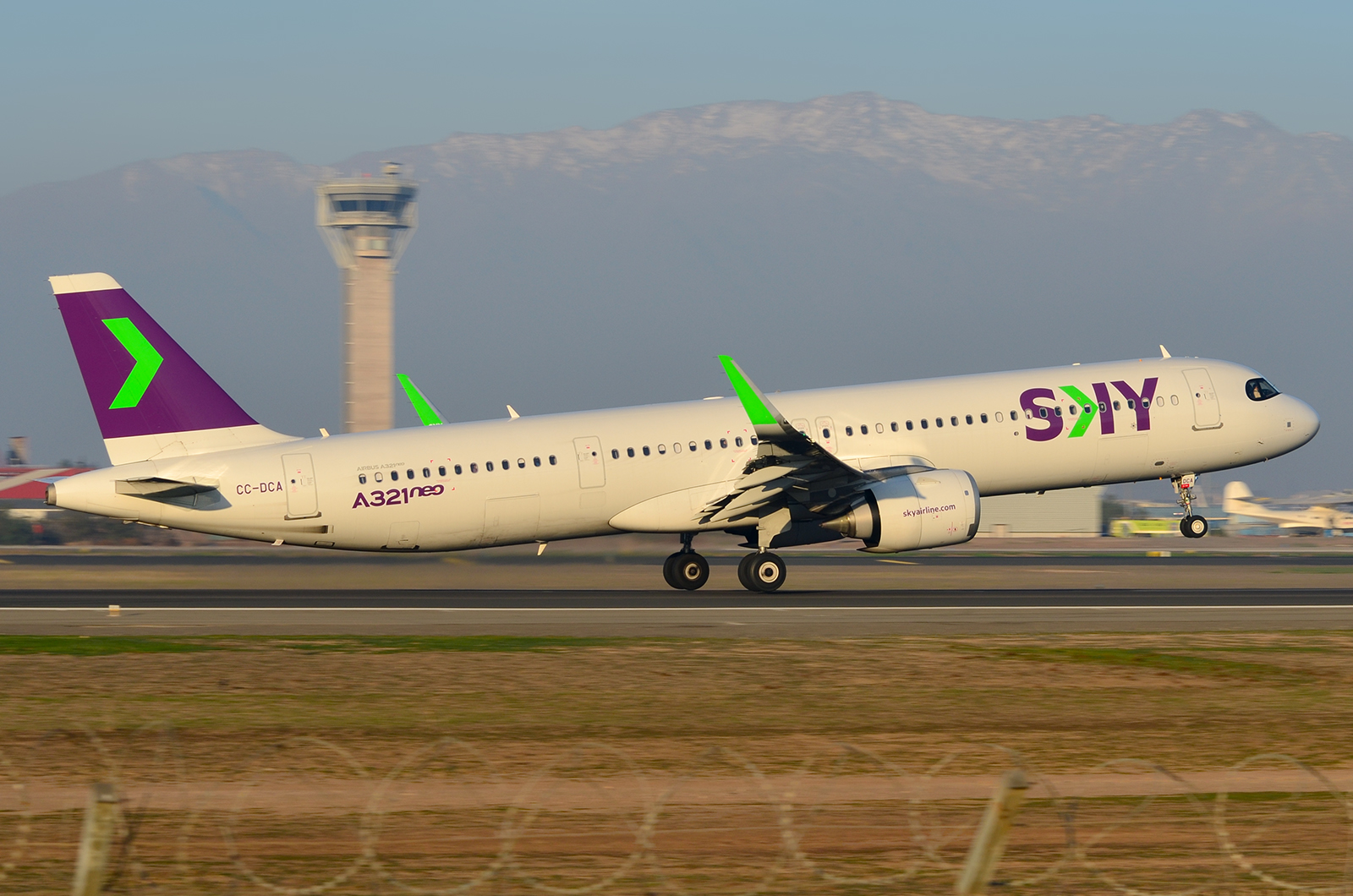
In July 2021, Sky Airline received their first Airbus A321neo

=== Former fleet ===
Since its beginnings, Sky Airline operated an all-Boeing 737 fleet; these began to be replaced by Airbus A320 family aircraft in 2010 and were fully withdrawn in 2013.

Sky Airline historical fleet
Aircraft	Introduced	Retired
Boeing 737-200	2001	2013
Boeing 737-300	2008	2008
Airbus A319-100	2013	2020
Airbus A320-200	2010	2019

== Incidents and accidents ==
- On July 18, 2012, at 5:08 PM local time, a Sky Airline Flight SKU 101, operated by a Boeing 737-200 Advanced, registration CC-CRQ, with 115 passengers and 6 crew members on board, en route from Antofagasta Cerro Moreno Airport to La Serena-La Florida Airport, aborted landing at La Serena touching the runway with its right hand wing, suffering substantial damage to the wing tip and flap fairing. The plane safely landed at Copiapó-Chamonate Airport at 5:47 PM with no injuries. Visibility conditions at La Serena were rapidly deteriorating at the time of the approach, but still good enough for a safe landing (6000 m. visibility). The plane was subsequently repaired.
- On October 14, 2015, a passenger on board SKU 112, an Airbus A319, filmed part of the plane's left engine cowling coming off as it took off from Santiago Airport en route to Chamonate Airport. The plane immediately returned to Santiago Airport and landed safely. No passengers were injured. A similar incident with the A319 had happened previously on a British Airways flight departing Heathrow Airport.
