= AeroUnion Flight 302 =

2010 aviation accident in Mexico

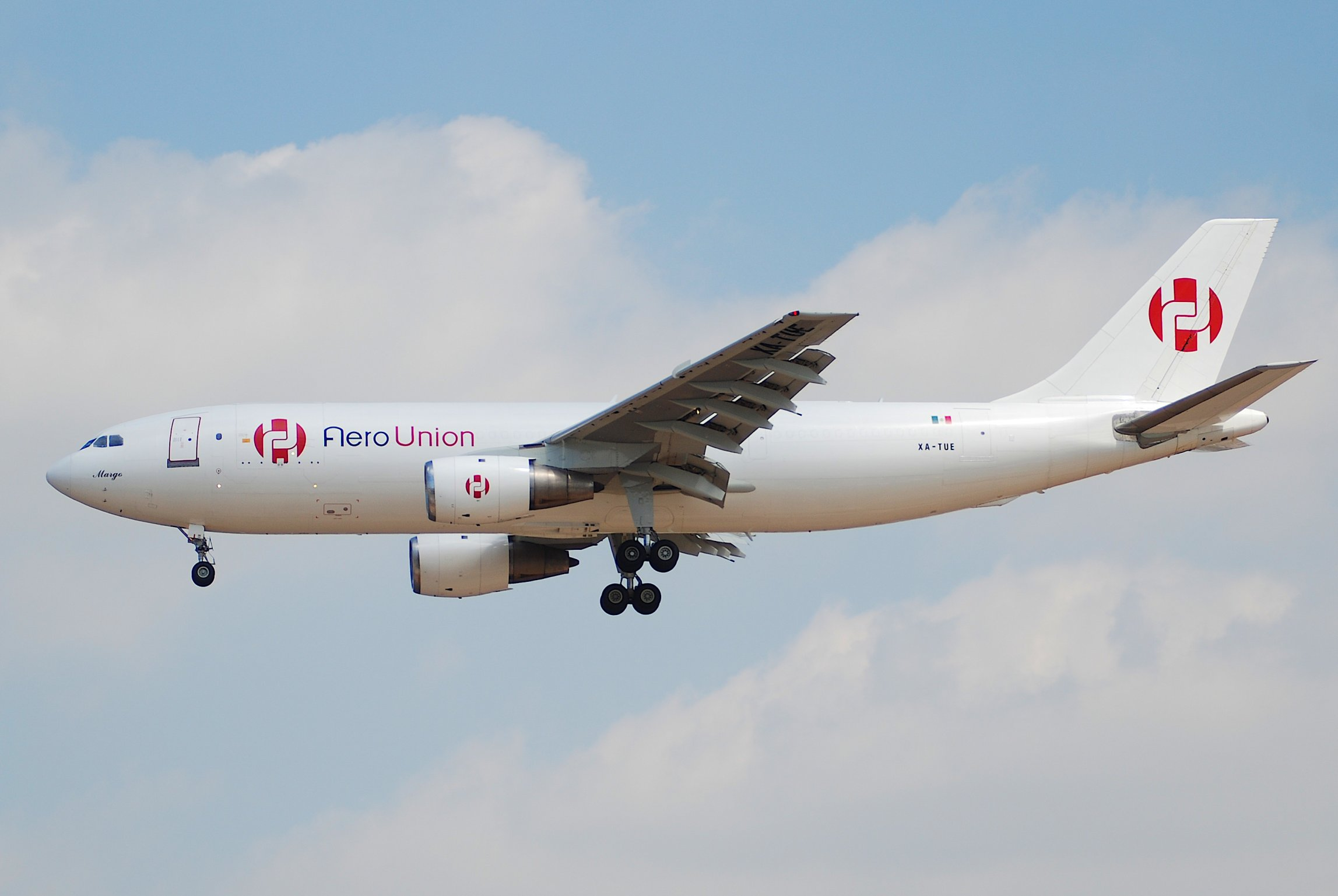
- XA-TUE, the aircraft involved in the accident, pictured in 2007

Accident
- Date: 13 April 2010
- Summary: Stall on approach caused by pilot error
- Site: near Monterrey International Airport, Monterrey, Mexico; 25°46′57.26″N 100°07′36.67″W
- Total fatalities: 6

Aircraft
- Aircraft type: Airbus A300B4-203F
- Aircraft name: Margo
- Operator: AeroUnion
- IATA flight No.: 6R302
- ICAO flight No.: TNO302
- Call sign: AEROUNION 302
- Registration: XA-TUE
- Flight origin: Mexico City International Airport, Mexico City, Mexico
- Stopover: Monterrey International Airport, Monterrey, Mexico
- Destination: Los Angeles International Airport, Los Angeles, United States
- Occupants: 5
- Passengers: 0
- Crew: 5
- Fatalities: 5
- Survivors: 0

Ground casualties
- Ground fatalities: 1

AeroUnion Flight 302, operated by an Airbus A300 cargo aircraft, crashed in poor weather on final approach at Monterrey International Airport, Monterrey, Mexico around 23:18 CDT on 13 April 2010, after a flight from Mexico City. All five people on board were killed, as well as one on the ground.

== Aircraft and crew involved ==
The aircraft involved was built in 1979 and after service with a number of operators was leased to Aerounión – Aerotransporte de Carga Unión (as of 2025, Avianca Cargo Mexico) in April 2002 and registered as XA-TUE. At the time of the accident, the aircraft had flown for 55,200 hours and made 27,600 landings.

The captain was 56-year-old Adolfo Muller Pazos, who had 16,754 flight hours, including 5,446 hours on the Airbus A300. The first officer was 37-year-old José Manuel Guerra, who had 3,114 flight hours, with 1,994 of them on the Airbus A300. The flight engineer was 34-year-old Humberto Castillo Vera, who had 3,038 flight hours, 1,461 of them on the Airbus A300. Also on board was an observer pilot, 25-year-old Manfred Muller, who had 206 flight hours, and 36-year-old aircraft technician Érick Guzmán.

== Accident ==
At about 23:18 local time on 13 April (04:18 UTC on 14 April), AeroUnion Flight 302 executed a missed approach after a landing attempt and crashed. The Airbus A300B4-203F was on a scheduled international freight service from Mexico City International Airport via Monterrey International Airport, Monterrey, to Los Angeles International Airport, Los Angeles. The crew had been cleared to land the aircraft on runway 11 at Mariano Escobedo Airport, but it crashed onto the Avenida Miguel Alemán motorway, almost two kilometres (1.2 mi) short of the runway threshold. It struck a car, killing the driver. The airplane broke up and burst into flames. All five occupants of the aircraft were killed.

There was a storm that caused windshear and heavy rain, with a ceiling varying between 500 and 800 feet (150 and 240 m). The METAR in force at the time of the accident stated visibility of 7 miles (11 km) with light rain. Cloud cover was "broken" at 2,500 feet (760 m), overcast at 5,000 feet (1,500 m). with intra-cloud lightning observed.

== Investigation ==
The Direction General of Civil Aeronautics (DGAC) of the Ministry of Communications and Transportation of Mexico (SCT) opened an investigation into the accident. Assistance was provided by Airbus, the aircraft's manufacturer; and by France's aircraft accident investigation body, the Bureau of Enquiry and Analysis for Civil Aviation Safety (BEA).

The investigation noted that on final approach the speed decreased to 110 knots (200 km/h; 130 mph) (more than 20 knots (37 km/h; 23 mph) below typical final approach speed) followed by the crew pulling the control column which resulted in further speed decay and increased angle of attack. The stick shaker, stall warning and Alpha Floor protection activated and caused the engines to accelerate to maximum thrust. In response to the pitch up momentum produced by the accelerating engines, the control column was pushed forward, however the trim was at 10.25 degrees nose up and was not adjusted. The aircraft pitched up reaching an angle of attack of 41 degrees, the speed decayed to 70 knots (130 km/h; 81 mph), the stick shaker and stall warning activated again, the control column was at its forward stop, and the aircraft began to descend. During the last 10 seconds of flight the control column was reversed to its backward stop while the aircraft was losing height until impact.

== See also ==
- China Airlines Flight 140, another Airbus A300 that stalled on approach in Japan due to pilot error.
- China Airlines Flight 676, another Airbus A300 that stalled on approach in Taiwan due to pilot error.
- Colgan Air Flight 3407
- Air France Flight 447
- Turkish Airlines Flight 1951
- United Express Flight 6291
- Indonesia AirAsia Flight 8501
