= Wamos Air =

Spanish airline

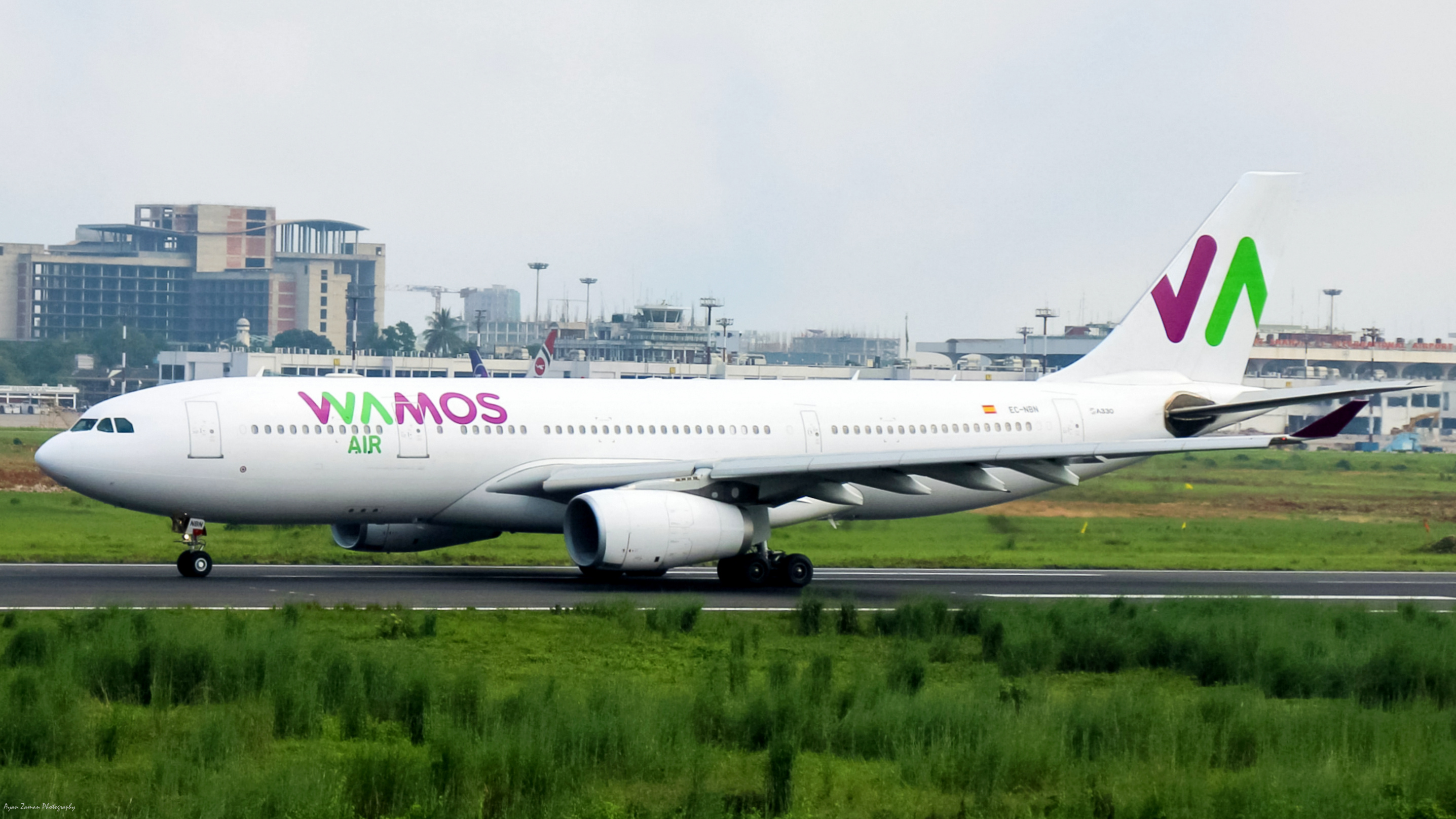
- A Wamos Air Airbus A330
IATA	ICAO	Call sign
EB	PLM	PULLMAN
- Founded: 23 June 2003; 23 years ago
- Hubs: Madrid–Barajas Airport
- Fleet size: 13
- Destinations: Charter
- Parent company: Abra Group
- Headquarters: Piovera, Madrid, Spain
- Key people: Enrique Saiz (CEO)
- Website: wamosair.com

Wamos Air, formerly named Pullmantur Air, is a Spanish charter airline headquartered in Madrid. It mostly operates leisure charter flights from its main base at Adolfo Suárez Madrid–Barajas Airport and also operates aircraft for other entities.

== History ==
In 2014, former majority owner Royal Caribbean Group (which also owned now-defunct Pullmantur Cruises) sold an 81% stake of Pullmantur Air to investor Springwater Capital, which subsequently led to a rebrand to Wamos Air.

In 2022, Wamos Air announced it would end all scheduled services to focus solely on passenger and cargo charter and ACMI operations. The airline did serve few destinations throughout the Caribbean, which were subsequently handed over to Iberojet.

From 15 November 2022 to 30 April 2024, Wamos Air operated the Auckland - Perth route daily using their own aircraft, the A330-200, as well as their own crew and pilots, on behalf of Air New Zealand.

From 1 June 2024, Wamos Air will operate two Airbus A330-200s from Manila to Sydney and Melbourne on behalf of Philippine Airlines for a five-month period due to supply chain issues.

On 16 October 2024, Wamos Air was acquired by the holding company Abra Group, which also owns Avianca and Gol Linhas Aéreas.

Currently, Wamos Air is operating flights for Air Europa on the Madrid (MAD) - New York (JFK) route as well as scheduled flights for Iberia to different destinations from Madrid Barajas Airport. TAP Portugal is also being served by Wamos Air on the Lisbon - Fortaleza route.

== Destinations ==
=== Charter ===
Wamos Air offers short and long-term charter operations as well as ACMI services for passenger and cargo flights to other airlines such as Condor, tour operators and other businesses such as sports clubs. One of its major customers had been its now-defunct sister company Pullmantur Cruises.

In 2021 and 2022, Wamos Air had set up Tallinn Airport as its technical stopover between Asia and North America cargo routes.

=== Former scheduled destinations ===
As of December 2019, Wamos Air offered scheduled flights under its own brand name to the following destinations, which have all since been terminated.

Country	City	Airport	Notes	Refs
Cuba	Varadero	Juan Gualberto Gómez Airport		
Dominican Republic	Punta Cana	Punta Cana International Airport		
Mexico	Cancún	Cancún International Airport		
Panama	Panama City	Tocumen International Airport		
Spain	Madrid	Adolfo Suárez Madrid–Barajas Airport	Hub	
United States	Miami	Miami International Airport		

== Fleet ==
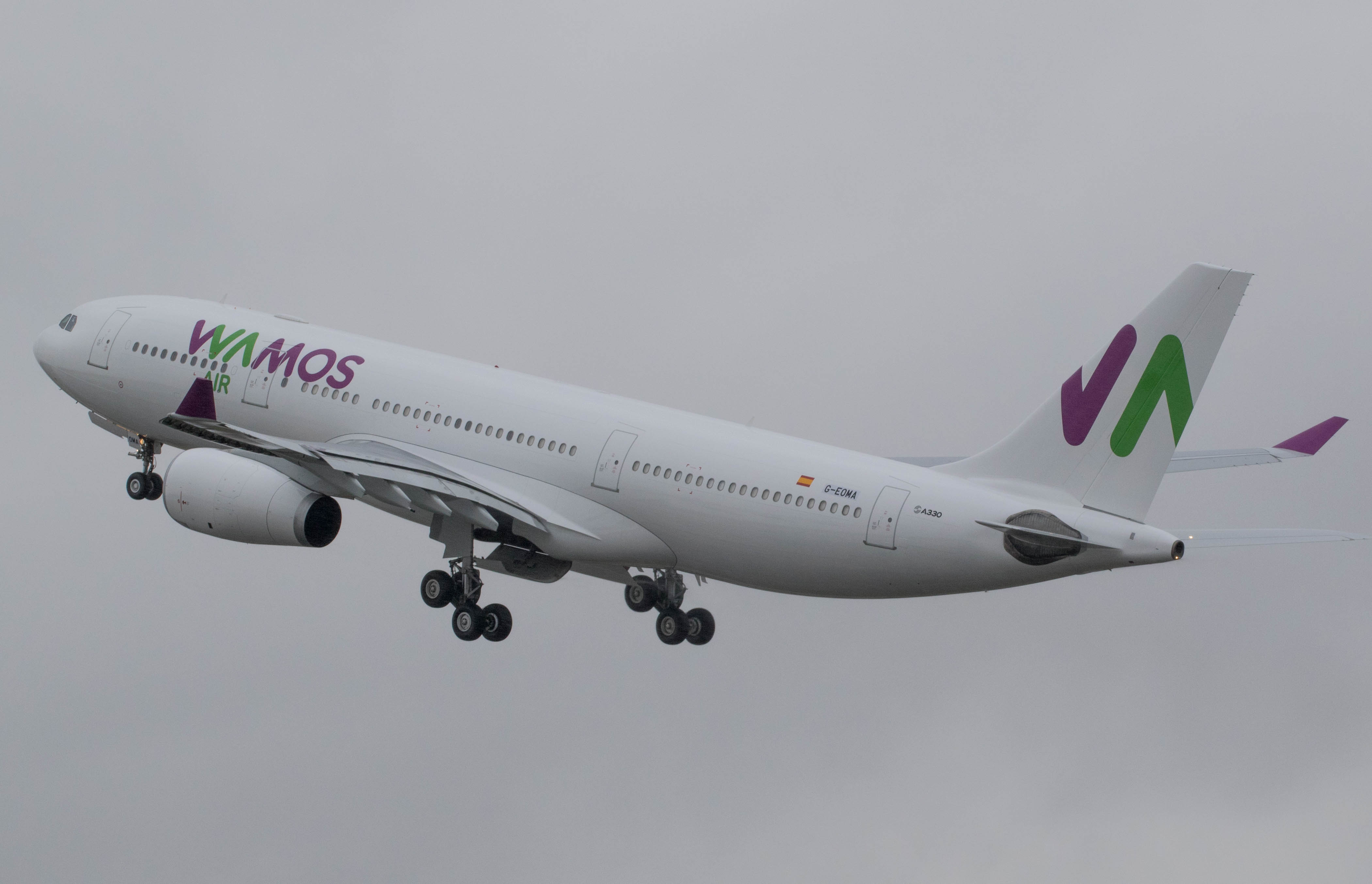
Wamos Air A330-200

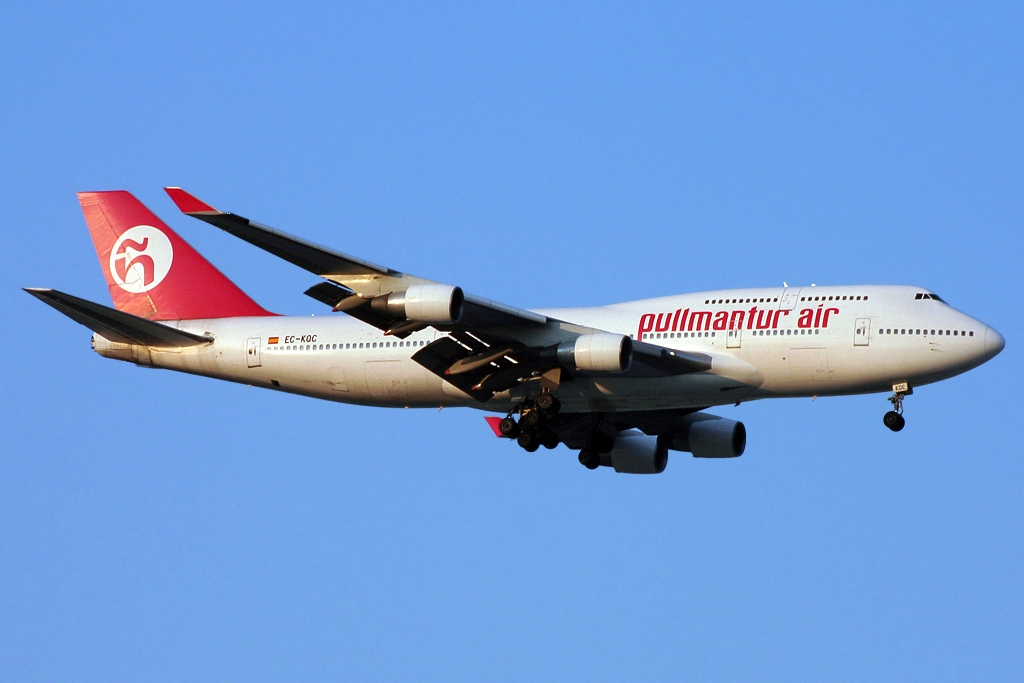
A former Pullmantur Air Boeing 747-400 in the 2003 livery

=== Current fleet ===
As of August 2025, Wamos Air operates the following aircraft:

Type	In fleet	Orders	Passengers		
Type	In fleet	Orders	C	Y	Total
Airbus A330-200	5	—	20	260	280
Airbus A330-200	5	—	20	268	288
Airbus A330-200	5	—	24	273	297
Airbus A330-300	8	—	30	255	285
Airbus A330-300	8	—	12	374	386
Airbus A330-300	8	—	6	385	391
Airbus A330-300	8	—	—	408	408
Total	13	—			

== See also ==
- List of airlines of Spain
