= Avianca Cargo México =

Mexican cargo airline

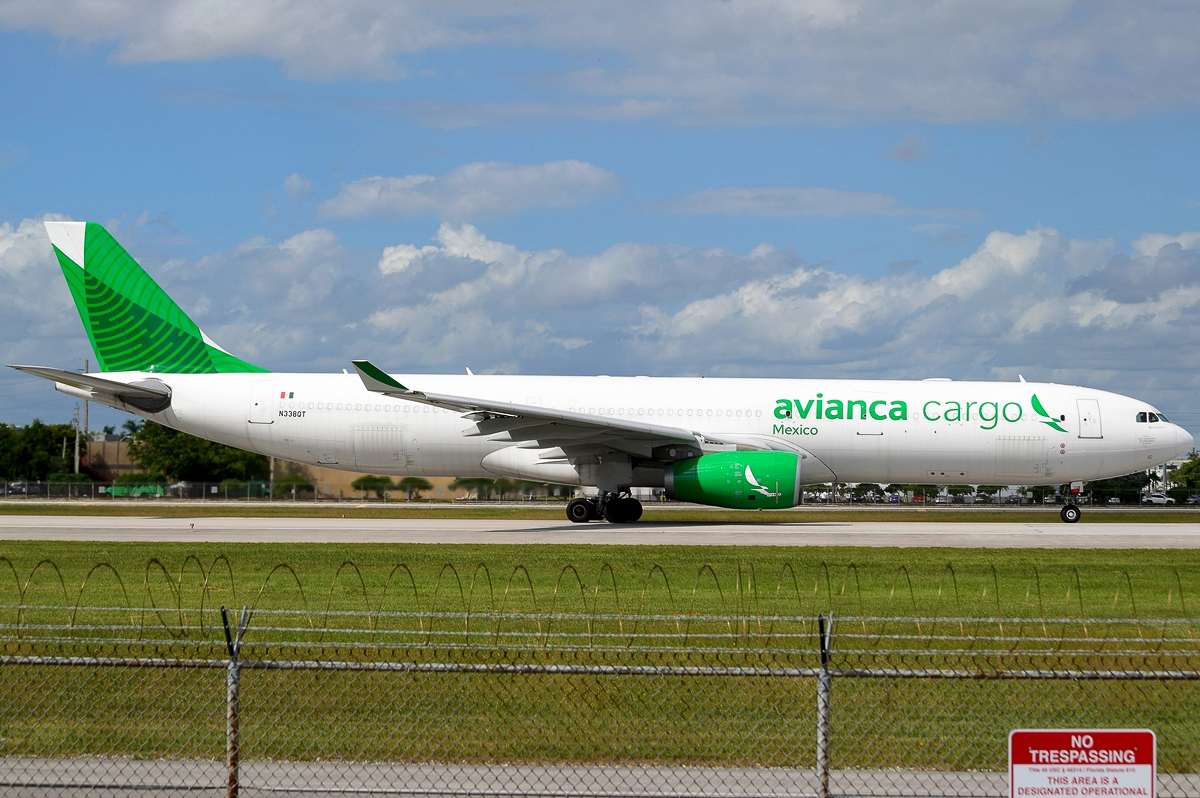
IATA	ICAO	Call sign
6R	TNO	AEROUNION
- Founded: March 5, 1998; 28 years ago
- Commenced operations: July 2001; 25 years ago (as AeroUnion)
- Hubs: Felipe Ángeles International Airport
- Secondary hubs: Los Angeles International Airport
- Fleet size: 2
- Destinations: 12
- Parent company: Avianca Cargo
- Headquarters: Mexico City, Mexico
- Key people: Danilo Correa (CEO)
- Website: aerounion.com.mx

Aerotransporte de Carga Unión S.A. de C.V., operating as Avianca Cargo México and formerly known as AeroUnion, is a scheduled cargo airline headquartered in Hangar Zone G at Mexico City International Airport in Mexico City, Mexico. It operates cargo services within and between Mexico and the United States.

== History ==
The airline was founded on March 5, 1998, as AeroUnion. It was not until November 2000 that an application to the United States Department of Transportation for the right to carry cargo between the United States and Mexico was filed. Flight operations were launched in July 2001, with services to the Los Angeles key market being commenced on January 21, 2006.

On March 11, 2014, Avianca Holdings announced that its subsidiary Avianca Cargo had entered into an agreement to acquire 100% of the non-voting shares and 25% of the voting shares of AeroUnion.

On May 10, 2020, Avianca filed for Chapter 11 bankruptcy in the United States after failing to pay bondholders, becoming one of the major airlines to file for bankruptcy due to the COVID-19 pandemic crisis.

On June 24, 2025, AeroUnion was rebranded as Avianca Cargo México.

== Destinations ==
Avianca Cargo Mexico, formerly AeroUnion, operates the following scheduled services:

Country	City	Airport	Notes	Refs
Colombia	Bogotá	El Dorado International Airport	Offered by Avianca Cargo	
Colombia	Medellín	José María Córdova International Airport	Offered by Avianca Cargo	
Costa Rica	San José	Juan Santamaría International Airport		
Guatemala	Guatemala City	La Aurora International Airport		
Mexico	Guadalajara	Guadalajara International Airport		
Mexico	Mérida	Mérida International Airport		
Mexico	Mexico City	Mexico City International Airport	Terminated	
Mexico	Mexico City	Felipe Ángeles International Airport	Hub	
Mexico	Tijuana	Tijuana International Airport		
United States	Chicago	O'Hare International Airport		
United States	Los Angeles	Los Angeles International Airport	Hub	
United States	Miami	Miami International Airport		
United States	New York	John F. Kennedy International Airport		

== Fleet ==
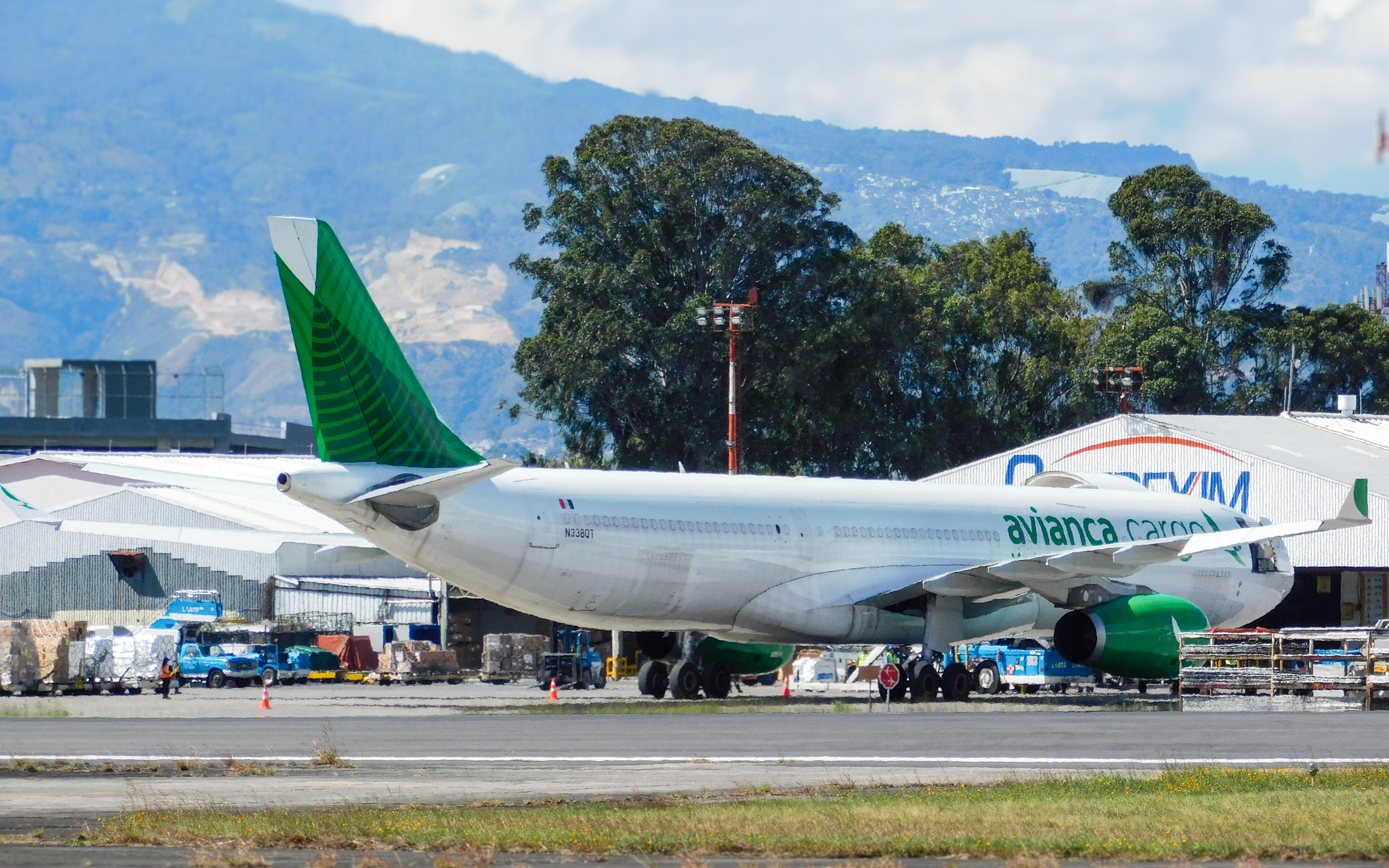
An Airbus A330 airplane.

=== Current ===
TAs of August 2025, Avianca Cargo México operates the following aircraft:

Avianca Cargo México fleet
Aircraft	In service	Orders	Notes
Airbus A330-300P2F	2	2	
Total	2	2	

=== Former ===
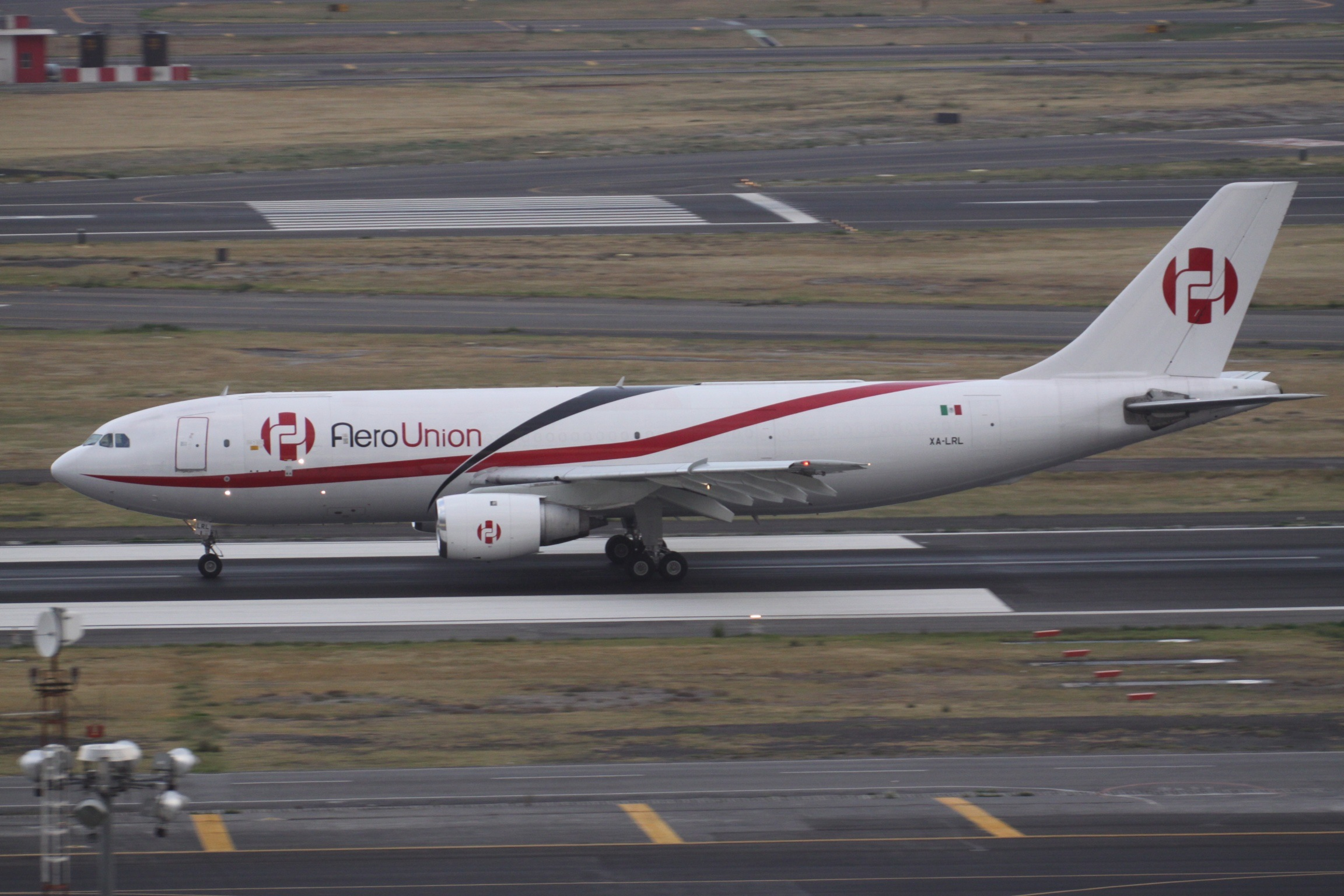
A former AeroUnion Airbus A300B4F at Mexico City International Airport in 2010

The airline previously operated the following aircraft:

AeroUnion former fleet
Aircraft	Total	Introduced	Retired	Notes
Airbus A300B4F	7	2001	2019	
Airbus A300-600RF	3	2017	2024	
Boeing 767-200ER/BDSF	2	2014	2024	

== Accidents and incidents ==
- On April 13, 2010, AeroUnion Flight 302, from Mexico City to Monterrey, crashed during landing approach on a highway near Monterrey International Airport, killing all five people on board, as well as a driver in a car that was hit by the airplane.
- On October 27, 2016, an Airbus A300B4F (registered XA-MRC), operating from Mexico City International Airport to Guadalajara International Airport, had to make an emergency landing at the Santa Lucía Air Force Base due to a fire in the turbine. Upon landing, the 10 crew members were helped by various rescue teams. There were no injuries.
- On December 10, 2018, the same A300B4F, XA-MRC, suffered a nose gear collapse while being towed across the ramp in the maintenance area of Mexico City International Airport.

== See also ==
- List of active mexican airlines
- Lists of airlines
