= Avianca Cargo =

Cargo airline based in Medellín, Colombia

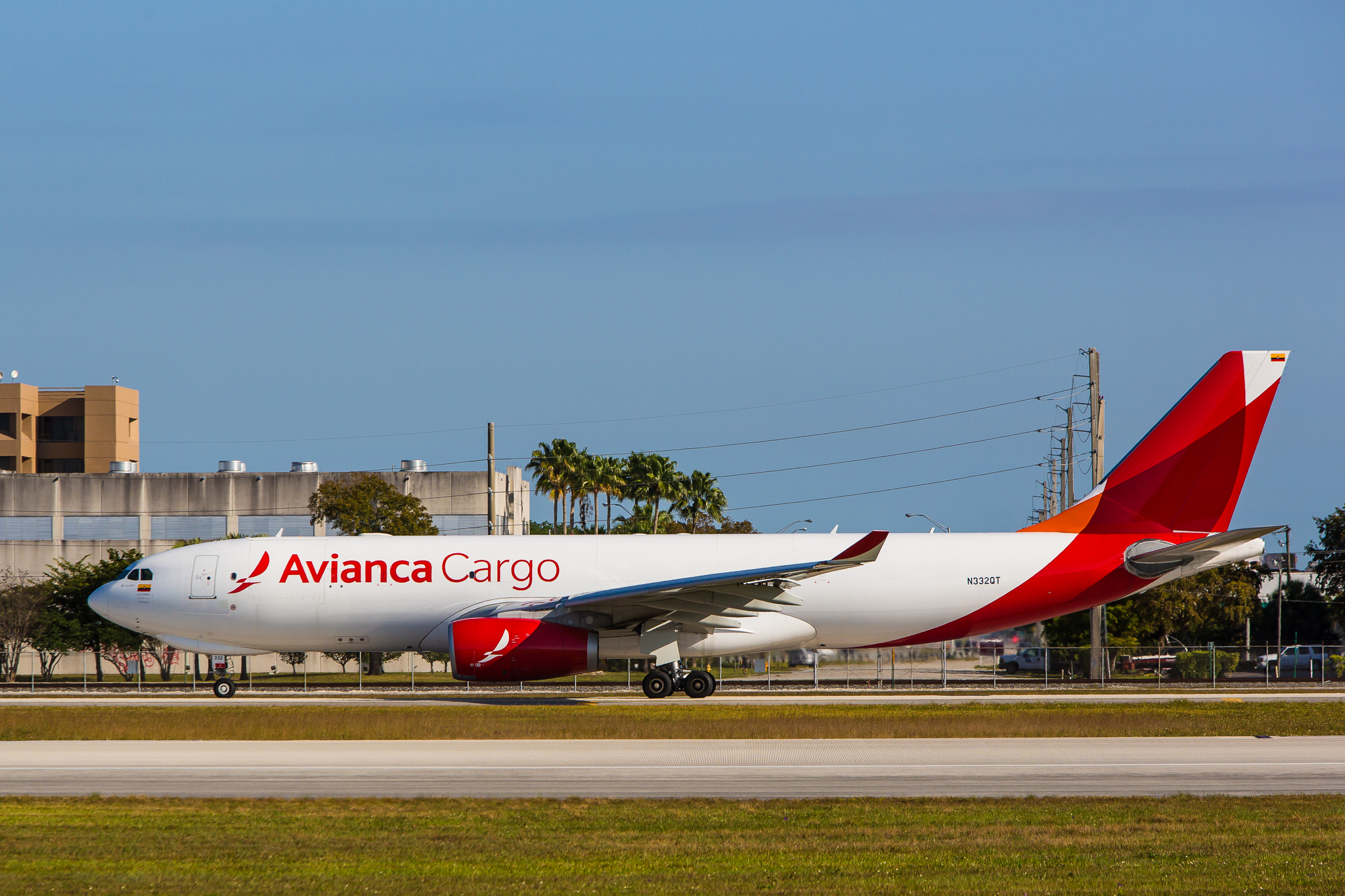
IATA	ICAO	Call sign
QT	TPA	TAMPA
- Founded: March 11, 1973; 53 years ago (as Tampa Cargo)
- Commenced operations: May 28, 2013; 13 years ago (as Avianca Cargo)
- Hubs: Bogotá
- Secondary hubs: Medellín–JMC; Miami
- Subsidiaries: AeroUnion
- Fleet size: 6
- Destinations: 26
- Parent company: Avianca Group
- Headquarters: Medellín, Colombia
- Key people: Gabriel Oliva (CEO)
- Founders: Luís H. Coulson; Capt. Juan Fernando Mesa; Capt. Orlando Botero Escobar; Capt. Anibal Obando Echeverri
- Website: www.aviancacargo.com

Avianca Cargo (formerly Tampa Cargo - Transportes Aereos Mercantiles PanAmericanos S.A.) is a cargo airline based at José María Córdova International Airport in Medellín, Colombia. It is an all-cargo airline transporting flowers from Latin America to Miami, as well as general cargo throughout the Americas.

== History ==
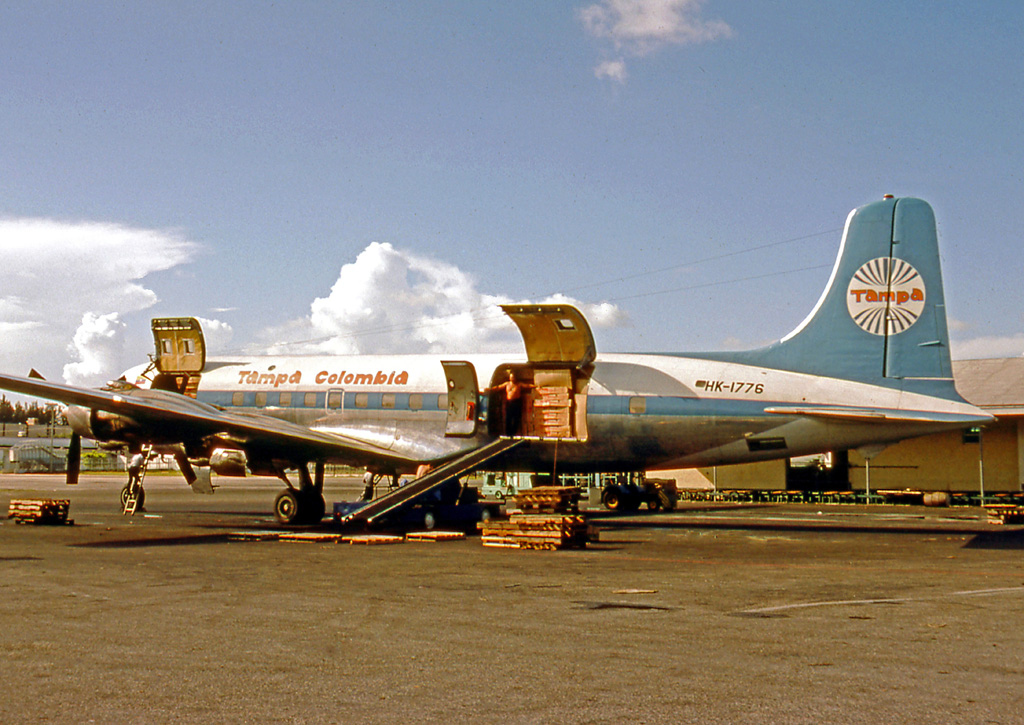
A Tampa Cargo Douglas DC-6A at Miami International Airport in 1975

The airline was established on March 11, 1973, as TAMPA Cargo, by Luís H. Coulson, Captain Juan Fernando Mesa, Captain Orlando Botero Escobar, and Captain Anibal Obando Echeverri. It commenced operations with a Douglas DC-6A, which formed part of the initial acquired fleet. These were retired in the early 1980s.

After overcoming several crises due to drug trafficking problems in one of its aircraft, in 1988, Tampa Cargo decided to renew its fleet by bringing Douglas DC-8s with the most modern technology of its time, including GPS positioning systems and CFM engines.

Martinair signed an agreement to acquire a 40% stake in Tampa Cargo in 1996, which was later increased to 58% in 2003.

On July 26, 2003, the company inaugurated its Maintenance Hangar in Rionegro-Antioquia, and the new route to Peru was placed in operation that same year. In September 2004, Tampa Cargo started its fleet renovation by incorporating the Boeing 767-200ER.

Avianca acquired a 100% stake in Tampa Cargo in July 2008.

On February 1, 2010, Tampa Cargo was advised that after concluding the regulatory approval and the approval of competencies required to concrete the union announced in October 2009, Synergy Group, the owner of Avianca, and Kingsland Holding Limited, the owner of Grupo TACA, signed the Agreement through which the closing that started up the strategic union of their businesses was made official, and that the name of the strategic union was AviancaTaca Holding. Then, the holding created the Cargo Vice-Presidency to which Tampa Cargo and its cargo aircraft fleet belong, naming Tampa Cargo the administrator of the Avianca and Taca commercial aircraft capacity.

On September 27, 2011, Avianca ordered four Airbus A330-200Fs to replace the existing Tampa Cargo fleet, with deliveries to commence in December 2012. This made Tampa Cargo the first A330F operator in Latin America.

The airline was rebranded as Avianca Cargo on May 28, 2013.

On May 10, 2020, Avianca filed for Chapter 11 bankruptcy in the United States after failing to pay bondholders, becoming one of the major airlines to file for bankruptcy due to the COVID-19 pandemic crisis.

== Destinations ==
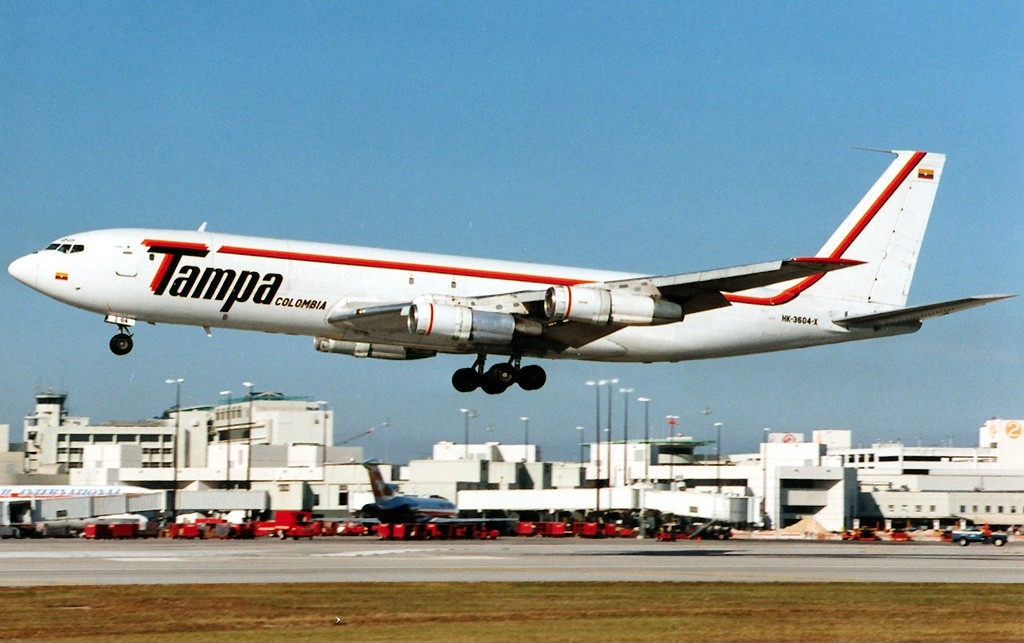
A Tampa Cargo Boeing 707-320C at Miami International Airport in 1992

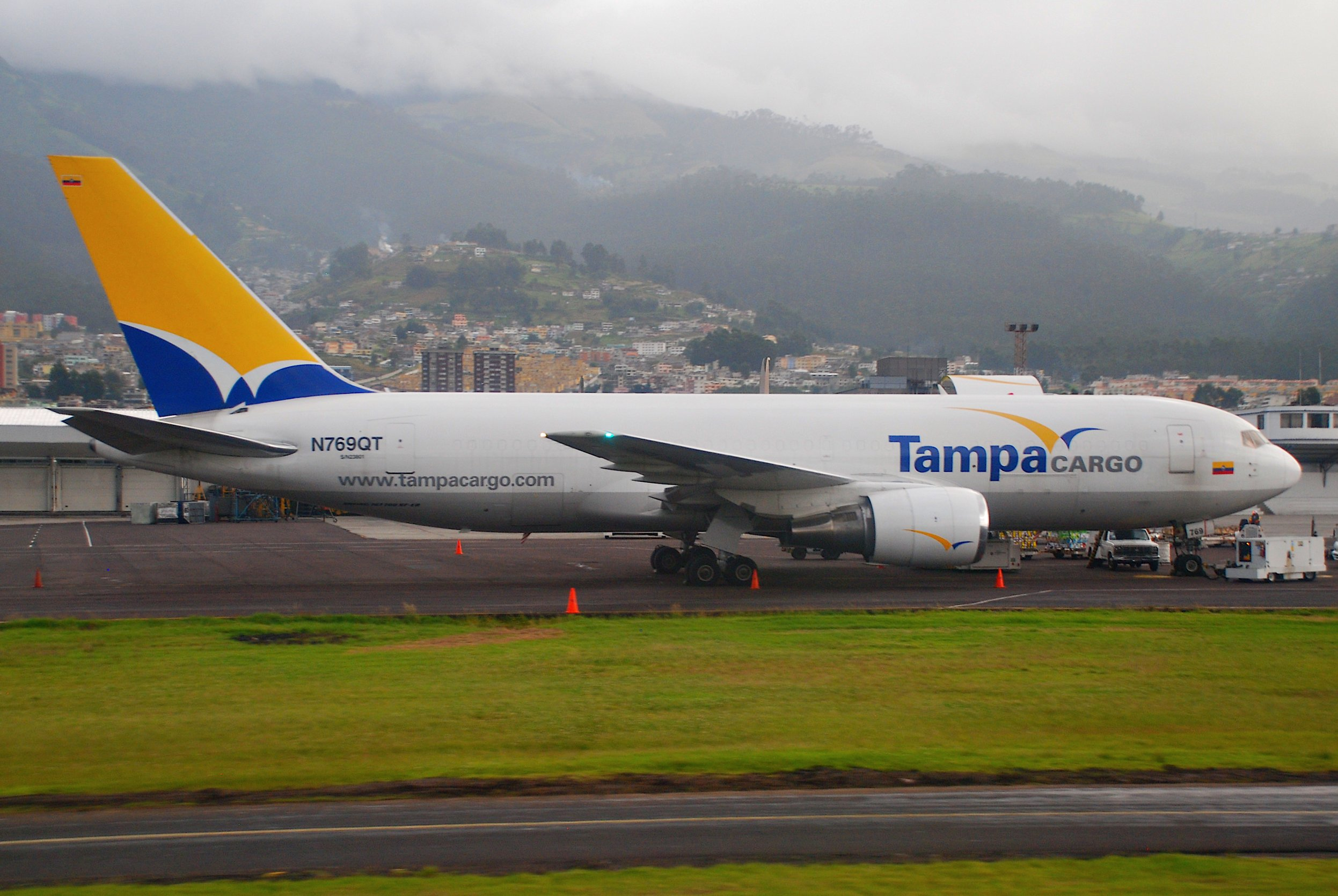
A Tampa Cargo Boeing 767-200ER/BDSF at the Old Mariscal Sucre International Airport in 2008

Avianca Cargo operates to the following destinations:

Country	City	Airport	Notes	Refs
Argentina	Buenos Aires	Ministro Pistarini International Airport		
Brazil	Campinas	Viracopos International Airport		
Brazil	Curitiba	Afonso Pena International Airport		
Brazil	Florianópolis	Hercílio Luz International Airport		
Brazil	Manaus	Eduardo Gomes International Airport		
Brazil	São Paulo	São Paulo/Guarulhos International Airport		
Brazil	Vitória	Eurico de Aguiar Salles Airport		
Chile	Santiago	Arturo Merino Benítez International Airport		
Colombia	Barranquilla	Ernesto Cortissoz International Airport		
Colombia	Bogotá	El Dorado International Airport	Hub	
Colombia	Medellín	José María Córdova International Airport	Hub	
Dominican Republic	Santo Domingo	Las Américas International Airport		
Ecuador	Guayaquil	José Joaquín de Olmedo International Airport		
Ecuador	Quito	Mariscal Sucre International Airport		
El Salvador	San Salvador	El Salvador International Airport		
Guatemala	Guatemala City	La Aurora International Airport		
Mexico	Guadalajara	Guadalajara International Airport		
Mexico	Monterrey	Monterrey International Airport		
Mexico	Mexico City	Mexico City International Airport		
Nicaragua	Managua	Augusto C. Sandino International Airport		
Panama	Panama City	Tocumen International Airport		
Paraguay	Asunción	Silvio Pettirossi International Airport		
Paraguay	Ciudad del Este	Guaraní International Airport		
Peru	Lima	Jorge Chávez International Airport		
United States	Los Angeles	Los Angeles International Airport		
United States	Miami	Miami International Airport	Hub	
Uruguay	Montevideo	Carrasco International Airport		
Venezuela	Caracas	Simón Bolívar International Airport		

== Fleet ==
=== Current ===
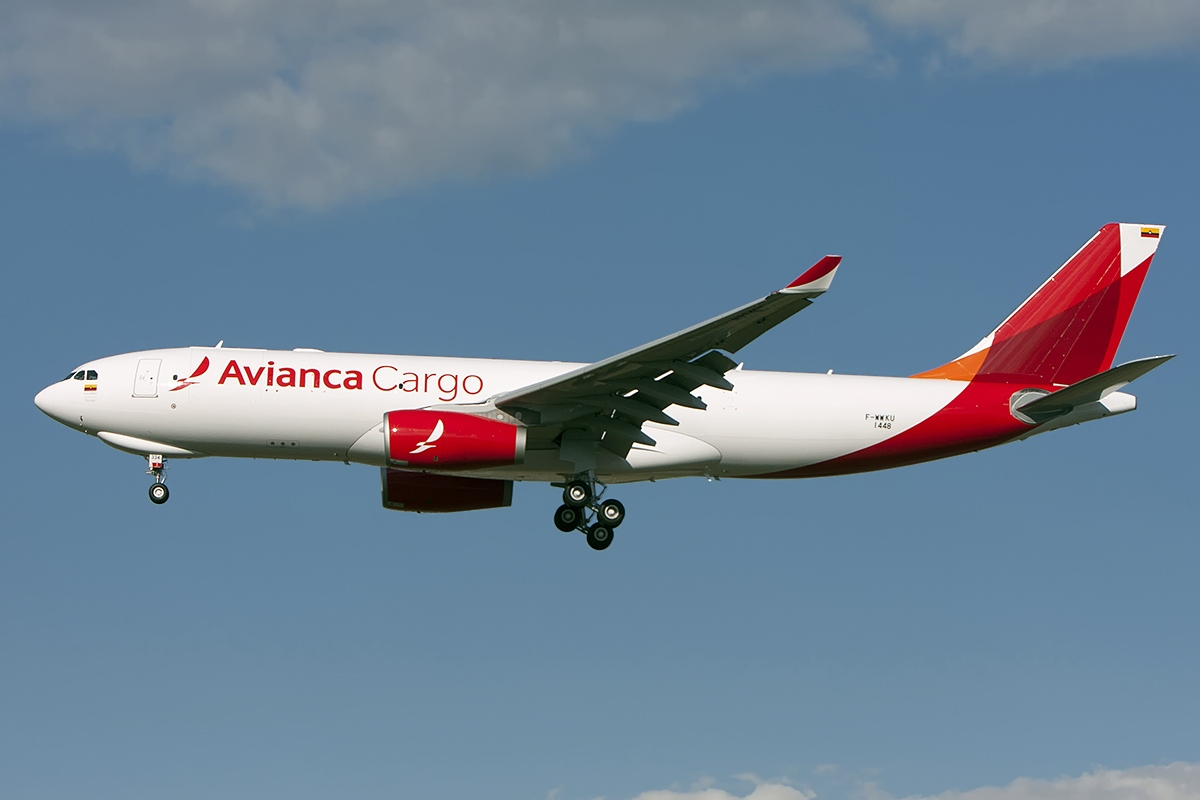
Avianca Cargo Airbus A330-200F, 2013

As of July 2026, Avianca Cargo operates the following aircraft:

Avianca Cargo fleet
Aircraft	In service	Orders	Notes
Airbus A330-200F	6	—	
Airbus A330-200P2F	—	2	To be converted from 2024 to 2025.
Airbus A330-300P2F	—	2	To be converted from 2024 to 2025.
Total	6	4	

=== Former ===
As of August 2025, Avianca Cargo operated 6 Airbus A330-200F.

The airline also previously operated the following aircraft:

Avianca Cargo former fleet
Aircraft	Total	Introduced	Retired	Notes
Boeing 707-320C	8	1979	1999	
Boeing 767-200ER/BDSF	6	2004	2014	
Boeing 767-300ERF	1	2011	2015	Transferred to All Nippon Airways
Canadair CL-44	1	1985	1986	Leased from Líneas Aéreas Suramericanas
Douglas DC-6A	1	1975	1982	
Douglas DC-6B	1	1973	1982	
Douglas DC-8-55CF	1	1992	1992	Leased from Agro Air
Douglas DC-8-63F	1	1989	1991	
Douglas DC-8-71F	5	1992	2007	

== Accidents and incidents ==
- On December 14, 1983, a Boeing 707-320C (registered HK-2401X) crashed into a factory after taking off from Medellín's Olaya Herrera Airport. The cause of the accident was a failure of engines 3 and 4 by foreign objects during the initial ascent. All 3 crew members on board died, plus 22 on the ground.

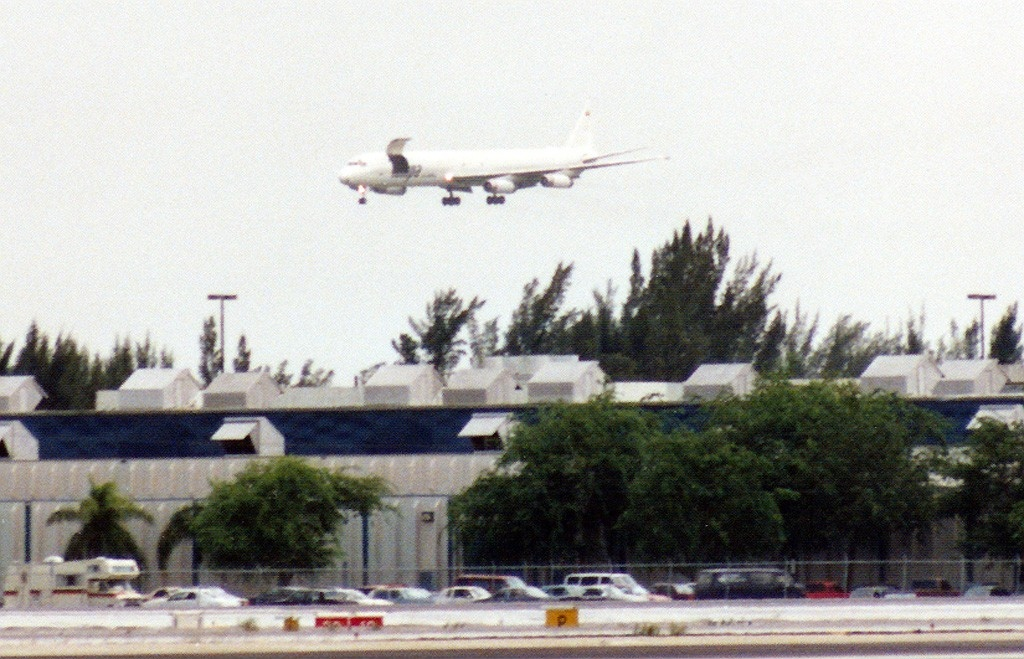
The DC-8-63F, HK-3490X, returning to Miami International Airport after its cargo door opened

- On July 14, 1989, a Douglas DC-8-63F (registered HK-3490X) took off from Miami International Airport, when the main cargo door opened shortly after. The aircraft returned to the airport and landed safely.
- On October 9, 1994, a Boeing 707-320C (registered HK-3355X) was flying from São Paulo to Santa Cruz de la Sierra. When climbing, the second hydraulic pump light of the engine 3 illuminated. The leak couldn't be stopped and the aircraft returned to São Paulo. The nosegear didn't extend and the main gear didn't lock down and the aircraft slid during the emergency landing. None of the 5 occupants on board were killed.
- On February 4, 2007, a Douglas DC-8-71F (registered HK-4277), operating a cargo flight to Miami, veered to the right during landing approach. The pilot thought it may have been due to a crosswind, but he soon realized that the right main landing gear had collapsed. The NTSB post-accident investigation later determined that the aircraft's landing gear had collapsed due to improper torque of a landing gear lockbolt by company maintenance personnel during landing gear installation. None of the 3 occupants on board were killed, while the aircraft was damaged beyond repair.

== See also ==
- List of airlines of Colombia
