= Avianca Express =

Regional airline of Colombia

IATA	ICAO	Call sign
EX	AVR	AVIANCA EXPRESS
- Founded: December 2018; 7 years ago
- Commenced operations: March 1, 2019; 7 years ago
- Hubs: El Dorado International Airport
- Frequent-flyer program: LifeMiles
- Alliance: Star Alliance (affiliate)
- Fleet size: 12
- Destinations: 10
- Parent company: Avianca Group
- Headquarters: Bogotá, Colombia
- Key people: Santiago Diago (CEO)
- Website: www.avianca.com/en/

Avianca Express (legally Regional Express Américas S.A.S.) is a Colombian regional airline founded in December 2018. It is owned by Avianca Group and is being phased in, as of spring 2019, as part of the adjustment plan for its operating model and in search of more profitability and efficiency.

== History ==
The peculiarity of Avianca Holdings' then-new strategy is that flights are not routed through an airline hub, but from point-to-point. In return, Avianca gradually withdrew from regional centers and intended to serve only important national and international destinations in the future.

Flight operations were carried out exclusively with a fleet of ATR 72-600s, a twin-engine turboprop aircraft that fits with regional airports with shorter runways and a more limited aviation infrastructure. Avianca Holdings received Aerocivil's air traffic approval for the Colombian regional market in February 2018.

From March 1, 2019, the airline embarked on regional routes from Bogotá to cities such as Manizales, Florencia, Villavicencio, Yopal, Neiva, Ibagué, and Popayán; and also from Cali to Pasto and Tumaco. Since August 2019, it also flies between Bucaramanga and Cartagena.

The airline, previously known under its working title Regional Express Américas, received its final name Avianca Express in mid-February 2020.

On March 30, 2020, Avianca Express started operating at Olaya Herrera Airport in Medellín, which Avianca had not served in 20 years, with connections to Quibdó, Montería and Bucaramanga. Apart from this, a new flight plan came into force, which included improvements to connections to and from Bogotá, and also a new connection to Barrancabermeja.

On May 10, 2020, Avianca filed for Chapter 11 bankruptcy in the United States after failing to pay bondholders, becoming one of the major airlines to file for bankruptcy due to the COVID-19 pandemic crisis.

== Destinations ==
As of June 2023, the following destinations are served by Avianca Express:

Country	City	Airport	Notes	Refs
Colombia	Armenia	El Edén International Airport	Terminated	
Colombia	Bogotá	El Dorado International Airport	Hub	
Colombia	Barrancabermeja	Yariguíes Airport		
Colombia	Bucaramanga	Palonegro International Airport		
Colombia	Cartagena	Rafael Núñez International Airport		
Colombia	Corozal	Las Brujas Airport		
Colombia	Cúcuta	Camilo Daza International Airport	Terminated	
Colombia	Florencia	Gustavo Artunduaga Paredes Airport		
Colombia	Ibagué	Perales Airport		
Colombia	Manizales	La Nubia Airport	Terminated	
Colombia	Medellín	Olaya Herrera Airport	Terminated	
Colombia	Neiva	Benito Salas Airport		
Colombia	Popayán	Guillermo León Valencia Airport		
Colombia	Quibdó	El Caraño Airport	Terminated	
Colombia	Tumaco	La Florida Airport	Terminated	
Colombia	Villavicencio	La Vanguardia Airport		
Colombia	Yopal	El Alcaraván Airport		

== Fleet ==
=== Current fleet ===
As of July 2026, Avianca Express operates the following aircraft:

Avianca Express fleet
Aircraft	In service	Orders	Passengers				Notes
Aircraft	In service	Orders	W	Y+	Y	Total	Notes
Airbus A320	12	—	12	60	108	180	
Total	12	—					

=== Former fleet ===
As of August 2025, Avianca Express operated 4 Airbus A320

Avianca Express previously also operated the following aircraft:

Avianca Express former fleet
Aircraft	Total	Introduced	Retired	Notes
Airbus A319-100	1	2022	2023	
ATR 72-600	11	2019	2022	

== Accidents and incidents ==
- On September 7, 2019, an ATR 72-600 (registered HK-5041) suffered a tailstrike on landing at La Nubia Airport. The aircraft landed and rolled out normally to its parking position. All 49 passengers and 5 crew members were uninjured.

== See also ==
- List of airlines of the Americas
- List of airlines of Colombia
- List of regional airlines
