= Helicol =

Helicopter airline of Colombia

Helicol (Helicópteros Nacionales de Colombia)
IATA	ICAO	Call sign
—	HEL	HELICOL
- Founded: July 3, 1955; 71 years ago
- Operating bases: El Dorado International Airport
- Fleet size: See below
- Parent company: Volar Colombia
- Headquarters: Bogotá, Colombia
- Website: www.new.helicol.com.co

Helicol S.A.S. (Spanish acronym: Helicopteros Nacionales de Colombia) is a helicopter operator based at El Dorado International Airport in Bogotá, Colombia.

== History ==
Helicol was founded on July 3, 1955, in response to the needs of the oil exploration activities in Colombia. Initially, it was a joint venture between Philadelphia, Pennsylvania based Keystone Helicopters Corporation, and Avianca; as Keystone had signed a contract with Shell Oil Company to run oil exploration activities in the north side of the Country. To comply with the air laws in force at the time, Keystone sought a Colombian partner to take control of 51% of the company's shares, a role Avianca filled. It was the creation of the first non-regular air services supplier in Colombia.

Three Bell 47G helicopters leased from Keystone became the initial fleet, and Mr. Alberto Farías Mendoza, an important Avianca executive, was appointed as the first general manager. Similar contracts were signed shortly afterwards, and by 1957, the fleet grew to 6 helicopters. Between 1961 and 1963, crop-dusting activities in helicopters were also performed, and in 1964, Helicol was hired by the Texas Petroleum and Gulf Oil Company to build the trans-Andean pipeline between the town of Orito in Putumayo Department and Tumaco, on the Pacific Ocean in Colombia, using the Bell 204s. The tasks required lifting heavy metallic tubes and locating them in the trace of the pipeline, through irregular terrain. Similar work was performed in Ecuador in 1969, in the construction of the Trans-Ecuadorean pipeline, and in Peru in 1970. Even former Vietnam pilots did not succeed in flying the Bell 204 machines the way Colombians did. Additional services were also conducted in El Salvador, Guatemala, and Nicaragua, in Central America. By this time, the company was fully owned by Avianca.

In 1978, business jet service was introduced with the use of IAI 1124 Westwinds, becoming the first type of such to operate in Colombia. At that time, the company had established a maintenance center in Barranquilla where it carried out piston-engine repair and overhaul, as well as maintenance support for Bell helicopters, authorized by the manufacturer for the Air Forces of Argentina and Panama. By 1980, Helicol was the largest helicopter operator in Latin America, serving in other activities in Colombia, such as mining, power lines, and hydroelectric dam construction.

In 1979, four de Havilland Canada DHC-6 Twin Otters were put in service for the coal mining activities conducted at La Guajira, as well as for the oil industry. Helicol also supplied ground and flight crews for the operation of two de Havilland Canada Dash 7, owned by Drummond Company, the winner of the rights to exploit the biggest open-sky coal mines in the world. Other operations conducted by Helicol on behalf of third parties included the Health Services of the Antioquia Department Bell 206, as well as the Caracol news helicopter. In 1981, Helicol leased 2 Grumman Gulfstream I aircraft from North American Air Service, which were later purchased to cover contracts signed with the Colombian Central Bank for transport needs. Two additional G-1s were also leased to complement the first two of the type.

Besides the 47G model, other Bell Helicopters were also flown by Helicol until around 1984. Between August 1982 and May 1985, an Arava 201 was leased to provide support to the different oil and mining activities performed by U.S., Canadian, and British companies in the Country. A Bell 214ST helicopter was also introduced in the mid-80s.

The advent of at least 12 Russian-built Mil Mi-8 and Mil Mi-17, and French Aerospatiale AS350B and AS355F1, allowed Helicol to expand its activities and by 1994, it offered a helicopter link service between the downtown Medellín and the airport, located in the top of an 8,000-ft mountain, until one of the Bell 212s used was hijacked.

By 1996, the main shareholder, Avianca, decided that it was required to reorganize the company, and the MI-8 and AS350B were all sold. The Twin Otters were transferred to the sister company SAM, and since the Westwind fleet was already sold a few years earlier, a Cessna Citation III was sold to Helicol.

On December 10, 2004, Avianca concluded a major reorganization process, undertaken after filing for Chapter 11 bankruptcy protection, by obtaining confirmation of its reorganization plan, which was financially backed by the Brazilian consortium, Synergy Group and the National Federation of Coffee Growers of Colombia, allowing the airline to obtain funds for US$63 million in the 13 months following its withdrawal from bankruptcy. After the purchase of Avianca by the Synergy Group, Helicol's acquisition followed in 2007. By 2008, the Beechcraft 1900D were also added to its downsized fleet, these last to be operated by the sister company Petroleum Aviation Services (PAS).

In December 2013, Helicol integrated PAS's operations, strengthening its position in non-scheduled passenger and cargo transportation.

Helicol filed for insolvency in 2019 due to financial difficulties caused by heavy pension liabilities. In November 2023, creditors and regulators approved Helicol's reorganization agreement, and was acquired by helicopter operator Volar Colombia. On November 6, 2026, the Superintendency of Corporations declared Helicol's reorganization agreement legally ineffective due to unresolved pension obligations. This gave the company two months to secure the missing transport to avoid judicial liquidation.

== Operations ==
95% of Helicol's operations are onshore.

- Support facilities and supervision of electrical networks
- Air Ambulance and Search and Rescue
- Offshore Operations
- Firefighting
- (Bambi bucket) Support for rescue operations
- Seismic study with long and short lines
- Executive Transportation
- Cargo Transport
- Pipeline Construction and Maintenance
- Oil Exploration and Drilling

== Fleet ==
Helicol operates a fleet of both helicopters and fixed-wing aircraft.

- 4 Beechcraft 1900D (as of July 2026)
- Bell 412SP
- Bell 412EP

== See also ==
- List of airlines of Colombia
- Helicopteros Nacionales de Colombia, S. A. v. Hall, a United States Supreme Court decision in which Helicol was a party.
