= 2025 in aviation =

The following aviation-related events occurred in the year 2025.

== Events ==
=== January ===
28 January
Boom Technology's XB-1 demonstrator successfully went supersonic, achieving a speed of Mach 1.1.

An Airbus A321 operating as Air Busan Flight 391 caught fire shortly before takeoff from Gimhae International Airport in Busan, South Korea. All 176 people on board evacuated safely, with only 7 people suffering minor injuries.

29 January
A Beechcraft 1900 operated by Light Air Services crashed shortly after takeoff from Unity oilfield in South Sudan; 20 of the 21 people on board died.

A Bombardier CRJ700 operating as American Airlines Flight 5342 collided with a United States Army Sikorsky UH-60 Black Hawk helicopter. The CRJ700 was attempting to land at Ronald Reagan Washington National Airport. Both aircraft crashed into the Potomac River after the collision. This was the first major aircraft accident in the United States in 16 years. All 64 people on board the CRJ700 and all 3 on the helicopter died.

31 January
A Learjet 55 operating as Med Jets Flight 056 crashed into a residential area of Philadelphia, Pennsylvania, shortly after takeoff. A total of eight people (all six onboard, two on the ground) died and an explosion set multiple houses on fire. At least 23 other people on the ground were injured, one of whom later succumbed to their injuries.

=== February ===
3 February
ITA Airways began the process of integration into the Lufthansa group and left the SkyTeam alliance.

6 February
A Cessna 208 Caravan operating as Bering Air Flight 445 from Unalakleet to Nome, Alaska disappeared off radar 10 minutes before its scheduled arrival at Nome. The wreckage of the aircraft was found 34 miles from Nome, and all 10 people onboard the aircraft died.

10–14 February
The Aero India Airshow took place at Bengaluru, India.
14–16 February
The Buckeye Air Fair and AOPA Fly In took place at Buckeye, Arizona.
17 February
A Bombardier CRJ900 operating as Delta Connection Flight 4819 crashed and overturned on landing at Toronto Pearson International Airport. All 80 occupants on board survived the accident, with 21 injured.

=== March ===
6 March
Two General Dynamics F-16 Fighting Falcon jets operated by the Republic of Korea Air Force accidentally dropped eight Mark 82 bombs on a village in Pocheon, Gyeonggi Province, South Korea. Twenty-nine civilians and 14 soldiers were injured.
17 March
A British Aerospace Jetstream, operated by Lanhsa Airlines as Flight 018, crashed into the sea at Juan Manuel Gálvez International Airport; 12 of the 17 people on board died. Honduran musician Aurelio Martínez was among the dead.
20 March
An electrical substation near Heathrow Airport caught fire and led to a 16-hour closure of the airport, disrupting global travel.
25–30 March
The Australian International Airshow was originally scheduled to be held from 25 to 30 March at Avalon Airport in Geelong, Australia. An accident on 28 March led to the cancellation of the rest of that day's events. The airshow continued as scheduled without any further incidents.
28 March
Mandalay International Airport and Nay Pyi Taw International Airport were heavily damaged by a violent earthquake in Myanmar. At Mandalay International Airport, ceilings collapsed and the basement was damaged, while at the Nay Pyi Taw International Airport, a runway and two aircraft were damaged and an air traffic control tower collapsed; all six staff died. Thailand, which was also affected by the earthquake, issued a nationwide no-fly order for all airports.

=== April ===
1–6 April
The Sun n' Fun Aerospace Expo was held at Lakeland Linder International Airport in Lakeland, Florida.

10 April
A Bell 206 helicopter experienced an in-flight breakup and crashed into the Hudson River during a New York City sightseeing flight. The pilot and a family of five passengers died.

17 April
A Cessna 208 operated by Tropic Air as Tropic Air Flight 711 was hijacked during a domestic flight in Belize. Two passengers and a pilot were stabbed by the hijacker, who was shot dead by one of the injured passengers.

24 April
Aerobatic pilot Rob Holland died when his MX Aircraft MXS crashed on approach into Langley Air Force Base in Virginia, USA.

28 April
Hundreds of flights were delayed and cancelled after a power outage across the Iberian Peninsula, with Lisbon, Porto, Faro in Portugal, and Barcelona and Madrid-Barajas in Spain, being some of the major airports affected. Faro and Porto airport would both later switch to generator power.

=== May ===
3 May
A cargo Boeing 737-290C Advanced operated by IBM Airlines was destroyed at Nyala Airport by the Sudanese Armed Forces (SAF) during the Sudanese civil war. All 20 or 90 occupants on board the aircraft died.

8 May
Vlora International Airport in Vlorë, Albania, opened.

14 May
Qatar Airways signed a $96-billion order for 130 Boeing 787 Dreamliner and 30 Boeing 777X aircraft, with options for a further 50 aircraft. This was reportedly Boeing's largest-ever wide-body order.

15 May
Global Airlines, a British startup airline, conducted its inaugural flight from Glasgow to New York. The airline plans to operate an all-A380 fleet.

20 May
American airline SeaPort Airlines commences operations with daily commuter flights between Portland, Oregon and Seattle.

22 May
A Cessna Citation II crashes in a residential area of San Diego, California. All six people on board died.

=== June ===
3 June
The European Union banned all Surinamese and Tanzanian airlines due to "not meeting international aviation standards".

11 June
Syrian airline Fly Cham commences operations, replacing Cham Wings Airlines.

12 June
A Boeing 787 Dreamliner operating as Air India Flight 171 crashed shortly after takeoff from Ahmedabad Airport, India. All except one of the 242 people on board, as well as 19 people on the ground died. This was the 787's first fatal accident, hull loss, and the deadliest accident in 2025.

16–22 June
The Paris Air Show was held at Le Bourget. Much of the show was focused on defence, though few new products were announced. Airbus recorded orders totalling over $20 billion, while Boeing remained quiet in the wake of Air India Flight 171.

23 June
In the wake of the United States's missile strikes on Iran, and the subsequent retaliation of Iran, several North American, European, and Asian airlines suspended their flights to the Middle East, and Qatar and the UAE closed their airspace.

30 June
Oman Air, the flag carrier of Oman, joins the Oneworld alliance.

=== July ===
8 July
A 2,000 ha (4,900 acres) wildfire forced Marseille Provence Airport in Marseille, France, to close after it sent plumes of smoke into the sky, causing the airport to close its runways shortly after midday and cancel at least ten flights. The airport's website showed cancelled departures, including to Brussels, Munich and Naples.

15 July
Barkol Dahe Airport in Barkol Kazakh Autonomous County, China, is opened.

18–20 July
The Royal International Air Tattoo was held at RAF Fairford in Gloucestershire, United Kingdom

18 July
Civil and military dual-use Lishui Airport in Lishui, China, is opened.

21 July
A Chengdu J-7 trainer operated by the Bangladesh Air Force crashes into a school shortly after takeoff. The pilot and 35 people on the ground died.

24 July
An Antonov An-24 operating as Angara Airlines Flight 2311 crashed on final approach during its second landing attempt at Tynda Airport in Amur Oblast, Russia. All 42 passengers and 6 crew died.

21–27 July
The EAA AirVenture Oshkosh was held at Wittman Regional Airport and Pioneer Airport in Oshkosh, Wisconsin.

=== August ===
6 August
A Harbin Z-9 operated by the Ghana Air Force crashed on a forested mountainside in Ashanti Region, Ghana, while traveling to Obuasi for an event to tackle illegal mining. All five passengers and three crew died, including Defence Minister Edward Omane Boamah, Environment and Science Minister Ibrahim Murtala Muhammed, and Samuel Sarpong.

13–19 August
Ten thousand Air Canada flight attendants go on strike over failure to negotiate a new collective bargaining agreement, causing flight cancellations and affecting 130,000 passengers per day.

30 August – 1 September
The Canadian International Air Show was held at Toronto, Canada, at the Canadian National Exhibition.

=== September ===
4 September
Caribbean Airlines temporarily suspended all flights between Trinidad, Trinidad and Tobago, and Caracas, Venezuela, for the entire month due to tensions between the United States and Venezuela.

Singapore becomes the first country to declare turbulence as a major in-flight threat after severe turbulence was experienced on Singapore Airlines Flight 321 resulting in one death and injuring another 104 people in 2024.

8 September
Phnom Penh International Airport is closed and replaced by Techo International Airport in Phnom Penh, Cambodia.

18–27 September
The Saudi National Day air shows were held in Jeddah from 18 to 20 September, Riyadh from 22 to 23 September and Khobar on 26 to 27 September.

20–21 September
The 2025 NAS Oceana Air Show took place at Naval Air Station Oceana in Virginia Beach, Virginia.

21 September
A cyberattack caused delays at Heathrow Airport, Brussels Airport, and Brandenburg Airport.

22 September
Hong Kong International Airport suspended all passenger flights for 36 hours, affecting thousands of flights in the longest suspension of flights ever carried out at the airport as Typhoon Ragasa made landfall. Taiwan also cancelled flights as well as ferry services.
Drone sightings led authorities in Denmark and Norway to close the main airports in Copenhagen and Oslo for several hours overnight, causing widespread flight disruptions.

26–28 September
The Oregon International Air Show was held at McMinnville, Oregon.

28 September
Ganzhou Ruijin Airport in Ruijin, China, is opened.

=== October ===
8 October
Indian international airport Navi Mumbai International Airport is opened by prime minister Narendra Modi in Ulwe, Maharashtra.

15 October
Vietnamese airline Sun PhuQuoc Airways commences operations.

20 October
Emirates SkyCargo Flight 9788, a Boeing 747-400F, suffered a runway excursion while landing at Hong Kong International Airport, Hong Kong SAR, striking a ground vehicle and crashing into the sea. The two people inside of the vehicle died, whereas the four occupants on the 747 survived.

26 October
Saudi Arabian airline Riyadh Air commences operations.

28 October
A Cessna 208 Caravan operating as Mombasa Air Safari Flight 203 crashed in a hilly area near Kwale, Kwale County, Kenya; all 11 occupants died.

=== November ===
4 November
A UPS Airlines McDonnell Douglas MD-11, operating as UPS Airlines Flight 2976, crashed shortly after takeoff from Louisville Muhammad Ali International Airport in Louisville, Kentucky, after the left engine separated from the wing during the take-off roll. The 3 crew members and 12 people on the ground died.

11 November
A Lockheed C-130 Hercules operated by the Turkish Air Force crashed near the Azerbaijan–Georgia border. All 20 people on board were killed.

25 November
Republic Airways Holdings and Mesa Air Group completed their merger, combining to form the second-largest regional airline in the United States, and becoming the world's largest operator of the Embraer E-Jet family.

28 November
Flights were disrupted worldwide after some 6000 Airbus A320 family aircraft, representing about half of the global fleet, were grounded to resolve a problem whereby solar radiation could interfere with flight computers. A software update resolved the problem within hours for the majority of the aircraft, though about 900 older aircraft required a replacement computer.

=== December ===
1 December
Hi Fly becomes the first airline to land an Airbus A330 in Antarctica.

1 December–9 December
Indian airline IndiGo experienced one of the largest network-wide service disruptions in its history, resulting in over 2,100 flight cancellations across major airports in India.

9 December
The final Antonov An-22 military transport that was still in operational service crashed into a reservoir in Ivanovo Oblast, Russia, during a test flight after receiving repairs, killing all seven crew members.

A court in Beijing, China, ordered Malaysia Airlines to pay CN¥2.9 million (US$410,000) each to families of eight missing passengers of Malaysia Airlines Flight 370.

18 December
A Cessna Citation II crashed shortly after takeoff from Statesville Regional Airport in Statesville, North Carolina. The aircraft was owned by former NASCAR driver Greg Biffle, who perished in the crash alongside his wife, two children, and three other occupants.

23 December
A Dassault Falcon 50 operating as Harmony Jets Flight 185 crashed shortly after takeoff from Ankara Esenboğa Airport in Ankara, Turkey. All eight people on board were killed, including Libyan Army chief Mohammed Ali Ahmed al-Haddad.

30 December
Ocean Infinity resumes their search for the wreckage of Malaysia Airlines Flight 370 after it was reported missing in 2014, presumably killing all 239 people on board.

== First flights ==
- 29 January – Pipistrel Nuuva V300
- 28 July – Indonesian Aerospace Elang Hitam
- 27 August – General Atomics FQ-42 Dark Merlin
- 15 September – REGENT Viceroy
- 28 October – Lockheed Martin X-59 Quesst
- 31 October – Anduril FQ-44
- 5 December – Gulfstream G300

== Ceased operations ==
A total of 34 airlines ceased operations in 2025.

- 16 January – SKS Airways
- 1 February – Bees Airlines
- 6 February – Air Dilijans
- 7 April – Aerolínea Lanhsa
- 8 April – Ultimate Jet
- 11 April – Loch Lomond Seaplanes
- 16 April – Georgian Wings
- 27 April – Joy Air
- 1 May – OWG
- 28 May – Sunwing Airlines
- 8 June – Cham Wings Airlines
- 11 June – Silver Airways – Vensecar Internacional
- 24 June – Voepass – Mýflug – MAP Linhas Aéreas
- 15 July – DHL Ecuador
- 31 July – Jetstar Asia
- 8 August – Eastern Australia Airlines
- 14 August – Ravn Alaska
- 1 September – Wizz Air Abu Dhabi
- 26 September – Braathens International Airways
- 29 September – Play
- 15 October – Lumiwings – Air China Inner Mongolia
- 27 October – Eastern Airways
- 5 November – Angara Airlines
- 14 November – Blue Islands
- 24 November – SmartLynx Airlines – SmartLynx Airlines Estonia – SmartLynx Airlines Malta
- 26 November – New Pacific Airlines
- 10 December – Air Albania
- 13 December – FlyBig

== Deadliest crash ==
The deadliest crash of both 2025 and the 2020s was Air India Flight 171, which crashed just after takeoff from Ahmedabad Airport in India on 12 June. The crash resulted in the deaths of all but one of the 242 passengers and crew, as well as 19 people on the ground. This is the first recorded fatal crash and the first hull loss of a Boeing 787 Dreamliner.
