= Ivankovo, Russia =

Ivankovo (Russian: Иванково) is the name of several rural localities in Russia.

== Chelyabinsk Oblast ==
As of 2010, one rural locality in Chelyabinsk Oblast bears this name:

- Ivankovo, Chelyabinsk Oblast, a settlement in Drobyshevsky Selsoviet of Troitsky District

== Ivanovo Oblast ==
As of 2010, two rural localities in Ivanovo Oblast bear this name:

- Ivankovo, Furmanovsky District, Ivanovo Oblast, a village in Furmanovsky District
- Ivankovo, Ivanovsky District, Ivanovo Oblast, a village in Ivanovsky District

== Kaluga Oblast ==
As of 2010, two rural localities in Kaluga Oblast bear this name:

- Ivankovo, Meshchovsky District, Kaluga Oblast, a village in Meshchovsky District
- Ivankovo, Zhizdrinsky District, Kaluga Oblast, a village in Zhizdrinsky District

== Kirov Oblast ==
As of 2010, one rural locality in Kirov Oblast bears this name:

- Ivankovo, Kirov Oblast, a village in Vikharevsky Rural Okrug of Kilmezsky District

== Kostroma Oblast ==
As of 2010, three rural localities in Kostroma Oblast bear this name:

- Ivankovo, Nerekhtsky District, Kostroma Oblast, a village in Volzhskoye Settlement of Nerekhtsky District
- Ivankovo, Sudislavsky District, Kostroma Oblast, a village in Sudislavskoye Settlement of Sudislavsky District
- Ivankovo, Vokhomsky District, Kostroma Oblast, a village in Belkovskoye Settlement of Vokhomsky District

== Kurgan Oblast ==
As of 2010, three rural localities in Kurgan Oblast bear this name:

- Ivankovo, Almenevsky District, Kurgan Oblast, a selo in Ivankovsky Selsoviet of Almenevsky District
- Ivankovo, Mishkinsky District, Kurgan Oblast, a selo in Ivankovsky Selsoviet of Mishkinsky District
- Ivankovo, Tselinny District, Kurgan Oblast, a selo in Ivankovsky Selsoviet of Tselinny District

== Novgorod Oblast ==
As of 2010, one rural locality in Novgorod Oblast bears this name:

- Ivankovo, Novgorod Oblast, a village in Fedorkovskoye Settlement of Parfinsky District

== Perm Krai ==
As of 2010, one rural locality in Perm Krai bears this name:

- Ivankovo, Perm Krai, a village in Suksunsky District

== Pskov Oblast ==
As of 2010, one rural locality in Pskov Oblast bears this name:

- Ivankovo, Pskov Oblast, a village in Opochetsky District

== Ryazan Oblast ==
As of 2010, three rural localities in Ryazan Oblast bear this name:

- Ivankovo, Klepikovsky District, Ryazan Oblast, a village in Malakhovsky Rural Okrug of Klepikovsky District
- Ivankovo, Spassky District, Ryazan Oblast, a selo in Ivankovsky Rural Okrug of Spassky District
- Ivankovo, Yermishinsky District, Ryazan Oblast, a village in Turmadeyevsky Rural Okrug of Yermishinsky District

== Smolensk Oblast ==
As of 2010, three rural localities in Smolensk Oblast bear this name:

- Ivankovo, Kholm-Zhirkovsky District, Smolensk Oblast, a village in Agibalovskoye Rural Settlement of Kholm-Zhirkovsky District
- Ivankovo, Ugransky District, Smolensk Oblast, a village in Rusanovskoye Rural Settlement of Ugransky District
- Ivankovo, Vyazemsky District, Smolensk Oblast, a village in Zavodskoye Rural Settlement of Vyazemsky District

== Tambov Oblast ==
As of 2010, one rural locality in Tambov Oblast bears this name:

- Ivankovo, Tambov Oblast, a selo in Avdeyevsky Selsoviet of Tambovsky District

== Tver Oblast ==
As of 2010, eight rural localities in Tver Oblast bear this name:

- Ivankovo, Bezhetsky District, Tver Oblast, a village in Bezhetsky District
- Ivankovo, Kalyazinsky District, Tver Oblast, a village in Kalyazinsky District
- Ivankovo, Kuvshinovsky District, Tver Oblast, a village in Kuvshinovsky District
- Ivankovo, Selizharovsky District, Tver Oblast, a village in Selizharovsky District
- Ivankovo, Staritsky District, Tver Oblast, a village in Staritsky District
- Ivankovo, Torzhoksky District, Tver Oblast, a village in Torzhoksky District
- Ivankovo (Kholokholenskoye Rural Settlement), Vyshnevolotsky District, Tver Oblast, a village in Vyshnevolotsky District; municipally, a part of Kholokholenskoye Rural Settlement of that district
- Ivankovo (Kolomenskoye Rural Settlement), Vyshnevolotsky District, Tver Oblast, a village in Vyshnevolotsky District; municipally, a part of Kolomenskoye Rural Settlement of that district

== Vologda Oblast ==
As of 2010, two rural localities in Vologda Oblast bear this name:

- Ivankovo, Sheksninsky District, Vologda Oblast, a village in Nifantovsky Selsoviet of Sheksninsky District
- Ivankovo, Sokolsky District, Vologda Oblast, a village in Arkhangelsky Selsoviet of Sokolsky District

== Yaroslavl Oblast ==
As of 2010, two rural localities in Yaroslavl Oblast bear this name:

- Ivankovo, Uglichsky District, Yaroslavl Oblast, a selo in Zaozersky Rural Okrug of Uglichsky District
- Ivankovo, Yaroslavsky District, Yaroslavl Oblast, a village in Tochishchensky Rural Okrug of Yaroslavsky District

== See also ==
- Ivankovo (disambiguation)
