= 2025 Ivanovo Antonov An-22 crash =

2025 aviation accident in Russia

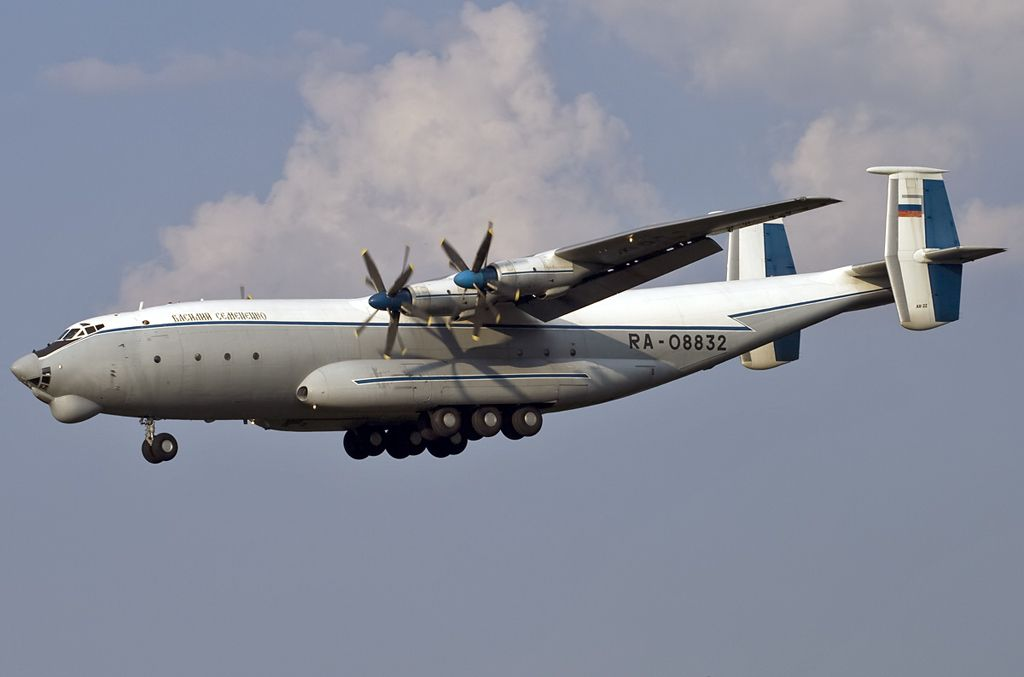
- The aircraft involved in the accident, seen in 2010 with a previous registration

Accident
- Date: December 9, 2025
- Summary: In-flight breakup, under investigation
- Site: Ivanovo, Russia; 57.166389°N 40.833889°E

Aircraft
- Aircraft type: Antonov An-22A
- Operator: Russian Air Force
- Registration: RF-08832
- Flight origin: Ivanovo Severny Air Base
- Destination: Ivanovo Severny Air Base
- Occupants: 7
- Passengers: 2
- Crew: 5
- Fatalities: 7
- Survivors: 0

On 9 December 2025, the last operational Antonov An-22 aircraft, operated by the Russian Air Force, crashed shortly after takeoff due to an in-flight breakup, killing all five crew members and two passengers. The aircraft was conducting a test flight prior to returning to service following heavy maintenance when the aircraft broke up midair and crashed into a lake (Uvod'skoye Vodokhranilishche) near Ivanovo, Russia at approximately 12:00 PM MSK.

== Background ==
=== Aircraft ===
The aircraft involved was a Antonov An-22A, registered as RF-08832, msn 053484317/07-04, manufactured in 1975, equipped with four Kuznetsov NK-12MA turboprop engines.

=== Crew ===
There were five crew members on board: Captain Sergey Shmakov, who was also a Major for the Russian Air Force, first officer Dmitry Yatsenko, flight officer Kirill Vakulenko, flight engineer Alexey Dorofeev, who was also a Senior Lieutenant for the Russian Air Force, and system engineer Igor Belyakov.

== Accident ==
CCTV footage showing the mid-air breakup of the An-22

The aircraft was performing a post-maintenance test flight and while the aircraft was on its initial climb, it broke up midair and crashed into a lake at approximately 12:00 PM Moscow Standard Time (MSK).

According to eyewitness testimonies and local CCTV footage capturing the sequence, the aircraft underwent a sudden mid-air disintegration starting at the aft fuselage section. The tail and rear structural components separated from the main body while climbing through the winter atmosphere. The unexpected breakup caused the aircraft to hardly bank to port on the lake. It crashed on an uninhabited reservoir, named the Uvodskoye Reservoir near Ivankovo village on the Furmanovsky District on Ivanovo Oblast, killing all 7 people on board.

== Aftermath ==
The aircraft was the final operating Antonov An-22. After the crash, the Antonov An-22 was reported to have been retired from active service.

== See also ==
- 1970 Atlantic Ocean Antonov An-22 crash
