= KSVH =

KSVH may refer to:

- KSVH-LP, a low-power television station (channel 23) licensed to Victoria, Texas, United States
- Statesville Regional Airport, in Statesville, North Carolina (ICAO code KSVH)
