= In-flight breakup =

Structural failure of an aircraft when in mid-air

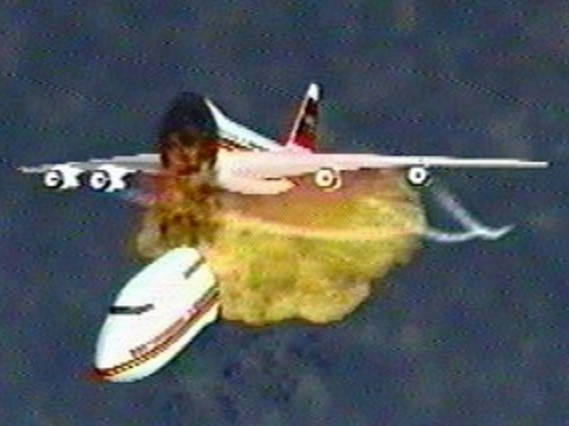
CIA's depiction of how TWA Flight 800 broke apart

An in-flight breakup or mid-air breakup is a catastrophic failure of an aircraft structure that causes it to break apart in mid-air.

== Causes ==
Faults in the design, manufacturing of the aircraft, or weather conditions (such as the cause of Aloha 243) can create weak points or stress concentrations in the structure, or constant use and repeated loading and unloading cycles on the aircraft can lead to fatigue cracking.

Also, pilot error or adverse weather conditions can cause the aircraft to experience more extreme conditions than those it was designed to tolerate.

Additionally, a bomb for terrorism or insurance fraud can cause the aircraft to breakup.

== Crashes involving in-flight breakups ==
=== 1930s ===
- Meopham Air Disaster (1930)
- TWA Flight 599 (March 31, 1931)
- Imperial Airways City of Liverpool (1933)
- United Air Lines Trip 23 (1933)
- Swissair Curtiss T-32 Condor II Crash (1934)
- USS Macon (1935) [note, this was a airship, not a fixed wing aircraft]

=== 1940s ===
- Birkenhead B-24 Liberator Breakup (Not much information avalable) (1944)
- Northrop YB-49 Flying Wing Breakup (Not much information avalable) (1948)
- Northwest Airlines Flight 421 (1948)
- Eastern Air Lines Flight 537 (1949)

=== 1950s ===
- BOAC Flight 781 (1954)
- South African Airways Flight 201 (1954)

=== 1960s ===
- Pan Am Flight 214 (1963)
- Eastern Provincial Airways Flight 102 (1965)
- BOAC Flight 911 (1966)
- Braniff International Airways Flight 250 (1966)
- Piedmont Airlines Flight 22 (1967)
- Wien Consolidated Airlines Flight 55 (1968)

=== 1970s ===
- Hughes Airwest Flight 706 (1971)
- JAT Flight 367 (1972)
- Cathay Pacific Flight 700Z (1972)
- Tan Son Nhut Lockheed C-5 crash (1975)
- British Airways Flight 476 (1976)

=== 1980s ===
- Itavia Flight 870 (1980)
- Pacific Southwest Airlines Flight 182 (1982) (note, THE CESSNA broke up, not the 727)
- Korean Air Lines Flight 007 (1983)
- Air India Flight 182 (1985)
- South African Airways Flight 295 (1987)
- Iran Air Flight 655 (1988)
- Pan Am Flight 103 (1988)
- Partn Air Flight 394 (1989)
- UTA Flight 772 (1989)

=== 1990s ===
- Lauda Air Flight 004 (1991)
- Continental Express Flight 2574 (1991)
- Trans-Air Services Flight 671 (1992)
- Copa Airlines Flight 201 (1992)
- China Northwest Airlines Flight 2303 (1994)
- TWA Flight 800 (1996)
- Charkhi Dadri mid-air collision: Saudia Flight 763 and Kazakhstan Airlines Flight 1907 (1996)
- Silk Air Flight 185 (1997)
- EgyptAir Flight 990 (1999)

=== 2000s ===
- China Airlines Flight 611 (2002)
- United States airtanker crashes (2002)
- Überlingen mid-air collision: Bashkirian Airlines Flight 2937 and DHL Flight 611
- STS-107 (2003)
- Gol Flight 1907 (2006)
- Adam Air Flight 574 (2007)

=== 2010s ===
- Malaysia Airlines Flight 17 (2014)
- VSS Enterprise (2014)
- Metrojet Flight 9268 (2015)
- United States Marine Corps KC-130 crash 2017

=== 2020s ===
- Turkish Air Force Flight 543 (2025)
- Ivanovo Antonov An-22 crash (2025)

== Partial-Breakups ==
A Partial--breakup (or semi breakup) is a variant of the standard mid-air breakup, the only difference is that the plane does not breakup as a whole, most of the plane is still intact.

=== 1950s ===
- [placeholder]

=== 1960s ===
- Wien Consolidated Airlines Flight 55 (1968)

=== 1970s ===
- [placeholder]

=== 1980s ===
- NLM CityHopper Flight 431 (1981)
- Japan Airlines Flight 123 (1985)
- Aloha Airlines Flight 243 (1988)

=== 1990s ===
- [placeholder]

=== 2000s ===
- American Airlines Flight 587 (2001)
- Chalk's Ocean Airways Flight 101 (2005)

=== 2010s ===
- [placeholder]

=== 2020s ===
- 2026 Palm Beach County Learjet 60 crash (2026)

== See also ==
- American Airlines Flight 587
- American Airlines Flight 191
- Aloha Airlines Flight 243
- Japan Airlines Flight 123
- Aviation accidents and incidents
- Boeing 747
- Suicide attack
- Terrorism
- Aircraft hijacking
- Stall
- Aviation safety
- Controlled flight into terrain
- List of DC-10 accidents and incidents
