= Bering Air Flight 445 =

2025 aviation accident in Alaska

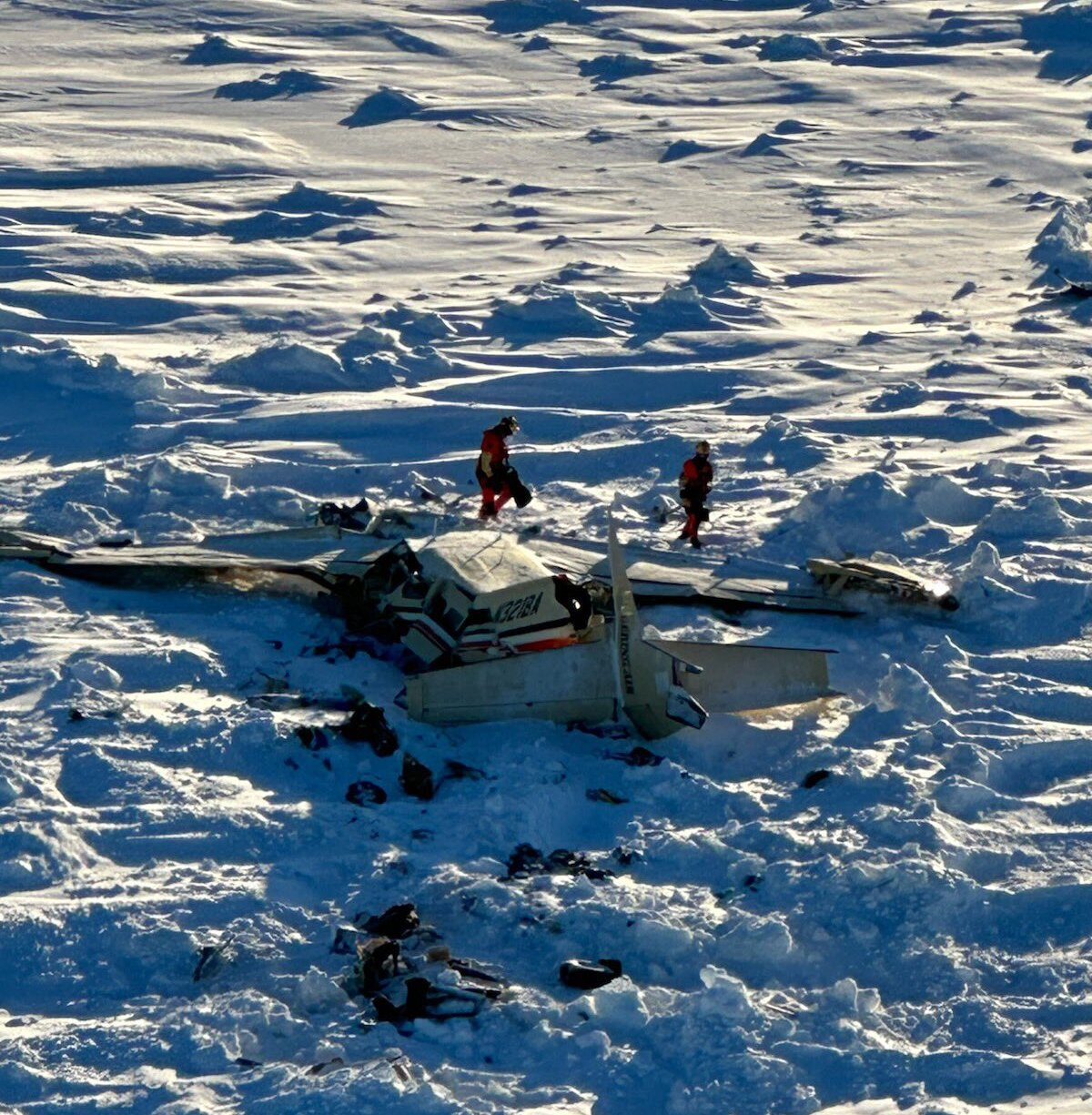
- United States Coast Guard members investigating the wreckage of the aircraft

Accident
- Date: February 6, 2025
- Summary: Loss of control due to in-flight icing, pilot error; loss of situational awareness, and lack of FAA oversight
- Site: Over the Norton Sound, Bering Sea; 64°21′0″N 164°16′0″W

Aircraft
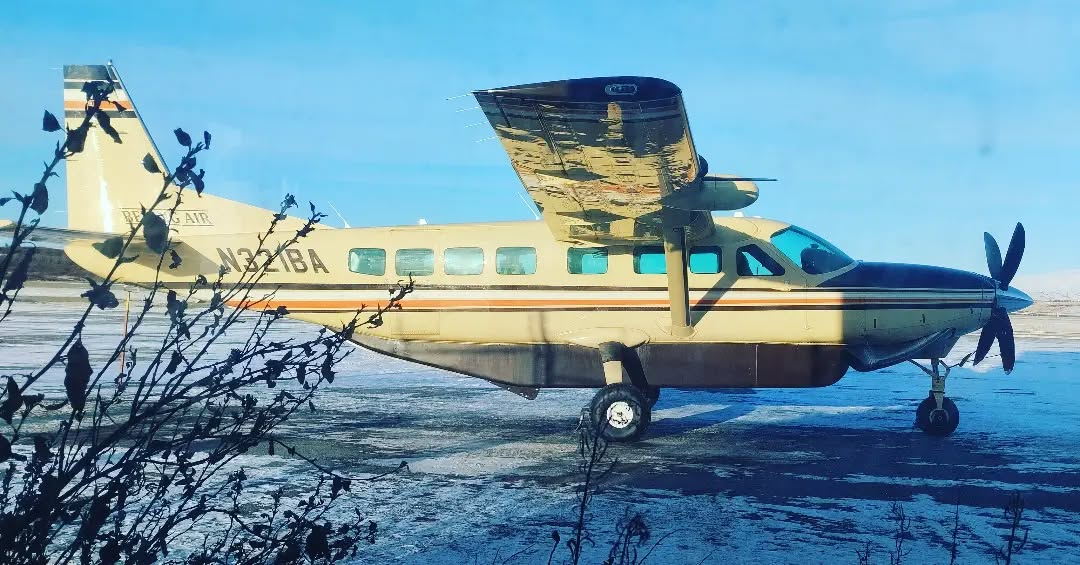
- N321BA, the aircraft involved in the accident, seen in 2022
- Aircraft type: Cessna 208B Grand Caravan EX
- Operator: Bering Air
- IATA flight No.: 8E445
- ICAO flight No.: BRG445
- Call sign: BERING AIR 445
- Registration: N321BA
- Flight origin: Unalakleet Airport, Alaska, United States
- Destination: Nome Airport, Alaska, United States
- Occupants: 10
- Passengers: 9
- Crew: 1
- Fatalities: 10
- Survivors: 0

Bering Air Flight 445 was a scheduled American domestic flight from Unalakleet Airport to Nome Airport in Alaska operated by Bering Air, a commuter airline based in Nome. On February 6, 2025, the Cessna 208B Grand Caravan operating the flight crashed into the then-frozen surface of Norton Sound; after the plane was reported missing, the wreckage was located the next day and all 10 occupants were found to have been killed.

== Background ==
=== Aircraft ===
The aircraft was a Cessna 208B Grand Caravan EX operated by Bering Air, registered as N321BA with serial number 208B5613. The aircraft was manufactured in 2020.

=== Passengers and crew ===
Nine passengers and one pilot, all adults with ages ranging from 30 to 58 years were on board the aircraft. On February 7, 2025, the Coast Guard announced that all 10 people had died in the crash.

Two passengers were identified as utility operation employees under the division of Environmental Health and Engineering team of the Alaska Native Tribal Health Consortium. They were reportedly on a work trip to Unalakleet to assist with a heating system for a water plant.

Another passenger, mechanic "Diesel" Don Erickson, is featured posthumously in season 19 episode 9 of the Discovery Channel show Bering Sea Gold, as he troubleshoots engine problems on the Reaper Nation gold crawler vessel. The episode was first broadcast in October 2025 with a memorial dedication to Erickson as well as the other crash victims.

== Accident ==
The scheduled domestic flight, operating as Flight 445, departed from Unalakleet Airport and took off from Runway 33 at 2:38 p.m. AKST. It was expected to arrive at Nome Airport at 4:20 p.m. According to Flightradar24, the last position transmitted by the aircraft was 64°19.81′N 164°01.61′W at 3:16 p.m., with an altitude of 5,300 feet (1,615 m).

The aircraft climbed to a cruising altitude of about 7,700 feet (2,347 m). Prior to the disappearance on radar, the flight's pilot informed Anchorage Air Route Traffic Control Center that he would begin a holding pattern with the plane while waiting for the runway to be cleared of snow.

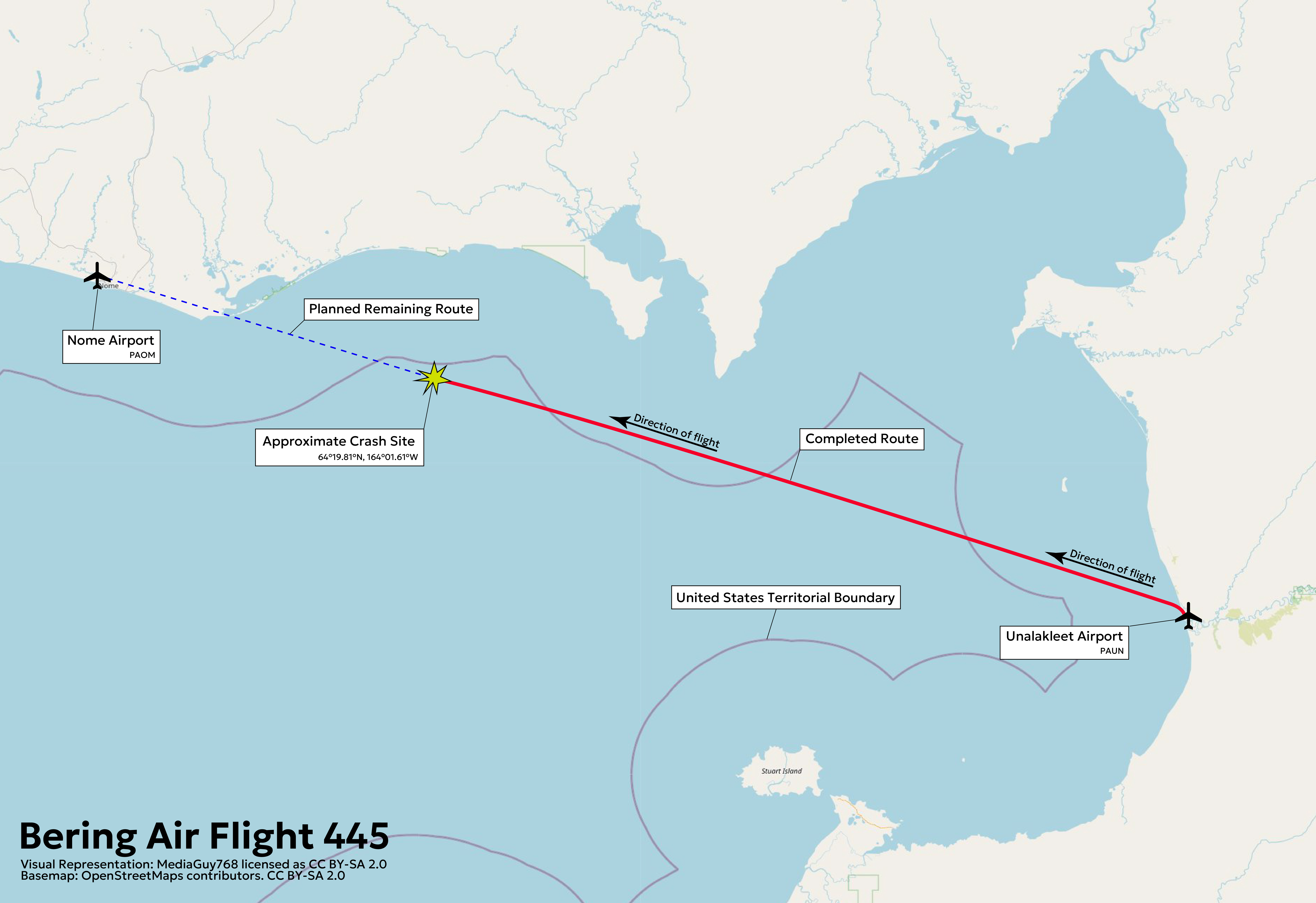
The flight path of Flight 445, derived from data from public ADS-B data.

Coast Guard Lieutenant Commander Benjamin McIntyre-Coble said that no distress signals were received from the plane. US Civil Air Patrol stated that around 3:18 p.m., the aircraft had undergone "some kind of event which caused them to experience a rapid loss in elevation and a rapid loss in speed". The Coast Guard said the plane went missing about 30 mi (48 km) southeast of Nome.

The aircraft was found to have crashed onto an ice floe in Norton Sound approximately 34 mi (55 km) southeast of its destination at Nome.

== Response ==
The Nome Volunteer Fire Department conducted ground searches from Nome and White Mountain, but were limited in their ability to conduct air searches due to poor weather. The United States Coast Guard and Air Force assisted with rescue efforts, flying over the area in order to locate the aircraft. A C-130 Hercules was also dispatched by the Coast Guard from Elmendorf Air Force Base in Anchorage to search over Norton Sound. Several Bering Air planes also flew over the area. Alaska State Troopers also participated in the search.

Norton Sound Health Corporation, a local hospital in Nome, issued a statement saying it was "standing ready to respond to a community medical emergency."

The US Coast Guard of Alaska announced the end of the search on Twitter, upon discovering the plane's remains. It said that nobody survived the crash. Recovery of the bodies of the victims was completed by February 9. Retrieval operations were affected by warnings of an upcoming winter storm and the fact that the ice floe in which the aircraft crashed was moving at a rate of about 5 miles (8 kilometers) a day.

== Reactions ==
Alaskan Senator Lisa Murkowski expressed her prayers and condolences towards the families and friends of the passengers, those in Bering Air, and the community of Nome, in a post on Twitter. The Governor of Alaska Mike Dunleavy and Alaskan Junior Senator Dan Sullivan similarly expressed their condolences on Twitter.

Members of both the Nome and Unalakleet communities expressed grief over the accident. Unalakleet's City Administrator, Kelsi Ivanoff, stated that the city is "No stranger to losing community members to plane wrecks", and as a result, the outcome of the incident, "Hits really close to home for our community.” Prayer vigils were held in Nome for the victims and search personnel on February 7.

Following the announcement of the plane crash on February 7, CEO Natasha Singh and Vice President David Beveridge of the Alaska Native Tribal Health Consortium made statements during a press conference to honor their workers who were identified as victims of the flight. Bering Air set up a dedicated phone line to assist relatives of the crash victims.

== Investigation ==
The National Transportation Safety Board (NTSB) announced that they would launch an investigation into the cause of the fatal crash. Clint Johnson, chief of the NTSB Alaska region, stated saying "We are very much in the preliminary stages of this investigation" at a news briefing, and that the agency was well-aware of the crash and have been monitoring developments. NTSB Chair Jennifer Homendy travelled to Alaska in the weekend following the crash and spoke with reporters at a press briefing in Anchorage.

A preliminary report released by the NTSB on March 19, 2025, revealed that the plane took off with a weight of 9,865 pounds (4,474 kg), which was 1,058 pounds (480 kg) over limit in icing conditions and more than 800 pounds (363 kg) over limit in regular conditions. The report also revealed that icing was discovered on the tail of the airplane.

The final report was released by NTSB on July 30, 2026 attributed the cause to poor pilot control and the plane being over 1000 lbs its rated maximum takeoff capacity for icing conditions. It also attributed the safety culture of Bering Air, which allowed for overloaded flights.

== See also ==
- 2025 in aviation
