= Ivankovo =

Ivankovo may refer to:

- Ivankovo, Croatia, a municipality in Vukovar-Syrmia County of Slavonia, Croatia
- Ivankovo, Russia, name of several rural localities in Russia
- Ivankovo Reservoir, a reservoir on the Volga River, Russia
