= 2025 Turkish Air Force Lockheed C-130 crash =

2025 aircraft accident in Georgia (country)

Coordinates: 41°25′00″N 45°45′06″E

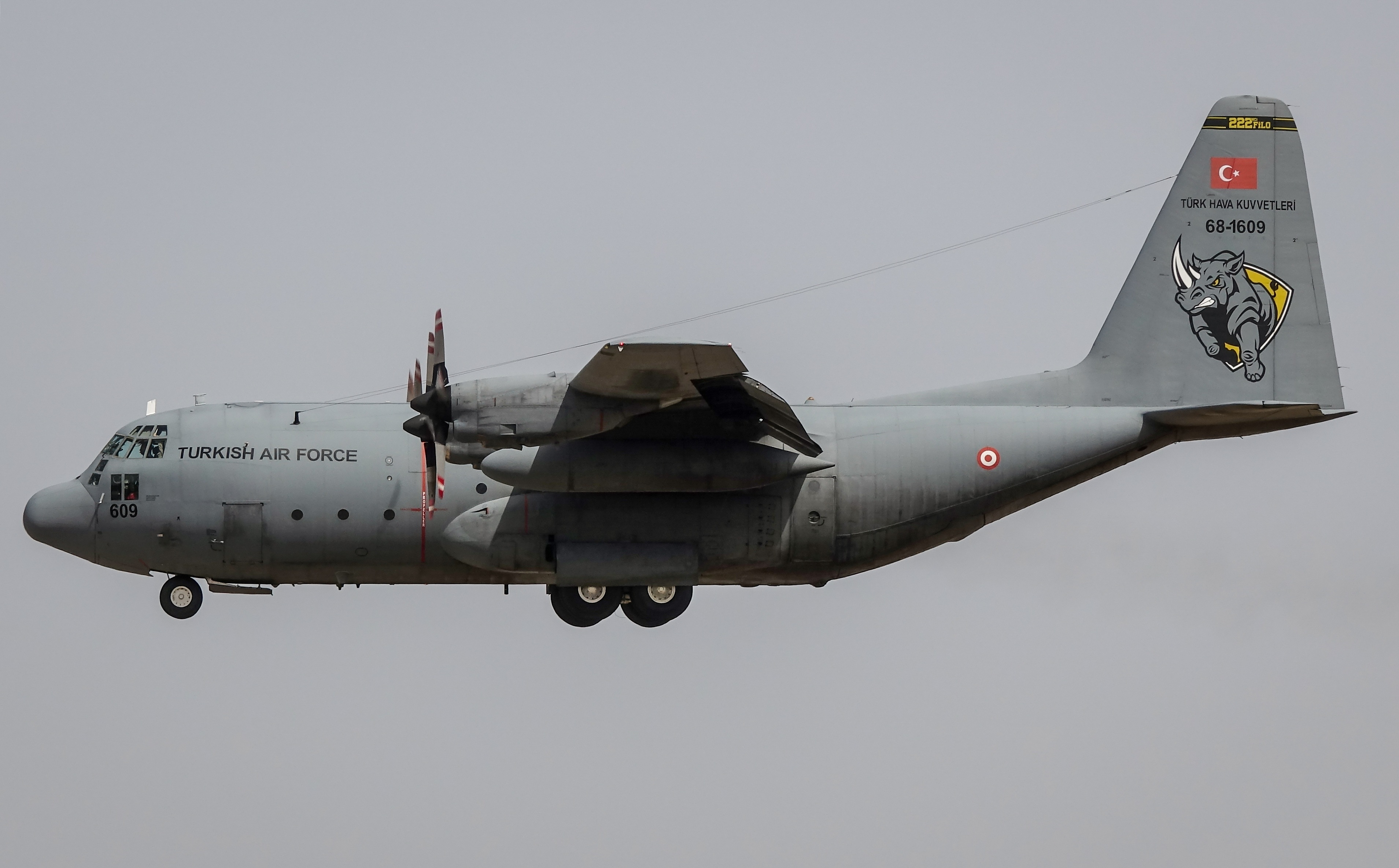
- 68-1609, the aircraft involved in the accident, pictured in 2023

Accident
- Date: November 11, 2025
- Summary: Crashed after an in-flight breakup; under investigation
- Site: Near Rustavi, Sighnaghi Municipality, Kakheti, Georgia

Aircraft
- Aircraft type: Lockheed C-130EM Hercules
- Operator: Turkish Air Force
- Call sign: TUAF 543
- Registration: 68-1609
- Flight origin: Ganja International Airport, Ganja, Azerbaijan
- Destination: Merzifon Air Base, Merzifon, Turkey
- Occupants: 20
- Fatalities: 20
- Survivors: 0

On 11 November 2025, a Turkish Air Force Lockheed C-130 Hercules flying from Ganja International Airport, Ganja, Azerbaijan, to Merzifon Air Base, Merzifon, Turkey, experienced an in-flight breakup, splitting into 3 pieces, and crashed in Georgia, near the Azerbaijan–Georgia border, killing all 20 occupants on board.

== Background ==
=== Aircraft ===
The aircraft involved was a 57-year-old Lockheed C-130EM Hercules with serial number 68–1609. Built in 1968, it was originally delivered to the Royal Saudi Air Force. It entered service with the Turkish Air Force in March 2010 and was in regular service prior to the accident. The plane belonged to the 12th Air Base Command in Kayseri. The C-130B/E Hercules is widely used by Turkey for military and humanitarian transport.

=== Passengers and crew ===
The aircraft carried at least 20 occupants, including an unspecified number of crew members. Local media reported that both Turkish and Azerbaijani military personnel were aboard. The Turkish Ministry of Defense said that 20 of its soldiers were on board, without mentioning occupants of other nationalities.

== Accident ==
The aircraft was a Lockheed C-130EM Hercules (registration 68-1609, callsign TUAF543), a 57-year-old airframe originally built in 1968 for the Royal Saudi Air Force. Turkey purchased it in 2012, inducted it into service in 2014, and modernized it again in 2022 under the ERCIYES upgrade programme, which fitted new avionics and cockpit displays. It was assigned to the 12th Air Transport Base Command in Kayseri and had passed a maintenance inspection one month prior to the crash.

On 11 November 2025, the aircraft flew from Kayseri to Ganja International Airport in Azerbaijan, arriving at 08:04 UTC, approximately two hours later a X5.1 solar flare took place at 10:04 UTC, the aircraft departed Ganja at 10:19 UTC carrying 10 Turkish Air Force F-16 maintenance specialists and a 10-person flight crew — personnel who had been servicing Turkish F-16s that participated in Azerbaijan's Victory Day parade in Baku on 8 November. The aircraft was bound for Merzifon Air Base in Turkey and was not carrying ammunition.

The aircraft reached a maximum altitude of 7,315 m (24,000 ft) at 10:41 UTC after crossing into Georgian airspace. At 10:49:20 UTC — 27 minutes after entering Georgia — its ADS-B transponder signal was lost with no distress call and no emergency squawk. The final recorded true airspeed was 302 knots; vertical speed data at the moment of signal loss exceeded 19,000 feet per minute downward, consistent with immediate structural failure rather than a controlled descent.

Video footage showed the aircraft had broken into three distinct sections in mid-air: the centre fuselage with all four engines and wings attached spiralling downward while venting fuel, the forward fuselage and cockpit section falling separately, and the tail (empennage) detached and falling separately. The wreckage came down near the village of Rustavi in Sighnaghi Municipality, Kakheti region, approximately 5 km from the Georgian–Azerbaijani border, and was scattered across farmland surrounded by hills. All 20 people on board were killed.

Georgian authorities reached the crash site by approximately 17:00 local time. A 46-member Turkish accident investigation team deployed to the site, and Turkey sent an unmanned aerial vehicle to assist the search. The remains of 18 victims were recovered by 12 November; both flight recorders were retrieved and transported to Ankara for analysis by Turkish Aerospace Industries (TUSAŞ). The Turkish Ministry of National Defence released the names of all 20 victims on 12 November. On 13 November, Turkey grounded all 18 remaining C-130s in its fleet pending technical inspections.

A state funeral was held on 14 November at Mürted Air Base Command in Ankara, attended by families, officials, and fellow soldiers; remains were subsequently transferred to the victims' hometowns for burial. All crash wreckage was transported back to Turkey by truck on 19 November.

Defence Minister Yaşar Güler stated on 17 November that preliminary findings indicated the tail had separated first before the aircraft broke into three parts, though he cautioned the finding was not definitive pending full black box analysis, which he said would take "at least two months". Analysis was conducted by TUSAŞ alongside the Scientific and Technological Research Council of Turkey (TÜBİTAK) and the Mechanical and Chemical Industry Corporation.

In early 2026, Doğu Perinçek, leader of the Patriotic Party, publicly alleged that Israel had shot down the aircraft. The Ministry of National Defence publicly rejected the claim as "disinformation" and announced legal action against those making such assertions. On 3 April 2026, a forensic report by the Gendarmerie Criminal Laboratory, prepared for the Ankara Chief Public Prosecutor's Office, found no traces of a munition blast, no evidence of a direct ammunition strike, no improvised explosive device, and no suspicious chemical substances or fire accelerants in the wreckage, ruling out external attack and sabotage. The structural cause of the breakup remained under active investigation.

== Investigation ==
An investigation was started for "violation of flight safety regulations or rules for the operation of an air vehicle resulting in human casualties" in Azerbaijan. The Ministry of Internal Affairs will provide detailed information about the incident to the public in stages. A 46-member Turkish accident investigation team reached the site and began inspecting the wreckage. Turkish president Recep Tayyip Erdoğan confirmed investigators have found the flight recorder. The wreckage was transferred to Turkey for further investigation.

Lockheed Martin, the US-based manufacturer of the C-130, said it would assist in the investigation. On 13 November, the Turkish defence ministry announced the grounding of all C-130s of the Turkish Armed Forces for technical inspections.

== Aftermath ==
Immediately after the crash, a coordinated search and rescue effort was launched by Georgian and Azerbaijani authorities. Georgian authorities arrived at the scene of the crash at approximately 5 p.m., and the Turkish military sent an unmanned aerial vehicle in support of the rescue efforts.

Azerbaijan's President Ilham Aliyev expressed his condolences for the victims involved. Tom Barrack, the US ambassador to Turkey, expressed his support to the families of the victims and said that his country "stands in solidarity with our Turkish allies". NATO Secretary General Mark Rutte conveyed his sympathies, honored the military personnel who died and thanked all NATO personnel for their service.

A funeral ceremony for the victims was held at an airbase in Ankara on 14 November, after which their remains were transferred to their respective hometowns.

== See also ==
- List of accidents and incidents involving the Lockheed C-130 Hercules
- 2017 United States Marine Corps KC-130 crash; another Lockheed C-130 Hercules that had an in-flight breakup
- 2025 in aviation
