= 1970 Atlantic Ocean Antonov An-22 crash =

Fatal aviation accident

Atlantic Ocean Antonov An-22 crash
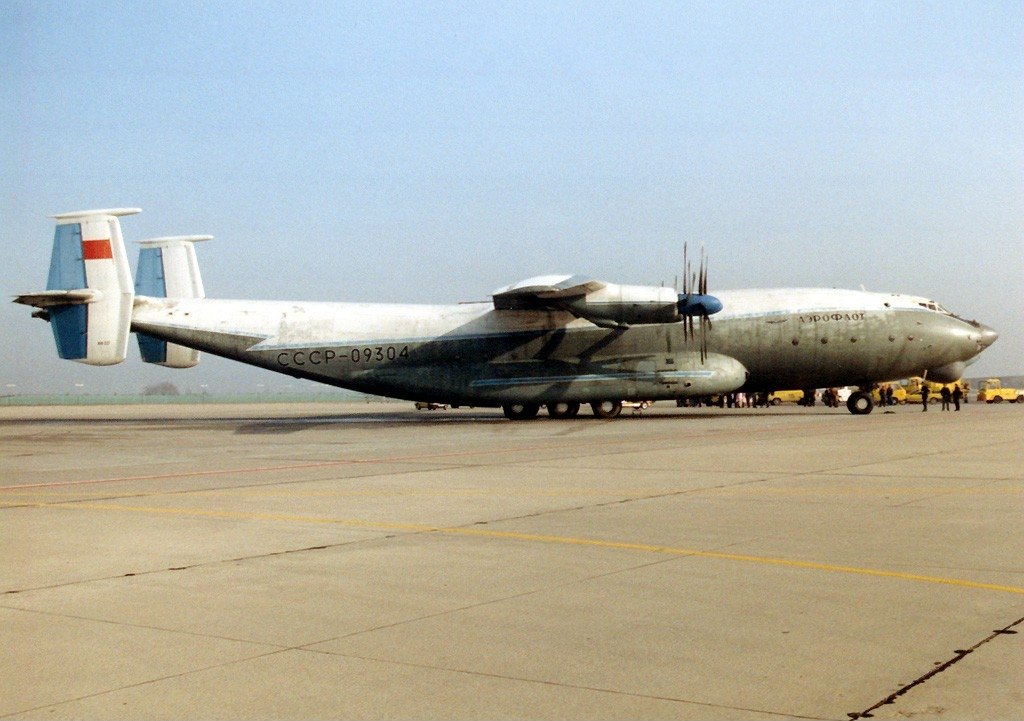
- Sister aircraft of the crashed CCCP-09303

Accident
- Date: 18 July 1970
- Summary: Unknown; possible propeller separation leading to explosive decompression
- Site: Atlantic Ocean, South-East of Greenland

Aircraft
- Aircraft type: Antonov An-22
- Operator: Soviet Air Forces
- Registration: CCCP-09303
- Flight origin: Ivanovo Severny Air Base, Ivanovo, Soviet Union
- 1st stopover: Chkalovsky Airport; Shchyolkovo, Soviet Union
- 2nd stopover: Keflavík International Airport; Reykjavík, Iceland
- Last stopover: Halifax Stanfield International Airport; Halifax, Canada
- Destination: Jorge Chávez International Airport, Lima, Peru
- Passengers: 7
- Crew: 15
- Fatalities: 22
- Survivors: 0

On July 18 1970, an Antonov An-22 of Soviet Air Forces crashed in the Atlantic Ocean between Iceland and Greenland, while on its way to Halifax, Canada. It was the first crash of the Antonov An-22 model and it resulted in the deaths of all 22 people on board.

== Aircraft ==
The aircraft involved in the accident was an Antonov An-22 heavy-lift freighter built in the Tashkent Mechanical Plant between late 1969 and early 1970 with the construction number 00340207 and serial number 02-07. The aircraft was built for the Soviet Air Forces, where it was assigned the registration CCCP-09303, (Note: Antonov An-22s were operated by the Soviet Air Force in the colours of the Soviet Union's airline Aeroflot with civilian registrations.) and was stationed at Ivanovo Severny Air Base near Ivanovo.

== Background and flight ==
Following the 1970 Ancash earthquake, which killed tens of thousands of people and destroyed many cities in Peru, the 81st Military Transport Aviation Regiment of the Soviet Air Forces participated in the transport of humanitarian aid to that country. The unit operated heavy-lift aircraft, among them the Antonov An-22. Due to the limited range and heavy cargo of food and seven passengers, the flight plan called for the aircraft to make several stops while on its way to Peru. Since the flight was longer than 17,000 kilometres (10,600 mi; 9,200 nmi), two crews were used for the flight. This also served as a training opportunity for the pilots.

== Crash ==
On 18 July the aircraft took off from Keflavik airport in Iceland on its way to Halifax. Forty-seven minutes after the aircraft took off, at 14:30 all contact with it was lost and it disappeared from radar screens. As the crew did not respond to communication from the air traffic controllers and no airport recorded the aircraft landing, it was presumed that the aircraft had crashed in the ocean. Soon after a search and rescue operation began together with NATO aircraft and a Soviet Antonov An-12. During the search pieces of the aircraft were found, confirming that it had indeed crashed. No survivors were found.

== Investigation ==
Following the inspection of recovered pieces of the aircraft, an in-flight fire was ruled out. The Soviet Ministry of Aviation Production made a hypothesis that an uncontrolled decompression had occurred, the cause of which has never been fully established.

Five months after the crash of CCCP-09303, a sister aircraft crashed in India, killing all 17 on board. The cause of that crash was the separation of one of the propeller blades, which struck the fuselage of the aircraft and caused an explosive decompression. It is believed that this was most likely also the cause of the crash of CCCP-09303 in the Atlantic.

== Aftermath ==
Following the disaster, all pressurized An-22s were grounded. Memorials to the flight crew of CCCP-09303 were built in Moscow and Lima.
