= 2025 North Carolina Cessna Citation II crash =

2025 aviation accident in North Carolina

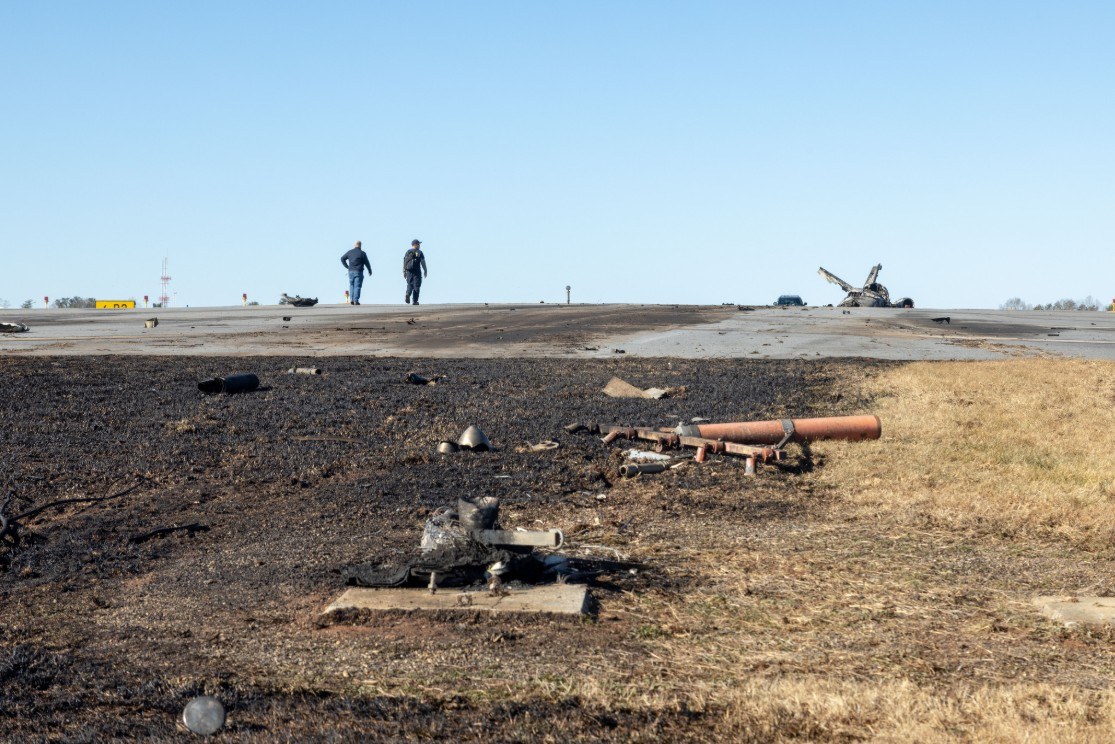
- A partial view of the debris field

Accident
- Date: December 18, 2025
- Summary: Crashed during failed emergency landing attempt, under investigation
- Site: Statesville Regional Airport, Statesville, North Carolina, U.S.; 35°45′49″N 80°56′20″W

Aircraft
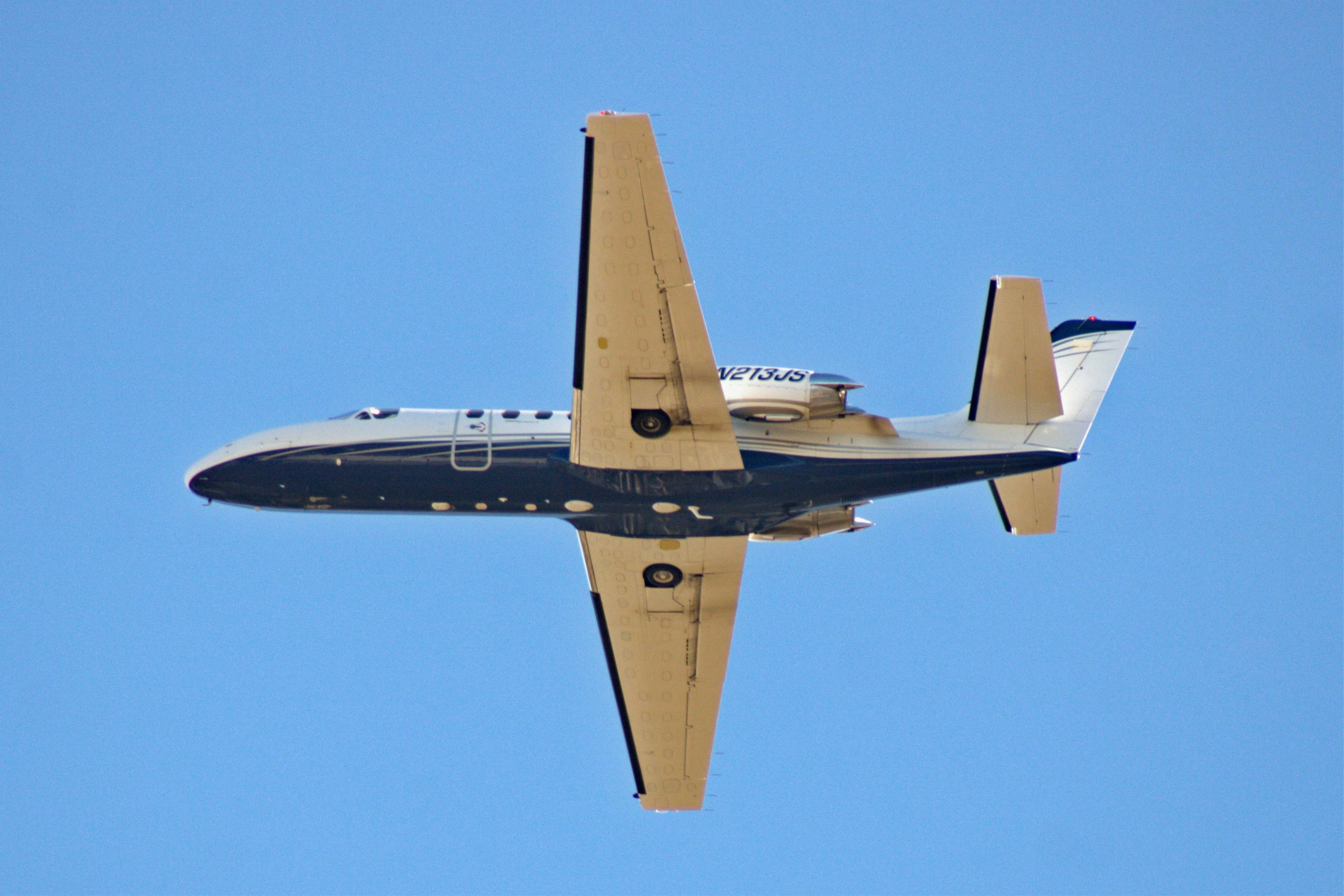
- A Cessna 550, similar to the one involved in the accident
- Aircraft type: Cessna 550
- Operator: GB Aviation Leasing LLC
- Call sign: TWO FIVE SEVEN BRAVO WHISKEY
- Registration: N257BW
- Flight origin: Statesville Regional Airport, Statesville, North Carolina, U.S.
- Destination: Sarasota–Bradenton International Airport Sarasota, Florida, U.S.
- Occupants: 7
- Passengers: 5
- Crew: 2
- Fatalities: 7
- Survivors: 0

On December 18, 2025, a Cessna 550 Citation II business jet crashed in Statesville, North Carolina. The crash occurred between 10:15 and 10:20 a.m. local time. Seven people were killed in the crash, including former NASCAR driver Greg Biffle, his wife and his two children.

== Background ==
Statesville is about 45 miles (72 km) north of Charlotte. Statesville Airport is a small regional airport without a control tower.

Shortly after the crash, low clouds and light rain were reported in the area. The area had a visibility of less than three miles.

The plane, a Cessna C550 business jet, was owned by GB Aviation Leasing LLC, which was owned by retired NASCAR driver Greg Biffle. The plane had the tail number N257BW and was manufactured in 1981. Flight records show that the plane was scheduled to fly to Florida and spend most of the rest of the day there. The plane had seven occupants.

== Crash ==
The plane departed from Statesville Airport from runway 10 at 10:06 a.m. and traveled around 11 miles (18 km) before turning sharply to the left back towards the airport. The plane reached a maximum altitude of 4,300 feet (1,300 m). Upon returning to the airport, the plane crashed at the east side of the runway while attempting to land.

== Victims ==
All seven occupants were killed in the crash. The victims were identified as Biffle, his daughter Emma, his wife Cristina, their son Ryder, Craig Wadsworth, pilot Dennis Dutton and his son Jack Dutton.

Only Dennis Dutton, a former Delta Air Lines pilot, possessed a valid type rating to fly the aircraft, which was required to be flown by two type-rated pilots. Greg Biffle and Jack Dutton were licensed pilots but neither was type-rated to act as first officer (FO) in the 550. Early reports did not identify who was acting as FO, leading to speculation that Biffle may have been doing so in violation of regulations, but in January 2026 the National Transportation Safety Board (NTSB) identified him as a non-flying passenger. The NTSB said Dennis Dutton was captain while Jack was sitting in the FO's seat.

== Aftermath ==
The wreckage caught fire after the crash. Following the crash, Statesville Airport was closed due to debris from the crash on the runway. Biffle’s home was reportedly robbed several weeks afterwards.

== Investigation ==
The cockpit voice recorder (CVR), ground proximity warning system, a Garmin GTN 750 display and various cockpit instruments were recovered by an NTSB team. The NTSB began an investigation into the incident. Two briefings were held by the NTSB. A preliminary report has been released, but the final report will be expected to take 12 to 24 months.

The preliminary report was released on January 30, 2026. Cockpit voice recordings and ground witnesses revealed that the left engine did not start on the first attempt, and the captain and right-seat pilot-passenger discussed a malfunctioning thrust reverser indicator, but the reversers themselves appeared functional. The captain acted as pilot flying while the pilot-passenger acted as pilot monitoring, handling radio calls and checklists.

As the aircraft was not equipped with a flight data recorder (FDR), the preliminary report analyzes the accident sequence using data recorded by the Garmin GTN 750 and conversations recorded on the CVR. After the plane began to descend, a pilot-passenger said that there were temperature reading discrepancies between the engines, but the issue was not discussed further. The captain reported problems with the Garmin's altimeter, which then stopped recording altitude data, and stopped recording heading data a short time later. The right-seat pilot-passenger took the controls momentarily before the captain resumed control, turned back towards the airport, and called for flap and landing gear extension, but the flap and landing gear lights were not illuminated. A passenger asked if the alternator (which generates electrical power) was functioning properly, and although the Cessna 550 is not equipped with an alternator (it has a generator), the captain responded that it was the "problem" and the Garmin resumed functioning immediately afterwards. The plane continued to descend and lose airspeed as it turned to runway heading, and then struck a 29 ft (8.8 m) approach light structure about 1,380 ft (420 m) from the runway. The plane struck additional light structures and trees before coming to rest 400 ft (120 m) from the end of the runway in the runway overrun area. The fuselage was largely consumed by fire. The NTSB said there was no evidence of structural failure, fan blade damage to the engines was consistent with rotation on impact, and the engines remained attached to the airframe.
