= Aerolínea Lanhsa Flight 018 =

2025 aviation accident in Honduras

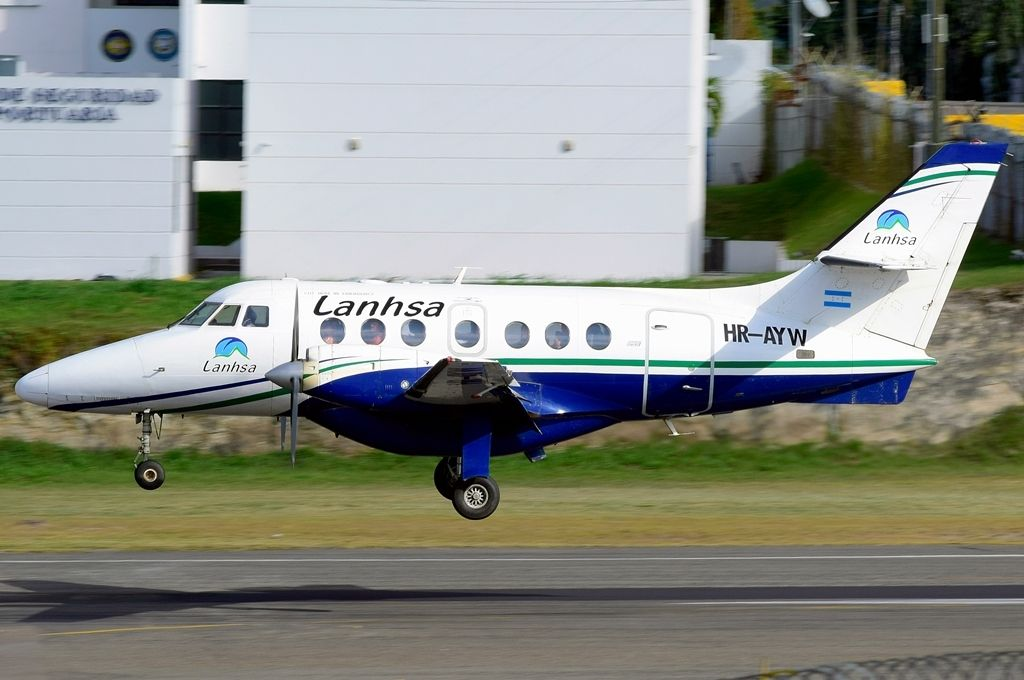
- HR-AYW, the aircraft involved in the accident, seen in 2024

Accident
- Date: 17 March 2025
- Summary: Crashed shortly after takeoff; under investigation
- Site: near Juan Manuel Gálvez International Airport, Roatán, Honduras; 16°18′59.8″N 86°31′11.1″W

Aircraft
- Aircraft type: British Aerospace Jetstream 32
- Operator: Aerolínea Lanhsa
- ICAO flight No.: LNH018
- Registration: HR-AYW
- Flight origin: Juan Manuel Gálvez International Airport, Roatán, Honduras
- Destination: Golosón International Airport, La Ceiba, Honduras
- Occupants: 17
- Passengers: 15
- Crew: 2
- Fatalities: 12
- Injuries: 5
- Survivors: 5

Aerolínea Lanhsa Flight 018 was a charter flight on 17 March 2025, from Juan Manuel Gálvez International Airport, on Roatán Island, department of Islas de la Bahía, to Golosón International Airport in La Ceiba, department of Atlántida. The aircraft, a British Aerospace Jetstream 31, crashed into the sea at 18:18 local time after experiencing engine failure shortly after takeoff, killing 12 of the 17 passengers and crew, including Honduran singer and politician Aurelio Martínez. The wreckage was found one kilometer (0.62 miles) off the coast according to the authorities.

== Background ==
=== Aircraft ===
The aircraft involved was a 35-year old British Aerospace Jetstream 32 manufactured in 1989 powered by twin Honeywell TPE331 turboprop engines registered as HR-AYW and operated by Honduran airline Aerolínea Lanhsa.

=== Passengers and crew ===
There were 17 people on board, two crew and 15 passengers. A French woman and an American were among the passengers. All of the victims were Hondurans. The flight crew consisted of 52-year-old captain Luis Ángel Araya and first officer Francisco Lagos, 29. Musician and former congressman Aurelio Martínez, one of the victims, was on board the aircraft. Of the five rescued people, all were sent to a hospital, including a man with a fractured shinbone and minor head trauma.

== Accident ==
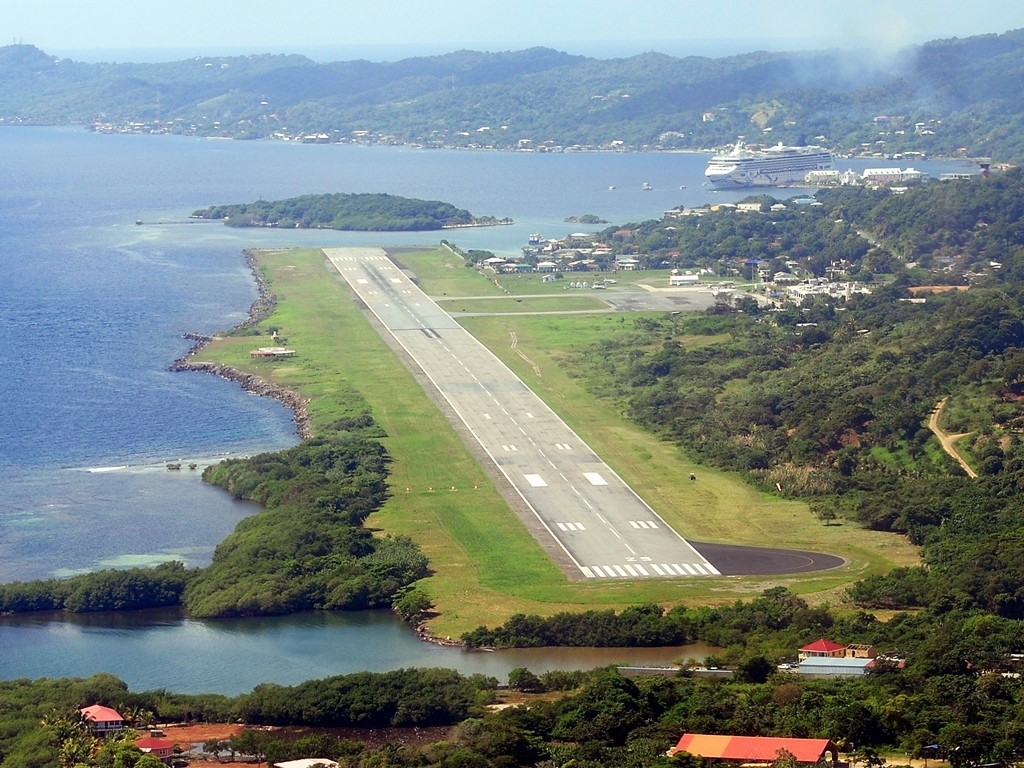
The runway at Juan Manuel Gálvez International Airport in 2013

The aircraft took off from runway 07 at Juan Manuel Gálvez International Airport for its flight to Golosón International Airport. The aircraft experienced a suspected mechanical failure one minute after takeoff, reaching a maximum altitude of 20–35 feet, then made a right turn and impacted water about one kilometer from the coastline. Local authorities reported that one of the plane's engines lost power before impacting the sea. The aircraft was submerged about 50 metres (160 ft) in an area with rocky seabed, making it difficult for rescuers to reach. The last passenger's body, a woman travelling with her husband was recovered the day after the accident. Her husband survived and was taken to a hospital.

== Reactions ==
The Government of Honduras said in a statement that it "deeply regrets the tragic accident in Roatán and joins in the national mourning". President Xiomara Castro activated an emergency committee after the accident. The bodies of the victims were taken to a morgue in San Pedro Sula.

== Investigation ==
The Honduran Civil Aeronautics Agency launched an investigation into the accident. A preliminary report was released on 25 April 2025, which detailed some of the accident sequence. An interim report was released on 18 March 2026, which stated that the Cockpit Voice Recorder (CVR) had not yet been recovered.

== Aftermath ==
Due to the crash of Flight 018, Aerolínea Lanhsa ceased all operations in April 2025.
