= Ivankovo, Sokolsky District, Vologda Oblast =

Ivankovo Иванково
- Village
- Location within Vologda Oblast Location within Russia
- Coordinates: 59°34′N 39°55′E
- Country: Russia
- Region: Vologda Oblast
- District: Sokolsky District
- Time zone: UTC+3:00

Ivankovo (Russian: Иванково) is a rural locality (a village) in Arkhangelskoye Rural Settlement, Sokolsky District, Vologda Oblast, Russia. The population was 5 as of 2002.

== Geography ==
Ivankovo is located 20 km northwest of Sokol (the district's administrative centre) by road. Mochalovo is the nearest rural locality.
