= Ivankovo, Sheksninsky District, Vologda Oblast =

Ivankovo Иванково
- Village
- Location within Vologda Oblast Location within Russia
- Coordinates: 59°16′N 38°22′E
- Country: Russia
- Region: Vologda Oblast
- District: Sheksninsky District
- Time zone: UTC+3:00

Ivankovo (Russian: Иванково) is a rural locality (a village) in Nifantovskoye Rural Settlement, Sheksninsky District, Vologda Oblast, Russia. The population was 14 as of 2002. There are 2 streets.

== Geography ==
Ivankovo is located 13 km northwest of Sheksna (the district's administrative centre) by road. Syamichi is the nearest rural locality.
