= Georgian Wings =

Georgian airline

IATA	ICAO	Call sign
D4	GEL	SKY GEORGIA
- Founded: 2017
- Ceased operations: 2025
- Operating bases: Tbilisi International Airport
- Fleet size: 3
- Destinations: 4
- Headquarters: Tbilisi, Georgia
- Website: georgianwings.com

Georgian Wings was the commercial part of Georgian cargo airline, Geosky, based at Tbilisi International Airport in Tbilisi, Georgia. It was founded in 2017 and operated in both local and international markets.

In April 2025, it was reported that Geosky had retired the Georgian Wings brand after ending passenger operations, and retiring their two Boeing 737 aircraft.

== Destinations ==
As of March 2024, Georgian Wings operates regular, scheduled services to the following destinations:

Country	City	Airport	Notes
Azerbaijan	Baku	Heydar Aliyev International Airport	Terminated
Czech Republic	Prague	Václav Havel Airport Prague	Terminated
Georgia	Batumi	Alexander Kartveli Batumi International Airport	Terminated
Georgia	Tbilisi	Shota Rustaveli Tbilisi International Airport	Hub
Moldova	Chișinău	Chișinău International Airport	
Turkey	Trabzon	Trabzon Airport	Terminated
Uzbekistan	Tashkent	Islam Karimov Tashkent International Airport	Terminated

== Fleet ==
As of March 2024, Georgian Wings operates the following aircraft:

Georgian Wings fleet
Aircraft	In Service	Orders	Passengers			Notes
Aircraft	In Service	Orders	C	Y	Total	Notes
ATR 72	2	0	0	70	70	
ATR 72	2	0	0	72	72	
Boeing 737-300	1	0	0	148	148	
Total	3	0				
