= Aerolínea Lanhsa =

Honduran airline

| IATA | ICAO | Call sign |
|---|---|---|
| — | LNH | — |
- Founded: 2011
- Ceased operations: April 2025
- Hubs: Golosón International Airport
- Fleet size: 2
- Destinations: 5
- Headquarters: La Ceiba, Honduras
- Website: www.lanhsahn.com

Lanhsa (Línea Aérea Nacional de Honduras S.A.) was a regional airline based in Honduras operating scheduled and charter services.

The airline ceased all operations in April 2025, following the crash of Aerolínea Lanhsa Flight 018.

== Destinations ==
As of March 2025:

- La Ceiba - Golosón International Airport (LCE)
- Roatan - Juan Manuel Gálvez International Airport (RTB)
- Guanaja - Guanaja Airport (GJA)
- Tegucigalpa - Toncontín International Airport (TGU)
- Puerto Lempira - Puerto Lempira Airport, (PEU)

== Fleet ==
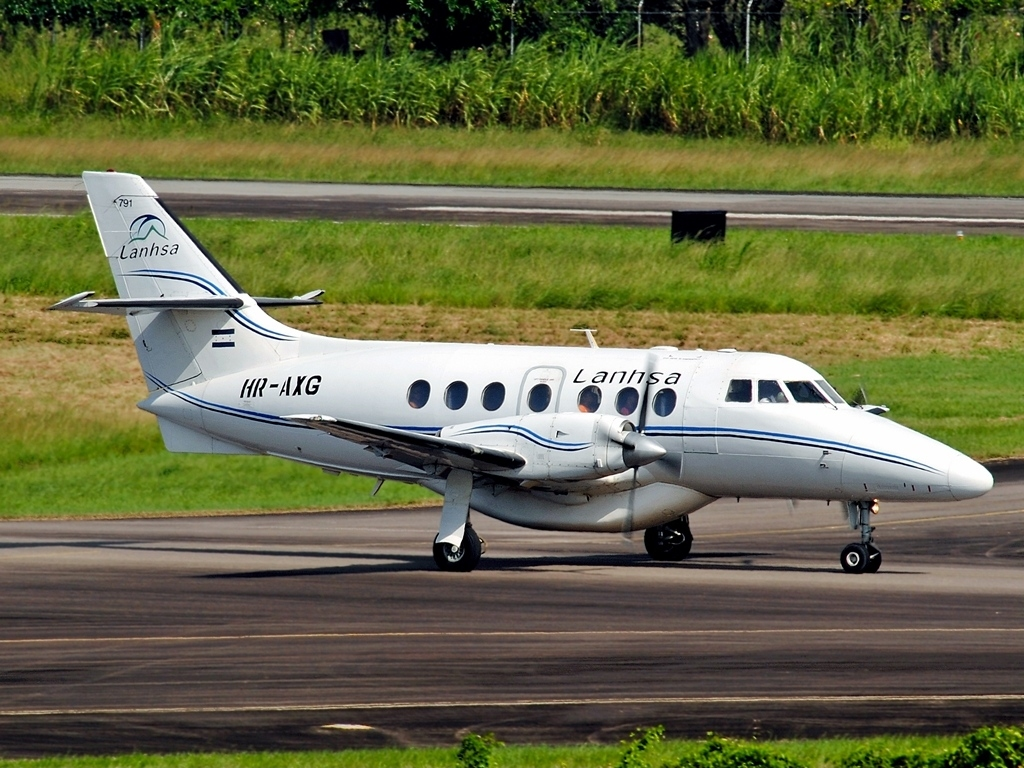
Lanhsa BAe Jetstream 31

=== Current fleet ===
As of July 2026, Aerolínea Lanhsa operates the following aircraft:

| Aircraft | In service | Orders | Passengers |
|---|---|---|---|
| BAe Jetstream 32 | 1 | — | |
| BAe Jetstream 41 | 1 | — | |
| Total | 2 | — | |

=== Former fleet ===
As of March 2025 Aerolínea Lanhsa operated:

- BAe Jetstream 31 - 4 aircraft
- BAe Jetstream 41 - 1 aircraft

== Accidents and incidents ==
- On 4 January 2022, a BAe Jetstream 31 (registered HR-AYY) with 18 passengers and a crew of two suffered a right landing gear collapse while landing at Juan Manuel Gálvez International Airport in Roatán from Guillermo Anderson International Airport in La Ceiba, causing the aircraft to run off the runway. All occupants were uninjured, but the aircraft was written off.
- March 17, 2025, Aerolínea Lanhsa Flight 018 crashed into the sea shortly after takeoff after a runway excursion, killing 13 of the plane's 18 occupants.
