= Antonov An-22 =

Soviet heavy military transport aircraft

Antonov An-22 "Antei"
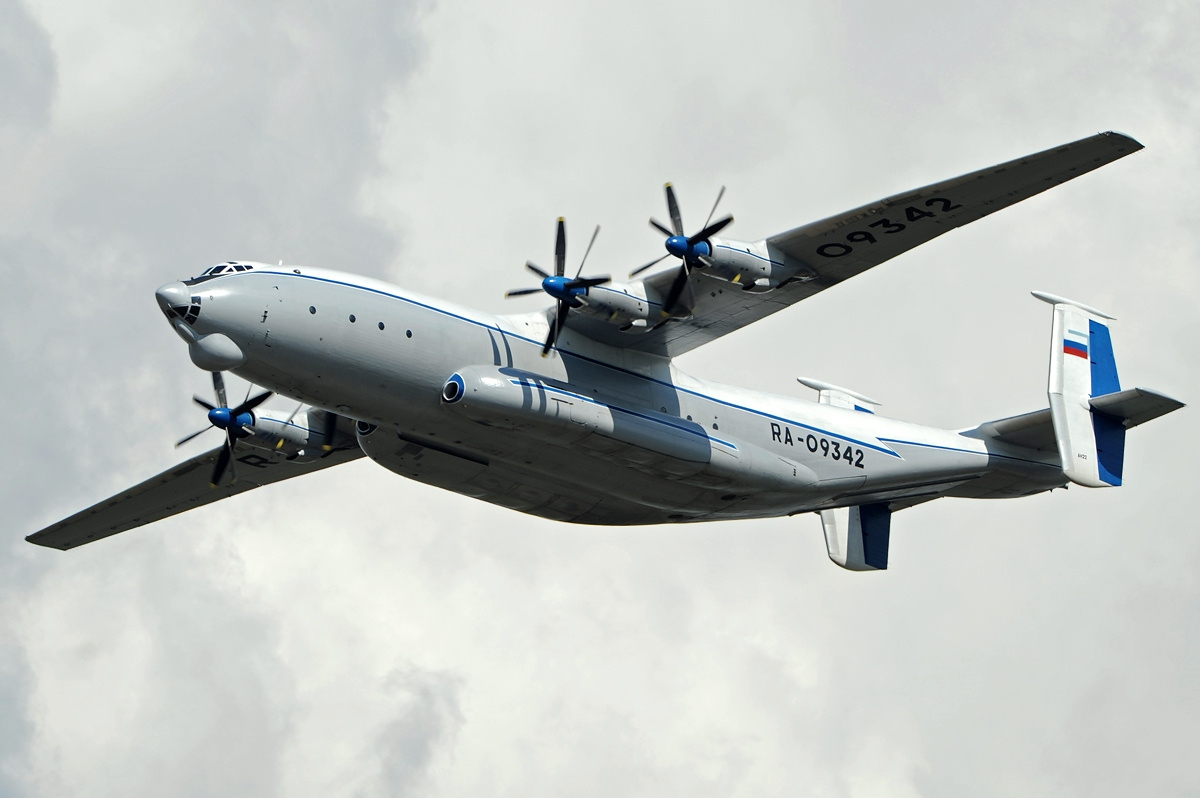
- Antonov An-22

General information
- Type: Strategic airlifter
- National origin: Soviet Union
- Manufacturer: Antonov
- Status: Retired
- Primary users: Russian Aerospace Forces Aeroflot; Antonov Airlines
- Number built: 68

History
- Manufactured: 1966–1976
- Introduction date: 1967
- First flight: 27 February 1965

The Antonov An-22 "Antei" (Russian: Ан-22 Антей, romanized: An-22 Antey; lit. 'Antaeus'; NATO reporting name: "Cock") is a retired heavy turboprop military transport aircraft developed by the Antonov Design Bureau and produced by the Tashkent State Aircraft Factory in the Soviet Union. It was the first wide-body transport aircraft and has continued to possess the largest cargo deck for any turboprop-powered aircraft in the world into the twenty-first century.

The An-22 was designed during the early 1960s; despite its large size, it had a relatively conventional configuration, possessing a high-mounted wing and being powered by four Kuznetsov NK-12MA turboprop engines that each drove a pair of contra-rotating propellers. The prototype An-22 made its maiden flight on 27 February 1965 and was first publicly displayed outside the Soviet Union at the Paris Air Show that same year. Entering service with the Soviet Air Force in 1967, the type was widely used in its logistical role. It routinely performed long-distance airlifts, such as to Peru in July 1970 following the Ancash earthquake. During the Soviet invasion of Afghanistan, An-22s were used to transport Soviet Airborne Troops (VDV) into the theatre. Other key operations during the Cold War era included transport duties in response to the Chernobyl disaster and the delivery of Soviet military equipment to Angola.

At the time of the Dissolution of the Soviet Union, the majority of the An-22s were located in Russia, and thus were adopted by the Russian Aerospace Forces, which continued to operate the type until 2025. A few aircraft were in Ukraine at the time of the dissolution, and were operated for a time by the charter cargo operator Antonov Airlines; charters included NATO's SALIS programme. Russian use of the An-22 came to an abrupt end following the crash of the last operational aircraft during a test flight in December 2025.

== Development ==
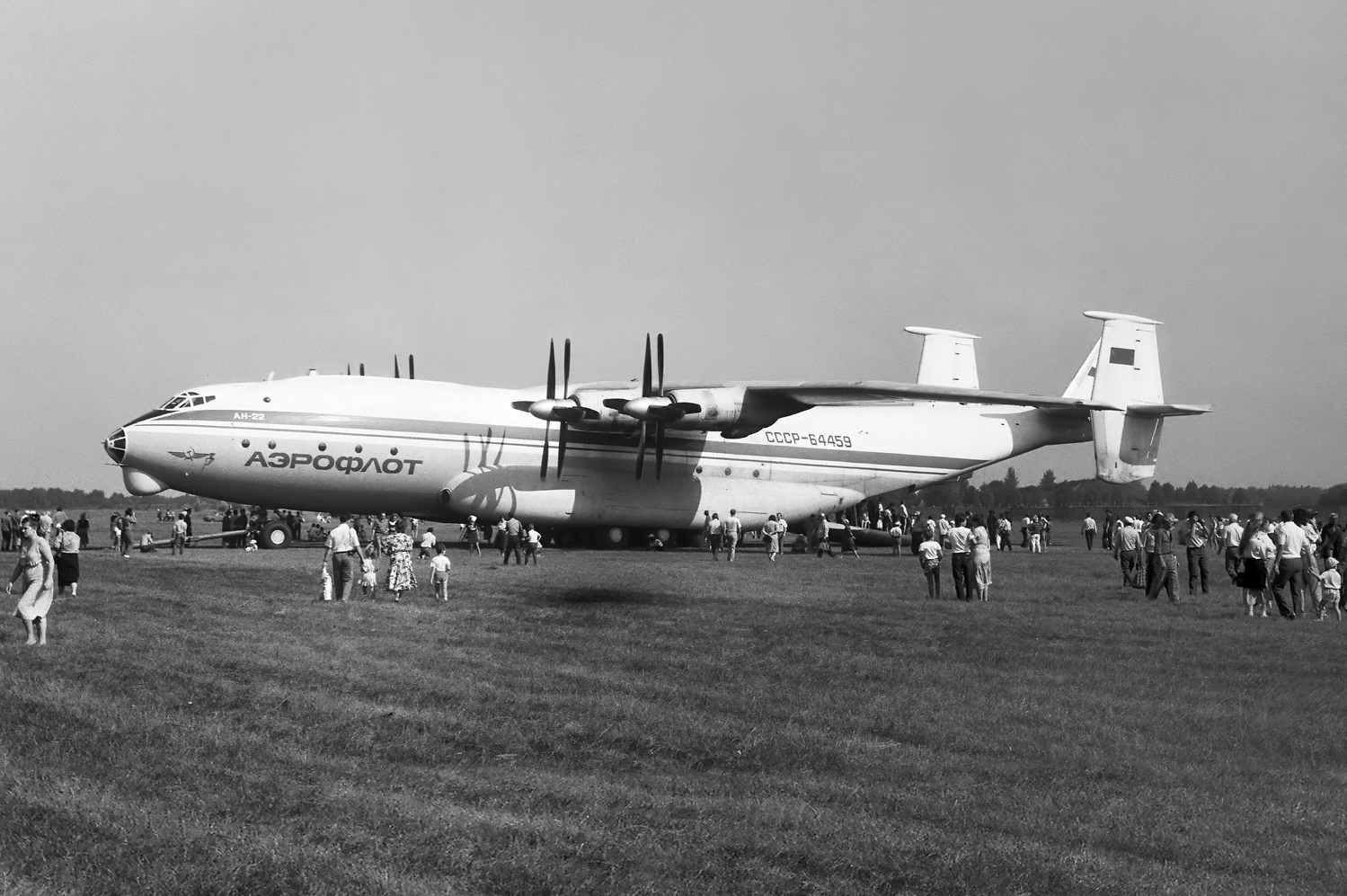
First prototype of the An-22 (CCCP-64459; currently UR-64459), pictured in 1991 at Gostomel Airport.

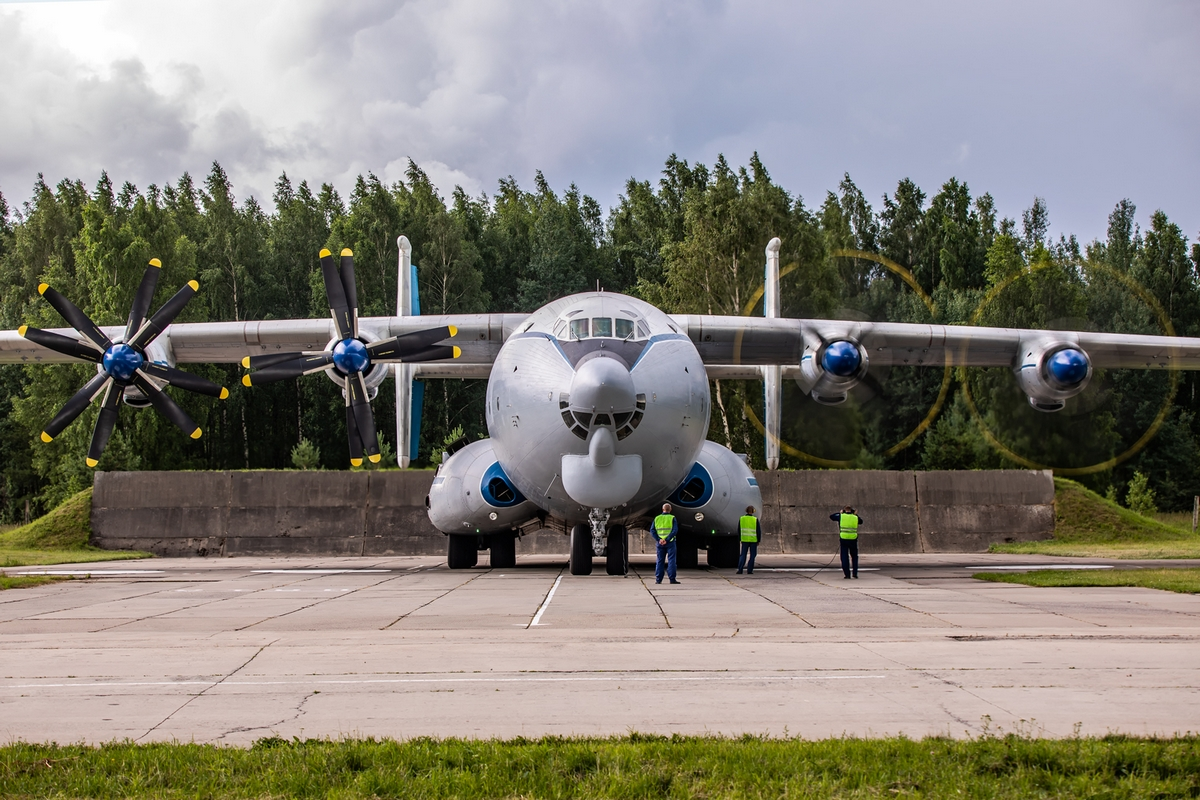
Front view

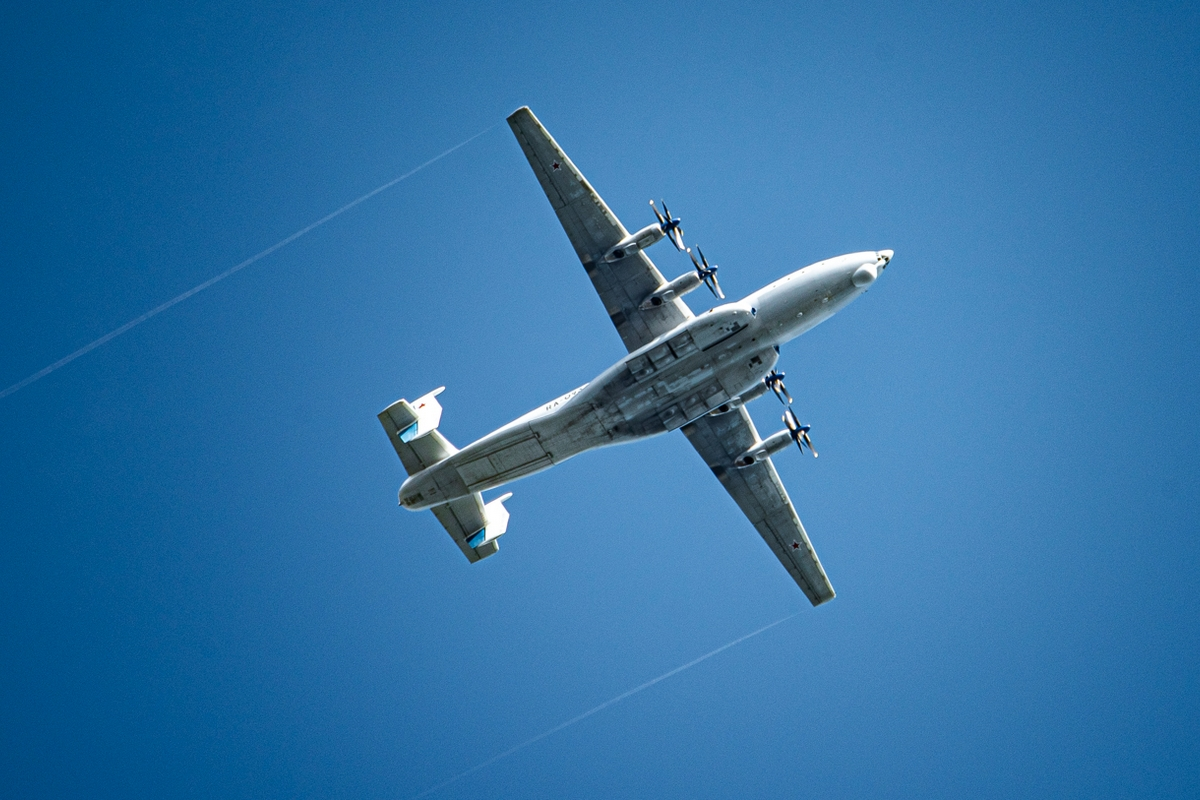
Bottom view

The impetus for the development of the Antonov An-22 can be traced back to the late 1950s and the military requirements of the Soviet Union, which sought a large strategic airlifter to supplement the smaller Antonov An-8 and An-12s transport aircraft that were being introduced around this time. The Ministry of Defense sought an airlifter that could transport various outsized cargoes, including intercontinental ballistic missiles (ICBMs) and military vehicles that were previously restricted to being transported by rail as well as various outsized cargoes. One specific desire was to expand the Soviet Airborne Forces' capability to land with their then-new BMD-1 armoured vehicles. Accordingly, the prospectively airlifter's cargo hold had to accommodate no less than four BMD-1s (the preceding An-12 could only a single BMD-1).

During the early 1960s, the Antonov bureau produced a wooden mock up at its workshops in Kyiv, Ukraine, which was internally referred to as the Model 100. Originally designated as the An-20, the general configuration of this aircraft was fairly conventional, being powered by four engines that were installed on a high-mounted wing. Visually, the aircraft appeared to be an enlarged version of the earlier Antonov An-12, except that it was furnished with a twin tail, which gave the An-22 better engine-out performance as well as a reduced height restrictions for hangars. On top of each tail fin were sizable anti-flutter masses.

On 18 August 1964, the first of two prototype, now designated the An-22, was rolled out; it performed its maiden flight on 27 February 1965. This prototype was given the name Antaeus (sometimes misspelled Antheus) and, after four months of test-flying, was publicly displayed at the 1965 Paris Air Show. All of the production standard An-22s were constructed at the Tashkent State Aircraft Factory, the first pair of production aircraft were delivered to the Air Transport Wing at Ivanovo Airbase in 1969.

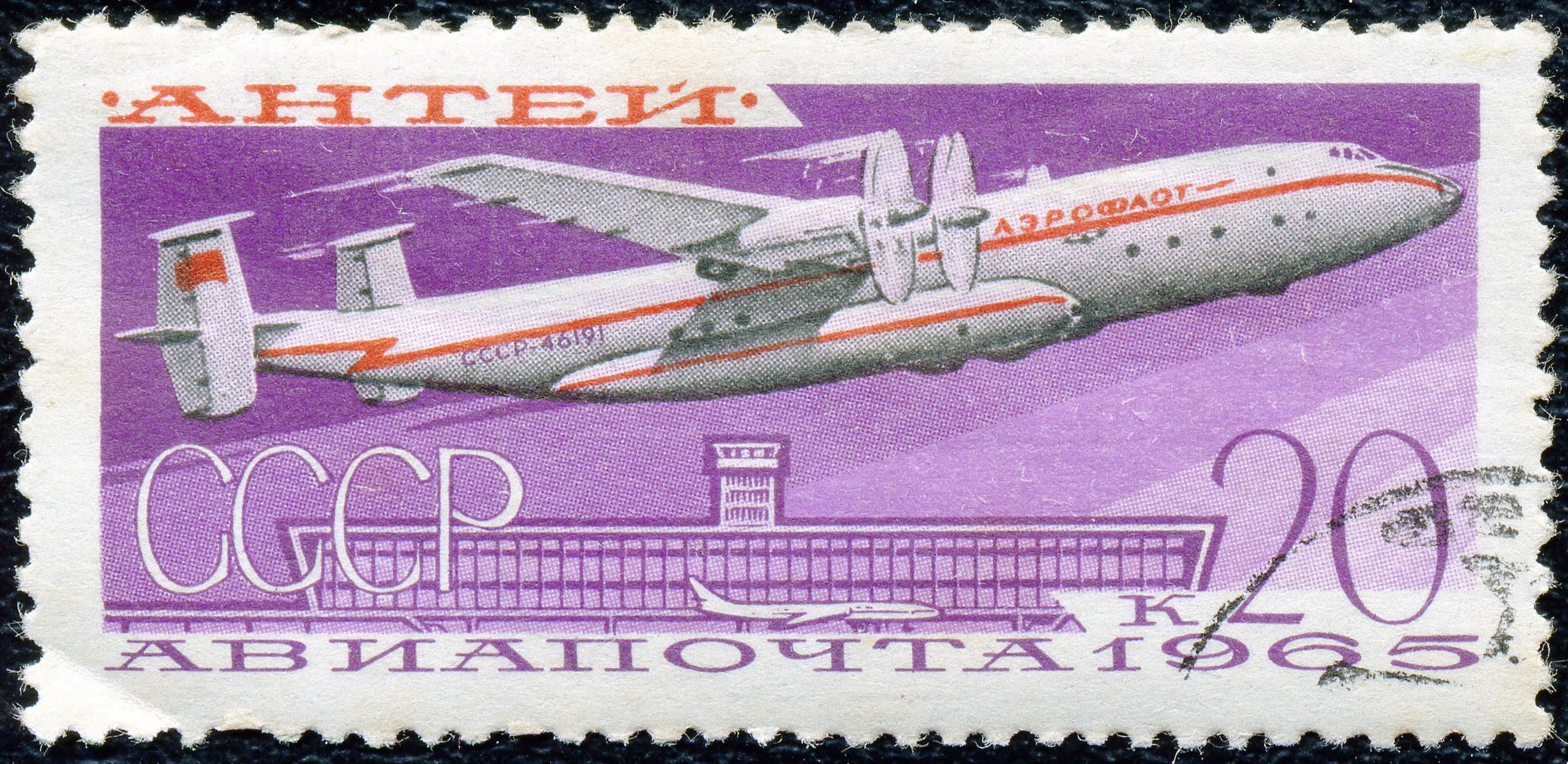
Soviet 1965 postage stamp showcasing the An-22 success at the Paris Air Show

There was a few differences between the production standard An-22s and the prototype. One of the most visually apparent was that the prototype was provisioned with a fully-glazed nose, and thus lacked the nose-mounted radar arrangement that was used on production aircraft. Instead, these aircraft had their radar apparatus mounted below the right wheel well fairing, just forward of the wheels.

Antonov worked on multiple improvements and derivatives of the An-22. One variant, which featured a modified electrical system, different navigation apparatus, and an additional augmented flight control system, was referred to by the company as the An-22A, but this designation was never used by the military. A civil airliner variant was also studied; it was to feature a lengthened fuselage and be capable of seating up to 724 passengers across its upper and lower decks, however, no such aircraft were ever built.

=== Total production ===
Total production	1975	1974	1973	1972	1971	1970	1969	1968	1967	1966	1965	1964	1963
68	12	9	9	8	8	7	7	1	1	4	1	0	1

== Design ==
The Antonov An-22 was powered by a total of four Kuznetsov NK-12MA turboprop engines, each capable of generating up to 15,000 shp, which drove contra-rotating constant speed propellers, in a similar arranged to the contemporary Tupolev Tu-114 airliner. One advantage of the contra-rotating propeller arrangement was reduced noise. Both the propellers and exhaust from the engines produced a slipstream over the wings and the large double-slotted flaps.

Amongst the traditional design features present on the An-22 was its use of a high-mounted wing, which permitted a relatively large cargo deck, possessing 33 m in length and a usable volume of 639 m^{3}. This cargo deck was pressurized to a relatively low level, only 3.55 PSI / 0.245 bar, which permitted the use of a lighter airframe. A door equipped with a pressure bulkhead is located at frame 14, separating the cargo attendant's compartment from the main cargo deck; this arrangement permitted the rear cargo doors to be opened during flight for dropping paratroopers and equipment alike. To aid in the loading and unloading of cargo, a total of four cranes, which possessed a combined carrying capacity of 22,046lb (10 tonnes), were typically installed in the cargo bay.

The flight deck typically accommodated a pair of pilots, two engineers and a radio operator; the navigator sat at a separate station located below, within the aircraft’s nose. All crew members were located in the fully pressurized forward section of the aircraft, which comprised only a small area relative to the whole aircraft; in addition to the flight deck, it consisted of a compact galley, lavatory, and several bunk beds, across two decks.

While early versions of the An-22 were dependent upon the presence of an external air start cart in order to start its engines, some later-build aircraft were provided with an onboard auxiliary power unit (APU). Further changes included a revised electrical system and alternative navigational apparatus. It was common for the An-22 to fly with multiple spare tires onboard to mitigate potential damage from a hard impact while landing on unprepared surfaces. The An-22 had the capability to takeoff from austere, unpaved, and short airstrips, allowing airborne troops to perform air-landing operations. Into the twenty-first century, the type remained unique amongst strategic airlifters for its level of compatibility with compact unimproved airstrips. The landing gear was relatively rugged and thus suited to rough airstrips. Early production aircraft were able to adjust tire pressures in flight to achieve optimum landing performance. However, this feature was not present on later-build An-22s.

== Operational history ==
The An-22 was originally built for the Soviet Air Force, several Military Transport Aviation units were equipped with the type. The 12th Mginsk Red Banner Military Transport Aviation Division (based at Migalovo) was one of the units which had its three regiments entirely equipped with the An-22s. Another unit that operated it was the 566th Solnechnogorsk Military Transport Aviation Regiment, which flew the An-22 between 1970 and 1987.

During its lengthy career, the An-22 set 41 separate would records pertaining to speed, payload and payload-to-altitude.

An early use of the An-22 was to deliver Soviet humanitarian aid to Peru in July 1970 following the Ancash earthquake. One An-22 disappeared on 18 July during these relief flights. An-22s were also used to deliver Soviet military aid to Egypt and Syria during the Yom Kippur War in 1973, to Angola in 1975, and to Ethiopia in 1977.

During the early 1970s, officials within the Military Transport Aviation Command concluded that it still lacked sufficient strategic heavy airlift capacity, despite the presence of roughly 50 An-22s in its fleet, and that the USSR was not yet able to match the US's long-range heavy lift capabilities. Rather than simply acquiring additional airlifters of an existing model, a substantial increase in payload capacity was also desired so that the same task could be completed with fewer trips. Accordingly, Antonov ultimately produced the An-124 Ruslan, a larger turbofan-powered airlifter, although this did not fly until 1982.

Multiple An-22s from Migalovo were used for the initial deployment of the Soviet Airborne Troops (VDV) during the 1979 Soviet invasion of Afghanistan. One An-22 was shot down at takeoff (probably by an SA-7 missile) near Kabul on 28 October 1984 with about 250 casualties as the aircraft was used as troop carrier.

In 1984, An-22s were used to deliver Mi-8 helicopters to Ethiopia during drought relief operations.

In 1986, the 8th Military Air Transport Aviation Regiment used its aircraft to deliver key materials during the Chernobyl disaster relief operation.

During 1987, the An-22s were used to deliver military equipment to Angola. One year later, the fleet was used to deliver 15,000 tons and 1,000 personnel for the 1988 Armenian earthquake relief operation.

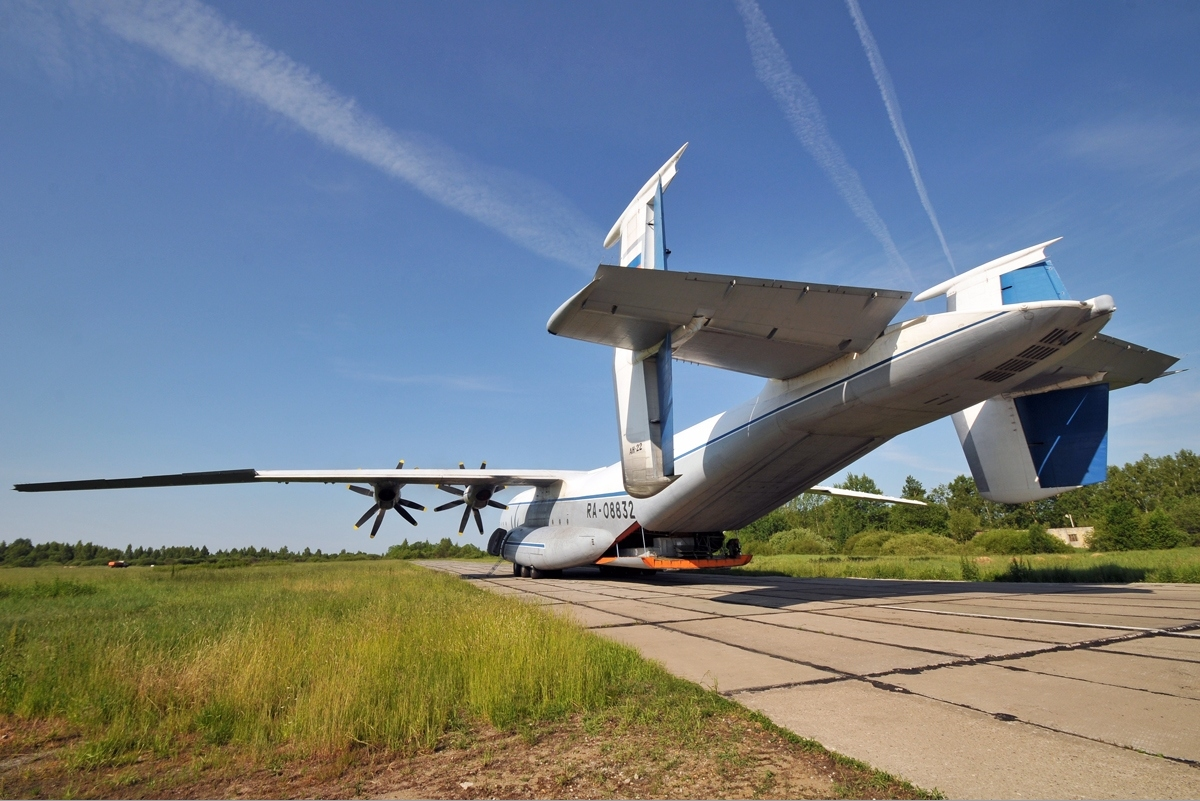
View of an An-22 from behind

The An-22 were often seen at the Le Bourget Air Show, and in 1988 delivered an engine from the Antonov An-124 to the Farnborough Airshow.

In late 1980s, numerous An-22s were put into storage. Around this time, the fleet was also being actively used to deliver internal troops to numerous regional conflicts that arose on the years running up to the dissolution of the Soviet Union.

At the time of the dissolution, the majority of the An-22s were located in Russian territory and thus were adopted by the newly-formed Russian Aerospace Forces. Additionally, a handful of aircraft were in Ukraine; this led to several being refurbished and operated for a time by the charter cargo operator Antonov Airlines. Reportedly, only two airframes were ever used commercially.

During the early 1990s, the first production An-22 was briefly leased to a pair of Bulgarian operators, Sigi Air Cargo and Air Sofia.

In 1995, An-22s transported a Russian peacekeeping force from the 98th Guards Airborne Division during the Bosnian War.

Approximately 45 An-22s remained in service by the mid-1990s, mostly with the Russian Air Force, being slowly replaced by the bigger turbofan-powered Antonov An-124. Furthermore, several other An-22s were operated by an independent military transport aviation squadron at Migalovo base in Tver. Russian operations were dependent on support provided by Antonov; as a result of increased political tensions between Ukraine and Russia during the 2010s and 2020s, cumulating in the Russian invasion of Ukraine in February 2022, this support was withdrawn, which hampered Russia's ability to maintain and repair its Antonov-built aircraft.

By December 2018, six An-22s were listed in service with the 76th Military Transport Air Squadron at Tver, although only three aircraft were reportedly airworthy. At the time, the type was planned to remain in Russian service until 2033.

In September 2016, a single An-22 (registration number UR-09307) was returned to operational service for civil purposes with Antonov Airlines. Later that same year, it started flying aid into Gao International Airport in Mali, taking advantage of its ability to operate from rough airstrips as the infrastructure had been damaged by war. This same aircraft later saw use under NATO's SALIS programme, based at Leipzig/Halle airport for charter flights.

Ukraine's last airworthy An-22 was damaged in February 2022 during the Battle of Antonov Airport amid the initial combat of the Russian invasion of Ukraine.

In August 2024, reports indicated that Russia had ceased operating their remaining An-22s, and that Antei RF-09309 was being flown to Yekaterinburg to be prepared for a museum display. On 9 December 2025, the last operational An-22 crashed in the Ivanovo region, north-east of Moscow; seven people on board were presumed dead; witnesses on the ground stated that the aircraft had broken up in midair.

== Variants ==
The An-22 was capable of operations at airports with unpaved runways

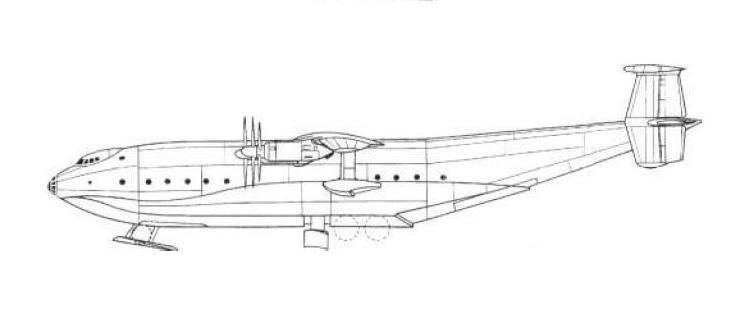
Drawing of the An-22's proposed amphibious variant

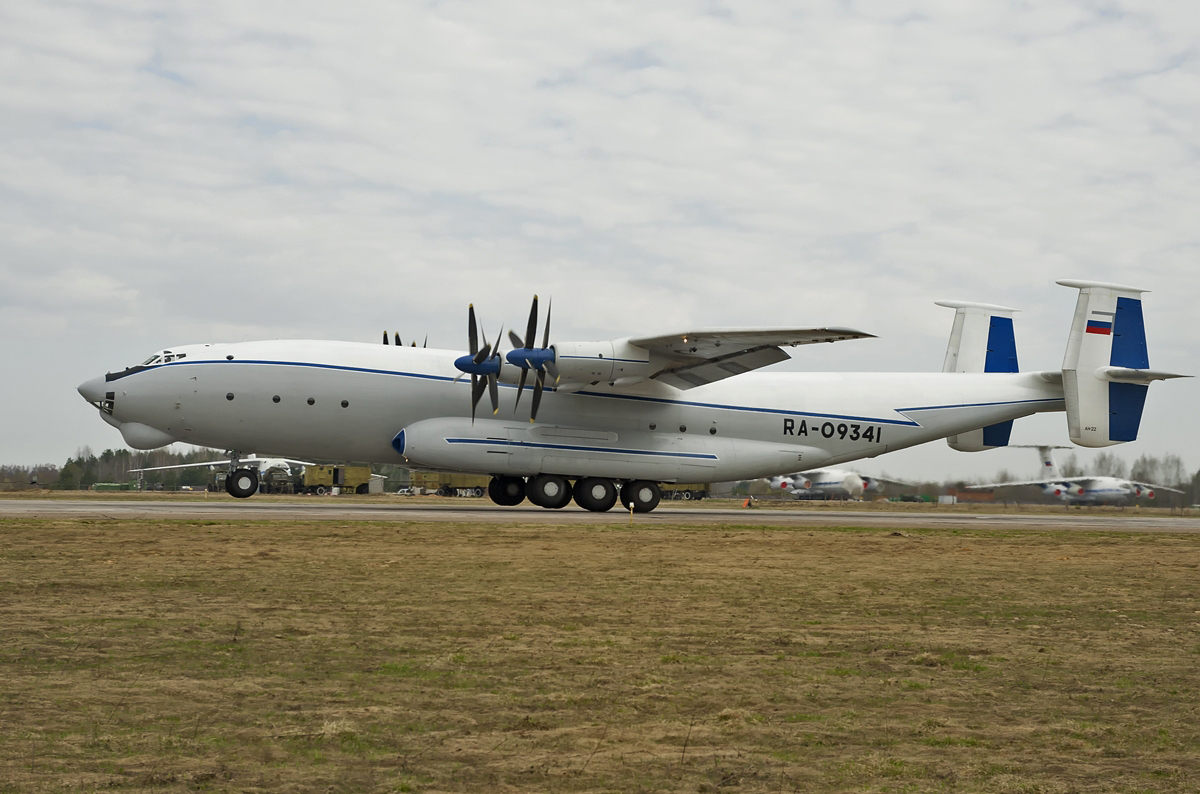
Side profile

An-22
Three original prototypes were built at the Antonov facility in Kyiv, with glass nose.
Amphibious An-22
An amphibian version of the An-22 was proposed, but did not progress past the scale model phase.
An-22
Initial production variant with external start system, 37 built at Tashkent.
An-22A
Improved variant with air-start capability, modified electrical system, and updated radio and navigation equipment, 28 built at Tashkent.
An-22PZ
Conversion of two An-22s to carry wing centre sections or outer wings of Antonov An-124 or An-225 externally above fuselage. Fitted with third centreline fin.

Several other An-22 variants were projected and constructed by Antonov but never entered serial production, notably a nuclear-powered aircraft and a ballistic missile platform.

== Operators ==
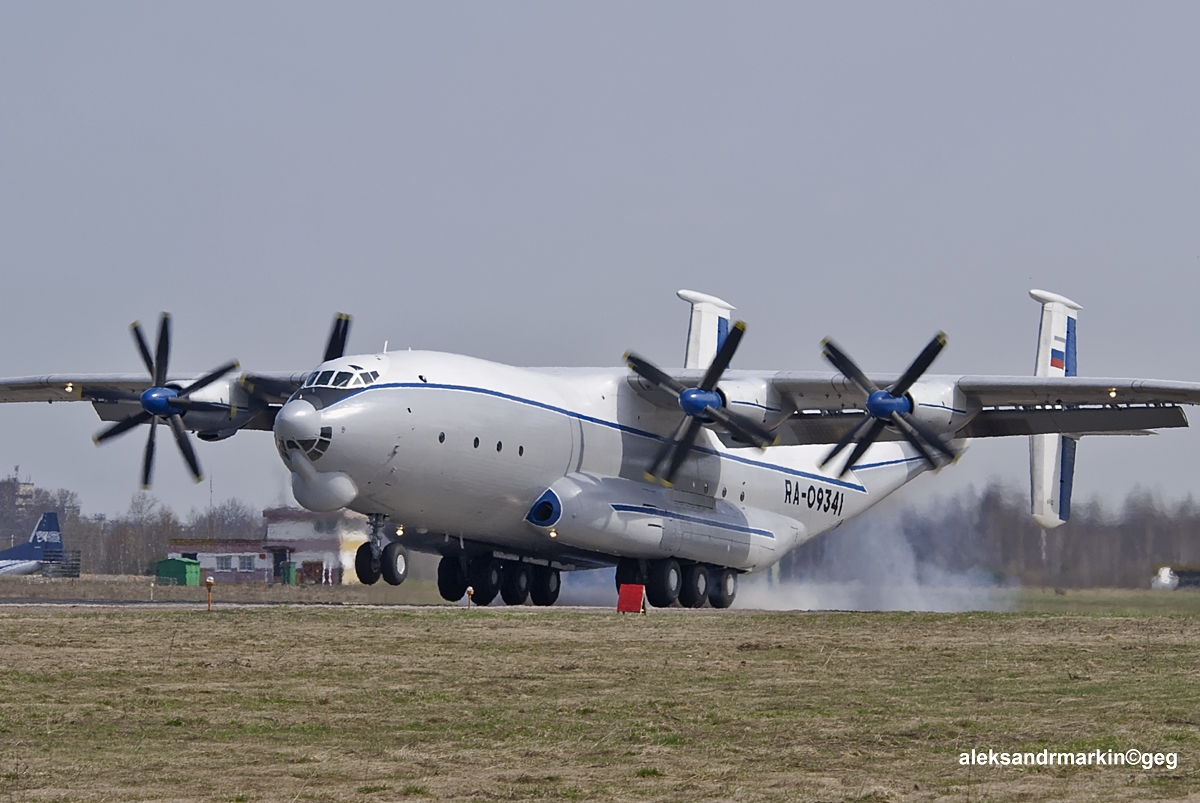
An-22 of the Russian Air Force

=== Military ===
==== Former ====
Russia

- The Russian Aerospace Forces owns 11 aircraft, none of which are in active service.

Soviet Union

- Soviet Air Force

- 8th Military Transport Aviation Regiment
- Other regiments

=== Civil ===
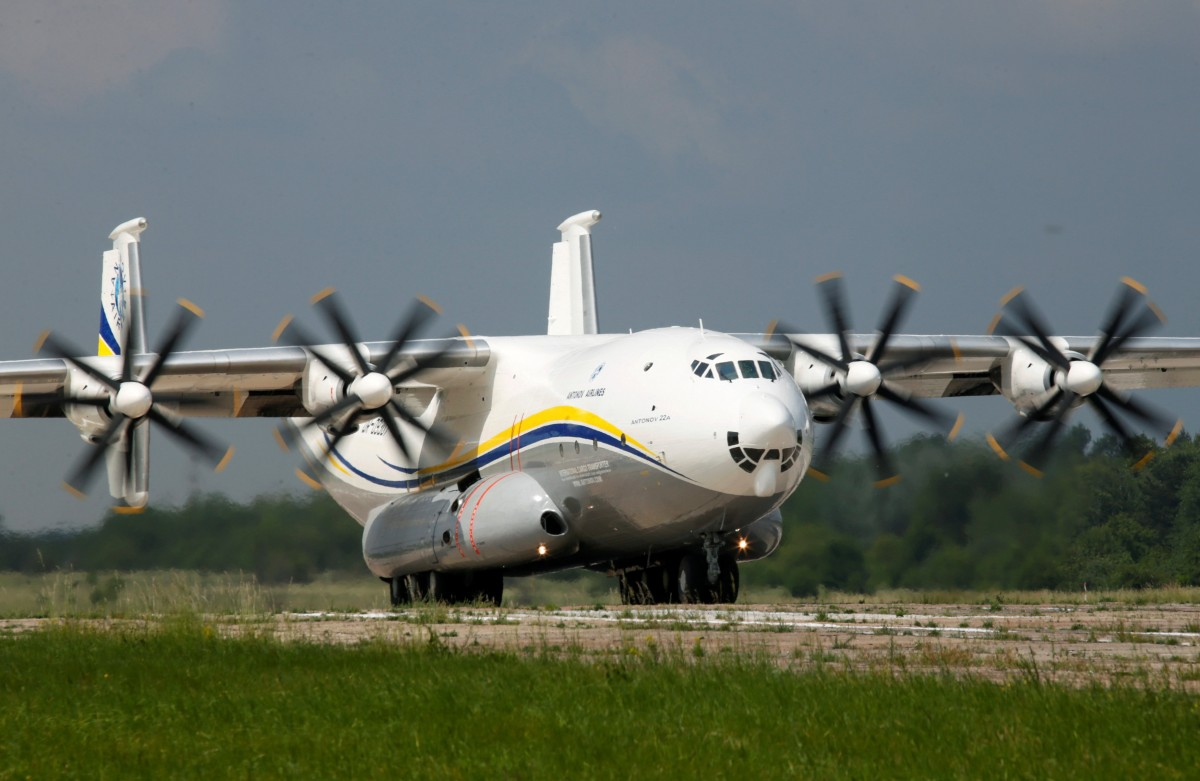
An-22 of Antonov Airlines

==== Current ====
Ukraine

- Antonov Airlines – a single An-22 (registration number UR-09307) was in service with Antonov Airlines in September 2020. During the Russian invasion of Ukraine at the Battle of Antonov Airport in late February 2022, the aircraft reportedly suffered substantial damage when penetrated by projectiles.

==== Former ====
Bulgaria

- Air Sofia (leased)

== Incidents and accidents ==
As of December 2025, there have been 10 hull losses with a total of 110 fatalities.

Date	Registration	Location	Fatalities	Brief description
18 July 1970	СССР-09303	The Atlantic Ocean near Keflavík International Airport, Iceland	All of 7 passengers + 15 crew	Was transporting humanitarian aid to Lima, Peru. Radar contact was lost 47 minutes after takeoff from Keflavík International Airport.
28 December 2010	RA-09343	Near Krasny Oktyabr (Tula Oblast, Russia)	All 12 crew (no passengers)	RA-09343 of the Russian Air Force crashed killing all twelve crew. The aircraft was on a positioning flight from Voronezh Airport to Migalovo airbase. The aircraft had been in storage since 2001 and was brought back into flying condition in January 2010.
9 December 2025	RF-08832	Ivanovo region	Both passengers + 5 crew	The last operational An-22 was being operated by the Russian Air Force. It came down over the Uvodskoye Reservoir in Ivanovo Oblast, Russia. The aircraft was on a test flight from Ivanovo Severny air base after repairs.

== Aircraft on display ==
An An-22 is on display at the Technik Museum Speyer in Speyer, Germany.

== Specifications (An-22) ==
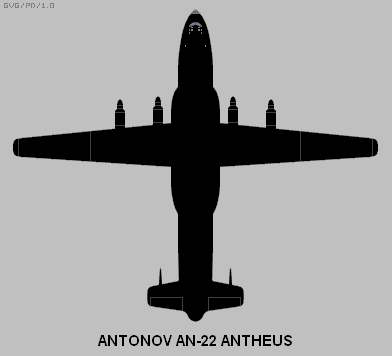
Dorsally projected diagram of the Antonov An-22 Antheus.

Data from Jane's all the world's aircraft, 1991–92

General characteristics

- Crew: 5–6
- Capacity: 28–29 passengers / 80,000 kg (176,370 lb) maximum payload
- Length: 57.92 m (190 ft 0 in) approximate (dependent on nose configuration)
- Wingspan: 64.4 m (211 ft 3 in)
- Height: 12.53 m (41 ft 1 in)
- Wing area: 345 m^{2} (3,710 sq ft)
- Airfoil: root:TsAGI S-5-16; tip: TsAGI S-5-13
- Empty weight: 114,000 kg (251,327 lb)
- Max takeoff weight: 250,000 kg (551,156 lb)
- Fuel capacity: 43,000 kg (94,799 lb) maximum
- Powerplant: 4 × Kuznetsov NK-12MA turboprop engines, 11,000 kW (15,000 shp) each (equivalent)
- Propellers: 8-bladed contra-rotating constant-speed reversible-pitch propeller

Performance

- Maximum speed: 740 km/h (460 mph, 400 kn)
- Range: 5,000 km (3,100 mi, 2,700 nmi) with maximum payload

10,950 km (6,800 mi; 5,910 nmi) with maximum fuel and 45,000 kg (99,208 lb) payload

- Service ceiling: 9,100 m (29,900 ft)
- Wing loading: 724.6 kg/m^{2} (148.4 lb/sq ft) max
- Power/mass: 0.1789 kW/kg (0.1088 hp/lb) max
- Take-off run: 1,300 m (4,265 ft)
- Landing run: 800 m (2,625 ft)

== See also ==
Related development

- Antonov An-12 – Soviet medium-range transport aircraft

Aircraft of comparable role, configuration, and era

- Douglas C-133 Cargomaster – US heavy lift four engine turboprop military aircraft, 1956
- Boeing C-17 Globemaster III – American four engine military transport aircraft
- Ilyushin Il-76 – Russian heavy four-engined military transport jet aircraft
- Xi'an Y-20 – Chinese military transport aircraft
- Airbus A400M Atlas – Multi-national four-engine turboprop military transport aircraft
- Short Belfast - British military transport aircraft

Related lists

- List of military aircraft of the Soviet Union and the CIS
