= List of accidents and incidents involving the McDonnell Douglas DC-10 =

The McDonnell Douglas DC-10 had been involved in 55 accidents and incidents, including 32 hull-loss accidents, with 1,261 occupant fatalities. It was eventually replaced by more advanced and fuel-efficient twin-engine airliners, such as the Boeing 777 and the Airbus A330. The last passenger DC-10 was retired in 2014 by Biman Bangladesh Airlines. However, some DC-10's are still in service as cargo planes KC-10 or aerial tankers DC-10 Air Tanker and emergency service aircraft.

== History of accidents ==
The DC-10's first accident happened on the 12 June 1972 with American Airlines Flight 96. The aircraft suffered a cargo door failure due to a design flaw, leading to rapid decompression. The pilot managed to make an emergency landing and all 67 occupants escaped safely.

The DC-10's second accident happened on the 3 November 1973 with National Airlines Flight 27 in which the aircraft had an uncontained engine failure while it was en route over New Mexico. The crew made an emergency landing and 127 of the 128 occupants survived.

The DC-10's third accident happened on the 17 December 1973 with Iberia Flight 933 in which the accident happened due to pilot error leading to spatial disorientation in which the pilot emergency landed the aircraft and all 168 occupants on board evacuated successfully with 13 minor and 3 serious injuries.

== Accidents and incidents by death toll ==
346: The DC-10's deadliest crash happened on the 3 March 1974 with Turkish Airlines Flight 981(TK981/THY981) was a scheduled flight from Istanbul Yeşilköy Airport to London Heathrow Airport, with an intermediate stop at Orly Airport in Paris. On 3 March 1974, the McDonnell Douglas DC-10 operating the flight crashed into the Ermenonville Forest, outside Paris, killing all 346 occupants on board.

273: The DC-10's second deadliest accident occurred on May 25, 1979, on a scheduled flight from Chicago O'Hare to Los Angeles International Airport. During takeoff, American Airlines Flight 191's left engine and pylon separated from the wing due to a maintenance-related issue. The aircraft rolled to the left and crashed into a field outside of the airport. All 271 people on board the aircraft, as well as two people on the ground, lost their lives and it was the deadliest aviation accident in the United States and in North America until the September 11 attacks.

257: The DC-10's third deadliest crash happened with Air New Zealand Flight 901 on November 28, 1979. The aircraft was on a sightseeing flight over Antarctica when, due to a navigational error, the aircraft crashed into Mount Erebus on Ross Island under reduced visibility due to whiteout conditions with all 257 occupants dying. The tragedy of Air New Zealand Flight 901 remains one of the deadliest aviation accidents in New Zealand's history. The subsequent investigation led to changes in aviation regulations, improved crew training, and enhanced safety measures to prevent similar incidents in the future.

170: The DC-10's fourth deadliest incident happened on the 19 September 1989 with UTA Flight 772 when a bomb exploded on board the aircraft while it was flying over the Sahara Desert in Niger. The explosion resulted in the structural failure of the DC-10, leading to the crash and all 170 occupants on board dying. The investigation and subsequent legal proceedings led to international efforts to bring those responsible for the bombing to justice. In 1999, a French court convicted six Libyans in absentia for their involvement in the bombing.

112: The DC-10's fifth deadliest crash happened on the 19 July 1989 with United Airlines Flight 232. The aircraft experienced a catastrophic failure of its tail-mounted engine while cruising at high altitude, resulting in the loss of all three hydraulic systems that rendered the flight control surfaces inoperable. The flight crew, led by Captain Al Haynes, skillfully managed to control the aircraft using differential engine thrust. The DC-10 made a crash landing at Sioux City, Iowa, with the assistance of the throttle controls. Despite the severity of the crash, 184 of the 296 people on board survived.

80: The DC-10’s sixth deadliest crash occurred on 27 July 1989 with Korean Air Flight 803 was a scheduled international passenger flight from Seoul, South Korea to Tripoli, Libya that crashed on July 27, 1989. The crash killed 75 of the 199 people on board and four people on the ground. The cause of the crash was determined to be pilot error in low visibility conditions in what is still Libya's worst aviation disaster. The aircraft, a 16-year-old McDonnell Douglas DC-10-30 with the registration number HL7328, had at the time of the accident, performed 11,440

73: The DC-10’s seventh deadliest crash happened on October 31, 1979 with Western Airlines Flight 2605 when it mistakenly landed on a closed runway at Mexico City International Airport, killing 72 out of the 88 occupants and one person on the ground. The accident was attributed to several factors including crew confusion, miscommunication, and inadequate approach procedures. The incident led to improvements on runway markings, approach procedures, and crew training to prevent similar accidents in the future.

56: The DC-10’s eighth deadliest crash happened on December 12, 1992 with Martinair Flight 495. When a large thunderstorm had developed near Faro airport, accompanied by heavy rain, windshear and low cloud. The control tower informed the crew of the thunderstorm activity, in addition to stating that there was water on the runway. Following one unsuccessful landing attempt, the crew attempted a VOR/DME procedure approach to runway 11 (later runway 10), during which the aircraft flew through at least two microbursts. According to the Portuguese final accident report, firefighters saw an explosion coming from the aircraft 22 seconds before it crashed.

50: The DC-10’s ninth deadliest crash happened on September 13, 1982 with Spantax Flight 995, a charter flight from Madrid-Barajas Airport to New Yorkvia Málaga Airport on September 13, 1982. When the DC-10 aircraft was rolling for take-off from Malaga, the pilot felt a strong and worsening vibration and aborted the take-off. The flight crew lost control of the aircraft and were unable to stop in the runway available and the aircraft overran the runway, hit an airfield aerial installation, losing an engine, then crossed the Malaga–Torremolinos Highway, hitting a number of vehicles before finally hitting a railway embankment and bursting into flames. An emergency evacuation of the aircraft was carried out but 50 on board died of both burns and other injuries. A further 110 people were hospitalized.

18: The DC-10’s 10th deadliest crash happened on December 21, 1999 when Cubana de Aviación Flight 1216 overran the runway at La Aurora International Airport, Guatemala City. 8 passengers and 8 crew members on board were killed as well as two people on the ground. Flight 1216 was a special charter transporting Guatemalan students home from universities in Cuba. The aircraft took off from José Martí International Airport in Cuba with 296 passengers and 18 crew on board. After a two-hour flight the aircraft was cleared to land on Runway 19 at La Aurora International Airport. On landing the pilots were unable to stop the aircraft and it ran off the end of the runway and down a slope, crashing into ten houses. The accident killed 18 people in all: 8 passengers and eight crew members on board the aircraft, and two occupants of the houses. The remaining 288 passengers and 10 crew who survived; however 37 passengers and crew and another 20 people on the ground were injured in the accident. The aircraft was damaged beyond repair and written off.
