= Wien Consolidated Airlines Flight 55 =

1968 aviation accident

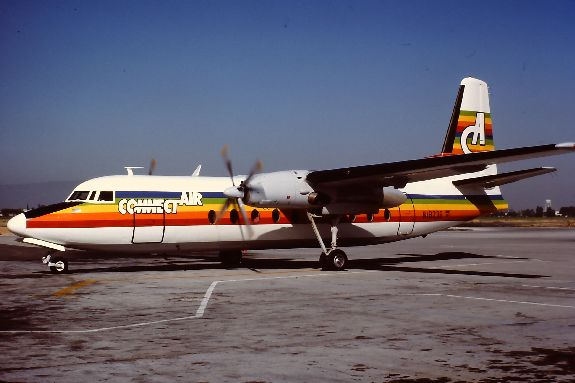
- A Fairchild F-27 similar to the accident aircraft

Accident
- Date: December 2, 1968; 9:36 am AKST
- Summary: Structural failure due to fatigue cracks on the wing
- Site: Pedro Bay, Alaska, U.S.; 59°46′17″N 154°08′28″W

Aircraft
- Aircraft type: Fairchild F-27B
- Operator: Wien Consolidated Airlines
- Registration: N4905
- Flight origin: Anchorage, Alaska
- 1st stopover: Iliamna, Alaska
- 2nd stopover: Big Mountain, Alaska
- 3rd stopover: King Salmon, Alaska
- Destination: Dillingham, Alaska
- Occupants: 39
- Passengers: 36
- Crew: 3
- Fatalities: 39
- Injuries: 0
- Survivors: 0

Wien Consolidated Airlines Flight 55 was a scheduled domestic passenger flight in Alaska that crashed into Pedro Bay on December 2, 1968, killing all 39 on board. The Fairchild F-27B aircraft was operated by Wien Consolidated Airlines and was en route to Dillingham from Anchorage, with three intermediate stops. The NTSB investigation revealed that the aircraft suffered a structural failure after encountering "severe-to-extreme" air turbulence. The accident was the second-worst accident involving a Fairchild F-27 at the time, and currently the third-worst accident involving the aircraft.

== Flight ==
Flight 55 was served by a Fairchild F-27B, a twin-engine propjet aircraft that had been in service since 1959. The aircraft was piloted by Captain David Stanley, who had been a pilot for Northern Consolidated Airlines for seven years before that airline was merged into Wien Consolidated Airlines. Prior to that, he had been a flight instructor in Anchorage, and was described as an excellent pilot.

Flight 55 departed Anchorage International Airport on Monday, December 2, at 8:46 am AKST, and proceeded 150 miles (240 km) southwest to Iliamna without reported difficulties. At 9:25 am, first officer Jerry Svengard contacted Iliamna air traffic control to request an approach clearance, which was granted at 9:26 am.

== Crash ==
While preparing to approach Iliamna, the aircraft encountered extreme turbulence at 11,500 feet (3,500 m). Local witnesses reported hearing an explosion and seeing a fireball in the vicinity of the aircraft's tail before it descended in a steep, uncontrolled spiral towards the ground. Other witnesses reported large quantities of black smoke from behind the wing of the aircraft, and that the plane continued on course for a short period of time, before pieces separated from the aircraft and it entered a dive.The aircraft crashed into Foxys Lake, Pedro Bay, an area described as being a frozen marshland surrounded by mountains.

Heavy winds gusting up to 55 miles per hour (90 km/h), as well as low temperatures of −11 °F (−24 °C), hampered search, rescue, recovery, and investigation efforts. An Air Force helicopter was able to reach the crash site that afternoon, but was forced by the wind to take off shortly thereafter. The pilot, Major Norman Kahmoot, reported that there were no survivors, and that the aircraft had been so disfigured by the crash that it was no longer recognizable. Bodies had been scattered across a large area, and local Athabascan villagers volunteered to guard the remains from wolves until they could be collected and taken to the temporary morgue.

The NTSB investigation lasted 19 months, and it was discovered that a number of fatigue cracks had formed on the aircraft's wings due to improper and shoddy maintenance. The area over Pedro Bay had been the site of extreme, unreported turbulence, with winds in excess of 50 knots (93 km/h; 58 mph). The stresses due to turbulence and air pressure caused a structural failure in the aircraft's right wing, forcing it into a spiraling, uncontrollable dive.

== See also ==
- List of accidents and incidents involving airliners in the United States
