= Ivanovo Severny air base =

Military airport in Ivanovo, Russia

Ivanovo air base
- Ivanovo, Ivanovo Oblast in Russia
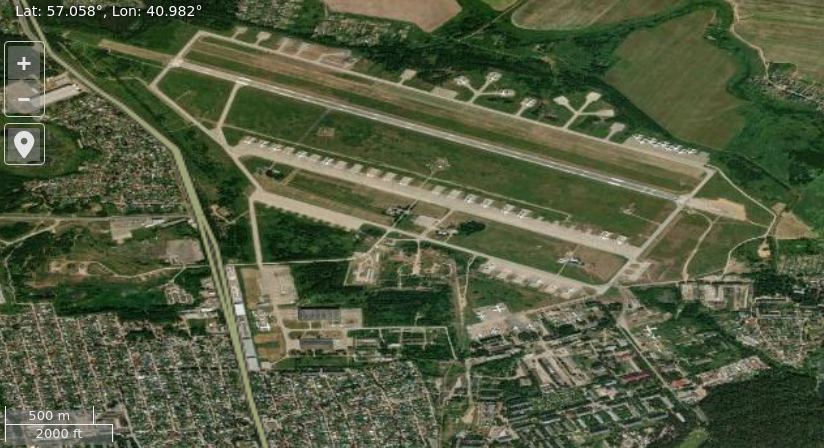
- Satellite imagery of Ivanovo Severny air base

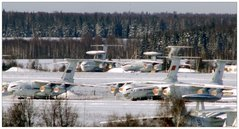

Site information
- Type: Air base
- Owner: Ministry of Defence
- Operator: Russian Aerospace Forces
- Controlled by: Military Transport Aviation

Location
- Shown within Ivanovo Oblast Ivanovo Severny (Russia)
- Coordinates: 57°3′30″N 40°58′54″E

Site history
- Built: 1935
- In use: 1935–present

Airfield information
- Elevation: 137 metres (449 ft) AMSL
Runways
Direction	Length and surface
11/29	2,300 metres (7,546 ft) Concrete

Ivanovo Severny (also Ivanovo air base and Ivanovo North) is an air base in Russia located 6 km north of Ivanovo. It is a large transport operation airfield with hangars and significant tarmac space. The runway was built in 1935 and upgraded in 1965. The airfield received the Soviet Union's first Ilyushin Il-76 delivery on June 3, 1974.

The base is home to the 144th Airborne Early Warning Aviation Regiment of the 12th Military Transport Aviation Division and the VTA training/development centre, the 610th Center for Combat Use and Retraining of Military Transport Aviation Flight Personnel (610th CBP i PLS) which uses the A-50 and A-50U airborne early warning and control aircraft.

== History ==
US intelligence summaries from 1957 showed 25 Tupolev Tu-4 (ASCC "Bull") bomber aircraft (Long Range Aviation) and 17 Lisunov Li-2 (ASCC "Cab") aircraft operated at Ivanovo Severny. The 27th Bomber Aviation Regiment was based here until the 1950s.

On the night of July 6, 1957, during landing, a Tu-4 bomber (commanded by A.I. Shcheglov) crashed into the forest near Strokino station and exploded. All 10 crew members were killed.

The 229th Military Transport Aviation Regiment arrived from Moscow-Lyubertsy in 1958, and was stationed here until May 1971, when it was absorbed by the 8th Military Transport Aviation Regiment.

Ivanovo Severny was home to the 81st Military Transport Aviation Regiment (81 VTAP) of Military Transport Aviation. It flew Ilyushin Il-76, Antonov An-12, and Antonov An-22 aircraft, and was disbanded in 1998. In May 1995 the 610th Centre was named in honor of Marshal of Aviation N.S. Skripko.

In the mid-1990s, there were several cuts to the Center. In spring 1998, after the disbandment of the 81st VTAP, the 144th Aviation Regiment flying Beriev A-50 (ASCC "Mainstay") airborne early warning aircraft was transferred to the Ivanovo-Severny airfield from Pechora. Later this unit became the 2457 Aviation Base of SDRLO (Long Range Detection). In 2009, the 2457th Base became part of the 610th TsBP i PLS. On September 1, 2010, the 610th TsBP i PLS, in turn, was subordinated to the 4th TsBP i PLS in Lipetsk.

Since 1996 the 308th Aviation Repair Plant (ARZ) at the base has mastered the repair of Antonov An-72 and An-74 aircraft, which originate in Ukraine. The 308 ARZ is now part of the United Aircraft Corporation. Since the end of 2001, the 308 ARZ has been reparing Yakovlev Yak-52 sports aircraft. Since 2005, the Yak-52 has been modernized into the Yak-52M variant.

In 2002–2007, the military-patriotic festival "Open Skies" was held at the airfield. In 2014, on the initiative of the commander of the Airborne Forces, Colonel General Vladimir Shamanov, this tradition was renewed.

On 1 June 2025, as part of Operation Spider's Web, Ukraine attacked Ivanovo Severny and three other air bases using swarms of short-range drones. The Ukrainian SBU claimed to have damaged an A-50 at the Ivanovo airbase. Extended footage confirmes that two A-50s were damaged.

== See also ==
- List of military airbases in Russia
