= Statesville Regional Airport =

Public airport in Statesville, North Carolina

- IATA: SVH; ICAO: KSVH; FAA LID: SVH

Summary
- Owner/Operator: City of Statesville
- Location: Statesville, North Carolina
- Opened: c. 1935
- Elevation AMSL: 967.8 ft / 295 m
- Coordinates: 35°45′54″N 80°57′14″W
- Website: https://www.statesvillenc.net/airport/
- Interactive map of Statesville Regional Airport

Runways
Direction	Length		Surface
Direction	ft	m	Surface
10/28	7,003	2,135	Asphalt

Statesville Regional Airport (IATA: SVH, ICAO: KSVH, FAA LID: SVH), formerly known as Statesville Municipal Airport, is a public, city-owned general aviation airport located 3 miles (5 km) southwest of downtown Statesville, a city in Iredell County, North Carolina.

In 2023, Statesville airport had 41,200 aircraft operations, with 76% being transient general aviation, 20% being local general aviation, 3% being air taxi services, and <1% being military activity.

== Services ==
Statesville airport features a single 7,003-foot asphalt runway and a parallel taxiway. It is also home to seventeen total aircraft hangars as well as two aircraft maintenance facilities for Cessna Citation and Dornier 328 jets.

Statesville Regional Airport is known for being home to several aircraft hangars owned by NASCAR teams. The crews of notable NASCAR drivers including Dale Earnhardt Sr., Dale Earnhardt Jr., Ryan Newman, Brad Keselowski, Greg Biffle, and Martin Truex Jr. have owned hangars at the airport.

The Lowe's company owns a 40,000-square foot hangar at Statesville that it built in 2004 after moving its headquarters from North Wilkesboro to Mooresville. The hangar is home to five Dassault Falcon jets and one Sikorsky helicopter.

== History ==
Statesville Regional Airport was opened around 1935 as a grass airstrip called Statesville Municipal Airport. The main runway was paved in the 1950s followed by the paving of another in the 1960s. The second runway was later repaved in 1999 to function as the taxiway. Dale Earnhardt Sr. was the first NASCAR driver to build a hangar at Statesville airport, where he operated a small private carrier called Champion Air to provide flights for him and his team on a fleet of three Embraer ERJ-145 ERs. In the early 2000s, the main runway was extended from 5,000 feet to 7,000 feet.

== Accidents and incidents ==
- December 18, 2025 – a Cessna Citation II crashed on approach while conducting an emergency landing killing all 7 onboard, including former NASCAR driver and owner of the aircraft, Greg Biffle.

== See also ==
- List of airports in North Carolina
