= Ivankovo, Ivanovsky District, Ivanovo Oblast =

Ivankovo Иванково
- Village
- Location within Ivanovo Oblast Location within Russia
- Coordinates: 57°10′N 40°49′E
- Country: Russia
- Region: Ivanovo Oblast
- District: Ivanovsky District
- Time zone: UTC+3:00

Ivankovo (Russian: Иванково) is a rural locality (a village) in Ivanovsky District, Ivanovo Oblast, Russia. Population: 33 (2010 census); 22 (2002 census);

== Geography ==
This rural locality is located 22 km from Ivanovo (the district's administrative centre and capital of Ivanovo Oblast) and 249 km from Moscow. Mikshino is the nearest rural locality.
