= List of companies of Honduras =

Location of Honduras

Honduras is a republic in Central America. It has at times been referred to as Spanish Honduras to differentiate it from British Honduras, which became modern-day Belize. Honduras spans about 112,492 km^{2} and has a population exceeding 8 million. Its northern portions are part of the Western Caribbean Zone, as reflected in the area's demographics and culture. Honduras is known for its rich natural resources, including minerals, coffee, tropical fruit, and sugar cane, as well as for its growing textiles industry, which serves the international market.

== Notable firms ==
This list includes notable companies with primary headquarters located in the country. The industry and sector follow the Industry Classification Benchmark taxonomy. Organizations which have ceased operations are included and noted as defunct.

Notable companies Status: P=Private, S=State; A=Active, D=Defunct
Name	Industry	Sector	Headquarters	Founded	Notes	Status	
AeroCaribe de Honduras	Consumer services	Airlines	San Pedro Sula	2009	Airline	P	A
AeroHonduras	Consumer services	Airlines	Tegucigalpa	2002	Airline, defunct 2005	P	D
Aerolíneas Sosa	Consumer services	Airlines	La Ceiba	1976	Airline	P	A
Atlantic Airlines	Consumer services	Airlines	La Ceiba	2001	Airline, defunct 2009	P	D
EasySky	Consumer services	Airlines	San Pedro Sula	2011	Airline	P	A
Empresa Nacional de Energía Eléctrica	Utilities	Conventional electricity	Tegucigalpa	1957	State electrical utility	S	A
Gasolineras Uno	Gas stations	Oil	Tegucigalpa		Gas stations	P	A
Hondutel	Telecommunications	Fixed line telecommunications	Tegucigalpa	1976	State telecom	S	A
InterAirports	Industrials	Transportation services	Tegucigalpa	2000	Airport administration	P	A
Isleña Airlines	Consumer services	Airlines	La Ceiba	1981	Airline	P	A
Lacthosa	Consumer goods	Food products	Tegucigalpa	1992	Food and beverage company	P	A
SAHSA	Consumer services	Airlines	Tegucigalpa	1945	Airline, defunct 1994	P	D
Tegu	Consumer goods	Toys	Tegucigalpa	2006	Toy company	P	A
