= Atlantic Airlines de Honduras =

Airline of Honduras

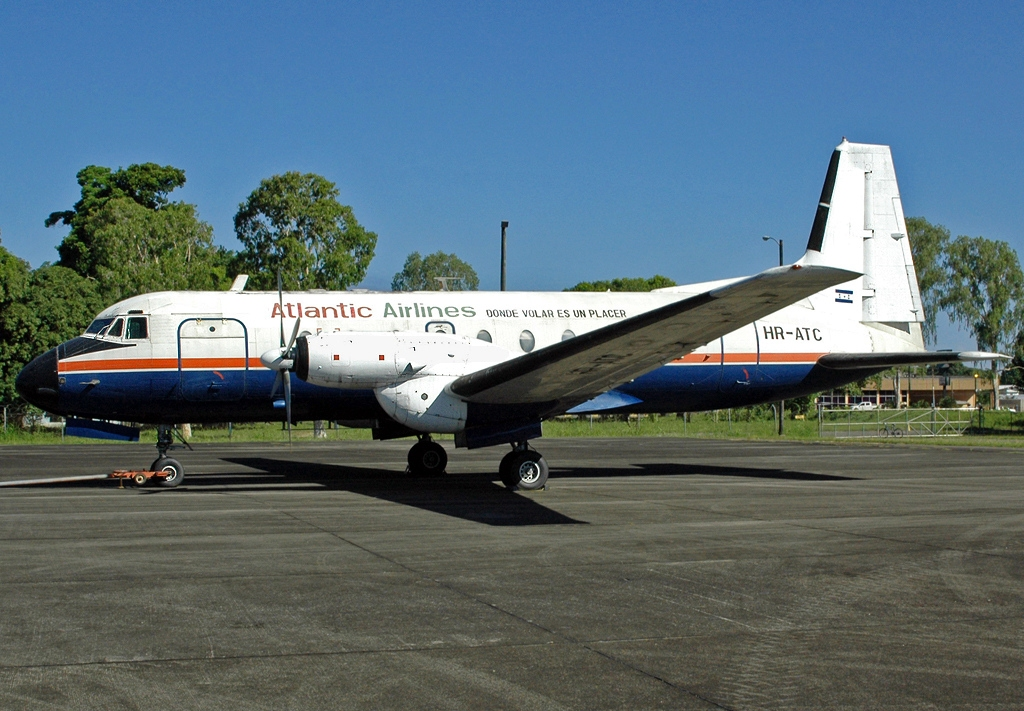
IATA	ICAO	Call sign
ZF	HHA	ATLANTIC HONDURAS
- Founded: 2001
- Ceased operations: 2009
- Operating bases: Golosón Int'l Airport; Toncontín Int'l Airport
- Headquarters: La Ceiba, Honduras
- Website: atlanticairlinesint.com (defunct)

Atlantic Airlines de Honduras was an airline based in La Ceiba, Honduras, which operated domestic and regional passenger flights, mostly out of the city's Golosón International Airport, as well as Toncontín International Airport (Tegucigalpa).

== History ==
The company was founded in 2001 by Atlantic Airlines, an airline from Nicaragua, using assets from Rollins Air. In October 2008, Atlantic Airlines de Honduras cancelled all flights and the bad safety reputation it had received following the crash of one of its Boeing 737-200 aircraft (registered YV102T) on 30 August of that year, killing the three persons on board. In 2009, the company was disestablished.

== Fleet ==
The Atlantic Airlines de Honduras fleet mainly consisted of up to six Boeing 737-200 aircraft, as well as twelve Let L-410 Turbolets. Additionally, at a time airliners of the types Fokker F27 Friendship, Fairchild Hiller FH-227 and Hawker Siddeley HS 748 were operated.

== Destinations ==
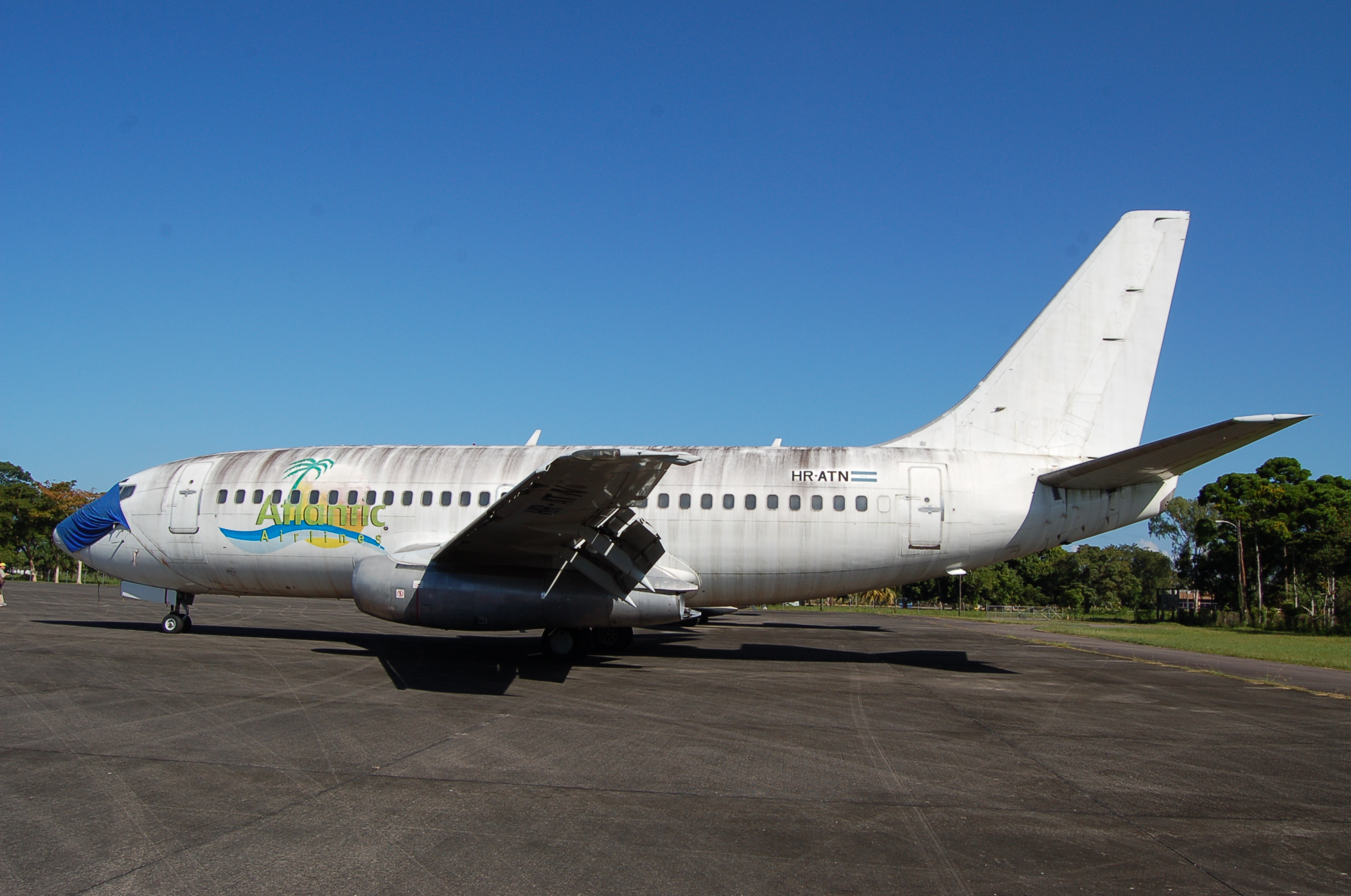
Boeing 737/2 of Atlantic Airlines (Honduras) at La Ceiba, Honduras 03/03/11.

Atlantic Airlines de Honduras offered scheduled flights to the following destinations:

Belize

- Belize City - Philip S. W. Goldson International Airport

Cayman Islands

- Grand Cayman - Owen Roberts International Airport

Honduras

- Guanaja - Guanaja Airport
- La Ceiba - Golosón International Airport (base)
- Puerto Lempira - Puerto Lempira Airport
- Roatán - Juan Manuel Gálvez International Airport
- San Pedro Sula - Ramón Villeda Morales International Airport
- Tegucigalpa - Toncontín International Airport (base)
- Útila - Útila Airport

Nicaragua

- Bluefields - Bluefields Airport
- Corn IslandsCorn Island Airport
- Managua - Augusto C. Sandino International Airport
- Puerto Cabezas - Puerto Cabezas Airport
