= List of airlines of Honduras =

This is a list of airlines currently operating in Honduras.

== Active ==
Airline	Image	IATA	ICAO	Callsign	Founded	Notes
AeroCaribe de Honduras		HAS	HONDURAS AIR		2009	
Aerolíneas Sosa	S0	NSO	SOSA		1976	
Avianca Honduras	WC	ISV	ISLEÑA		2013	Currently dormant
Aviatsa		VVT			2015	
CM Airlines	CC	OMT	CMAIR		2007	

== Defunct ==
Airline	Image	IATA	ICAO	Callsign	Founded	Ceased operations	Notes
Aero Servicios					1957	1993	
AeroHonduras		4S	HON	AEROHONDURAS	2004	2005	
Aerolínea Lanhsa			LNH		2011	2025	
Aerovias Nacionales de Honduras				ANHSA	1950	1989	
Atlantic Airlines de Honduras		ZF	HHA	ATLANTIC HONDURAS	2001	2009	
Blue Air Sea International Cargo					1986	1987	Renamed to Servicios Aéreos Generales
Caribbean Air		9G	CRB		1995	1998	
Central American Airways			CRW	CENTRAL AMERICAN	2008	2011	Purchased by EasySky
Compañía Aérea Hondureña					1927	1932	Owned by the United Fruit Company
EasySky			EKY		2011	2020	
Hondu Carib Cargo						1983	Renamed/merged to Great Southern Airways
Honduras International					1961	1962	
Isleña Airlines		WC	ISV	ISLEÑA	1981	2013	Rebranded as Avianca Honduras
LANSA		UL	ULD		1967	1979	
Lineas Aéreas Nacionales de Honduras					2001	2001	
Rollins Air			RAV	ROLLINS	1995	2014	
SAHSA		SH	SHA	SAHSA	1945	1994	Went bankrupt
Servicios Aéreos Generales					1987	1989	
Sol Air		4S	HON		2002	2004	Rebranded as AeroHonduras
SETCO					1981	2006	
TACA de Honduras					1933	1953	
Transportes Aéreos Nacionales		TX	TAN	TAN	1945	1991	Merged with SAHSA

== See also ==
- List of airlines of the Americas
- List of defunct airlines of the Americas
