= Atlantic Airlines =

Atlantic Airlines may refer to:

- Atlantic Airlines de Honduras, a defunct airline based in Tegucigalpa, Honduras
- Atlantic Airlines (Nicaragua), a defunct airline based in Managua, Nicaragua
- Atlantic Airlines (United Kingdom), an airline based in Coventry, United Kingdom
- Atlantic Airlines (Gambia)
- Atlantic Air, a defunct airline also known as Business Express Airlines

== See also ==
- Atlantic Airways
- Air Atlantic
- Atlantic Southeast Airlines
