= Avianca Honduras =

Honduran domestic airline

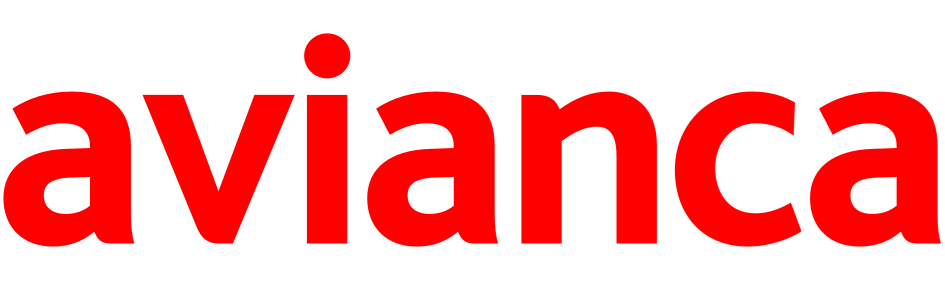
IATA	ICAO	Call sign
WC	ISV	ISLEÑA
- Founded: 1981 (as Isleña Airlines)
- Commenced operations: May 31, 1981
- Hubs: Ramón Villeda Morales International Airport
- Frequent-flyer program: LifeMiles
- Alliance: Star Alliance (affiliate)
- Parent company: Avianca Group
- Headquarters: San Pedro Sula, Honduras
- Key people: Frederico Pedreira (CEO)
- Founder: Arturo Alvarado Wood
- Website: www.avianca.com

Isleña de Inversiones S.A. de C.V. branded Avianca Honduras is a regional airline based in San Pedro Sula, Honduras. It offered mostly scheduled and chartered passenger flights out of its hub at Ramón Villeda Morales International Airport. It was formerly one of the airlines part of Grupo TACA. It is one of the seven nationally branded airlines (Avianca Costa Rica, Avianca Ecuador, etc.) in the Avianca Group of Latin American airlines.

== History ==
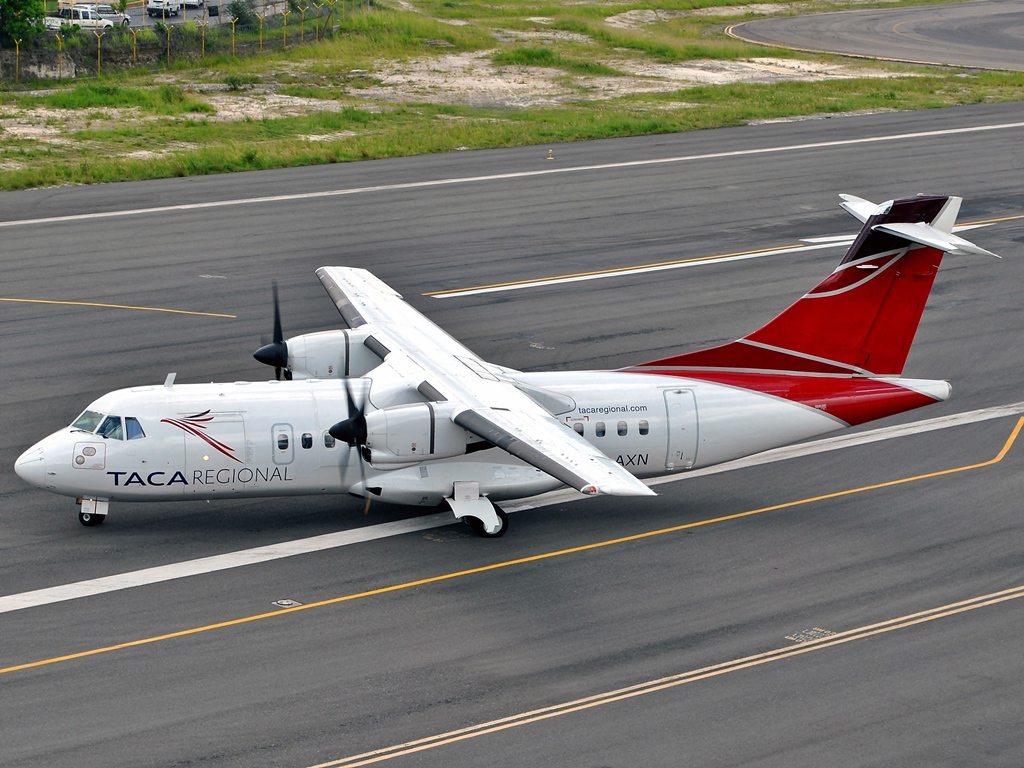
An Isleña Airlines ATR 42-320, operated by TACA Regional, at Toncontín International Airport in 2012

The airline was founded as Isleña Airlines in 1981 by Arturo Alvarado Wood in the city of La Ceiba. It began operations on May 31, 1981, with a Cessna 206 between La Ceiba and Roatán. Their central office was formerly located in La Ceiba and its hub was at Golosón International Airport.

In 1998, Grupo TACA acquired a 20% stake in the company, and began operating under the TACA Regional banner. On May 28, 2013, Isleña was unified with the rest of TACA's subsidiaries into the Avianca Holdings, being renamed Avianca Honduras.

By October 2018, Avianca Honduras had suspended its routes until further notice. In March 2020, the airline retired is remaining aircraft and transferred its operations to Avianca.

On May 10, 2020, Avianca filed for Chapter 11 bankruptcy in the United States after failing to pay bondholders, becoming one of the major airlines to file for bankruptcy due to the COVID-19 pandemic crisis.

== Destinations ==
Prior to March 2020, Avianca Honduras operated to the following destinations:

Country	City	Airport	Notes	Refs
Guatemala	Guatemala City	La Aurora International Airport	Terminated	
Honduras	Guanaja	Guanaja Airport	Terminated	
Honduras	La Ceiba	Golosón International Airport	Terminated	
Honduras	Roatán	Juan Manuel Gálvez International Airport	Terminated	
Honduras	San Pedro Sula	Ramón Villeda Morales International Airport	Hub; Suspended	
Honduras	Tegucigalpa	Toncontín International Airport	Terminated	
Honduras	Utila	Útila Airport	Terminated	

Further destinations were served by chartered flights.

== Fleet ==
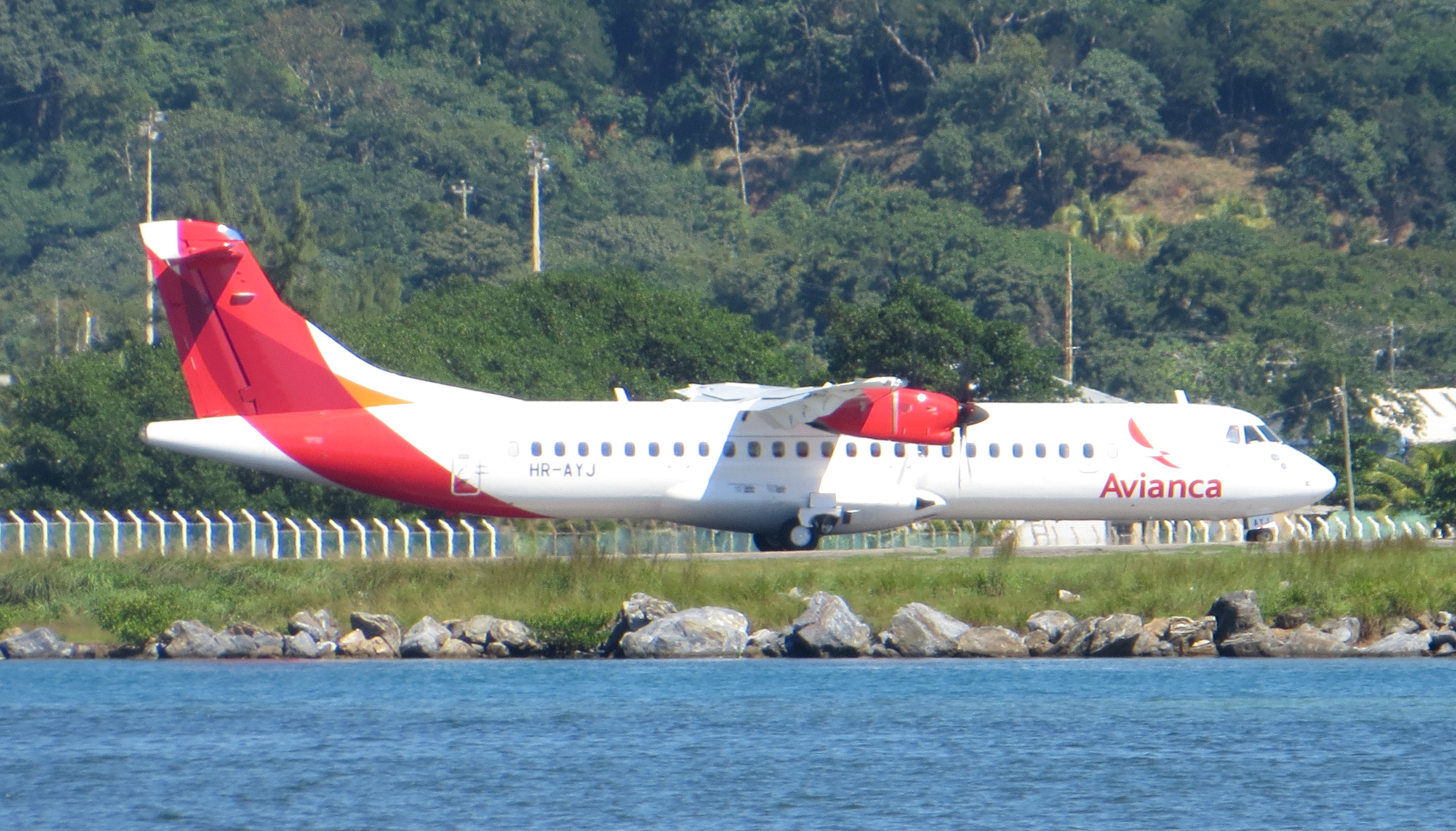
A former Avianca Honduras ATR 72-600 taxiing at Juan Manuel Gálvez International Airport in 2014

Throughout its existence as Isleña Airlines, the airline operated the following aircraft:

- 7 ATR 42-300
- 6 ATR 42-320
- 2 ATR 72-600
- 1 Beechcraft 90
- 1 Beechcraft 99
- 1 Boeing 737-200
- 1 Cessna 206
- 3 de Havilland Canada DHC-6-200 Twin Otter
- 5 Embraer EMB 110 Bandeirante
- 3 Fokker F27 Friendship
- 1 Fairchild Hiller FH-227
- 1 Grumman Gulfstream I
- 3 Short 360
- 4 Let L-410 Turbolet

== Accidents and incidents ==
- On April 4, 1990, a de Havilland Canada DHC-6-200 Twin Otter (registered HR-ALH) landed in the water short off the runway at Útila Airport, following a scheduled passenger flight from La Ceiba with 18 passengers on board. The two pilots claimed to have been blinded by the sun, thus misjudging the remaining distance to the runway. All occupants of the aircraft could be saved.
- On March 3, 1997, a Let L-410 Turbolet (registered HR-IAS) did not gain sufficient height upon take-off from Golosón International Airport for a scheduled flight to Puerto Lempira with 19 passengers on board. Following the retraction of the landing gear, the two pilots had applied the wrong engine power setup and were forced to bring the aircraft down again in a belly landing, during which it was damaged beyond repair.

== See also ==
- List of airlines of Honduras
