= AeroCaribe de Honduras =

Honduran airline

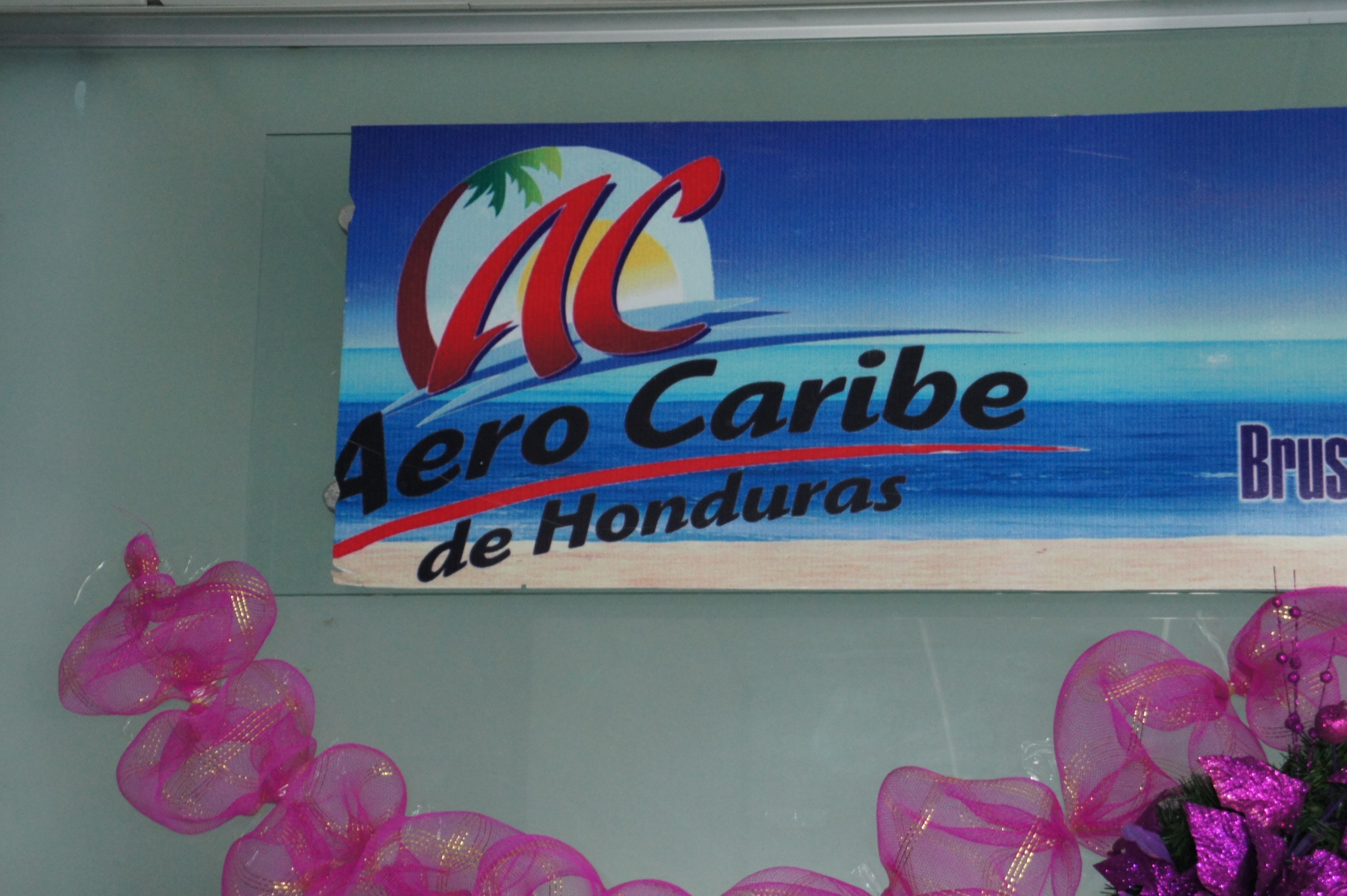
IATA	ICAO	Call sign
-	HAS	HONDURAS AIR
- Founded: 2009
- Hubs: Golosón International Airport
- Headquarters: La Ceiba, Honduras

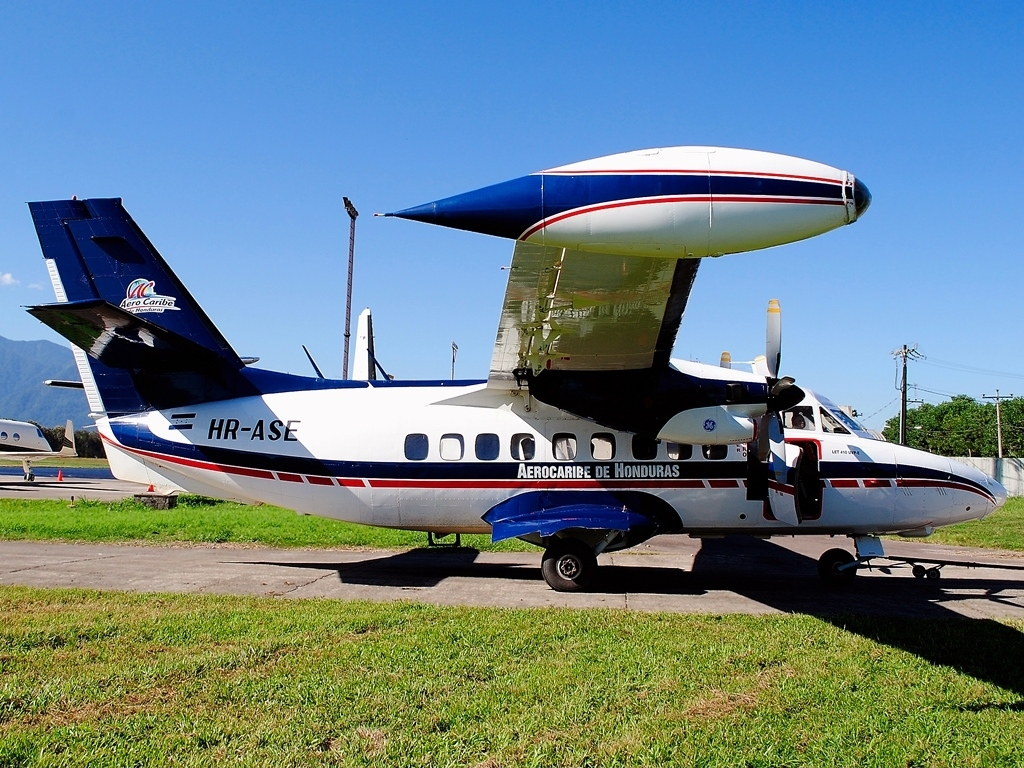
AeroCaribe de Honduras Let L-410 at Golosón International Airport in 2013

AeroCaribe de Honduras is a charter airline in Honduras. It operates one Let L-410 UVPE and one Cessna 206.

== Destinations ==
- Guanaja's Guanaja Airport
- La Ceiba's Golosón International Airport Hub
- Puerto Lempira's Puerto Lempira Airport

== See also ==
- List of airlines of Honduras
