= UII =

UII may refer to:

- Unione Induista Italia, a Hindu association in Italy
- Islamic University of Indonesia (Universitas Islam Indonesia)
- Unique Ingredient Identifier
- Unique Item Identifier; see Item Unique Identification
- Útila Airport, serving Útila, Bay Islands, Honduras
