= InterAirports =

InterAirports is a subsidiary of Grupo Terra; company who administed four honduran international airports from 2000 to 2020, as a part of a twenty-year concession agreement.

- La Ceiba – Golosón International Airport
- Roatán – Juan Manuel Gálvez International Airport
- San Pedro Sula – Ramón Villeda Morales International Airport
- Tegucigalpa – Toncontín International Airport

== See also ==
- List of airports in Honduras
