= SAHSA =

National airline of Honduras, 1945–1994

Servicio Aéreo de Honduras (SAHSA)
IATA	ICAO	Call sign
SH	SHA	SAHSA
- Founded: 1945
- Ceased operations: 1994
- Hubs: Toncontín International Airport
- Secondary hubs: Ramón Villeda Morales International Airport
- Focus cities: Tegucigalpa, San Pedro Sula, Managua, New Orleans
- Alliance: Tan-Sahsa
- Fleet size: 32
- Destinations: 40 destinations: Central America, North America, South America & the Caribbean
- Parent company: Pan American Airways
- Headquarters: Tegucigalpa, Honduras
- Key people: Oswaldo López Arellano

Servicio Aéreo de Honduras S.A. (IATA: SH, ICAO: SHA), otherwise known as SAHSA Airlines, was the national flag carrier airline of Honduras from October 22, 1945, to January 14, 1994. The airline was a subsidiary of Pan American Airways and merged with Transportes Aéreos Nacionales (TAN) to form TAN-SAHSA in November 1991.

== History ==
Sahsa Airlines pilots

SAHSA was founded on January 2, 1945, with help from Pan American Airways under the name Servicio Aéreo de Honduras S.A. (SAHSA). Pan American Airways owned 40%, the Honduran government owned 40% and 20% was owned by private investors.

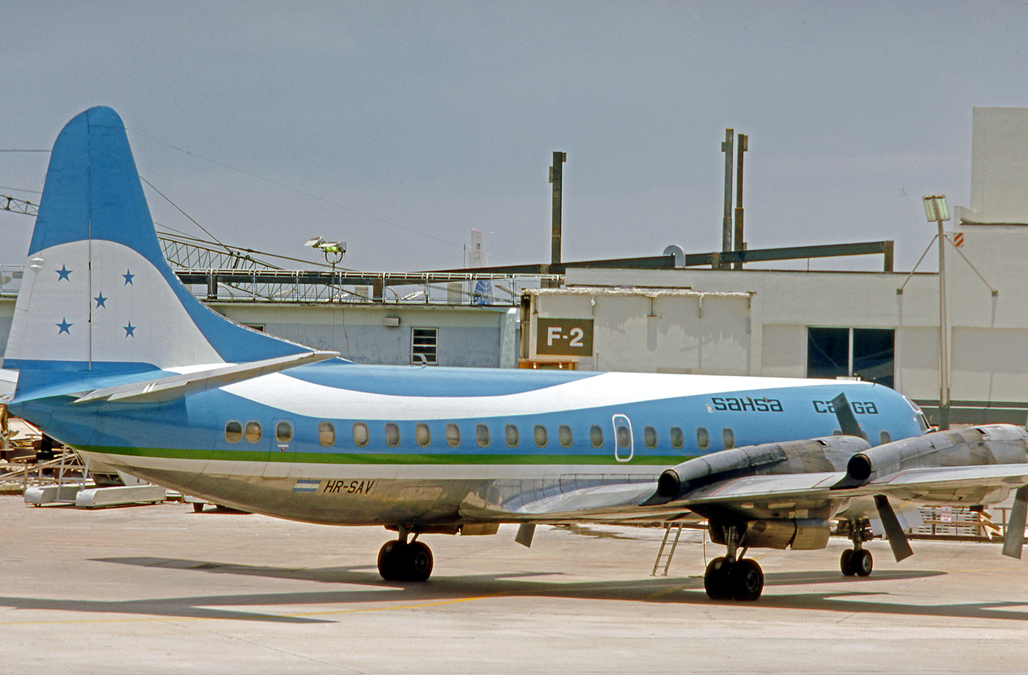
SAHSA Lockheed L-188 Electra combi aircraft operating a mixed passenger-freight schedule at Miami International Airport in July 1976

The airline began operations on October 22, 1945, using a Douglas DC-2 (XH-SAA) to fly to destinations within Honduras. By October 1945, SAHSA had also acquired a Douglas DC-3 and a Beechcraft Model 18. In 1953, SAHSA acquired rival airline TACA de Honduras, by which time SAHSA was operating the Douglas DC-2, Douglas DC-3, and Curtis C-46 Commando.

Equipment with modern pressurised airliners began in the mid-1960s with the Convair 340, Convair 440 and Douglas DC-6B being added to the fleet. The turboprop Lockheed L-188 Electra joined the company in 1969.

In 1970, Pan Am gave up its stake in SAHSA and TAN took over, but SAHSA continued to operate independently. TAN acquired the first jet airliner in Honduras, a Boeing 737-200, in 1974, and started international operations between Miami and Honduras. SAHSA acquired a Boeing 737-200 in October 1974 and later acquired Boeing 727-200s. SAHSA began operations between Costa Rica, Nicaragua, Belize and New Orleans.

The owner of TAN-SAHSA, Oswaldo López Arellano, was a two-term president of Honduras. To keep business in Honduras, no U.S. airlines were given permission fly to or from Honduras. Once Arellano was thrown out of power, several U.S. based airlines, such as Eastern Airlines, Pan Am and Air Florida, were allowed to operate to and from Honduras.

SAHSA and TAN merged into TAN-SAHSA on 1 November 1991. It was based at Toncontín International Airport in Tegucigalpa and flew from Honduras to various destinations throughout Central and North and South America. The TAN-SAHSA name was used between 1990 and 1991 when the name TAN disappeared. The airline continued to operate as SAHSA until its demise in 1994. The collapse was partly due to corruption and partly to the airline's poor safety record.

The airline experienced several accidents during its operational life, including a major crash of a 727 in 1989 in Honduras, killing 131 of 146 passengers aboard. Four years the airline had back to back incidents in two consecutive months in July and August of 1993. In the first, a 737 was seriously damaged in a hard landing in Managua, Nicaragua. Another incident then occurred the following month in August of 1993 when a Houston-bound 737 plane began to lose hydraulic fluid in flight requiring an emergency landing in San Pedro Sula, Honduras. Due to the skillful actions of the pilots none of the passengers or crew were injured. A mechanic and parts were flown in from the capital and the aircraft was repaired on the tarmac that day, with the passengers reboarded and then continued the flight arriving in Houston that evening some 6 hours late. After this incident the airline lost its FAA Air Operations Certificate and with it its operating privileges to the United States. No longer able to fly to the United States, financial pressures caused the airline to cease flight operations in late 1993 and it was disbanded in January 1994. Following the collapse of SAHSA, Honduras had no national airline until 2002, when Sol Air commenced operations.

== Destinations ==
SAHSA was initially established as a national airline to operate domestic flights with aircraft such as the Douglas DC-2 and Douglas DC-3. Initial routes were limited to Tegucigalpa, San Pedro Sula, Puerto Cortés, La Ceiba, Marcala, Intibucá, Santa Rosa de Copán, Ocotepeque and Santa Bárbara.

The first U.S. route operated by SAHSA was to New Orleans in 1974 with Lockheed L-188 Electra propjet service being flown on a daily route of New Orleans-Belize-San Pedro Sula-Tegucigalpa with continuing service three days a week being operated to San Jose, Costa Rica by this Electra flight.

Following the acquisition of Boeing jet aircraft in the mid 1970s, the airline expanded its international routes. In addition to New Orleans, Belize, Guatemala City and San Jose, CR, new destinations included Houston, Miami, Grand Cayman, Managua, Guatemala City, San Salvador, Panama, Colombia and Peru.

=== Known destinations ===
Domestic

- Comayagua – Comayagua Airport
- Erandique – Erandique Airport
- Gracias – Gracias Airport
- La Ceiba – Golosón International Airport
- La Esperanza – La Esperanza Airport (Intibucá)
- Marcala – Marcala Airport
- Ocotepeque – Ocotepeque Airport
- Puerto Cortes – Puerto Cortes Airport
- Roatan – Juan Manuel Gálvez International Airport
- San Esteban - San Esteban Airport
- Santa Bárbara – Santa Bárbara Airport
- San Pedro Sula – Ramón Villeda Morales International Airport – Secondary Hub
- Santa Rosa de Copán – Santa Rosa de Copán Airport
- Tegucigalpa – Toncontín International Airport – Hub

=== International ===
Belize

- Belize City – Philip S. W. Goldson International Airport

Cayman Islands

- Grand Cayman - Owen Roberts International Airport

Colombia

- Bogotá – El Dorado International Airport
- San Andrés – Gustavo Rojas Pinilla International Airport

Costa Rica

- San José – Juan Santamaría International Airport

El Salvador

- San Salvador - El Salvador International Airport

Guatemala

- Guatemala City – La Aurora International Airport

Nicaragua

- Managua – Augusto C. Sandino International Airport

Panama

- Panama City – Tocumen International Airport

Peru

- Lima - Jorge Chávez International Airport

United States

- Houston – George Bush Intercontinental Airport
- Miami – Miami International Airport
- New Orleans – Louis Armstrong New Orleans International Airport

== Fleet ==
SAHSA's fleet consisted of the following aircraft:

Aircraft	Total	Routes
Boeing 727-100	2	short and medium haul
Boeing 727-200	1	short and medium haul
Boeing 737-200	10	short and medium haul
Boeing 737-400	2	medium haul
CV-340	3	short haul
CV-440	3	short haul
CV-580	3	short haul
Douglas DC-3	6	short haul
Lockheed L-188 Electra	2	short and medium haul

=== Previously operated ===
The airline also operated:

- Douglas DC-2
- Douglas DC-6
- Curtiss C-46 Commando

== Accidents and incidents ==
Sahsa Airlines was involved in several incidents and accidents, the most notable being:

- On 7 June 1962, a SAHSA Curtiss C-46 Commando (HR-SAL); a cargo flight, crash landed at Toncontin when the left side undercarriage strut collapsed on touchdown. Both crew members survived but the aircraft was damaged beyond repair.
- On 20 February 1967, SAHSA Flight 203, a Douglas DC-6 (HR-SAS) had an accident at Toncontin International Airport because of a reverse prop system failure, during forced braking two main gear tires caught fire, the plane overran the runway and caught fire killing 4 passengers.
- On 13 September 1969, a SAHSA Douglas DC-3 was hijacked at Comalapa International Airport. The hijacking lasted less than one day and there were no fatalities.
- On 25 November 1969, a SAHSA Douglas DC-3 (HR-ANA) crashed whilst attempting to land on runway 01 at Toncontin. Strong gusts of wind upset the aircraft attitude during its flare which pushed the aircraft towards the terminal buildings. The crew forced a turn away from the buildings and crashed. All 15 passengers and 3 crew survived.
- On 28 May 1980, a SAHSA Douglas DC-3 (HR-SAC) was damaged beyond repair when part of its landing gear struck a wall whilst on approach to Utila Airport in Honduras.
- On 8 January 1981, a Lockheed L-188 Electra (HR-SAW) crashed at Guatemala City whilst on a ferry flight to Tegucigalpa for repairs, the plane took off with only three engines and one of the electrical generators malfunctioning, shortly after take off the plane lost hydraulic pressure and tried return to La Aurora International Airport, but the plane lost altitude and crashed into some houses 1 mile west of the airport, killing the 6 crew members on board.
- On 27 March 1981, a SAHSA Boeing 737-200 was hijacked in Panama by terrorists demanding the release of prisoners. The hijackers surrendered after 2 days. There were no fatalities.
- On 21 October 1989, Tan-Sahsa Flight 414 a Boeing 727-200 (N88705) crashed at the "Cerro de Hula" mountain ridge after an unsuccessful approach, killing 131 people.
- On 18 March 1990, a SAHSA Douglas DC-3 (HR-SAZ) overran the runway on landing at Juan Manuel Gálvez International Airport, Roatán and ended up in the sea. The aircraft, performing a domestic scheduled passenger flight, was damaged beyond repair but all 32 people on board escaped.
- On 17 November 1991, a SAHSA Boeing 737-200 landed hard on the right main gear strut at Juan Santamaria International Airport casing the right landing gear strut to collapse. All 36 passengers and 6 crew escaped.
- On 18 July 1993, a SAHSA Boeing 737-200 was damaged beyond repair during a hard landing at Managua Airport in Nicaragua the aircraft skidded to the right, off the runway. The nosegear collapsed and both engines were torn off. The aircraft came to rest 200 feet right of the runway.

== Bibliography ==
- Sherlock, Jay. L (1977). Lockheed L-188 Electra and Orion. Air-Britain (Historians) Ltd. ISBN 0-85130-058-8.
