= AeroHonduras =

Airline of Honduras

IATA	ICAO	Call sign
4S	HON	AEROHONDURAS
- Founded: January 2002 (as Sol Air)
- Commenced operations: July 12, 2002
- Ceased operations: August 5, 2005
- Hubs: Toncontin International Airport
- Secondary hubs: Juan Manuel Galvez International Airport
- Focus cities: Augusto C. Sandino International Airport; Miami International Airport
- Alliance: Aeropostal Alas de Venezuela
- Fleet size: 1
- Destinations: 6
- Headquarters: Tegucigalpa, Honduras
- Key people: Ricardo Martinez (President)
- Website: www.aerohonduras.com

AeroHonduras S.A./C.V. was an airline based at Toncontín International Airport in Tegucigalpa, Honduras. It operated scheduled flights within Central America and the United States.

== History ==
Originally established as Sol Air in January 2002, the airline leased a Boeing 727-200 from Falcon Air Express and started operations on July 12 of that year. In July 2004, the Venezuelan state-owned airline Aeropostal acquired a 45% stake in the company and rebranded it as AeroHonduras; the airline's President, Ricardo Martinez, retained the remaining 55% stake.

On August 5, 2005, AeroHonduras suspended operations after its only operating Boeing 737-300 leased from Falcon Air Express and was taken back by the company. Although the airline initially indicated that it was a temporary move, there had been issues with financial payment for services, delays associated with repairs and financial mismanagement associated with its suspension of service.

== Destinations ==
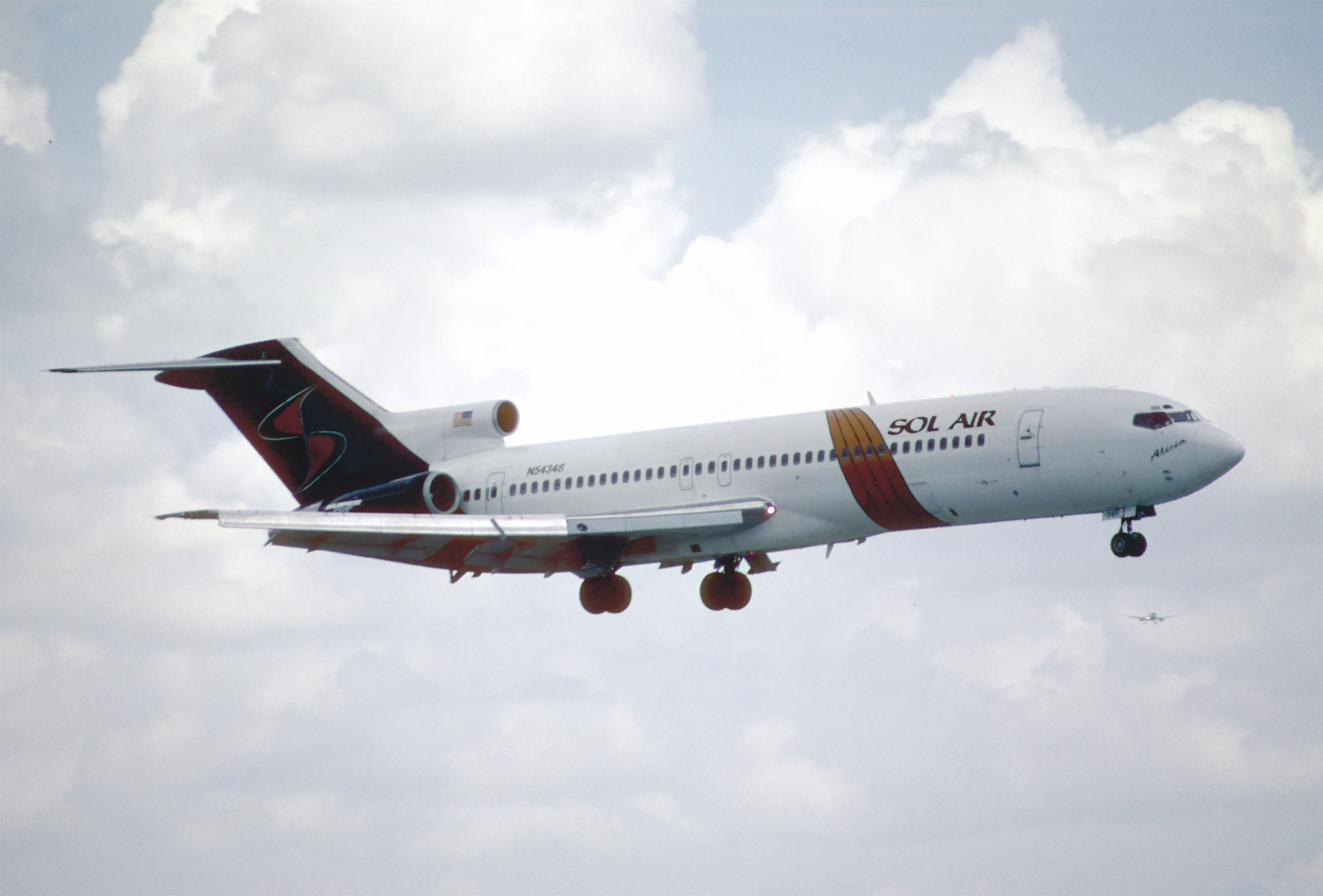
A Sol Air Boeing 727-200 (leased) on approach to Miami International Airport in 2003

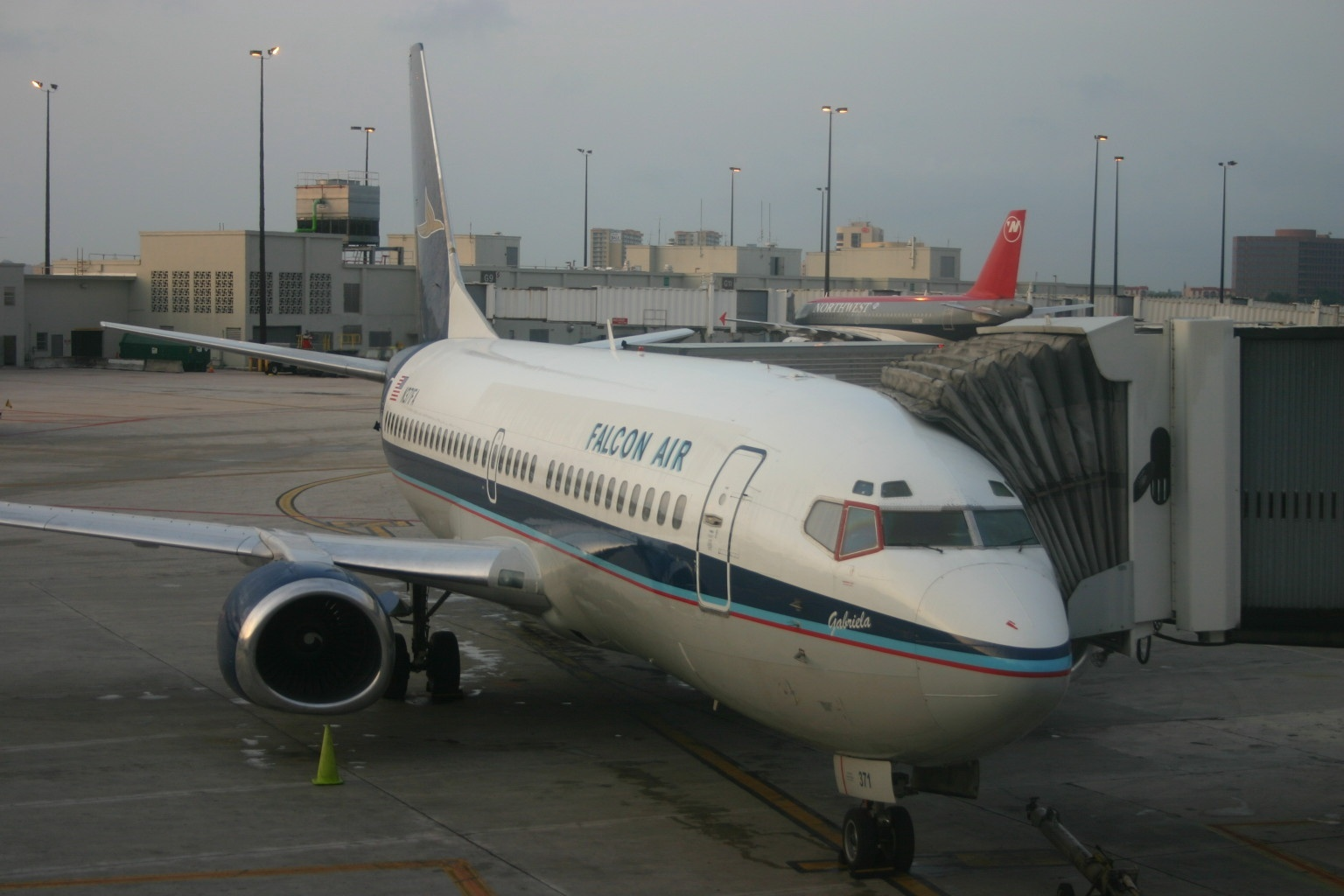
An AeroHonduras Boeing 737-300 (leased) on the terminal at Miami International Airport in 2005

AeroHonduras operated flights to the following cities:

Country	City	Airport	Notes
Guatemala	Guatemala City	La Aurora International Airport	
Honduras	Roatán	Juan Manuel Galvez International Airport	Hub
Honduras	San Pedro Sula	Ramón Villeda Morales International Airport	
Honduras	Tegucigalpa	Toncontin International Airport	Hub
Nicaragua	Managua	Augusto C. Sandino International Airport	Focus city
United States	Miami	Miami International Airport	Focus city

== Fleet ==
AeroHonduras operated the following aircraft:

AeroHonduras retired fleet
Aircraft	Total	Introduced	Retired	Notes
Boeing 727-200	2	2002	2004	Leased from Falcon Air Express
Boeing 737-300	1	2002	2004	Leased from Falcon Air Express
Boeing 737-300	1	2005	2005	Leased from Falcon Air Express
Boeing 737-300	1	2002	2003	

== See also ==
- List of defunct airlines of Honduras
