= Útila Airport =

Airport in Honduras

- IATA: UII; ICAO: MHUT

Summary
- Airport type: Public
- Operator: State government
- Serves: Útila
- Location: Islas de la Bahía, Honduras
- Elevation AMSL: 29 ft / 9 m
- Coordinates: 16°06′45″N 86°52′50″W
- Website: www.aboututila.com

Map
- Location of the airport in Honduras

Runways
Direction	Length		Surface
Direction	m	ft	Surface
07/25	1,300	4,265	Asphalt
- Source: Google Maps GCM

Útila Airport (IATA: UII, ICAO: MHUT) is an airport serving Útila, Islas de la Bahía, Honduras. It handles regional and international air traffic for the town of Útila. The airport is served by two airlines on a daily schedule, as well as numerous private and charter flights.

Útila island is 36 kilometres (22 mi) offshore from the city of La Ceiba. The airport is 1.6 kilometres (1 mi) northeast of Útila town. Northeast approach and departure are over the water.

The Utila VOR-DME (ident: UTI) is 600 metres (2,000 ft) south of the runway. The Bonito VOR-DME (Ident: BTO) is located on the mainland 22.6 nautical miles (41.9 km) south of the airport.

== Airlines and destinations ==
Airlines	Destinations
Aerolineas Sosa	La Ceiba
CM Airlines	La Ceiba, Roatán, San Pedro Sula

== Incidents and accidents ==
- On 10 May 2009, a BAe Jetstream 32 on an illegal flight ran out of fuel and crashed short of the runway, killing one of the three occupants.
- On 4 April 1990, an Isleña Airlines De Havilland DHC-6 Twin Otter crashed into water 175 feet short of the runway threshold. There were minor injuries among the twenty passengers and crew. The crew were reportedly blinded by sunlight during the approach.
- On 28 May 1980, a SAHSA Douglas C-47 suffered substantial damage after the extended gear hit a wall during approach, causing the aircraft to impact terrain.

== See also ==
- Transport in Honduras
- List of airports in Honduras
