= Rollins Air =

Honduras airline

IATA	ICAO	Call sign
-	RAV	ROLLINS
- Founded: 1995
- Commenced operations: 1997
- Ceased operations: 2014
- Hubs: Toncontín International Airport
- Website: rollinsair.com

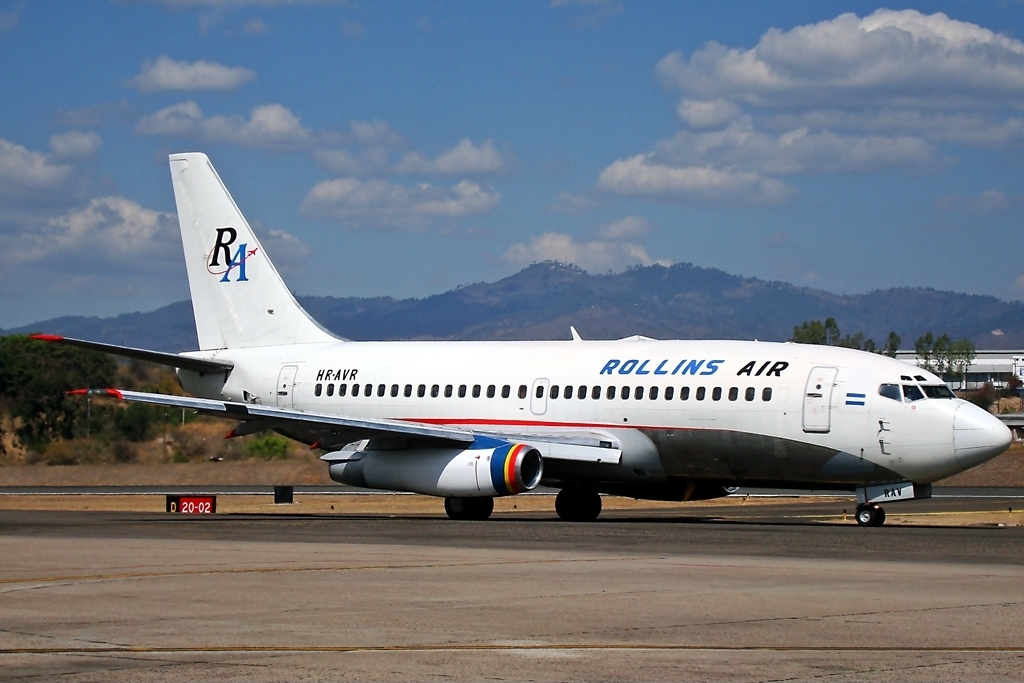
Rollins air 737-200

Rollins Air was a charter airline based in Honduras. It had Lockheed Tristars and Boeing 737s. In 2011 it was banned from operating in the European Union due to safety concerns. On 24 September 2012, its air Operator's Certificate was revoked and it subsequently expired. On 4 December 2012 (after the AOC expired) the airline was removed from EU list of banned air carriers.

Their charter flights were flying to Europe and Africa, and were used for pilgrimage to Mecca.

== Accidents and incidents ==
- On 24 November 1997, a GAF Nomad N.24A was damaged beyond repair on landing, but no one was killed.

== See also ==
- List of defunct airlines of Honduras
