= EasySky =

Honduran low-cost airline

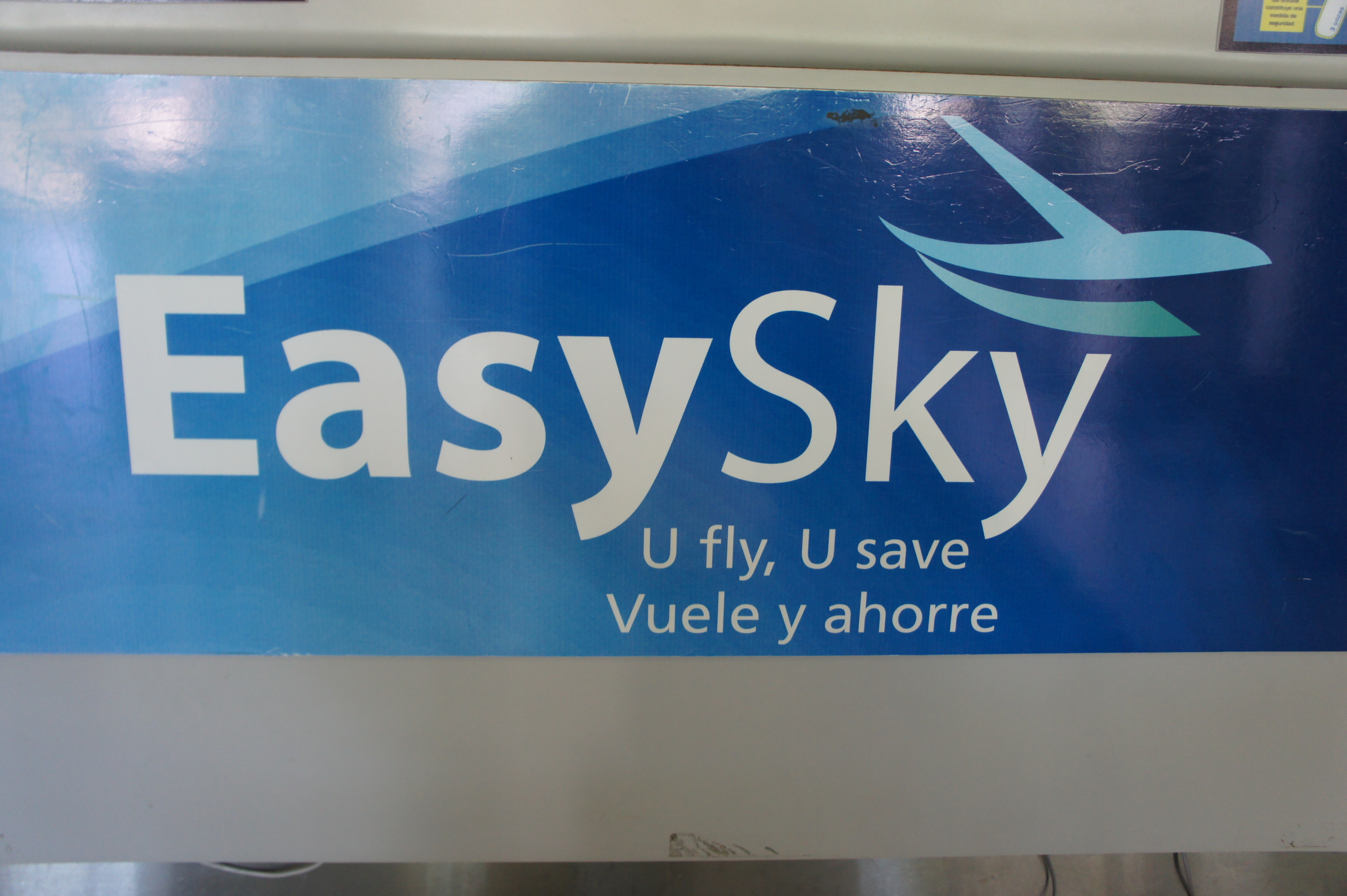
IATA	ICAO	Call sign
—	EKY	—
- Founded: 2011
- Ceased operations: 2020
- Fleet size: 5
- Destinations: 12
- Headquarters: Tegucigalpa, Honduras
- Website: easysky.hn

EasySky was a low-cost airline based in Honduras. Its head office is located in Tegucigalpa, and since 2015, its primary operational base was at Toncontín International Airport in Tegucigalpa.

== Destinations ==
EasySky flew to the following scheduled and charter destinations:

- Juan Manuel Gálvez International Airport
- Toncontín International Airport
- José Martí International Airport
- Maurice Bishop International Airport
- Hewanorra International Airport
- Cancún International Airport
- Toluca International Airport
- Tocumen International Airport
- Cheddi Jagan International Airport
- Simón Bolívar International Airport
- Arturo Michelena International Airport
- Argyle International Airport

== Fleet ==
=== Fleet before closure ===
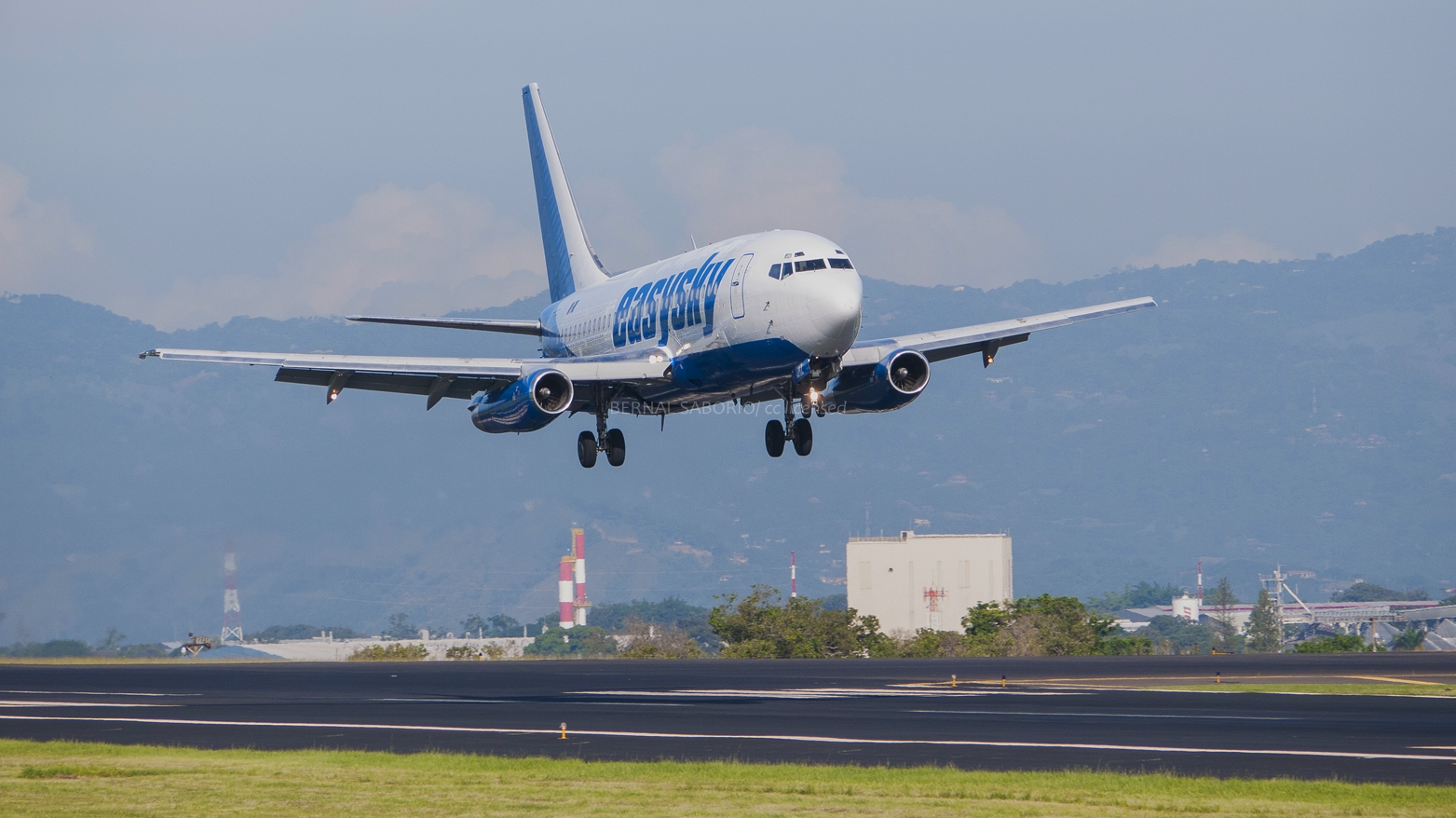
Global Air Boeing B737-200. Operated by Easy Sky (Honduras)

As of August 2017 EasySky operated the following aircraft:

EasySky Fleet
Aircraft	In service	Orders	Passengers	Notes
Boeing 737-200	2	—		
Boeing 737-500	2	—		
Total	5	—		

=== Former fleet ===
The airline previously operated the following aircraft:

- 3 further Boeing 737
- 2 Bae Jetstream 31

== Incidents and accidents ==
On December 31, 2012, one of EasySky's planes veered off the runway while landing in San Pedro Sula and landed in a ditch. There were no fatalities and only one person was hurt.

EasySky and its parent Global Air were linked to the tragedy of Cubana de Aviación Flight 972 which happened on May 18, 2018, in which 112 people died, through the use of a Boeing 737-200 in a wet lease service to serve regional flights to Cubana de Aviación.

== Legal Action ==
In 2018 easyGroup, licensor of the easyJet brand began legal proceedings against EasySky and Colombia-based EasyFly over use of the "easy" prefix.
