= Tegu (toy company) =

- Trade name: Tegu
- Type: Private
- Industry: Manufacturing
- Founded: 2006
- Founder: Chris Haughey; Will Haughey
- Headquarters: Rowayton, Connecticut, United States and Tegucigalpa, Honduras
- Area served: Worldwide
- Key people: Chris Haughey, Will Haughey (Founders)
- Products: Magnetic wooden toy blocks
- Revenue: $8 Million (2019)
- Website: www.tegu.com

Tegu is a toy company based in Honduras and the United States that sells magnetic wooden toy blocks. The company was founded in 2006 by Chris Haughey and Will Haughey. The company aims to help Honduras through positive employment opportunities, tree-planting efforts, and by funding days of school.

Founders	Chris Haughey, Will Haughey
Type	Magnetic Wooden Toy Company
Founded	2006
Headquarters	Rowayton, Connecticut, United States and Tegucigalpa, Honduras
Website	www.tegu.com
Revenue	$8 Million (2019)

== Business overview ==
Co-founders and brothers Chris Haughey and Will Haughey were born in New Zealand and moved to St. Louis, Missouri, at a young age. Both attended the John Burroughs Preparatory Day School in St. Louis, Missouri. The Haughey family took numerous mission trips to underdeveloped nations.

After graduating from Stanford with a degree in mechanical engineering in 2002, Chris Haughey spent a year in Mexico City working with university students. He then joined the Boston Consulting Group as a management consultant and traveled extensively though Latin America. While on a business trip to Honduras, he reconnected with missionary friends he had met on past trips. Through these encounters and his interactions with Honduran culture, Chris Haughey decided he wanted to launch a company with positive social benefits in Tegucigalpa, Honduras. After conducting almost a year’s worth research and market validation, Chris left the Boston Consulting Group to found Tegu in March 2007.

Will Haughey graduated from Indiana University’s Kelley School of Business in 2004 and began working at Goldman Sachs. After success in the investment banking field, he joined Tegu full time in May 2008.

Tegu blocks are the first magnetic wooden blocks on the market and are manufactured using Huesito, Mahogany, Beech, and Primavera woods. The company name is derived from Honduras’ capital, Tegucigalpa.
