= Atlantic Airlines (Nicaragua) =

Nicaraguan airline

IATA	ICAO	Call sign
-	AYN	ATLANTIC NICARAGUA
- Founded: 1997
- Ceased operations: 2007
- Hubs: Managua International Airport
- Alliance: American Airlanes
- Fleet size: 6
- Destinations: 6
- Headquarters: Managua, Nicaragua

Atlantic Airlines was an airline based in Nicaragua's capital city, Managua. It was a scheduled and charter airline, established in 1997 and operating domestic and international flights in Central America. Its main base was Managua International Airport. The airline ceased operations in 2007.

== Destinations ==
- Managua - Bluefields - Daily
- Bluefields - Managua - Daily
- Bluefields - Big Corn Island - Daily
- Big Corn Island - Bluefields - Daily
- Managua - Puerto Cabezas - Daily
- Puerto Cabezas - Managua - Daily

== Accidents and incidents ==
Atlantic Airlines flight 870 came out On September 18, 2001. Crash at The Aurora International Airport, due a pilot error and loss of control due to incorrect weight distribution.

== Fleet ==
The Atlantic Airlines fleet includes the following aircraft (at March 2007):

- 5 Let L-410 UVP-E
- 1 Let L-410 UVP-E20
