= CM Airlines =

Honduran airline

IATA	ICAO	Call sign
H5	OMT	CMAIR
- Founded: 2007
- Commenced operations: 2008
- Operating bases: Toncontín International Airport
- Focus cities: La Ceiba Roatán San Pedro Sula
- Alliance: Transportes Aéreos Guatemaltecos Aero Ruta Maya
- Fleet size: 2
- Destinations: 8
- Headquarters: Tegucigalpa, Honduras
- Key people: Carlos Mourra
- Website: http://www.cmairlines.com/

CM Airlines, S. de R.L. is an airline in Honduras that was founded in 2007. According to the airline, "CM" stands for "Cielo Maya" (Mayan sky).

CM Airlines serves eight domestic airports within Honduras, as well as Guatemala City through a partnership with Transportes Aéreos Guatemaltecos.

CM Airlines was originally assigned the IATA code CC and is now assigned the IATA code H5.

== Destinations ==
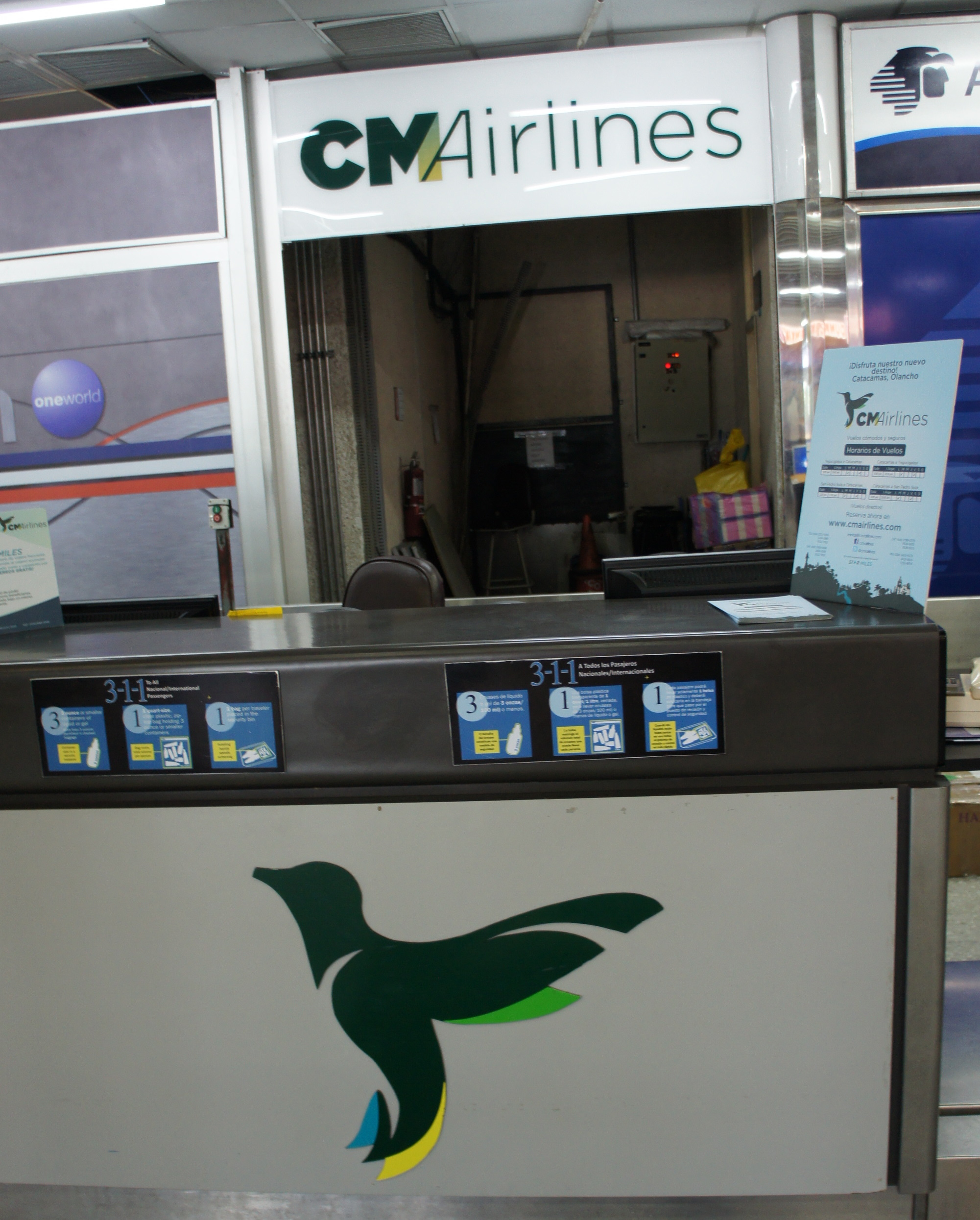
CM Airlines counter at San Pedro Sula, November 2011

CM Airlines operates flights to the following destinations as of June 2025:

Country	City	Airport	Notes	Refs
Honduras	Guanaja	Guanaja Airport		
Honduras	La Ceiba	Golosón International Airport	Seasonal	[2][4]
Honduras	Puerto Lempira	Puerto Lempira Airport	Focus city	[2][4]
Honduras	Roatán	Juan Manuel Gálvez International Airport	Secondary hub	[2][4]
Honduras	San Pedro Sula	Ramón Villeda Morales International Airport	Secondary hub	[2][4]
Honduras	Tegucigalpa	Toncontín International Airport	Hub	[2][4]
Guatemala	Guatemala City	La Aurora International Airport		[2][4]

== Fleet ==
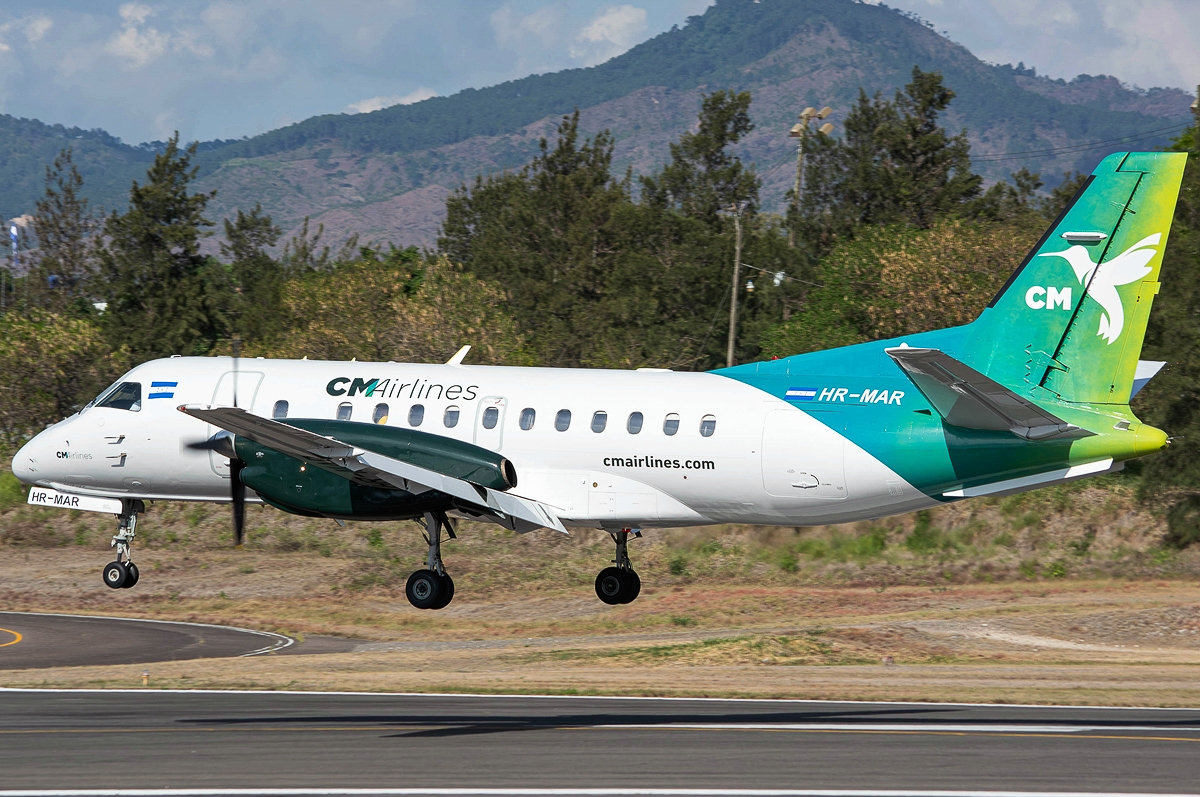
CM Airlines's Newest Plane, The Saab 340 landing in Toncontin.

=== Current Fleet ===
As of July 2026, CM Airlines operates the following aircraft:

Aircraft	In service	Orders	Passengers
Saab 340B	1	—	
Saab 340B(F)	1	—	
Total	2	—	

=== Former Fleet ===
- Embraer EMB 110 Bandeirante (TG-JCC, TG-JCO)
- ATR 72 (TG-ATB, TG-ATC, TG-ATD, TG-ATF)
- Twin Otter (TG-JOC)
- Let L-410 Turbolet (HR-AVI, HR-AXC, HR-AXD, HR-JMM)
