= Aerolíneas Sosa =

Honduran airline

Aerolíneas Sosa S.A. de C.V.
IATA	ICAO	Call sign
S0	NSO	SOSA
- Founded: 1976; 46 years ago
- Hubs: Golosón International Airport
- Fleet size: 12
- Destinations: 5
- Headquarters: La Ceiba, Honduras
- Key people: Antonio Sosa (CEO), Frank Portillo (Manager)
- Website: als.aerocrs.net

Aerolíneas Sosa S.A. de C.V. is an airline based in La Ceiba, Honduras. It was established in 1976 and operates domestic scheduled services to 4 destinations from La Ceiba, as well as charter flights. Its main hub is Golosón International Airport, La Ceiba.

== Destinations ==
Aerolíneas Sosa S.A. de C.V. operates services to the following scheduled domestic destinations:

- La Ceiba (LCE) – Golosón International Airport
- Roatán (RTB) – Juan Manuel Gálvez International Airport
- San Pedro Sula (SAP) – Ramón Villeda Morales International Airport
- Tegucigalpa (TGU) – Toncontín International Airport
- Útila (UII) – Útila Airport

== Fleet ==
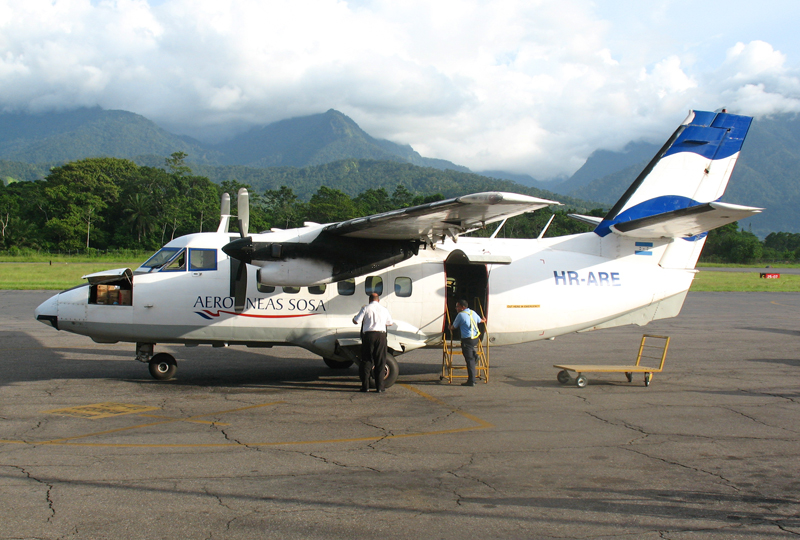
Aerolíneas Sosa Let L-410

=== Current fleet ===
As of July 2026, Aerolíneas Sosa operates the following aircraft:

Aircraft	Total	Passengers
BAe Jetstream 31	3	19
BAe Jetstream 32	2	19
Saab 340B	6	34
Bombardier CRJ100ER	1	50

=== Former fleet ===
As of August 2025, Aerolíneas Sosa operated 3 BAe Jetstream 31, 2 BAe Jetstream 32, 1 CRJ100 and 5 Saab 340B

The airline also previously operated the following aircraft:

- 1 further Saab 340
- 3 further Let L-410
- 1 Britten-Norman Islander
- 1 Bombardier CRJ100ER

== Incidents and accidents ==
On 7 March 1998, an engine on a Let L-410 UVP aircraft carrying two crew members and 15 passengers failed shortly after takeoff from Golosón International Airport, forcing the crew to turn back to the airport. The wing struck a house, causing the Let to crash into a street. There were no fatalities, but the aircraft was written off.
