= Guanaja Airport =

Guanaja Airport Aeropuerto de Guanaja
- IATA: GJA; ICAO: MHNJ

Summary
- Airport type: Public
- Location: Guanaja, Honduras
- Elevation AMSL: 49 ft (15 m)
- Coordinates: 16°26′43″N 85°54′24″W

Map
- Location in Honduras

Runways
Direction	Length		Surface
Direction	m	ft	Surface
12/30	1,220	4,003	Asphalt
- Source: WAD GCM SkyVector

Guanaja Airport (Spanish: Aeropuerto de Guanaja) (IATA: GJA, ICAO: MHNJ) is an airport serving Guanaja, an island of the Bay Islands Department in Honduras.

Guanaja is one of the Bay Islands (Islas de la Bahía) located in the Caribbean, approximately 70 km (38 nmi; 43 mi) off the north coast of Honduras and 12 km (6.5 nmi; 7.5 mi) from the island of Roatan.

== Facilities ==
The airport resides at an elevation of 49 ft (15 m) above mean sea level. It has one runway designated 12/30 with an asphalt surface measuring 1,220 m × 18 m (4,003 ft × 59 ft).

The Roatan VOR-DME (Ident: ROA) is located 36.3 nautical miles (67.2 km) west-southwest of the airport. The Punta Castilla non-directional beacon (Ident: CTL) is located 26.6 nautical miles (49.3 km) south of Guanaja.

== Airlines and destinations ==
Airlines	Destinations
CM Airlines	La Ceiba, Roatán

== See also ==
- Transport in Honduras
- List of airports in Honduras
