= Juan Manuel Gálvez International Airport =

Honduran airport located on the Island of Roatán

Juan Manuel Gálvez International Airport Roatán International Airport
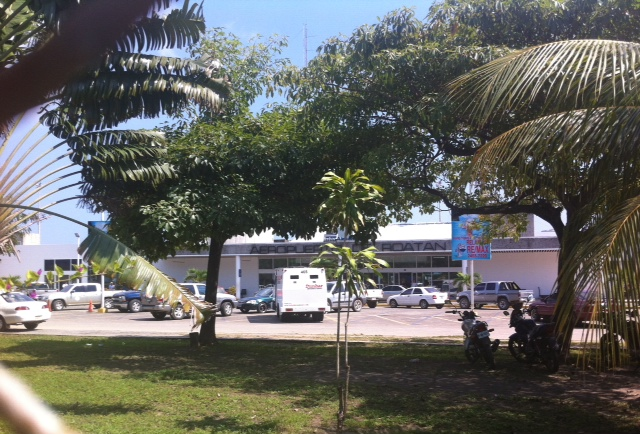
- IATA: RTB; ICAO: MHRO

Summary
- Airport type: Public
- Operator: EHISA
- Location: Roatán, Honduras
- Elevation AMSL: 20 ft (6.1 m)
- Coordinates: 16°19′02″N 86°31′20″W
- Website: www.interairports.hn

Map
- Location in Honduras

Runways
Direction	Length		Surface
Direction	m	ft	Surface
07/25	2,245	7,365	Asphalt

Statistics (2023)
- Passengers: 550,422
- Source: Honduran AIP, SAN, GCM

Juan Manuel Gálvez International Airport (Spanish: Aeropuerto Internacional Juan Manuel Gálvez) (IATA: RTB, ICAO: MHRO) is an international airport located on the island of Roatán, in the Caribbean Sea 50 kilometres (31 mi) off the northern coast of Honduras. Roatán is in the Bay Islands Department of Honduras.

The airport serves national and international air traffic of the island, the nearby cities and for the region. The airport is named for Juan Manuel Gálvez (1889–1972), the former president of the Republic of Honduras in 1949–1952. It was known previously as Roatán International Airport.

== Location ==
The airport is located in the western part of Roatán, near the main city of Coxen Hole.

== Renovation ==
In 2013, InterAirports completed an expansion and upgrade of the airport facilities. The expansion included a larger check-in area with coffee shop and cafe, larger waiting area with sitting area and cafe, expansion of the customs and security areas, and renovation of buildings and outdoor areas.

The next phase of the project will be an expansion of the airport's car parks and pick-up and drop-off locations, rental area, and shopping area. In January 2022, the runway extension work will begin, so the airport can pass 3 million passengers per year and accept intercontinental flights.

== Runway ==
The airport is at an elevation of 20 feet (6 m) above mean sea level. It has one runway designated 07/25 with an asphalt surface measuring 2,090 by 45 metres (6,857 ft × 148 ft).

== Airlines and destinations ==
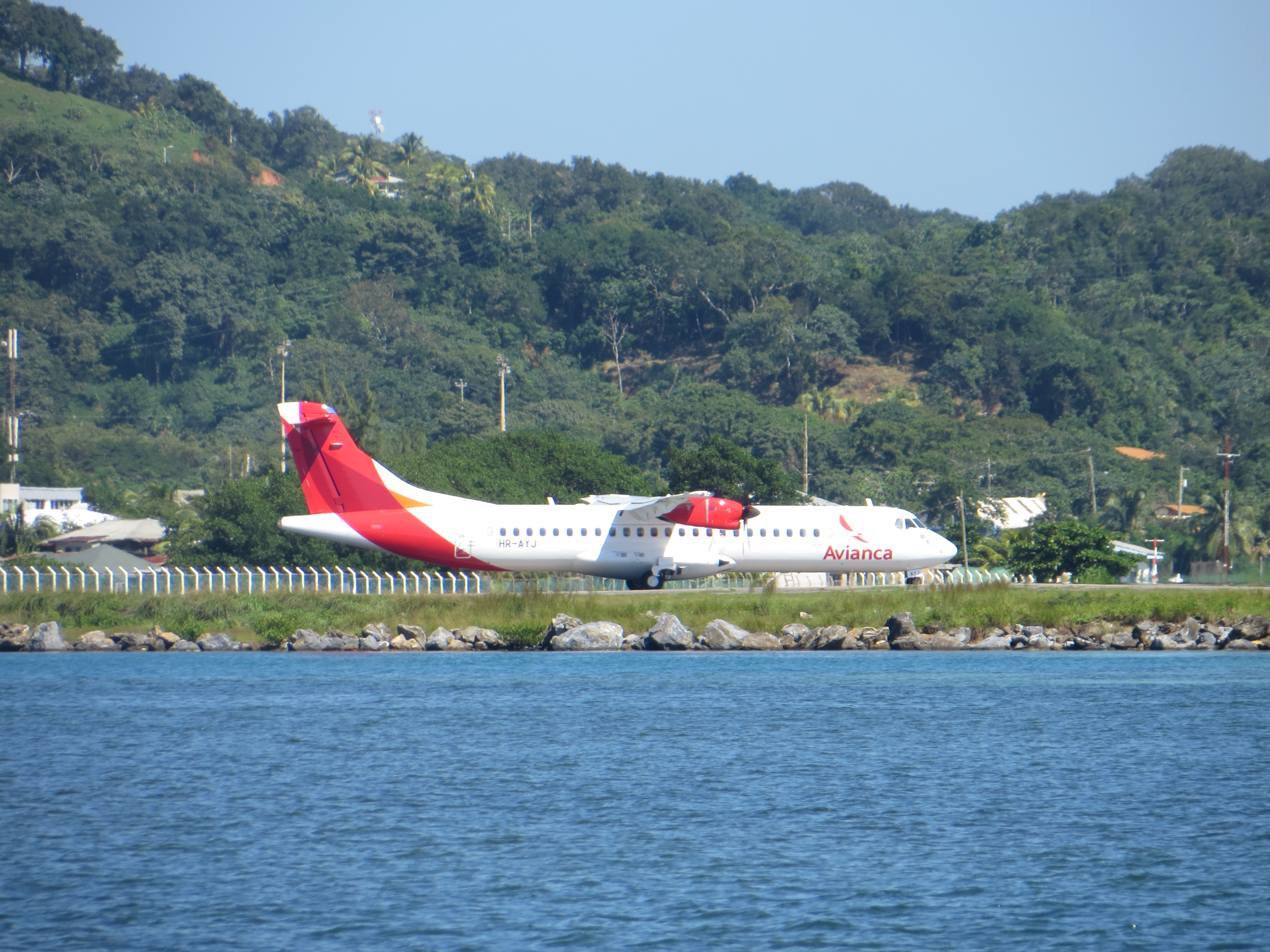
An Avianca Honduras ATR 72 taxiing for take-off

=== Passenger ===
Airlines	Destinations
Aerolíneas Sosa	La Ceiba, San Pedro Sula, Tegucigalpa
Air Canada	Seasonal: Montréal–Trudeau (begins 12 December 2026), Toronto–Pearson (begins 13 December 2026)
American Airlines	Dallas/Fort Worth, Miami
CM Airlines	Guanaja, San Pedro Sula, Tegucigalpa
Delta Air Lines	Atlanta
Sun Country Airlines	Seasonal: Minneapolis/St. Paul
TAG Airlines	Guatemala City, San Salvador
Tropic Air	Belize City
United Airlines	Houston–Intercontinental; Seasonal: Denver
WestJet	Seasonal: Montréal–Trudeau, Quebec City, Toronto–Pearson

== Accidents and incidents ==
- On 18 March 1990, Douglas DC-3A HR-SAZ of SAHSA overran the runway on landing and ended up in the sea. The aircraft, performing a domestic scheduled passenger service, was damaged beyond repair but all 32 people on board escaped.
- On 17 May 2019, a private aircraft crashed while approaching runway 25 from north. The aircraft impacted the waters of the Roatan beach in Bahia Island under unknown circumstances. The aircraft was destroyed during the accident sequence and five occupants on board received fatal injuries. One occupant on board initially survived with unspecified injuries but later died from the injuries sustained in the crash.
- On 4 January 2022, a BAe Jetstream 31 operated by LANHSA, registration HR-AYY, suffered a right-hand main landing gear collapse upon landing on runway 07. The no.2 propeller struck the runway and the aircraft swung off the right side of the runway, coming to rest on soft ground. There were no injuries or fatalities.

== See also ==
- Transport in Honduras
- List of airports in Honduras
