= Toncontín International Airport =

National airport in Tegucigalpa, Honduras

Toncontín Airport Aeropuerto Toncontín
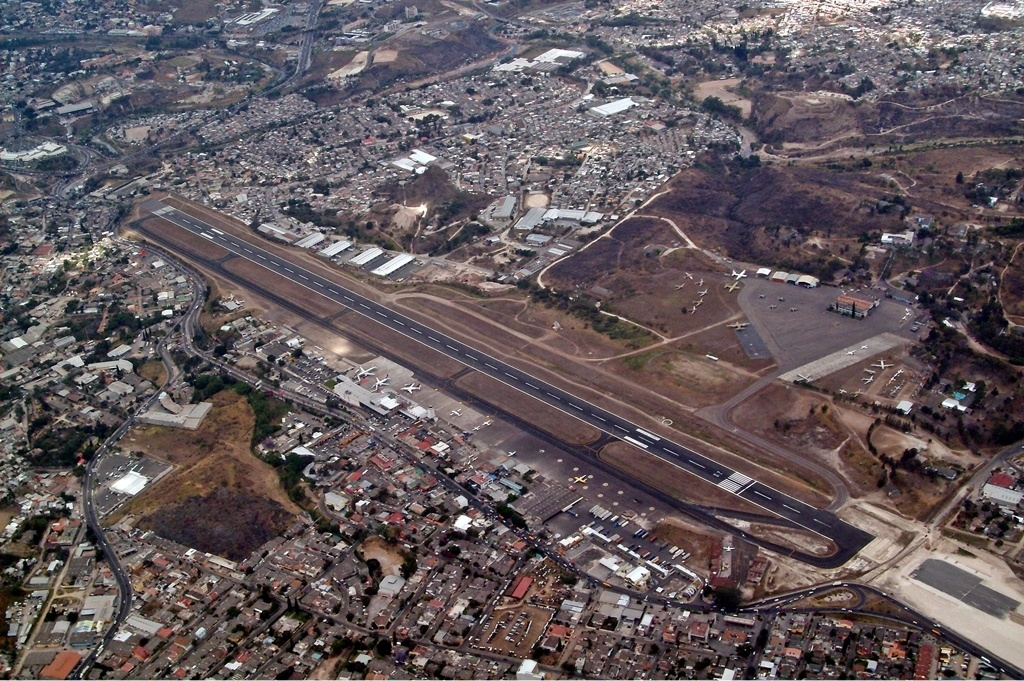
- IATA: TGU; ICAO: MHTG

Summary
- Airport type: Military/Public
- Owner/Operator: EMCO S.A
- Serves: Tegucigalpa, Honduras
- Elevation AMSL: 3,307 ft (1,008 m)
- Coordinates: 14°03′42″N 087°13′01″W
- Website: toncontin.aeropuerto.hn

Map
- Location in Honduras

Runways
Direction	Length		Surface
Direction	m	ft	Surface
02/20	2,163	7,096	Asphalt

Statistics (2018)
- Total Passengers: 617,526
- Source: AIP, EMCO, S.A.

Toncontín Airport (IATA: TGU, ICAO: MHTG) formerly Toncontín International Airport, also known as Teniente Coronel Hernán Acosta Mejía Airport, is a civil and military airport located 6 kilometres (4 mi) from the centre of Tegucigalpa, Honduras.

The History Channel programme Most Extreme Airports ranks it as the second most extreme airport in the world. The approach to the airport is considered to be one of the most difficult in the world to all aircraft, especially in inclement weather conditions.

== History ==
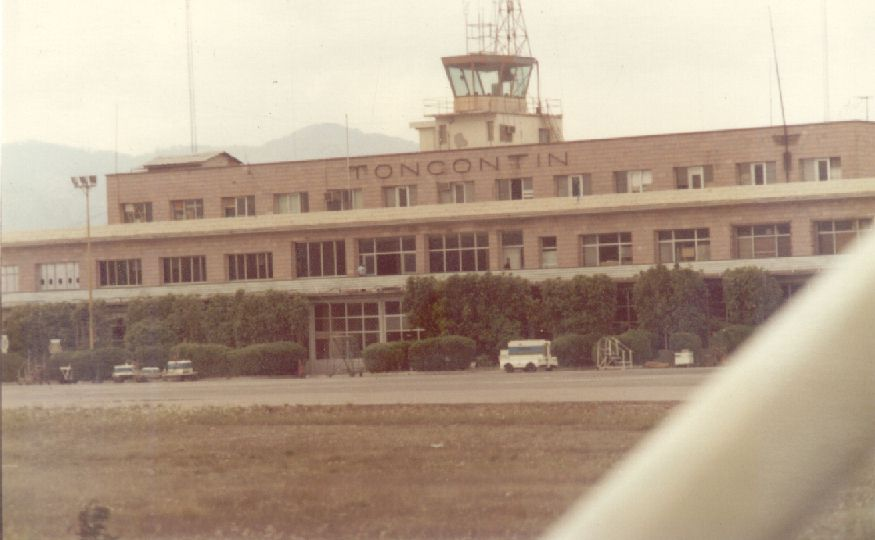
Toncontín in the 1980s

Since the 19th century, the plains south of Tegucigalpa became known as the "Potrero Los Llanos", part of a farm adjoining the farm Loarque. In these areas, some political events took place. José Santos Guardiola defeated General José Trinidad Cabañas, seizing presidency of the republic. "El Llano", as it was known, is to the south end of Comayagüela. On a road to the south is the field that served for the takeoff and landing of aircraft. Currently, this forms the Hernán Acosta Mejía (HAM) Air Force base. The first landing was in 1921 when a single-engine plane from the Bristol Aeroplane Company landed with Captain Dean Ivan Lamb in command. He was received by President Rafael López Gutiérrez who broke a bottle of champagne on one of the aircraft's propellers.

The origin of the name Toncontín is unknown, but experts say that it is a word derived from the Nahuatl word "Tocotín", the name of an ancient and sacred dance of Yucatán in Mexico.

Aviator Luigi Venditti conducted several flights using the natural floodplain from Toncontín. Jose Villa, an Italian national, was another precursor of Honduran aviation who conducted flights from Toncontín, as did Starnaivola, Enrique Massi, Ball, and Clarence H. Brown.

The civil war in 1924 caused President Tiburcio Carías Andino to realise that aviation had a great future in Honduras, providing an ideal transport solution for the mountainous country, as well as being a strategic military weapon. For these reasons and with the growth of commercial aviation and the emergence of the Honduran Air Force, General Tiburcio Carías acquired the land that was to become Toncontín Airport in 1933. On January 5, 1934, the airport was inaugurated with the landing of a Douglas DC-3 from Pan American World Airways. Months later TACA opened "Hotel Toncontín" to accommodate passengers in transit, and Pan-Am built a hangar.

During the Football War of 1969, Toncontín Airport was a major target for the Salvadoran Air Force, and was bombed on several occasions, thus preventing the Honduran Air Force from launching its aircraft. The airport was repaired in a matter of days, and the Hondurans countered, making good progress.

== Facilities ==
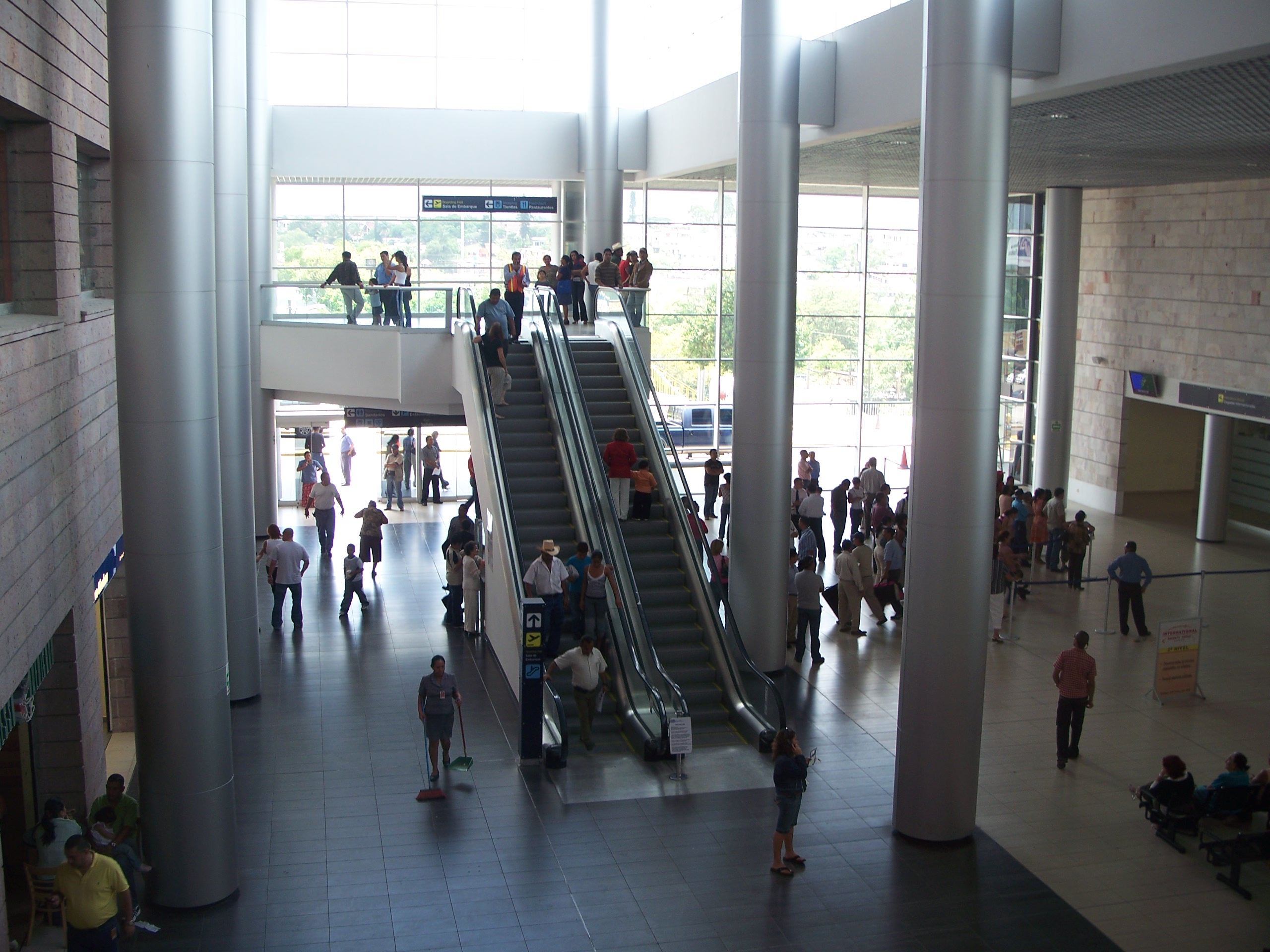
Interior of Toncontín

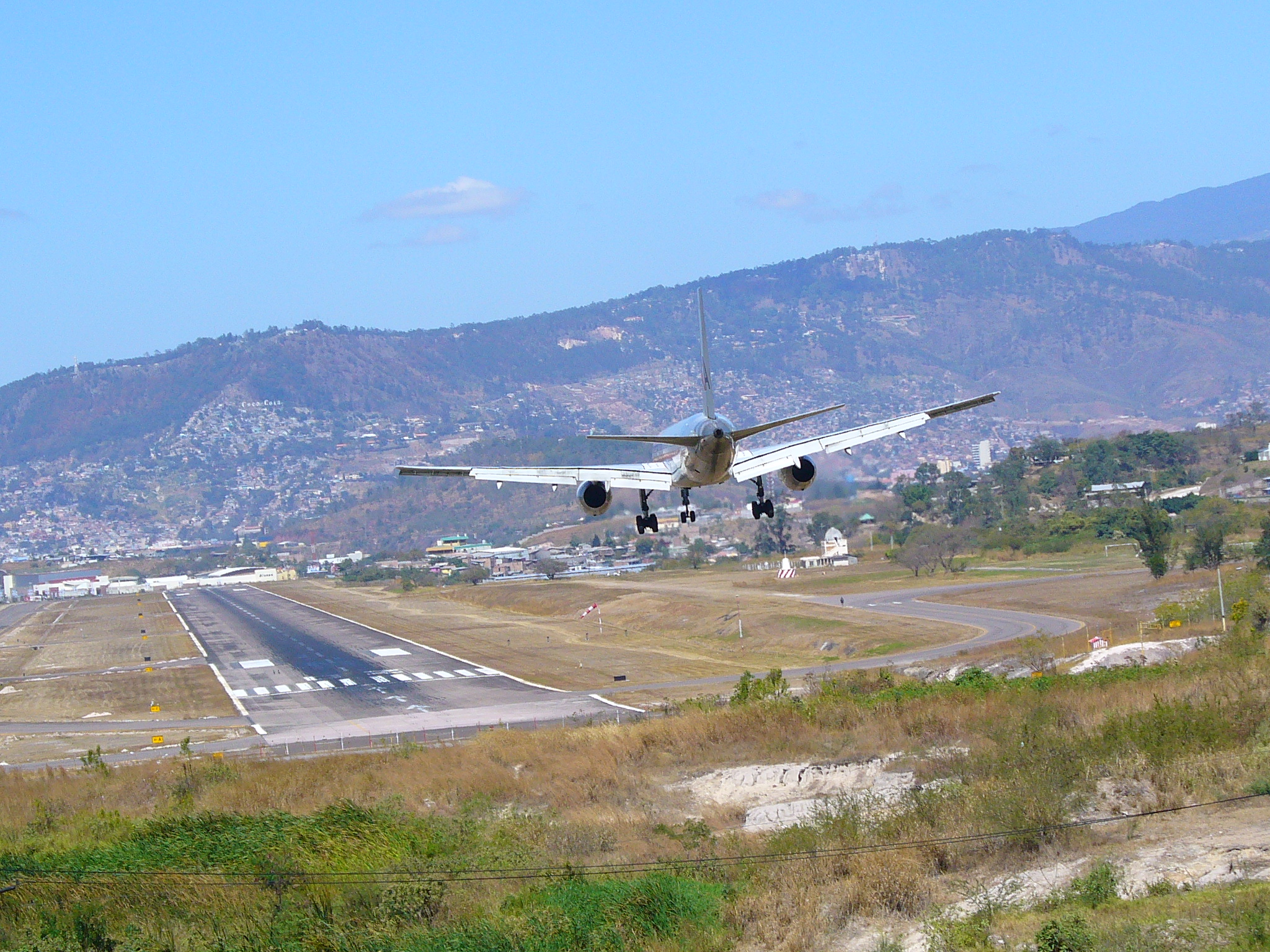
Toncontín before the renovation of the hillside runway

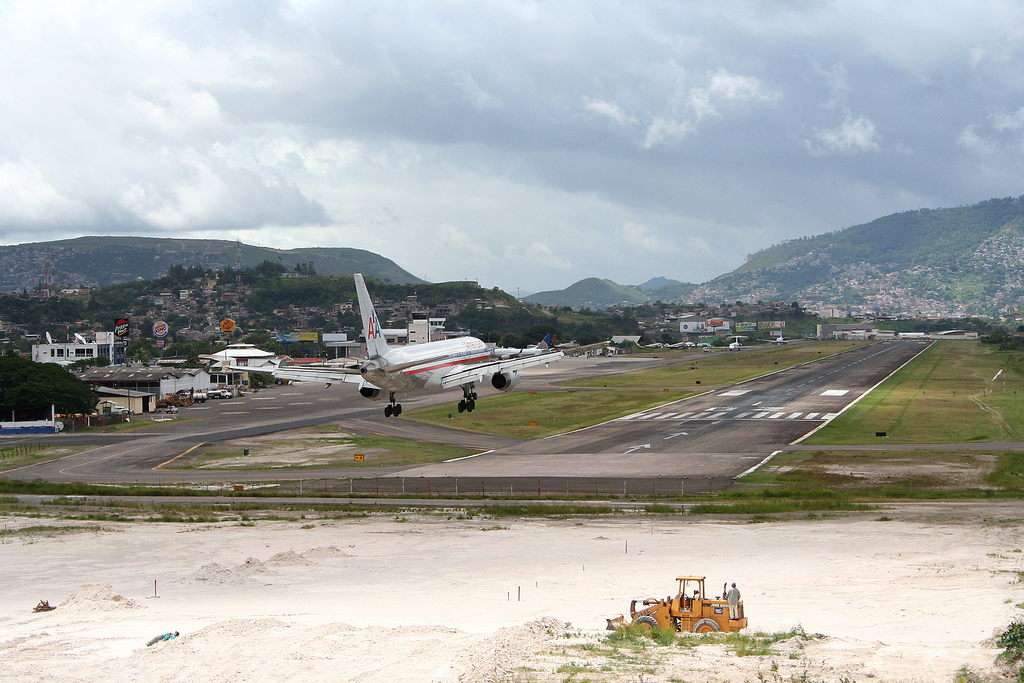
Toncontín after the renovation of the hillside runway

The airport received much notoriety as being one of the most dangerous in the world due to its proximity to mountainous terrain, its short runway, and its historically difficult approach to runway 02. For years efforts were made to replace it with Soto Cano Air Base in Comayagua, which did not occur until 2021 when Comayagua International Airport opened there. In the meantime, Toncontín was significantly improved by the work of the Airport Corporation of Tegucigalpa (ACT) and InterAirports, a company contracted by the Honduran government to administer the country's four major airports.

The airport has a single asphalt runway, situated at an elevation of 1,005 m (3,297 ft) AMSL. Until May 2009, the runway was only 6,112 ft (1,863 m) in length. In 2007, the approach to runway 02 was made significantly easier by work which systematically bulldozed a large portion of the hillside, immediately before the threshold. Following this work, in May 2009, the southern end of the runway received a 984 ft (300 m) extension, lengthening it to 7,096 ft (2,163 m). As of 2011, the runway is listed as being 2,021 m × 45 m (6,631 ft × 148 ft).

Boeing 737-200s operated by seasonal charter airline Aviatsa are the largest aircraft that normally land at Toncontín. Even with its recent runway extension, Toncontín's runway is still significantly shorter than that of most international airports. It is so short, in fact, that many aircraft seen by plane spotters are seen to be touching down on the displaced threshold of the runway, which by aviation law is not allowed to be landed on.

Historically, larger aircraft have occasionally landed at Toncontín, such as a Douglas DC-8 on a mission with Orbis International in 1987, a C-17 Globemaster in 2008, 2009 and 2011, and Boeing 757s operated by American Airlines, which in 2015 replaced them with Airbus A319s. In the 1980s and early 1990s, SAHSA operated Boeing 727s and Boeing 737s from its hub at Toncontín.

Toncontín International Airport has 4 gates (2 in the new terminal), a post office, a bank and bureau de change, many restaurants, and several airline lounges, as well as a duty-free shop, car rental services, and a first-aid room. The old terminal is undergoing renovation, and will be used for domestic flights in the future. The new terminal was used for international flights until 2021.

Toncontín was also the home of the Aeroclub de Honduras (Honduran Air Club).

== International flights suspension ==
On May 30, 2008, the crash of TACA Flight 390 prompted the announcement by then Honduran President Manuel Zelaya that all large aircraft operations would move to the Soto Cano Air Base. This move would effectively move all international traffic from Toncontín, limiting its use to only domestic flights and small aircraft.

The International Civil Aviation Organization (ICAO) completed a review of Toncontín and made safety recommendations regarding the airport. On June 25, 2008, President Zelaya reiterated his position of severely restricting international traffic to and from Toncontín and announced his intention to form a commission that would oversee implementing the safety recommendations of the ICAO report.

On July 8, 2008, President Zelaya announced the reopening of Toncontín airport at a news conference following a three-hour meeting with businessmen, who had demanded commercial flights resume at Toncontín due to Soto Cano Air Base being too far from Tegucigalpa. Zelaya reiterated that all commercial flights would eventually use the new airport at Soto Cano from 2009. This however, was canceled after Zelaya was removed from office on June 28, 2009, in the 2009 Honduran coup d'état. International flights continued to operate to Toncontín until November 16, 2021.

== Current day ==
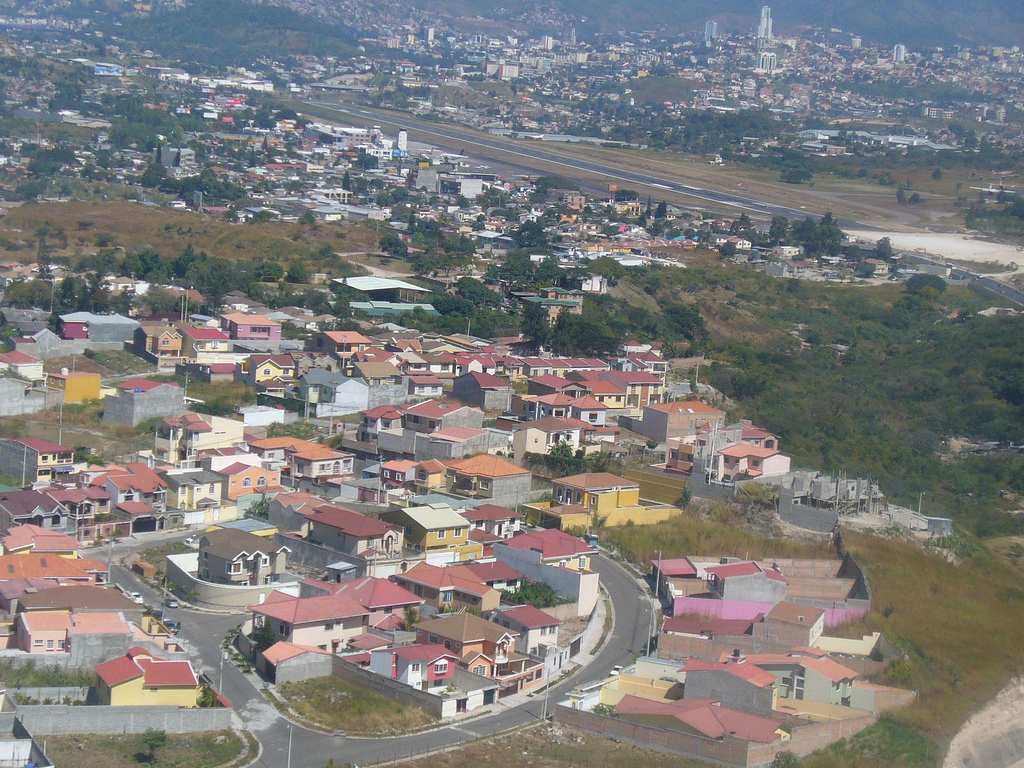
Aerial view of Toncontín International Airport

- In 2009 TACA Airlines could not operate to Toncontín and apparently the rest of the country's airports because of a state debt to Honduras, but on May 20, 2009, TACA said that the problems with Honduras were resolved.
- In 2009 Authorities at the airport finally decided to make use of masks and other measures to prevent the H1N1 flu virus, since the number of cases had risen to 34 in the country.
- In 2009, one year after the crash of TACA Flight 390 at Toncontín airport that killed five people, business owners near the site of the tragedy complained that they had not been compensated.
- In 2008 Honduras' President Manuel Zelaya said that Tegucigalpa, the capital of the country, would benefit from the construction of the Palmerola airport, while others claim that this was an attempt to close Toncontín.
- The Civil Aviation Authority of Honduras temporarily suspended the operating license of Islena Airlines, part of the Taca El Salvador group, for outstanding debts of 37 million Honduran lempira, leaving the service of internal flights to Honduras in crisis.
- In May 2009, a 984 ft (300 m) extension was completed on the south end of the runway, increasing the length of the runway from 6,112 ft (1,863 m) to 7,096 ft (2,163 m). The extension is helpful for take-offs to the north, and rare landings from the north, however, it is debatable whether it will assist with standard landings from the south due to the proximity to nearby mountains.
- On July 5, 2009, the airport was closed to all flights and the airspace in and around Toncontín was severely restricted due to the planned arrival of ousted Honduran president Manuel Zelaya. Zelaya's private Venezuelan jet was not given landing clearance by the Authorities at Toncontín and the military blocked the single runway with vehicles and troops. The plane was then diverted to Managua, Nicaragua.
- Due to the bombing attempt by Al-Qaeda of Northwest Airlines Flight 253 on December 25, 2009; the security at Toncontín was increased with the use of undercover police officers at the airport.
- On January 27, 2010, Honduran ex-president Manuel Zelaya and his family left the country after 120 days seeking refuge at the Brazilian Embassy, they left at 14:45 from Toncontín International Airport, to the Dominican Republic, where Zelaya proposed to hold a trial against the people who ran the 2009 Honduran constitutional crisis. Thousands of Hondurans were present outside the airport to witness the moment Zelaya left the country.
- In April 2011, the airport authority and the government of Honduras resumed airport relocation talks and announced that work on the new Palmerola airport would start by the fall of 2011 after years of efforts to replace Toncontín International with an airport at Palmerola in Comayagua where the Soto Cano Air Base is located. However, in a September 25, 2011 update, President Lobo stated officials were still "evaluating the pros and cons" of constructing the new airport. This comes three years after former President Manuel Zelaya had announced that all commercial flights would be transferred to Soto Cano Air Base; however, work on the new terminal at Soto Cano was then cancelled after Zelaya was removed from office on 28 June 2009 in the 2009 Honduran coup d'état. Upon realization of the Palmerola airport, commercial flights to and from Toncontín would continue to operate but will be limited to small aircraft and domestic flights.
- During 2018, the airport received 625,593 passengers.
- As of December 15, 2021, all international carriers operating at Toncontin had moved operations to the new recently inaugurated Comayagua International Airport located in the military air base of Palmerola, located 70 km (43 mi) from Tegucigalpa. Among the airlines that have moved operations are: American Airlines, Avianca El Salvador, Copa Airlines and United Airlines. Airlines such as Aeroméxico Connect and Spirit Airlines are the new international carriers operating to/from Tegucigalpa/Comayagua.
- As of 2025, a cargo airline is the sole airline operating international flights out of the airport.

== Airlines and destinations ==
=== Passenger ===
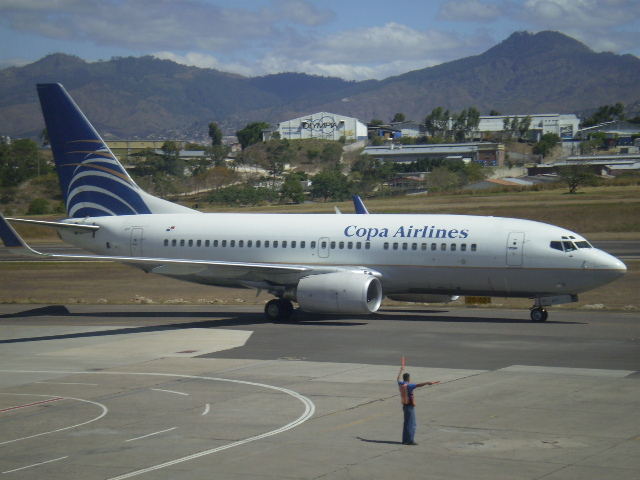
Copa Airlines Boeing 737-700 in Tegucigalpa

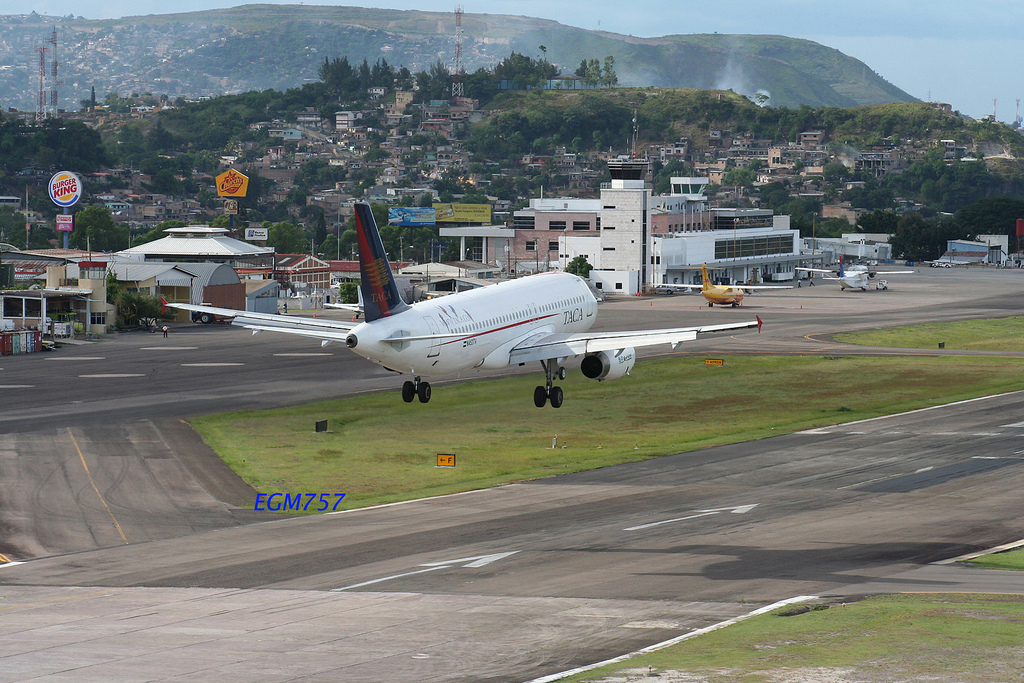
TACA Airbus A320-200 in Tegucigalpa

Airlines	Destinations
Aerolíneas Sosa	La Ceiba, Roatán
Aviatsa	Seasonal charter: Roatán
CM Airlines	Puerto Lempira, Roatán, San Pedro Sula

=== Cargo ===
Airlines	Destinations
DHL de Guatemala	Guatemala City

== Operations ==
=== Runway 02 approach ===
Because of the terrain in Tegucigalpa, aircraft cannot easily be accommodated on a traditional straight-in approach for Runway 02, the most frequently used runway because of wind direction. Instead, an RNAV (GPS) approach is used, resembling a circle-to-land approach. Aircraft are routed through shallower terrain in a circular fashion, then follow along the Anillo Periferico road to a cloverleaf interchange, at which point aircraft take a sharp left turn to line up with runway 02. Until the partial demolition of the hillside, aircraft experienced limited ground clearance just before the threshold, hence had to approach slightly higher than optimal, increasing the challenge of the landing already made challenging by the short 1,830 metres (6,000 ft) runway. To maximize the amount of runway available, many aircraft land on the 350 metres (1,150 ft) displaced threshold, just before the actual 02 threshold.

=== Runway 02 departure ===
Departures from runway 02 must turn to a heading of 018 degrees and then climb swiftly to 9000 feet to avoid mountainous terrain just north of the airport. Because of the short length of the runway and the high altitude of the airport, aircraft require a large amount of power to do this, making late go-arounds potentially dangerous if not executed properly, especially in a plane with a poorer power-to-weight ratio that climbs slower.

== Accidents and incidents ==
- 7 June 1962: A Curtiss C-46 Commando, (HR-SAL), a cargo flight operated by SAHSA, crash-landed at Toncontín when the left undercarriage collapsed on touchdown. Both crew members survived but the aircraft was damaged beyond repair.
- 30 June 1966: A Douglas DC-6, (HR-TNG), operated by Transportes Aéreos Nacionales overran the runway on landing and was destroyed by fire.
- 20 February 1967: A Douglas DC-6, (HR-SAS) operated by SAHSA overran the runway whilst attempting to land on runway 01 at Toncontín. According to crew reports, the reverse thrust mechanism failed to engage and the crew had to brake hard causing two tires to catch fire. The nose gear overran the runway into a ditch, followed by the left main gear leg. Out of 50 passengers and 5 crew on board, 4 were killed.
- 25 November 1969: A Douglas DC-3, (HR-ANA), operated by SAHSA crashed while attempting to land on runway 01 at Toncontín. A strong wind gust upset the aircraft during flare, which pushed the aircraft towards the terminal buildings. The crew force-turned away from the buildings and crashed. All 15 passengers and 3 crew survived.
- 26 May 1970: A de Havilland Heron operated by Aero Servicios crashed during approach to runway 19, 1.5 km (0.93 mi) from the runway. The aircraft banked steeply to the left, and crashed in a nearby valley. The cause of the accident was attributed to a stall brought about by turbulent wind conditions at low altitude. 4 passengers and 2 crew were killed.
- 25 February 1989: A privately owned Douglas DC-6 (HR-AKZ) struck a mountain on approach to Toncontín and crashed. All 10 people aboard were killed.
- 21 October 1989: TAN-SAHSA Flight 414, a Boeing 727-200 on approach to runway 01 at Toncontín, crashed into a nearby hill, killing 131 of 146 people aboard. The cause of the crash was attributed to pilot error by disregarding the prescribed approach procedures.
- 1 April 1997: A U.S. Air Force C-130 cargo plane overshot the runway at Toncontín and came to rest on a civilian highway interchange, where it caught fire. The cause of the crash was attributed to excess speed on landing, resulting in a prolonged flare. The aircraft touched down 2,000 ft (610 m) beyond the runway 02 threshold.
- 30 May 2008: TACA Flight 390, an Airbus A320, overran the runway after landing on runway 02 at Toncontín. The aircraft plunged 20m down an embankment and came to rest on a road. 3 of the 124 people aboard and 2 people on the ground were killed.
- 14 February 2011: Central American Airways Flight 731, a Let L-410 Turbolet, crashed on approach to Toncontin 20 km from the airport, in Las Mesitas, Municipio de Santa Ana. All 14 aboard were killed.
- 22 May 2018: A chartered Gulfstream G200 jet flying from Texas to Honduras crash landed at the Toncontin International Airport in Honduras's capital Tegucigalpa. At least six Americans were injured. The Gulfstream G200 aircraft was on a private flight from Austin, Texas, when it skidded off the runway. Authorities have given conflicting accounts of how many were on board, some saying six or nine, but a police official did say "Thank God there are no fatalities." One witness told AFP he helped five men and a woman out of the plane, all of whom were "practically unharmed". The executive jet, which split in half, had veered into a ditch, a Honduran official told local media.

== See also ==
- West-Wind (Honduran Presidential Plane)
- Military of Honduras
- Transport in Honduras
- List of airports in Honduras
- List of the busiest airports in Central America
