= Golosón International Airport =

Airport in Honduras

Golosón International Airport Aeropuerto Internacional Golosón
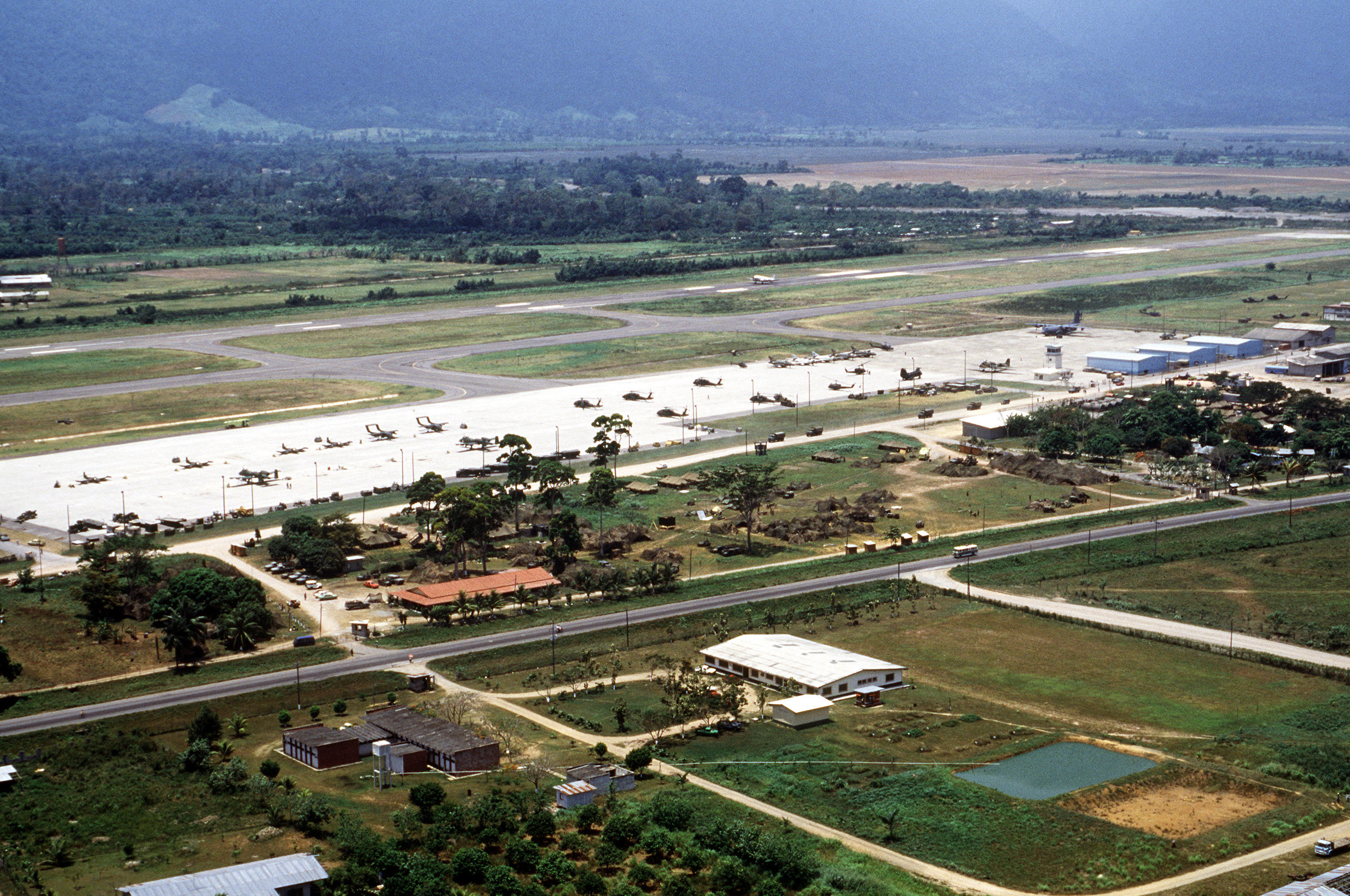
- IATA: LCE; ICAO: MHLC

Summary
- Airport type: Military/Public
- Operator: EHISA
- Serves: La Ceiba, Honduras
- Elevation AMSL: 49 ft (15 m)
- Coordinates: 15°44′32″N 86°51′10″W

Map
- Location in Honduras

Runways
Direction	Length		Surface
Direction	m	ft	Surface
07/25	2,950	9,678	Asphalt

Statistics (2023)
- Passengers: 186,570
- Source: Honduran AIP, SkyVector SAN, GCM

Golosón International Airport (Spanish: Aeropuerto Internacional Golosón) (IATA: LCE, ICAO: MHLC) is an airport located on the western side of the city of La Ceiba, in the Atlántida Department on the north coast of Honduras. It is also known as La Ceiba Airport (Aeropuerto de La Ceiba) and Hector C. Moncada Air Base (Base Aérea Hector C. Moncada).

== Facilities ==
The airport is at an elevation of 49 ft (15 m) above mean sea level. It has one runway with an asphalt surface measuring 2,950 by 45 metres (9,678 ft × 148 ft).

== Airlines and destinations ==
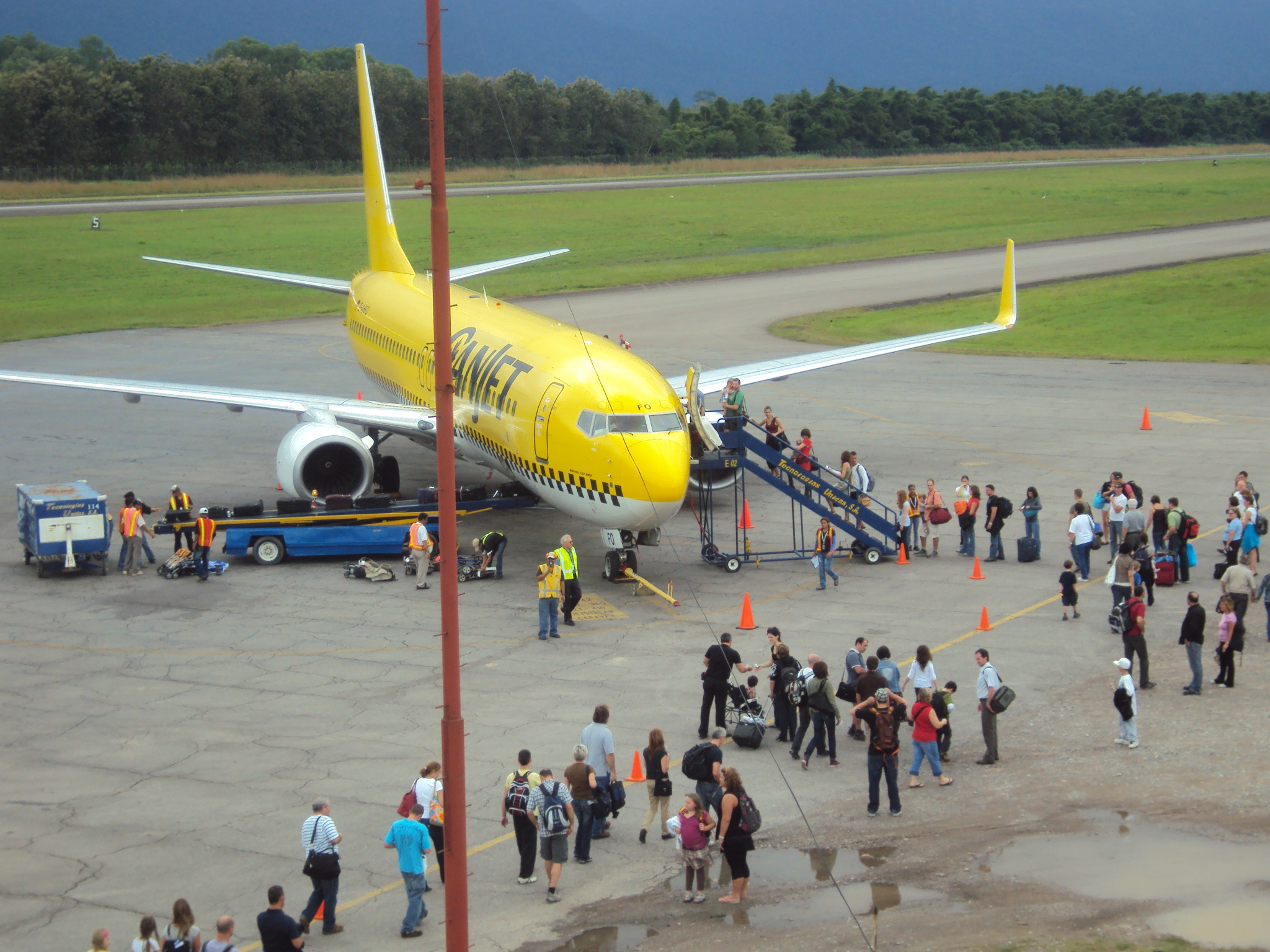
A Canjet Boeing 737-800 at Golosón, 2010

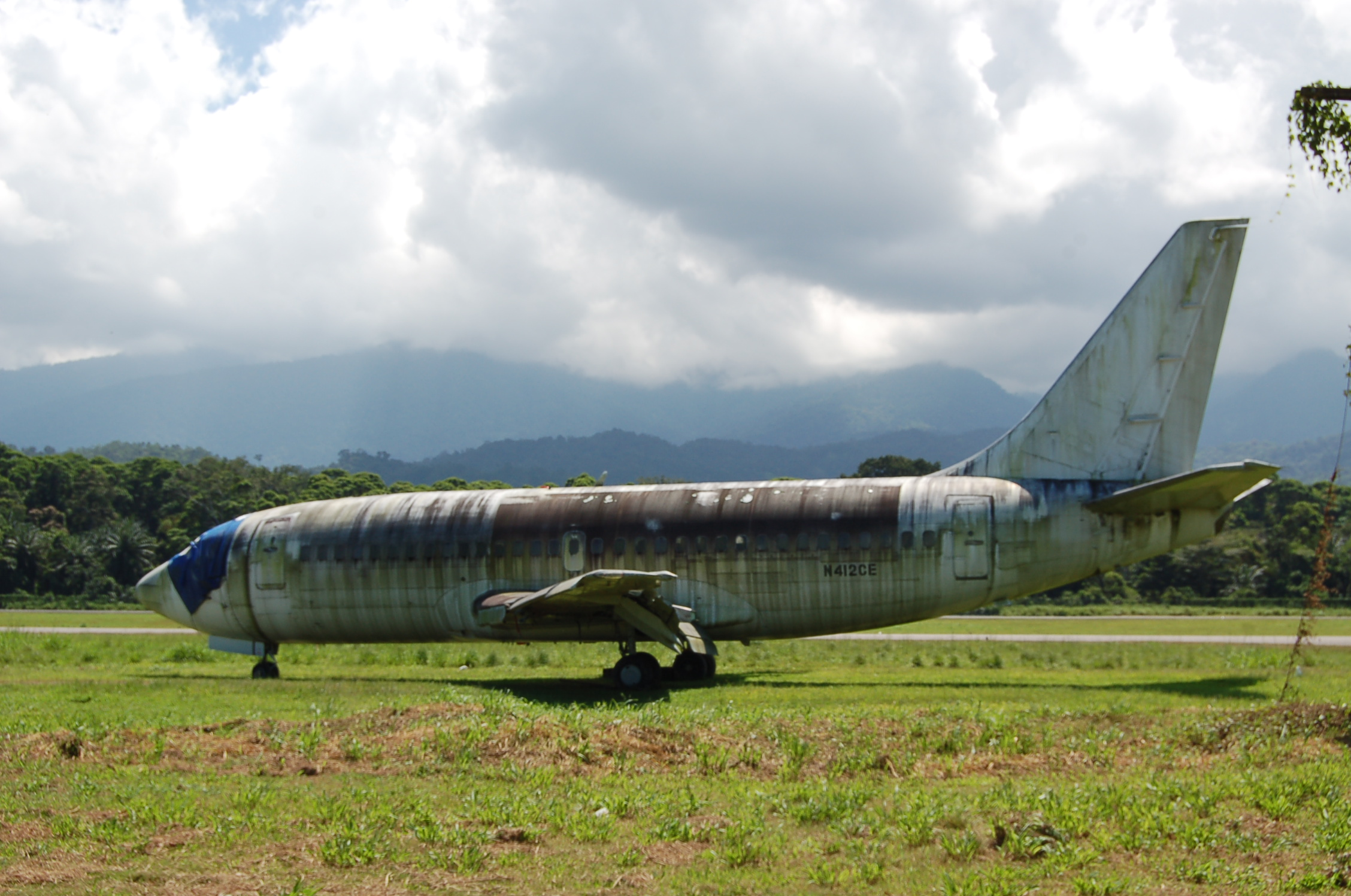
A degrading Boeing 737-205 at the airport. This aircraft was involved in the hijacking of Braathens SAFE Flight 139

Airlines	Destinations
Aerolineas Sosa	Roatan, San Pedro Sula, Tegucigalpa
Cayman Airways	Grand Cayman
CM Airlines	Guanaja, Puerto Lempira

== Historical airline service ==
SAHSA (Servicio Aereo de Honduras S.A., the former national flag carrier airline of Honduras) was serving La Ceiba in 1950 with Douglas DC-3 domestic flights in Honduras with its schedules appearing in a Pan American World Airways (Pan Am) system timetable at the time. In early 1980, Belize Airways Ltd. was operating British Aircraft Corporation BAC One-Eleven series 500 jet service nonstop between the airport and Belize City with this flight offering direct, one stop connecting service to and from Miami. According to the Official Airline Guide (OAG), by the spring of 1980 Transportes Aereos Nacionales (also known as TAN Airlines) was operating direct one stop service to Miami with Boeing 737-200 jets and Lockheed L-188 Electra turboprops via San Pedro Sula. Also according to the OAG, two airlines were serving the airport in 1993 including SAHSA with Boeing 737-200 jet service nonstop from Grand Cayman, Roatan, San Pedro Sula and Tegucigalpa as well as direct, no change of plane 737 jet flights from Miami, New Orleans and Belize City; and local air carrier Islena Airlines (now Avianca Honduras) with domestic Honduran service operated with Fokker F27 Friendship, Embraer EMB-110 Bandeirante and Beechcraft 99 turboprops.

== See also ==
- Transport in Honduras
- List of airports in Honduras
