= Ramón Villeda Morales International Airport =

Airport serving San Pedro Sula, Honduras; located in La Lima, Cortés

Ramón Villeda Morales International Airport Aeropuerto Internacional Ramón Villeda Morales
- IATA: SAP; ICAO: MHLM

Summary
- Airport type: Public / Military
- Serves: San Pedro Sula
- Location: San Pedro Sula, Cortés Department, Honduras
- Opened: February 1965; 61 years ago
- Hub for: CM Airlines
- Elevation AMSL: 92 ft (28 m)
- Coordinates: 15°27′10″N 87°55′25″W

Map
- Location in Honduras

Runways
Direction	Length		Surface
Direction	m	ft	Surface
04/22	2,886	9,469	Concrete

Statistics (2024)
- Total Passengers: 1,345,926
- Source: Honduran AIP, SAN, GCM

Ramón Villeda Morales International Airport (IATA: SAP, ICAO: MHLM) — also known as La Mesa International Airport — is located 11 kilometres (7 mi) southeast of the city of San Pedro Sula, in the Cortés Department of Honduras.

The airport is named after Ramón Villeda Morales (1909–1971), who served as president of Honduras from 1957 to 1963. It is the busiest airport in Honduras, handling 1,270,997 passengers in 2023. The airport also reported handling over 20,000 international and domestic flights annually. The airport provides short connections to tourist attractions such as La Ceiba, and the Caribbean beaches of Roatán and Tela.

== History ==
The Ramón Villeda Morales International Airport was inaugurated in February 1965. This was because of the rapid growth of the population, and the difficulty for pilots to land at the old airport located in the Barandillas neighborhood in San Pedro Sula. In addition, a modernization of the air service was being carried out, and a new airport was necessary since the old airport had only a dirt runway and a small house that served as a terminal.

In 1997, the current passenger terminal was inaugurated, built in a new location to the old one inaugurated in 1965. The airport was damaged in 1998 by Hurricane Mitch.

In 2013, a remodeling of the passenger terminal began to improve the facilities and infrastructure of the airport. Air Europa started a route to Madrid using Airbus A330s in April 2017. This was Honduras's first direct link to Europe. The airport was damaged in 2020 by Hurricane Eta and Hurricane Iota, which submerged the airport, causing humanitarian flights to the country to be delayed. In August 2023, SAN (Servicio Aeroportuario Nacional) started a large remodeling of the airport. The project will cost $15 million (370 million lempiras) and will include new additions, such as an additional gate, and many parts of the airport will be expanded.

== Facilities ==
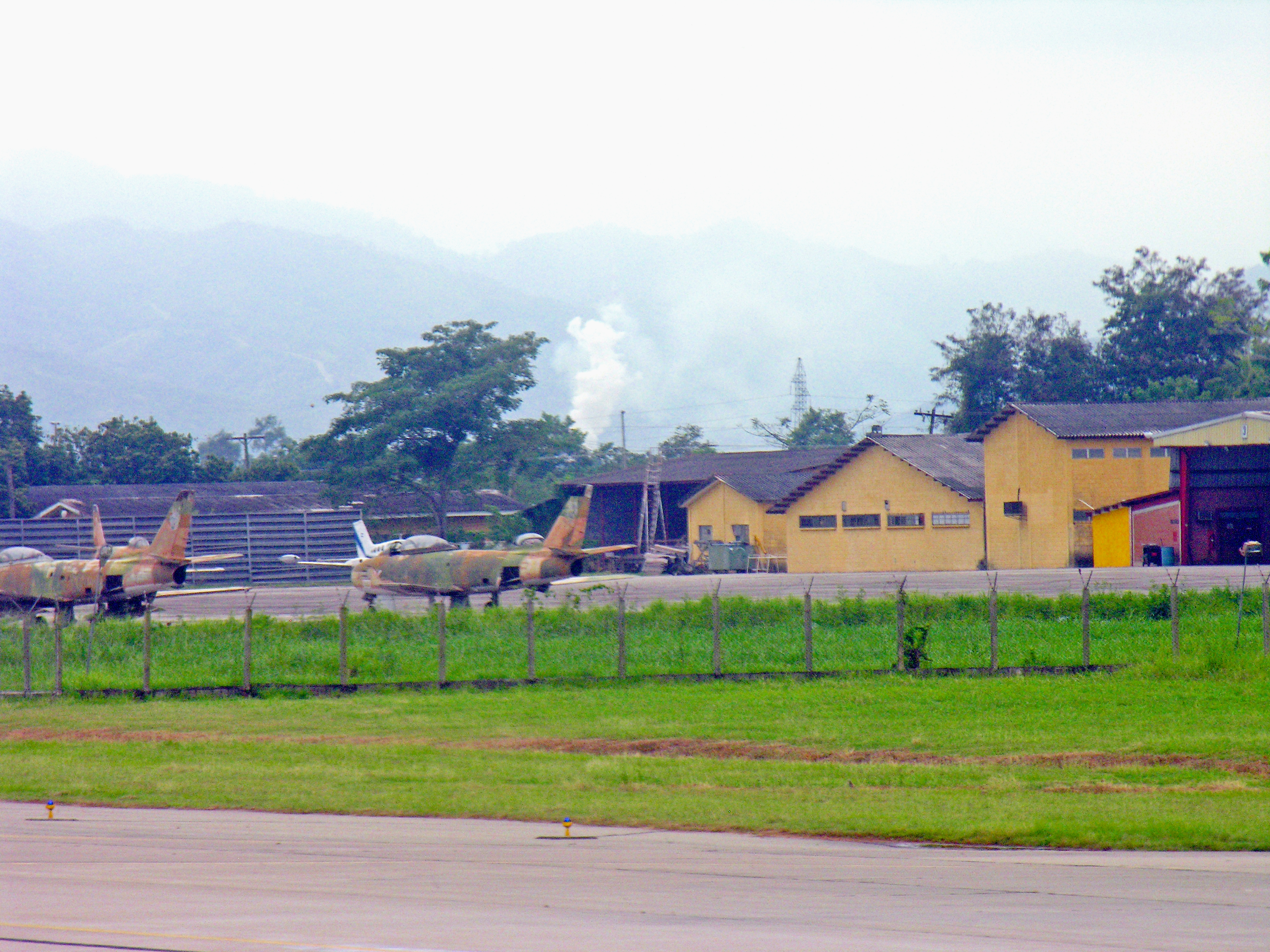
Military aircraft.

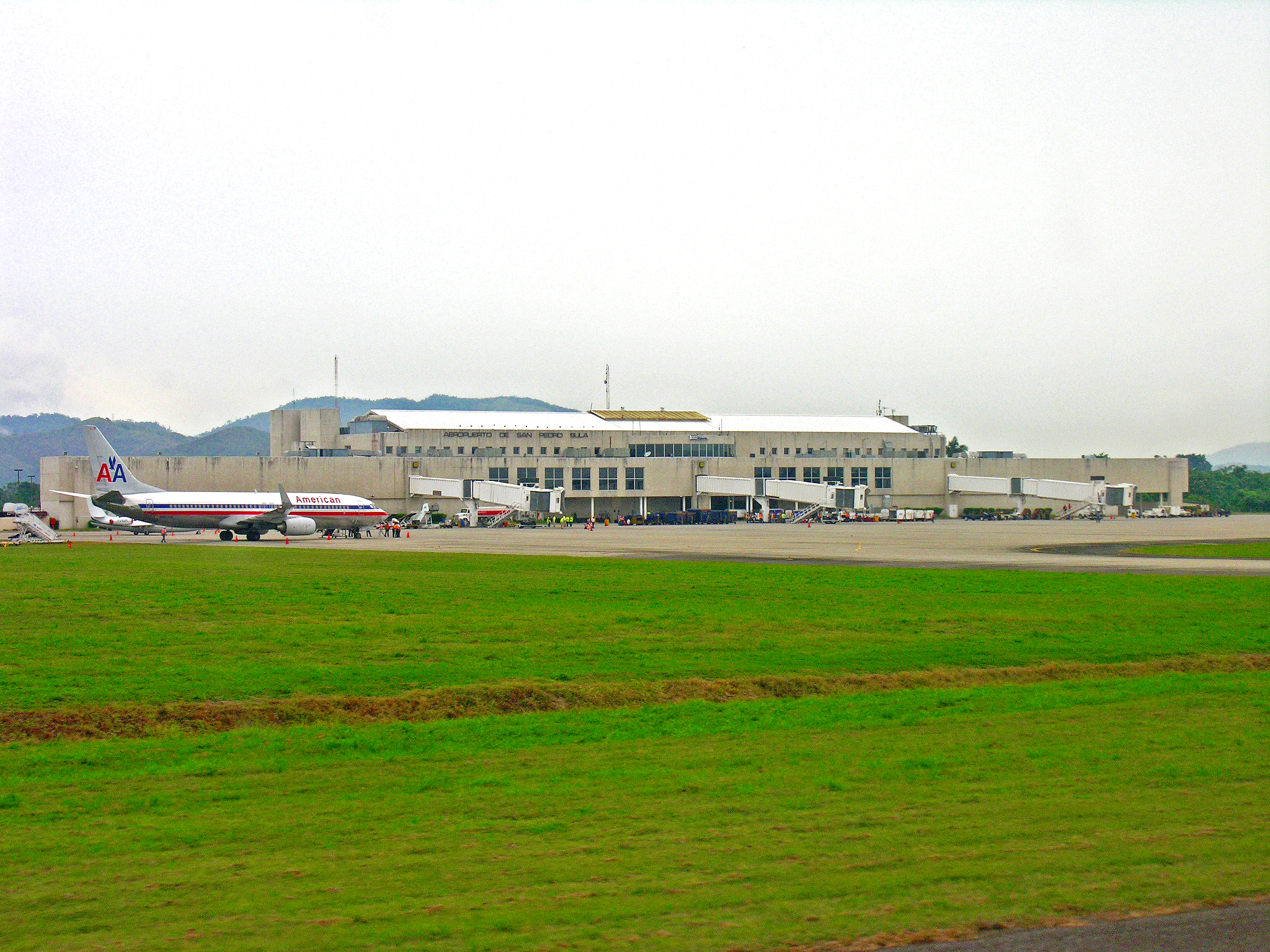
Airside of the airport.

The airport is at an elevation of 92 ft (28 m) above mean sea level. It has one runway with a concrete surface measuring 2,886 m × 46 m (9,469 ft × 151 ft).

== Airlines and destinations ==
=== Passenger ===
Airlines	Destinations
Aerolineas Sosa	La Ceiba, Roatán
Aeroméxico Connect	Mexico City-Benito Juarez
Air Europa	Madrid
American Airlines	Miami
Avianca El Salvador	San Salvador
CM Airlines	Guatemala City, Roatán, Tegucigalpa
Copa Airlines	Panama City-Tocumen
Delta Air Lines	Atlanta
Frontier Airlines	Orlando,Miami,Houston-Intercontinental
JetBlue	Fort Lauderdale
TAG Airlines	Guatemala City
Tropic Air	Belize City
United Airlines	Houston-Intercontinental, Newark

== See also ==
- Transport in Honduras
- List of airports in Honduras
