= List of Let L-410 Turbolet operators =

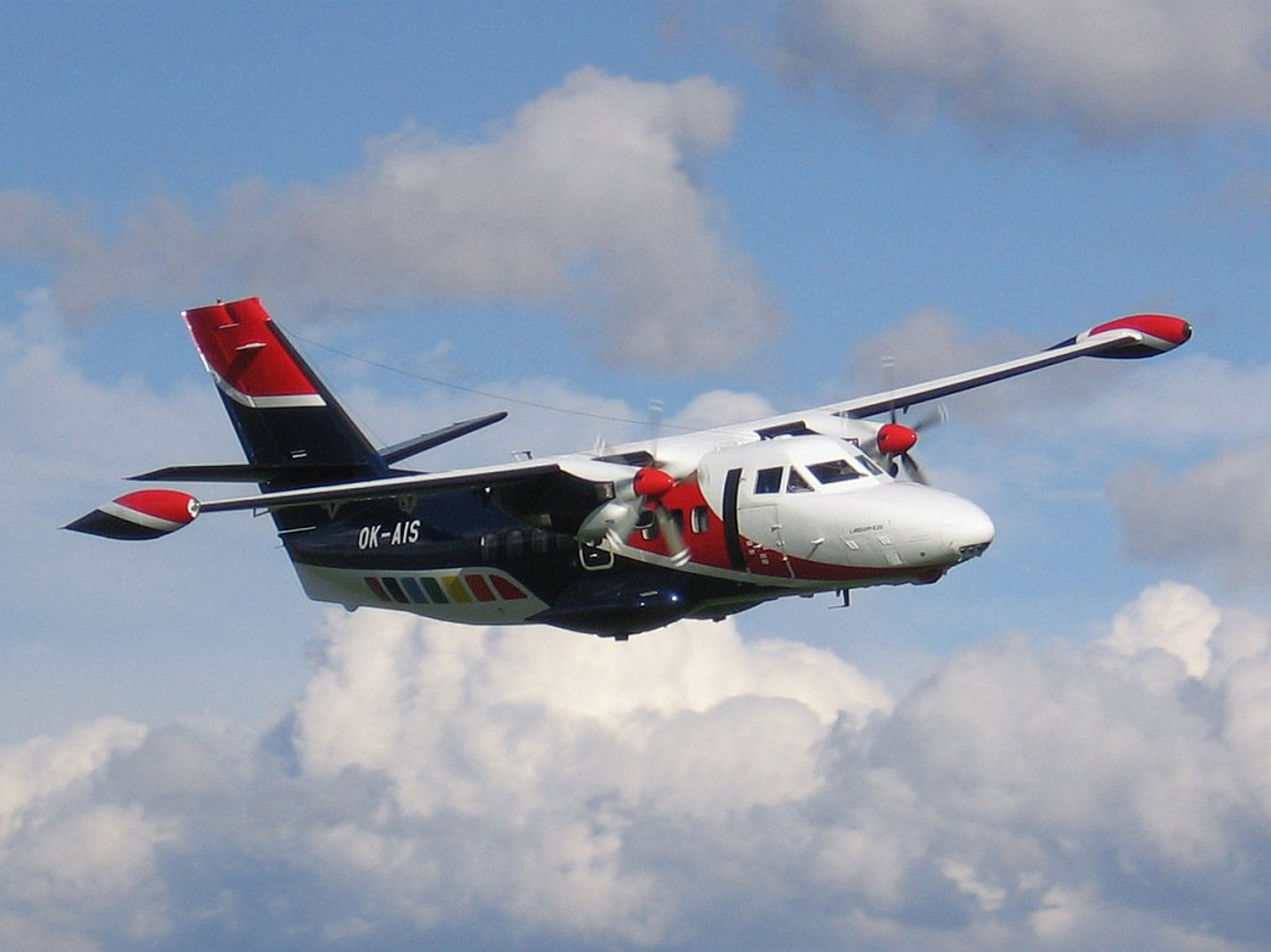
Let L-410 Turbolet

Many Let L-410 Turbolets were delivered to the former Soviet Union and ex-Soviet states and stayed there and in Russia, but some have been also sold to airlines in Asia, Africa, Central America, and South America. Forty aircraft are in use throughout Europe for commercial operation or skydiving.

== Current civilian operators ==
Algeria
- Air Express Algeria

Bosnia and Herzegovina

- Icar Air

Bulgaria

- Heli Air Services

Chile

- Aerocord

Colombia

- Searca

Czech Republic

- Silver Air
- Van Air Europe

Democratic Republic of the Congo

- Kin Avia

Georgia

- Vanilla Sky

India

- Luwang Air

Indonesia

- Susi Air

Lithuania

- TransAviaBaltika

Nepal

- Summit Air

Philippines

- Sky Pasada

Russia

- Kazan Air Enterprise
- Khabarovsk Airlines
- Komiaviatrans
- KrasAvia
- Orenburzhye
- Petropavlovsk-Kamchatsky Air Enterprise
- 2nd Arkhangelsk United Aviation Division

Senegal

- Air Senegal

South Africa

- Solenta Aviation
- Air-Tec Global

Tanzania

- Air Excel

Uzbekistan

- Uzbekistan Airways

== Former civilian operators ==
Brazil

- NHT Linhas Aéreas (BRAVA Linhas Aéreas)
- Noar Linhas Aéreas
- TEAM Linhas Aéreas

Czech Republic

- Government of the Czech Republic

Czechoslovakia

- ABA Air
- Government of Czechoslovakia
- Slov-Air

France

- Air Guyane Express

Croatia

- Trade Air

East Germany

- Interflug

Haiti

- Tortug' Air

Honduras

- Aerolineas Sosa
- Atlantic Airlines de Honduras
- Central American Airways
- CM Airlines

Hungary

- Aviaexpress
- Farnair Hungary

Slovenia

- Government of Slovenia

Slovakia

- Government of Slovakia

India

- Archana Airways

South Africa

- Metavia Airlines

Soviet Union

- Aeroflot

Venezuela
Ukraine

- Rivne Universal Avia
- Private Companies in the Aviation Industries

== Current military operators ==
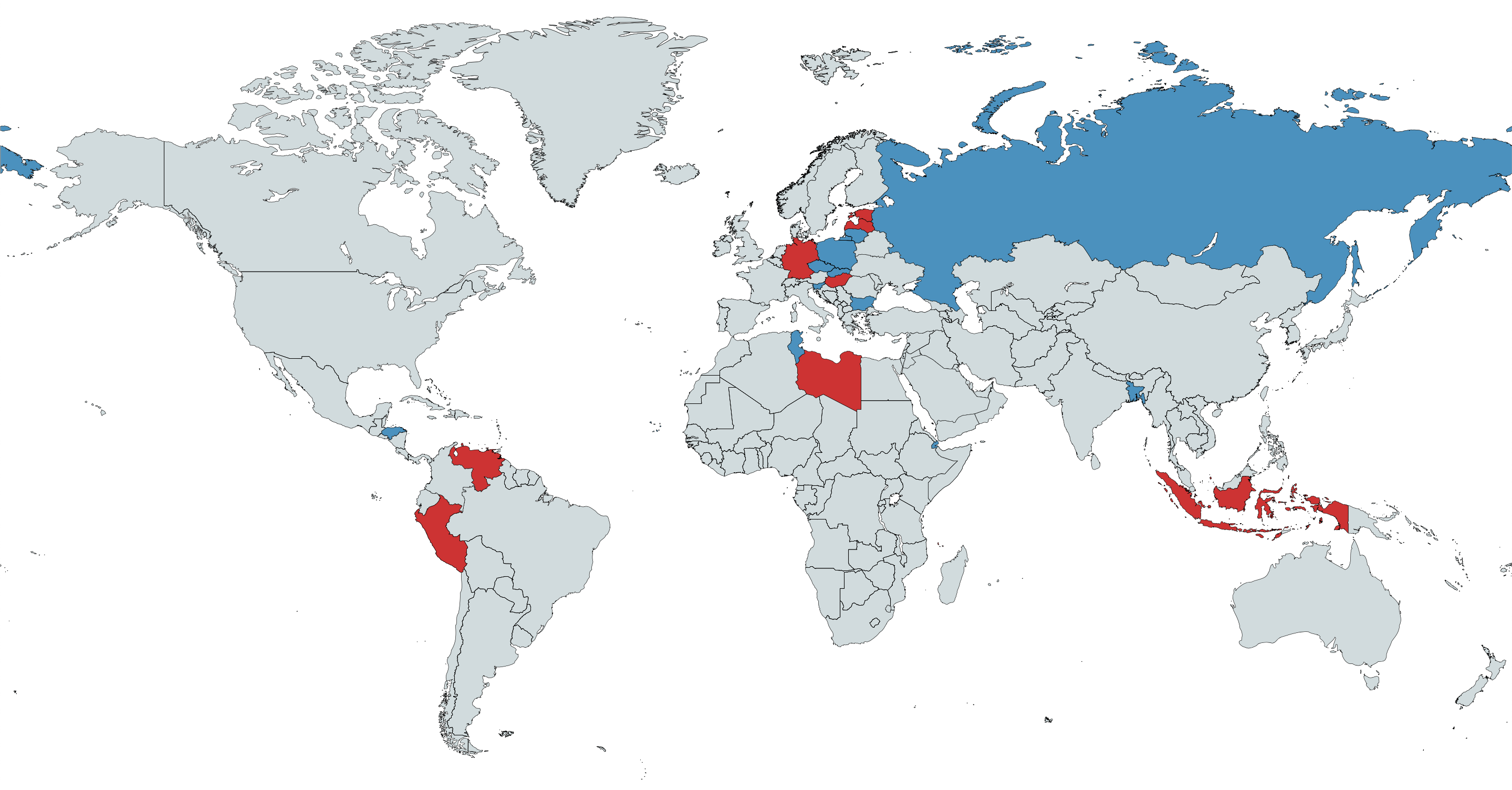
Map with current military operators of the L410 in blue and former military operators in red

Bangladesh

- Bangladesh Air Force currently operates 3 L-410UVP-E20

Bulgaria

- Bulgarian Air Force

Czech Republic

- Czech Air Force

Cape Verde

- Military of Cape Verde

Djibouti

- Djibouti Air Force

Honduras

- Honduras Air Force

Lithuania

- Lithuanian Air Force currently operates 2

Poland

- Polish border guard 2 L-410UVP-E20 with radar and optoelectronic equipment

Russia

- Russian Air Force

Slovakia

- Slovak Air Force

Slovenia

- Slovenian Air Force and Air Defence

Tunisia

- Tunisian Air Force

== Former military operators ==
Colombia

- Colombian Air Force
- Satena

Comoros

- Comoros Military Aviation Command

Czechoslovakia

- Czechoslovak Air Force

Estonia

- Estonian Border Guard Aviation Corps

East Germany

- East German Air Force

Germany

- Luftwaffe

Hungary

- Hungarian Air Force

Indonesia
Latvia

- Latvian Air Force

Libya

- Libyan Air Force

Peru

- Peruvian Army

Soviet Union

- Soviet Air Force
