= DGCA =

DGCA may refer to:

- DGCA (computing), file compression utility (also the name of its file format)
- Directorate General of Civil Aviation (Albania), now called the Albanian Civil Aviation Authority
- Directorate General of Civil Aviation (Bolivia)
- Directorate General for Civil Aviation (Croatia)
- Directorate General for Civil Aviation (France)
- Directorate General of Civil Aviation (India)
- Directorate General of Civil Aviation (Indonesia)
- Directorate General of Civil Aviation (Turkey)

== See also ==
- Directorate General of Civil Aviation (disambiguation)
