= Directorate General of Civil Aviation =

Directorate General of Civil Aviation or Directorate General of Civil Aeronautics can refer to:

- Directorate General of Civil Aviation (Chile), the national civil aviation authority of Chile
- Directorate General of Civil Aviation (Costa Rica), the national civil aviation authority of Costa Rica
- Directorate General of Civil Aviation (Ecuador), the national civil aviation authority of Ecuador
- Directorate General for Civil Aviation (France), the national civil aviation authority of France
- Directorate General of Civil Aviation (India), the national civil aviation authority of India
- Directorate General of Civil Aviation (Indonesia), the national civil aviation authority of Indonesia
- Directorate General of Civil Aeronautics (Mexico), the national civil aviation authority of Mexico
- Directorate General of Civil Aviation (Turkey), the national civil aviation authority of Turkey
- Dirección General de Aeronáutica Civil (disambiguation), Spanish for "Directorate General of Civil Aeronautics" and the name of the national civil aviation authority of various Spanish-speaking countries
- Dirección General de Aviación Civil (disambiguation), Spanish for "Directorate General of Civil Aviation" and the name of the national civil aviation authority of various Spanish-speaking countries

== See also ==
- DGCA (disambiguation)
- Directorate General for Civil Aviation (France)
- List of civil aviation authorities
