= Star Perú =

Peruvian airline

Aerolíneas Star Perú

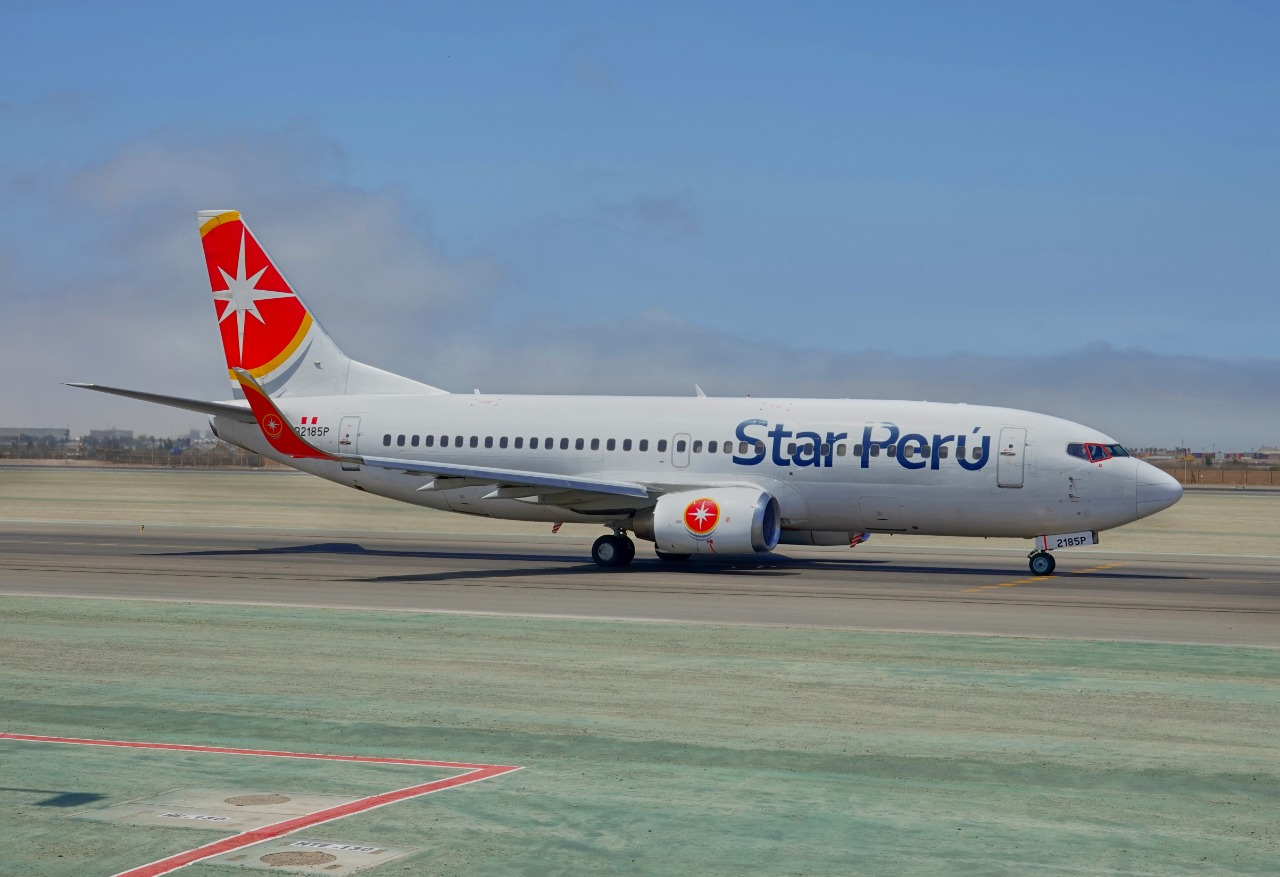
IATA	ICAO	Call sign
2I	SRU	STAR UP
- Founded: May 1, 1997
- Commenced operations: May 24, 1998
- Hubs: Jorge Chávez International Airport
- Secondary hubs: Iquitos International Airport
- Fleet size: 8
- Destinations: 9
- Parent company: Global Investment Platform
- Headquarters: Lima, Peru
- Key people: Carlos Carmona (CEO)
- Employees: 350
- Website: www.starperu.com

Aerolíneas Star Perú S.A., stylized as Star Perú, is a Peruvian airline, based at Jorge Chávez International Airport in Lima. It operates both passenger and cargo flights within Peru and South America. Founded in 1997, the carrier mostly flies domestic routes within Peru, along with international charter flights.

== History ==
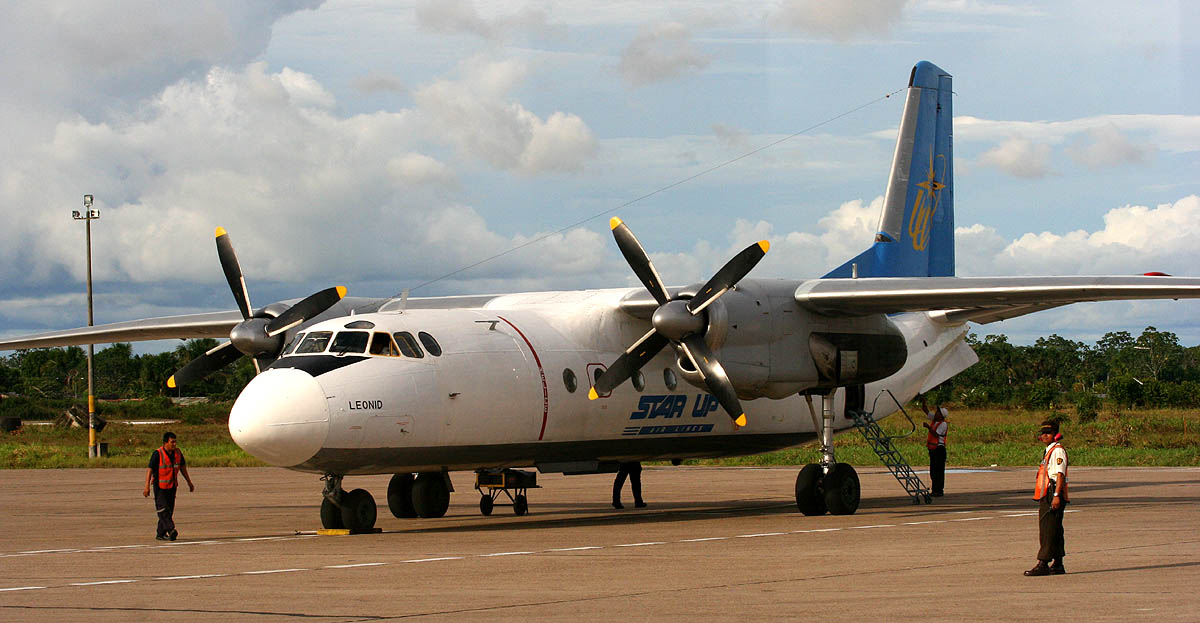
Former Star Up An-24 in Iquitos

The airline was established on May 1, 1997, as Servicio de Transporte Aéreo Regional by the chief executive, Valentin Kasyanov. Operations were inaugurated on May 24, 1998, with a single Antonov An-32 flying cargo and charter services around South America and Peru. The name would later be changed to Star Up and later Star Perú.

In late 2004, Star Perú began scheduled commercial domestic flights after having acquired a Boeing 737-200. Based on monthly growth of passenger traffic, Star Perú was the fastest-growing airline in Peru in 2005. Near the end of 2007, Star Perú offered nine destinations within Peru. Some of the new destinations in large cities such as Arequipa and Cusco would later be suspended.

In 2017 the Ministry of Transport and Communications granted Star Perú access to international flights. The airline was able to obtain a flight to Rio Branco in Brazil but the destination has since been terminated. Around the same time, Star Perú operated flights to Santiago via the Chilean airline, Latin American Wings (LAW). Star Perú continued to fly to and from Santiago until LAW suspended operations in 2018.

In May 2019, Star Perú ended the operation of its BAe 146 and Bombardier CRJ-200 aircraft. For the destinations on which the Boeing 737 cannot land in, two Dash 8 Q400s were acquired. Star Perú was set to merge with Peruvian Airlines after being acquired by the airline in May 2019. The merge was for both airlines to have a larger share of the Peruvian Market, which was largely controlled by foreign subsidiaries such as Sky Airline Peru and the largest, LATAM Perú. It worked very closely with Peruvian Airlines until it went bankrupt in October 2019. It was around this time that many Peruvian airlines such as the previously said Peruvian Airlines and LC Perú went bankrupt. Amidst the COVID-19 pandemic, Star Perú suspended all operations in 2020. Now, Star Perú continues its operations and have obtained new Boeing 737s. Since 2022, the airline began operating charter flights to various neighboring countries for Peruvian football clubs and the Peru national football team during their participation in international competitions and friendlies. It has become the main airline of transport for football club Alianza Universidad.

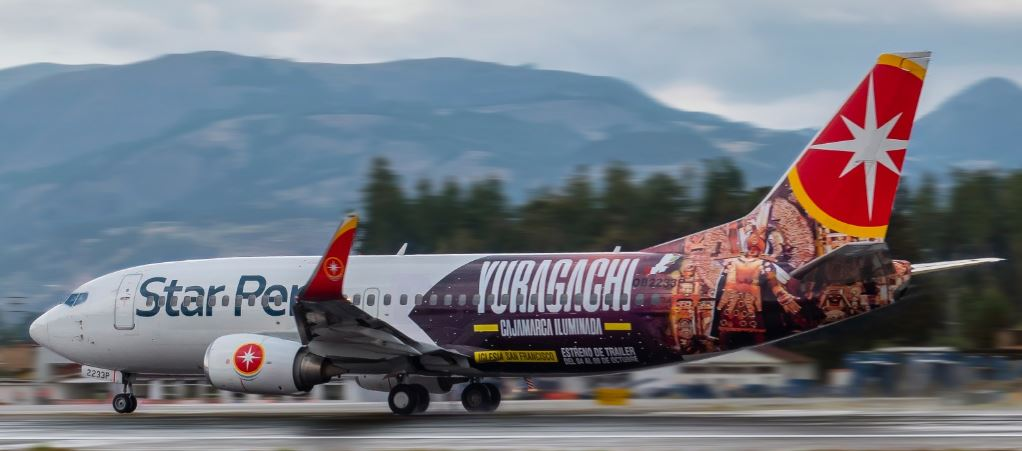
A Star Peru Boeing 737-300 taking off from Cajamarca

In 2023, Star Perú and Plus Ultra Líneas Aéreas signed an agreement to have the two airlines provide connecting flights from Madrid and Lima to Star Perú's domestic destinations, in addition with Copa Airlines from Panama City. In May 2024, Star Perú joined the Latin American and Caribbean Air Transport Association (ALTA). ALTA's mission is to make air transport in Latin America and the Caribbean safer and more environmentally friendly. Its 46 airlines in its network collaborate with each other to work towards this goal. Star Perú will have its ALTA Aviation Safety, Flight Ops & Training Summit in Lima on 18-20 June 2024. Around the same time, Avsoft partnered with the airline. Star Perú would receive access to Avsoft's Learning Management System for the delivery of new aircraft and more experienced pilots. The airline has since been working with Atsa Airlines to expand their route network.

In 2026, Star Perú's fleet of Q400's were authorized to do domestic cargo charter flights. The airline applied to the General Directorate of Civil Aeronautics to renew its permit to international destinations, gained in 2017, which provided unscheduled and charter routes to South America and the Caribbean. Star Perú submitted a list of six destinations, being, Bogotá, Punta Cana, Miami, Panama City, Quito, and Guayaquil, all from Lima. In addition, the airline applied for a destination to Piura, planning to connect the city with its possible international destinations in Ecuador. The airline plans to operate these routes with future Boeing 757, and 767's, along with their existing fleet.

== Destinations ==
As of 2026, Star Perú operates scheduled routes between the following airports:

Country	City	Airport	Notes	Refs
Colombia	Bogotá	El Dorado International Airport	Planned	
Dominican Republic	Punta Cana	Punta Cana International Airport	Planned	
Ecuador	Guayaquil	José Joaquín de Olmedo International Airport	Planned	
Ecuador	Quito	Mariscal Sucre International Airport	Planned	
Peru	Andahuaylas	Andahuaylas Airport	Terminated	
Peru	Andoas	Alférez FAP Alfredo Vladimir Sara Bauer Airport	Charter	
Peru	Arequipa	Rodríguez Ballón International Airport	Terminated	
Peru	Ayacucho	Coronel FAP Alfredo Mendívil Duarte Airport	Terminated	
Peru	Cajamarca	Mayor General FAP Armando Revoredo Iglesias Airport	style="background: #FFDFFF; color:black; vertical-align: middle; text-align: center; " class="dropped table-dropped"|Terminated	
Peru	Chachapoyas	Chachapoyas Airport	Terminated	
Peru	Chiclayo	FAP Captain José Abelardo Quiñones González International Airport		
Peru	Cusco	Alejandro Velasco Astete International Airport	Terminated	
Peru	Huánuco	Alférez FAP David Figueroa Fernandini Airport		
Peru	Ilo	Ilo Airport	Terminated	
Peru	Iquitos	Coronel FAP Francisco Secada Vignetta International Airport	Hub	
Peru	Juliaca	Inca Manco Cápac International Airport	Terminated	
Peru	Las Malvinas	Las Malvinas Airport	Charter	
Peru	Lima	Jorge Chávez International Airport	Hub	
Peru	Pisco	Capitán FAP Renán Elías Olivera Airport	Terminated	
Peru	Piura	PAF Captain Guillermo Concha Iberico International Airport	Planned	
Peru	Pucallpa	FAP Captain David Abensur Rengifo International Airport		
Peru	Puerto Maldonado	Padre Aldamiz International Airport	Terminated	
Peru	Talara	Capitán FAP Víctor Montes Arias International Airport	Terminated	
Peru	Tarapoto	Cadete FAP Guillermo del Castillo Paredes Airport		
Peru	Tumbes	FAP Captain Pedro Canga Rodríguez Airport	Terminated	
United States	Miami	Miami International Airport	Planned	

=== Codeshare agreements ===
Star Perú has codeshare agreements with the following airlines:

- Avianca
- Copa Airlines
- Plus Ultra Líneas Aéreas

== Fleet ==
=== Current fleet ===
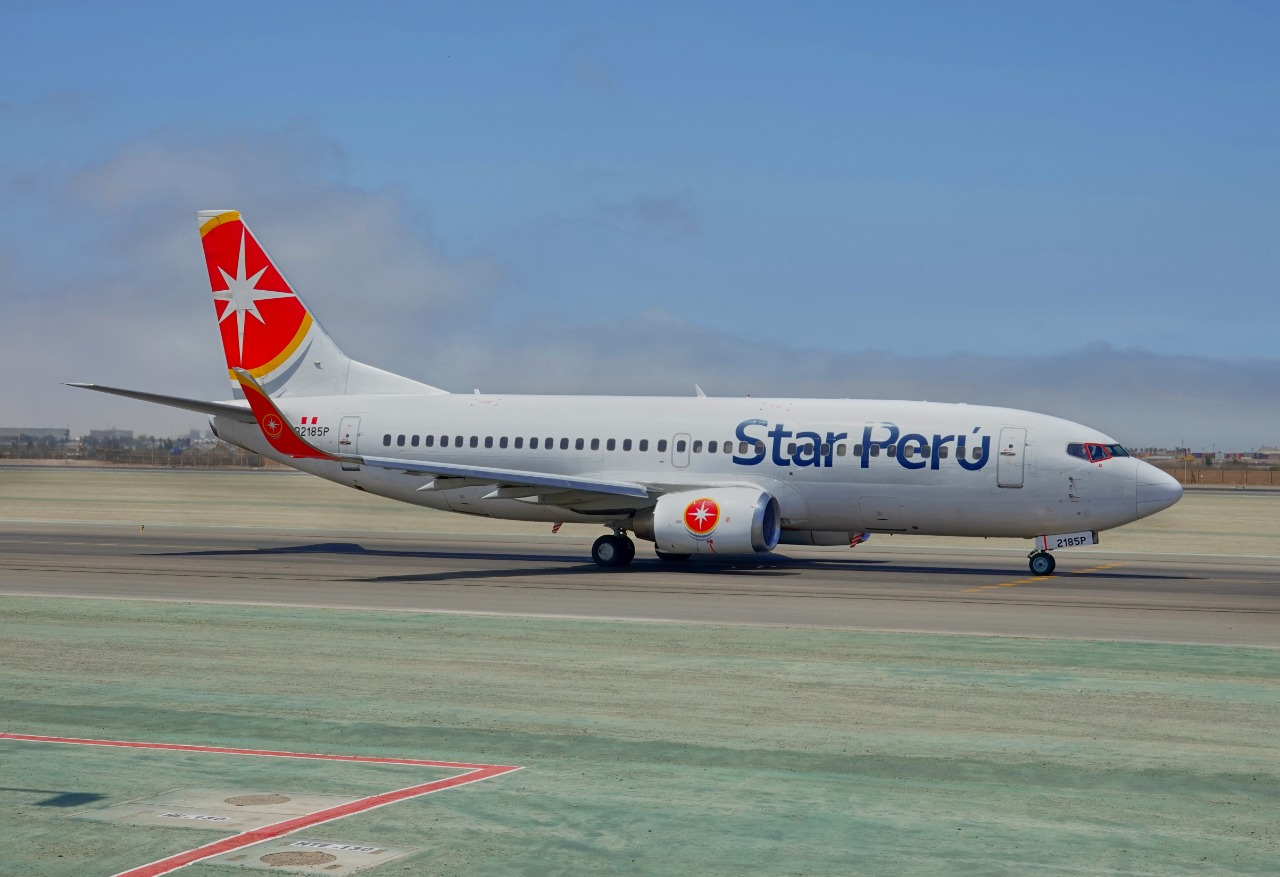
Star Perú Boeing 737-300 at Jorge Chávez International Airport

As of August 2026, Star Perú operates the following aircraft:

Star Perú fleet
Aircraft	In service	Orders	Passengers	Notes
Boeing 737-300	6	—	143	
De Havilland Canada Dash 8-400	2	—	76	
Total	8	—		

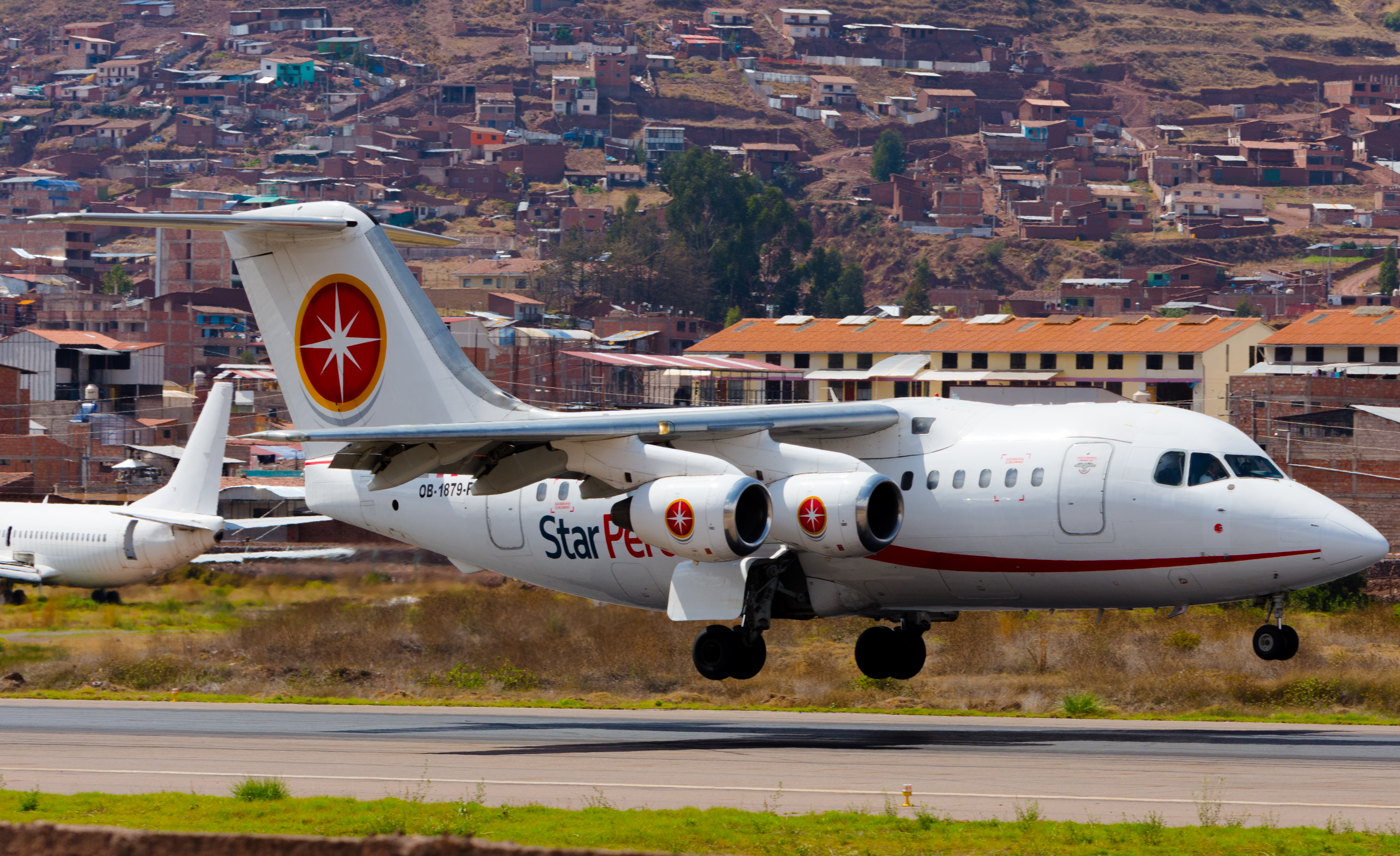
Former Star Perú BAe 146

== Accidents and incidents ==
- On 24 July 2023, Star Peru flight 2I-3143, a Boeing 737-300 had taken off from Jorge Chávez International Airport and was approaching Cadete FAP Guillermo del Castillo Paredes Airport. The crew reported engine failure on one of their engines. Passengers were instructed to brace for impact and the aircraft made a safe landing at the airport. The plane proceeded to stay at the airport for 9 more hours and delayed the flight by 8 hours. None of the 144 passengers were injured.

== See also ==
- List of airlines of Peru
