= DGAC =

DGAC can refer to:

- Dirección General de Aviación Civil (disambiguation) (various organizations)
- Dirección General de Aeronáutica Civil (disambiguation) (various organizations)
- Directorate General for Civil Aviation (France)
- Directorate General of Civil Aviation (Turkey)
- Directorate General of Civil Aviation (Portugal), now National Authority of Civil Aviation of Portugal
- Dietary Guidelines Advisory Committee (USA)
