= Jaén Airport =

Jaén Airport Shumba Airport
- IATA: JAE; ICAO: SPJE

Summary
- Airport type: Public
- Owner/Operator: CORPAC S.A.
- Serves: Jaén, Cajamarca, Peru
- Elevation AMSL: 2,477 ft (755 m)
- Coordinates: 5°35′35″S 78°46′25″W

Map
- Location of the airport in Peru

Runways
Direction	Length		Surface
Direction	m	ft	Surface
16/34	2,400	7,874	Asphalt, concrete
- Sources: CORPAC WAD WAC Google Maps

Jaén Airport (Spanish: Aeropuerto de Jaén) also known as Shumba Airport (Spanish: Aeropuerto de Shumba) (IATA: JAE, ICAO: SPJE) is an airport serving Jaén, the capital of Jaén Province in the Cajamarca Region of Peru. It is owned and operated by CORPAC S.A.

The airport is 14 kilometres (8.7 mi) north of the city. There is rising terrain to the east.

== Airlines and destinations ==
CORPAC, the organization that operates various airports in Peru, has suspended operations into Jaén multiple times since 2023 for runway repairs. After more than two years of suspended operations, the airport resumed activity in October 2025.

Airlines	Destinations
LATAM Perú	Lima

== See also ==
- Transport in Peru
- List of airports in Peru
