= Dirección General de Aeronáutica Civil =

Dirección General de Aeronáutica Civil (Spanish for "Directorate General of Civil Aeronautics") may refer to:

- Dirección General de Aeronáutica Civil (Bolivia)
- Dirección General de Aeronáutica Civil (Chile)
- Dirección General de Aeronáutica Civil (Guatemala)
- Dirección General de Aeronáutica Civil (Honduras)
- Dirección General de Aeronáutica Civil (Mexico)
- Dirección General de Aeronáutica Civil (Paraguay)

== See also ==
- Dirección General de Aviación Civil (disambiguation)
- Directorate General of Civil Aviation (disambiguation)
