= Jorge Chávez International Airport =

Main airport serving Lima, Peru; located in Callao

Jorge Chávez International Airport Aeropuerto Internacional Jorge Chávez
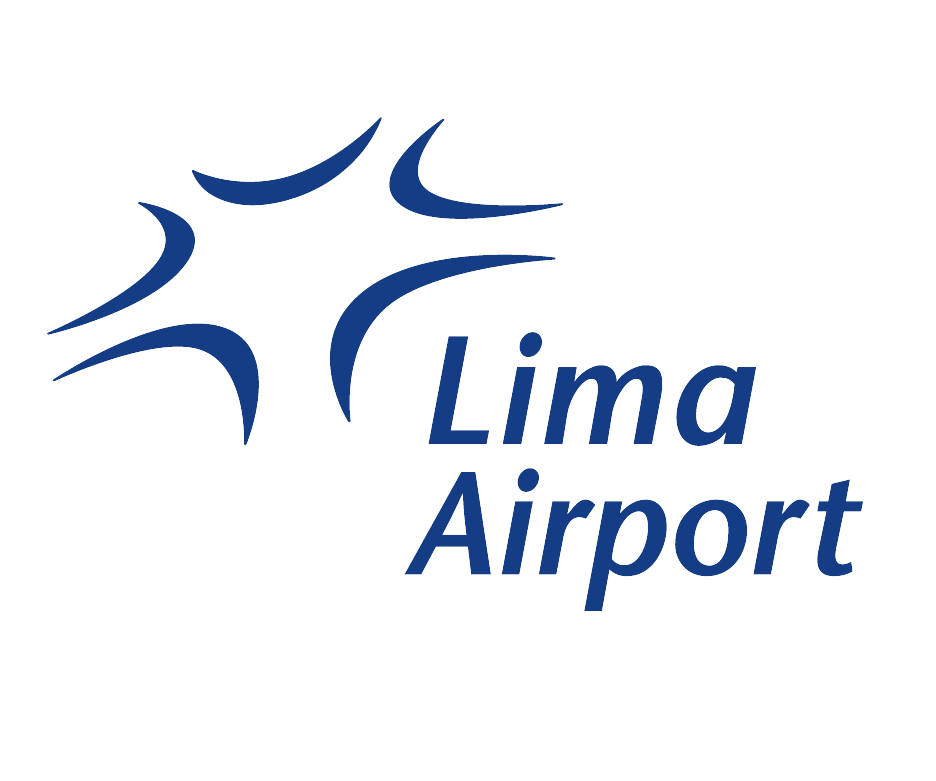

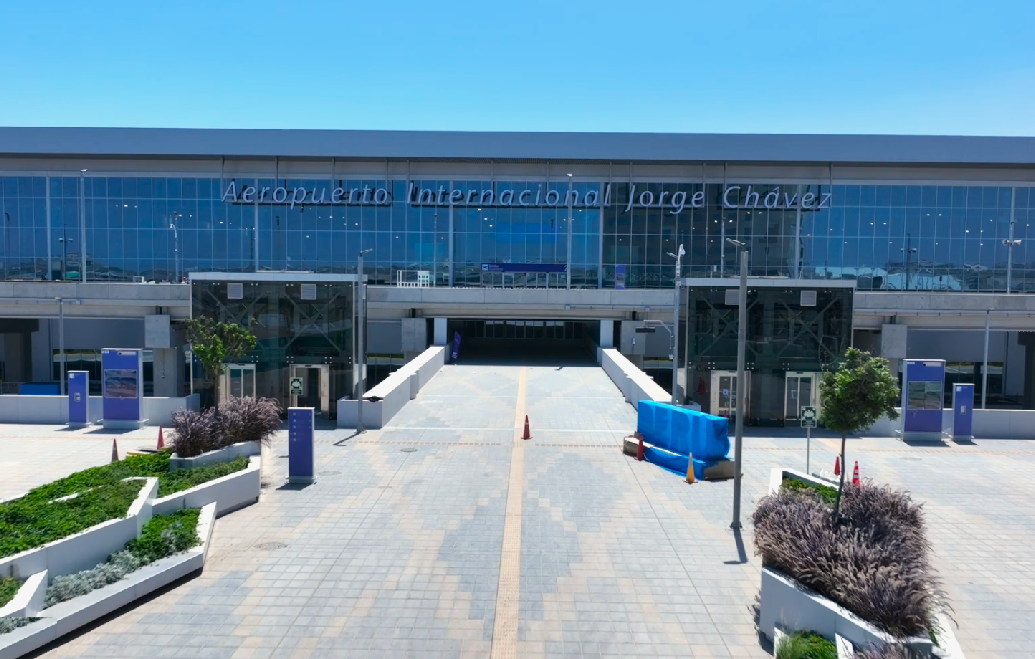
- IATA: LIM; ICAO: SPJC

Summary
- Airport type: Public
- Owner: Fraport
- Operator: Lima Airport Partners
- Serves: Lima metropolitan area
- Location: Callao, Peru
- Opened: 29 October 1960; 66 years ago
- Hub for: Atsa Airlines; JetSmart Perú; LATAM Perú; Sky Airline Peru; Star Perú
- Focus city for: Aerosucre
- Elevation AMSL: 34 m (112 ft)
- Coordinates: 12°01′19″S 077°06′52″W
- Website: www.lima-airport.com

Map
- Location of airport in Lima LIM/SPJC (Peru)

Runways
Direction	Length		Surface
Direction	m	ft	Surface
16L/34R	3,507	11,506	Asphalt
16R/34L	3,480	11,417	Asphalt

Statistics (2025)
- Total Passengers: 27,420,159
- Freight (tonnes): 267,000
- Aircraft movements: 199,000
- Source: Corporación Peruana de Aeropuertos y Aviación Comercial

Jorge Chávez International Airport (IATA: LIM, ICAO: SPJC, ~~SPIM~~) is the main international airport serving Lima, the capital of Peru. It is located in Callao, 11 kilometers (6.8 mi) northwest of the Historic Centre of Lima, the nation's capital city, and 17 kilometers (11 mi) from the district of Miraflores. In 2023, the airport served 22,876,785 passengers. Historically, the airport was the hub for Compañía de Aviación Faucett, which was the second oldest airline in the Americas, and Aeroperú, which served as Peru's flag carrier. Now it serves as a hub for many aviation companies. The airport was named after Peruvian aviator Jorge Chávez (1887–1910). It is among the busiest and largest airports in South America and the busiest in Peru.

In 2022, it entered the list of the 50 most important air hubs worldwide, occupying position number 47 after having been in position 58 in 2019 according to the international air statistics consultancy OAG. It is owned by the German transport company Fraport and operated by Lima Airport Partners.

On 3 April 2023, a second runway and a new control tower came into operation that will facilitate the growth of air movement. On 1 June 2025, a new passenger terminal was opened due to the surge in passenger traffic, replacing the old terminal. Initially, there were plans to convert the old terminal into a logistics center, although as of July 2025 the Peruvian government is evaluating re-opening it to increase capacity.

== History ==
=== Construction ===
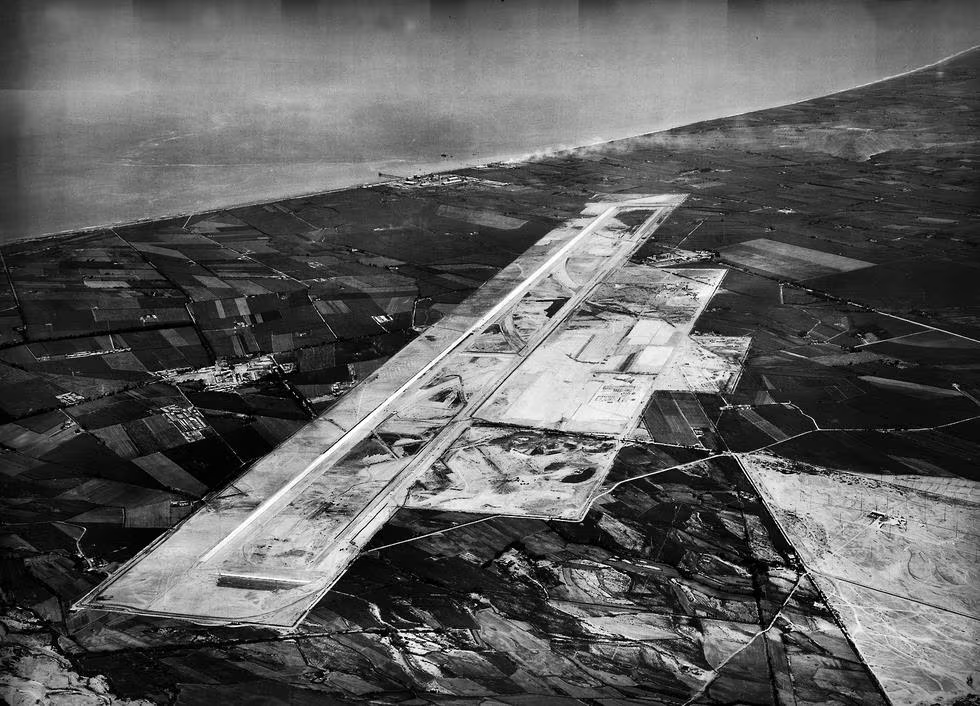
Under construction (1956)

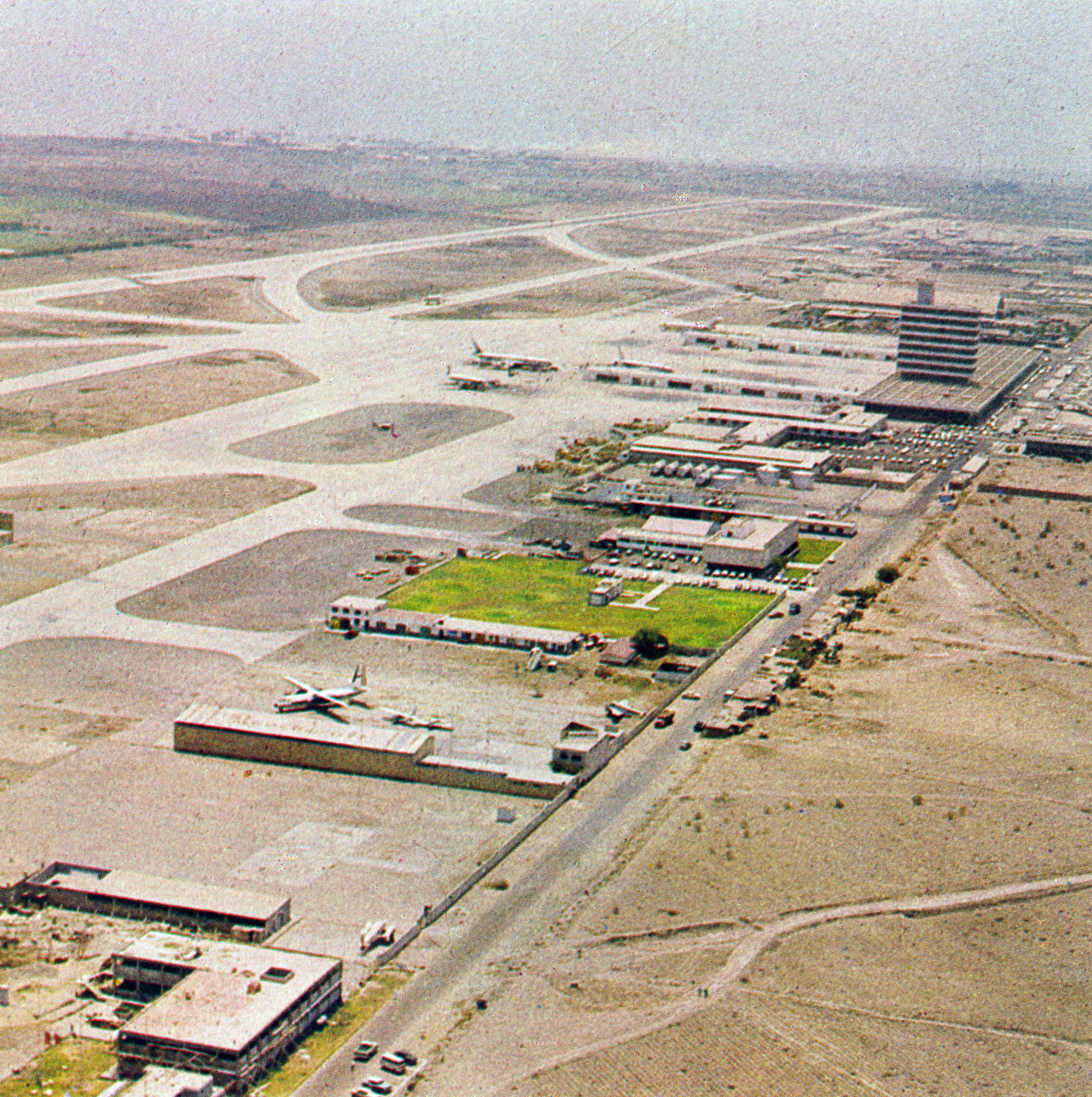
Lima Airport in 1960

The airport was conceived in 1960 to replace the old Limatambo International Airport, which was located in the San Isidro District, because it had been surrounded by new residential areas east of Lima. Without the modern facilities built later, the first international flight was carried out on 22 June 1960; and four months later, on 29 October 1960, President Manuel Prado Ugarteche inaugurated it with the name Lima International Airport.

In June 1965, the Lima-Callao airport was renamed the "Aeropuerto Internacional Jorge Chávez" after the famous Peruvian aviator, Jorge Chávez Dartnell. In December 1965, the terminal building was officially opened by President Fernando Belaúnde after 11 months of reconstruction.

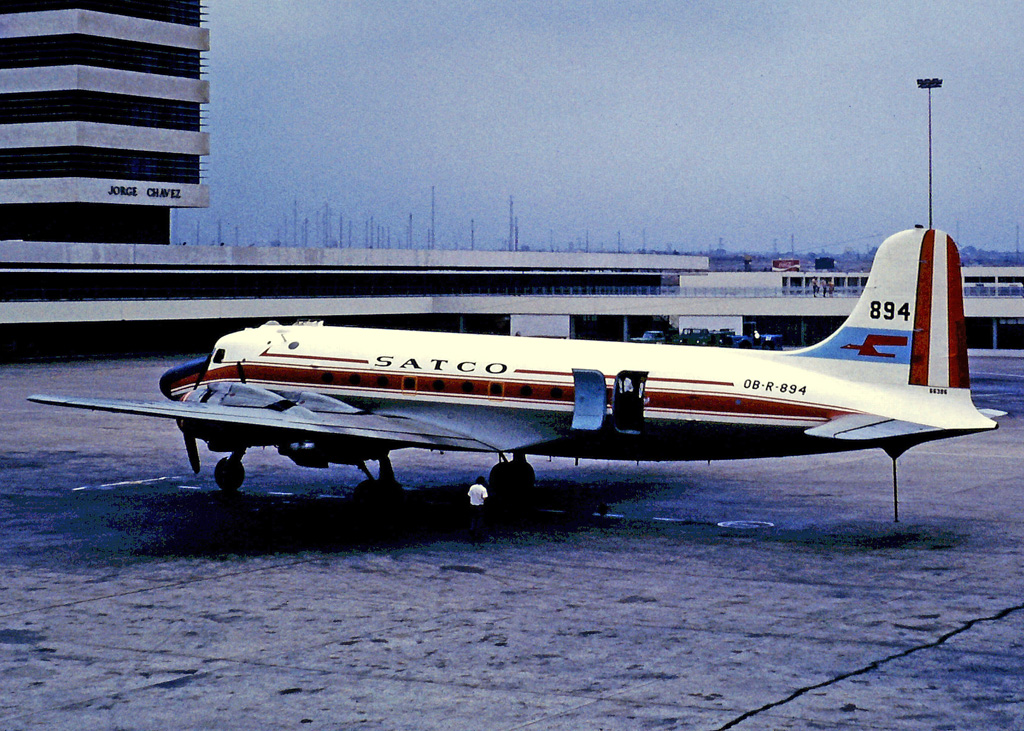
Lima Airport in 1972 with a SATCO Douglas DC-4 operating an internal flight

The architects Carlos Arana, Antenor Orrego, Juan Torres, Miguel Bao and Luis Vásquez won the competition to design the terminal building. After 11 months of reconstruction, it was officially reopened on December 30, 1965, by President Fernando Belaúnde. It was considered in its time as one of the most modern airports in Latin America due to the advanced and award-winning architecture of the passenger terminal. The airport did not receive any major changes to its infrastructure for the next 35 years, except for isolated remodeling and expansions in different sectors of the terminal.

=== Projects and expansion ===
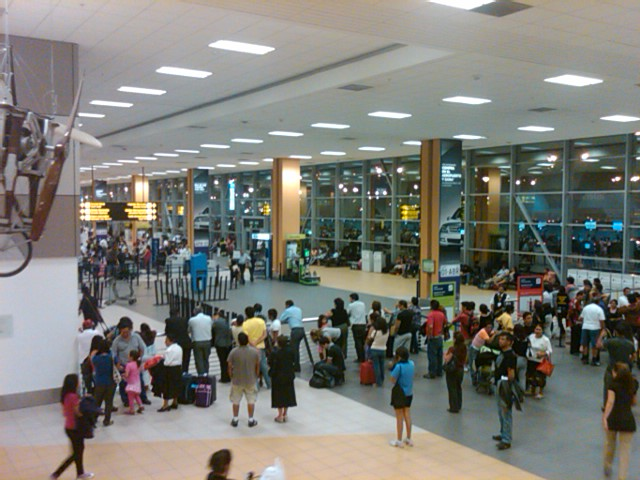
Check in area in the old terminal

By decision of the Government of Peru, in 2001, it was awarded a concession to the company Lima Airport Partners (LAP), a German-American consortium of Fraport, with the purpose of undertaking its expansion and comprehensive remodeling. As part of the process, the Peruvian congressional commission held talks with LAP. These conversations resulted in an agreement in which LAP committed to remodeling the airport facilities. The air traffic control is managed by the Peruvian Corporation of Airports and Commercial Aviation (CORPAC). The Peruvian government engaged Jaime Malagón, Jerome Jakubik, Paul Slocomb, and Víctor M. Marroquín of Baker and McKenzie international law firm, to oversee the changes.

In February 2005, the first phase of remodeling of the terminal was completed, which included the total renovation of the existing infrastructure, the construction of the Peru Plaza Shopping Center and the new concourse with 18 boarding gates, 7 of which have boarding bridges. In June 2007, a four-star hotel, Ramada Costa del Sol, opened at the airport, whose building is directly connected to the passenger terminal by an elevated pedestrian bridge.

In January 2009, the second phase of the terminal expansion was commenced. The terminal has 28 gates, 19 with boarding bridges. In August 2009, the LAP announced that in 2010, the airport would have a new category III instrument landing system to help with landing in foggy conditions. Arquitectonica, a Miami-based architectural office, and Lima Airport Partners planned a second terminal and expansion of the main terminal.

=== New terminal ===
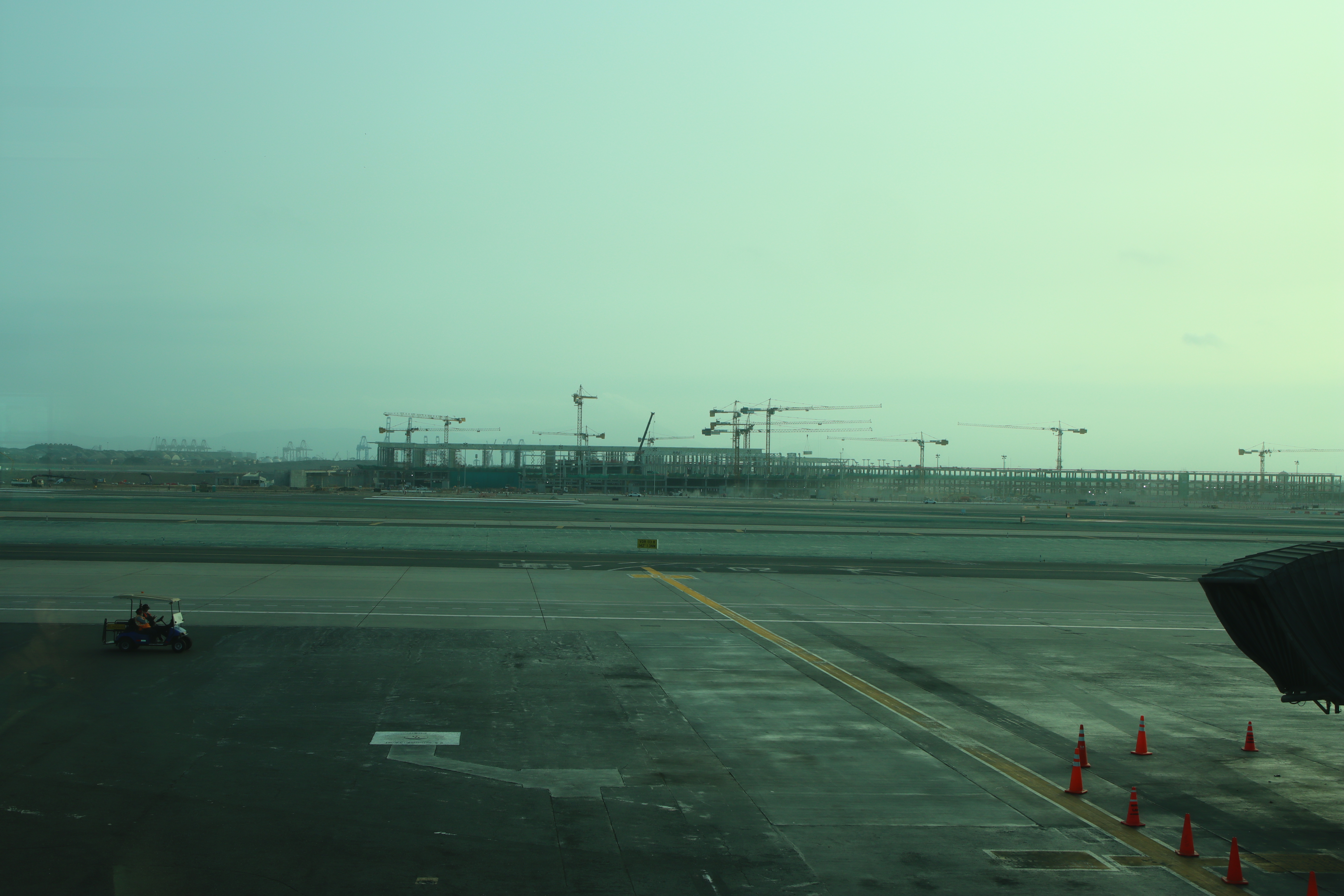
Construction of the new terminal in 2023

On 24 October 2018, the Peruvian state delivered all the land for the expansion and modernization of the Jorge Chavez airport to the airport operator "Lima Airport Partners". The estimated investment of US $1.2 billion includes the construction of a new runway, a control tower and a passenger terminal in addition to the existing one. On the other hand, the state will build a new bridge and highway on the current Santa Rosa Avenue that will connect directly with the "Costa Verde" highway, benefiting a lot of tourists and entrepreneurs who are only going to visit Miraflores and the south.

Works was to be completed in four years, by the beginning of the year 2023, and will allow the transit of 40 million passengers per year by 2030, an increase from the current 30 million passengers. Due to the COVID-19 pandemic, work was delayed but continued in 2021. The new terminal was expected to be completed on 30 March 2025, but was soon delayed numerous times due to defects in the terminal, temporary bridges, and that the airport did not receive its operators certificate yet.

==== Postponement of New Terminal Operations ====
As of March 2025, the expansion of Jorge Chávez International Airport has experienced significant developments and adjustments: The inauguration of the new passenger terminal, initially slated for 30 March 2025, has been postponed due to incomplete testing and pending safety verifications. Peru's Minister of Transport and Communications, Raúl Pérez-Reyes, indicated that essential tests, particularly concerning the fuel supply's safety systems, have not been finalized. Consequently, no new official opening date has been announced.

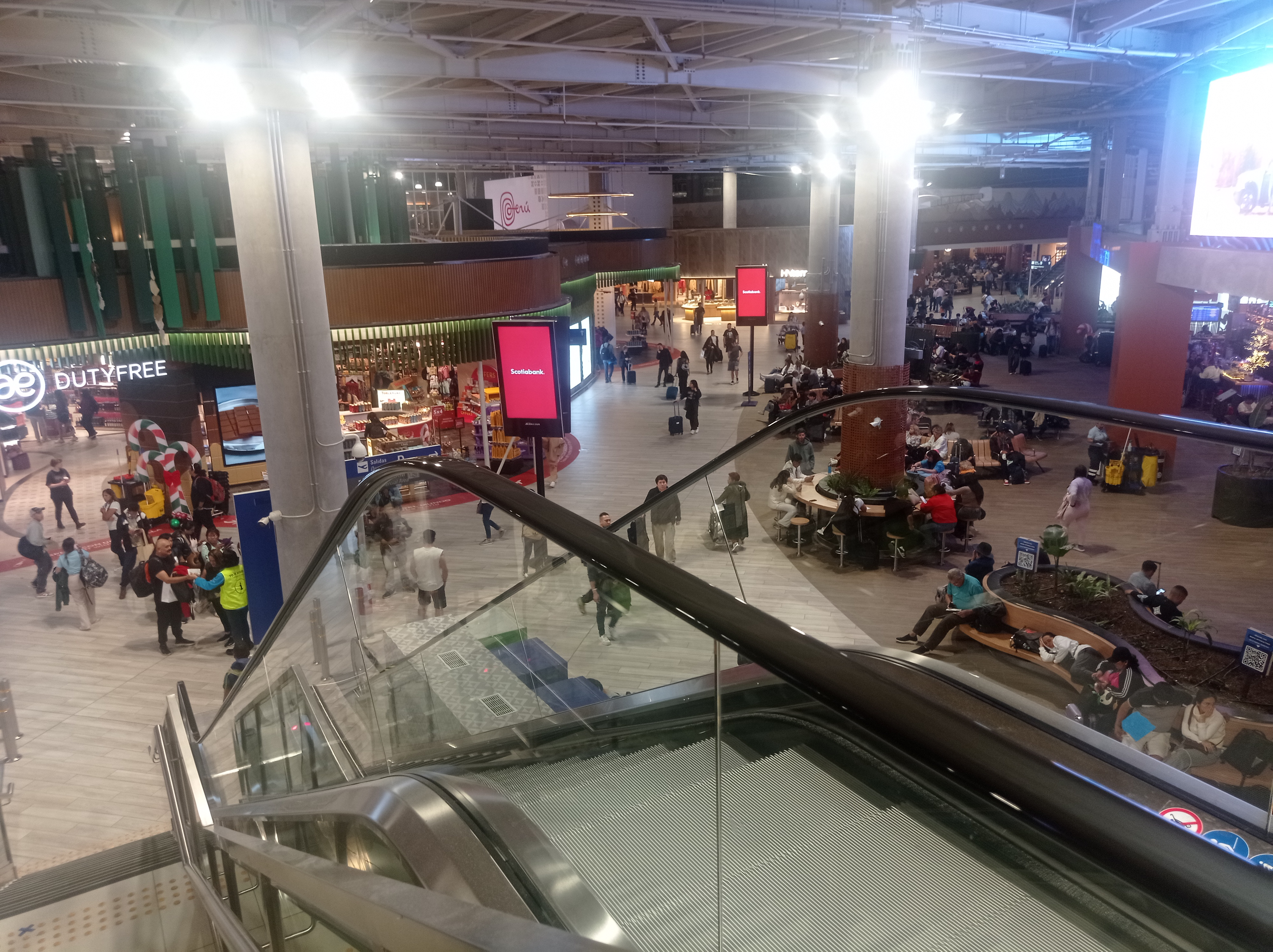
Duty free area of the new terminal

On 30 April 2025, the Minister of Transport and Communication has officially announced that the new terminal will be opened on 1 June 2025. Flights will be temporarily suspended in-between 31 May and 1 June in order to transfer to the new terminal. Lima Airport Partners revealed that the old terminal will be used as a medical center, offices, logistics and private aviation. There is also a possibility that the old terminal will be used as a second terminal if the new terminal has met its maximum capacity.

The Marcha Blanca, the process of using passengers to prepare for the opening of the new terminal, began on 15 May and will end 31 May, the day before the opening of the new airport. Five airlines participated in the process, which included Aerolíneas Argentinas, Air Europa, Arajet, Wingo and Volaris. The first passenger flight to the new terminal was conducted by Aerolíneas Argentinas. The new terminal was inaugurated by President Dina Boluarte on 30 May 2025. It officially began operations on 1 June 2025.

==== Criticism of the New Terminal ====
Before the terminal was even opened, news outlets and Peruvians complained about various factors regarding the new terminal. Most importantly, getting to and from the airport will be challenging as there is no highway, metro, or public buses that go to the airport. The only way to get there is across two temporarily built bridges that do not offer pedestrian footpaths. Most of the 17,000 airport workers arrive on foot and will have to find an alternative means of transit to and from the airport. Additionally, the area surrounding the airport is "crime ridden" and during peak hours, traffic is "slow and congested" potentially leaving travelers to be unsafe.

== Facilities ==
=== Hotels ===
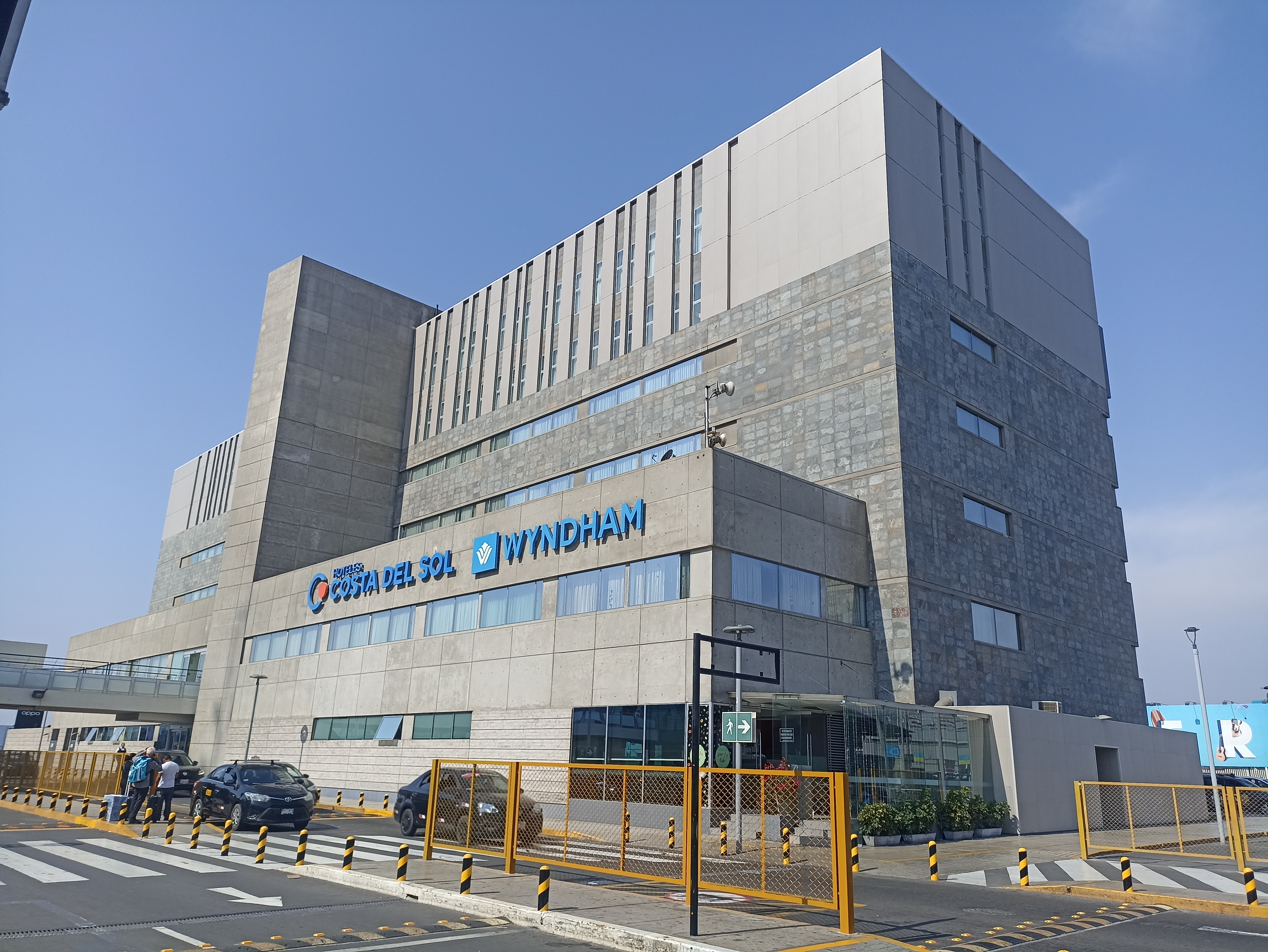
Hotel Costa del Sol located at the old terminal.

The airport hosts the Wyndham Grand Costa del Sol hotel, which is located in front of the new terminal by the central boulevard. The design of the hotel is inspired by the textile iconography of the Paracas culture, aligned with the concept of cultural identity promoted in the new airport infrastructure.

Other buildings will also be constructed along with the existing Costa del Sol hotel. The hotel was inaugurated in June 2025.

The old Wyndham Costa del Sol hotel is located at the old terminal, adjacent to the control tower and the arrivals exit. The hotel is built with noise canceling panels. The hotel was inaugurated on 12 June 2007. It will remain in operation after the new terminal is opened.

The Peru Plaza Shopping Center is located near the passenger terminal in the Grand Concourse area. The food court is located near the entrance of the passenger terminal on the second floor and is always open. There is also an ice cream vendor selling some special Peruvian flavours such as chirimoya and lúcuma.

=== VIP Lounges ===
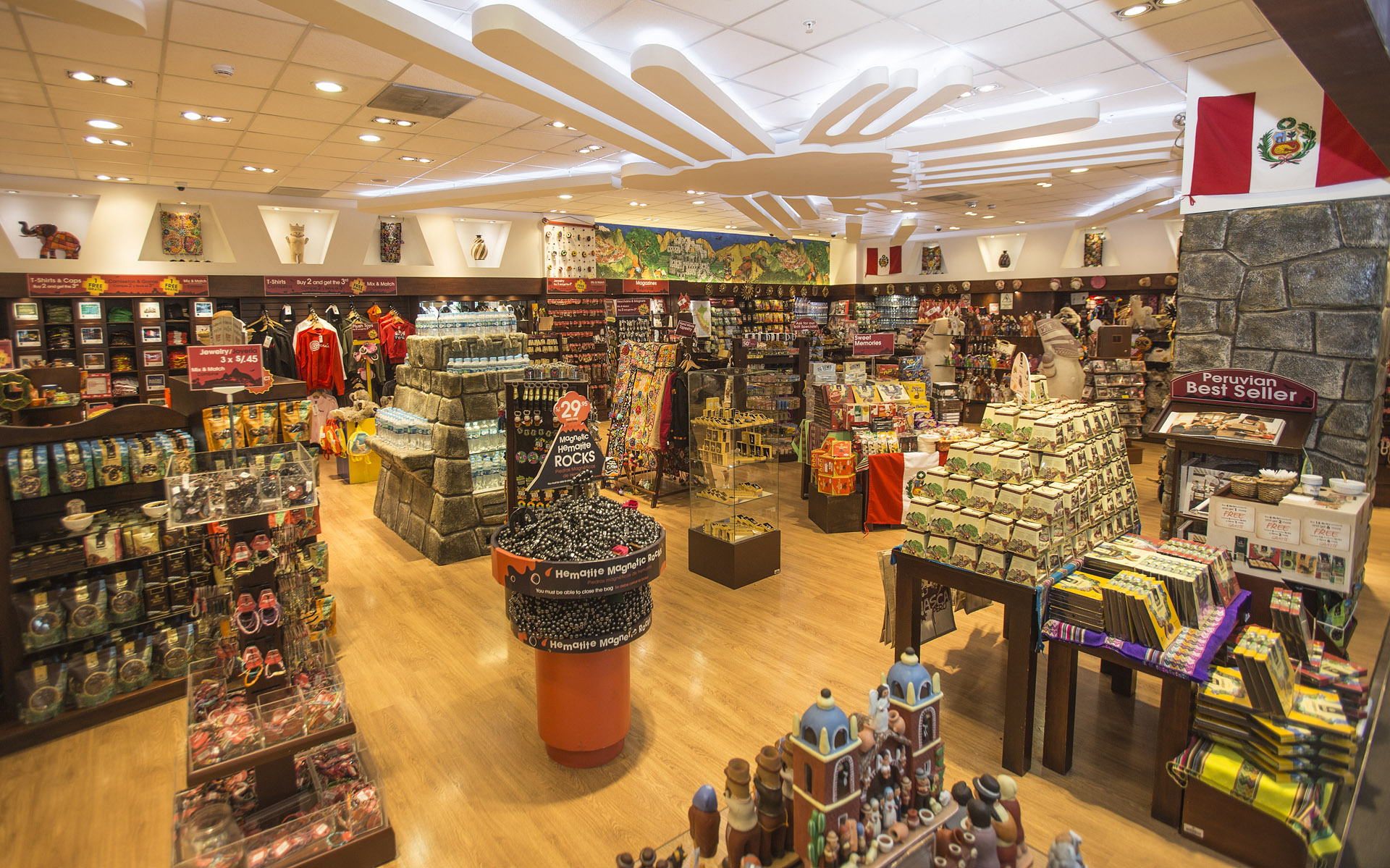
Britt Shop Peru in the old terminal

The airport has numerous premium lounges in the old departures terminal, such as VIP Peru. For passengers in first class, there is an exclusive salon near the gates, the VIP Club. Some lounges include, Salón VIP Perú, Salón VIP Club and Salón Sumaq VIP Lounge.

In 2010, for the second consecutive year, the Sumaq VIP Lounge, part of the international Priority Pass lounge chain, was named Lounge of the Year worldwide, based on a vote made by the chain's users.

=== Tourist information ===
For tourist information, Iperú modules are available, located at national and international arrivals and national and international departures. There, free information material is distributed as well as information about the main tourist destinations in Peru.

=== Cargo ===
As part of the Jorge Chávez International Airport Master Plan, Lima Airport Partners inaugurated the new Air Cargo and Mail Center facilities in 2007. Additionally, the company Frío Aéreo inaugurated a refrigerated cargo warehouse, which handles perishable exports. Later, a complex called Lima Cargo City was built and annexed, an important new logistics center adjacent to the airport, which required an investment of 35 million dollars and was designed to house the main air cargo operators. On 12 May 2009 Lima Cargo City was opened.

== Airlines and destinations ==
=== Passenger ===
Airlines	Destinations
Aerolíneas Argentinas	Buenos Aires–Aeroparque
Aeroméxico	Mexico City–Benito Juárez
Aeroregional	Quito
Air Canada	Montréal–Trudeau; Seasonal: Toronto–Pearson
Air Europa	Madrid
Air France	Paris–Charles de Gaulle
Air Transat	Montréal–Trudeau, Toronto–Pearson
American Airlines	Miami
Arajet	Punta Cana, Santo Domingo–Las Américas
ATSA Airlines	Andahuaylas, Atalaya, Chachapoyas, Huánuco, Jaén, Mazamari, Tingo María
Avianca	Bogotá
Avianca El Salvador	San Salvador
Boliviana de Aviación	La Paz, Santa Cruz de la Sierra–Viru Viru
Copa Airlines	Panama City–Tocumen
Delta Air Lines	Atlanta; Seasonal: Salt Lake City
Iberia	Madrid
JetSmart Argentina	Buenos Aires–Aeroparque, Buenos Aires–Ezeiza
JetSmart Chile	Santiago de Chile
JetSmart Perú	Arequipa, Cajamarca, Cartagena, Chiclayo, Cusco, Medellín–JMC, Piura, Quito, Santiago de Chile, Talara, Tarapoto, Trujillo
KLM	Amsterdam
LATAM Brasil	São Paulo–Guarulhos
LATAM Chile	Antofagasta (ends 1 April 2027), Los Angeles, Santiago de Chile
LATAM Colombia	Bogotá
LATAM Ecuador	Buenos Aires–Ezeiza, Guayaquil
LATAM Paraguay	Asunción
LATAM Perú	Arequipa, Aruba, Atlanta, Ayacucho, Bogotá, Brasília, Buenos Aires–Aeroparque, Buenos Aires–Ezeiza, Cajamarca, Cancún, Cartagena, Chiclayo, Cordoba (AR), Curitiba, Cusco, Guayaquil, Huaraz, Iquitos, Jaén, Jauja, Juliaca, La Paz, Los Angeles, Madrid, Medellín–JMC,Mendoza, Mexico City–Benito Juárez, Miami, Montego Bay, Montevideo, New York–JFK, Porto Alegre, Pucallpa, Puerto Maldonado, Punta Cana, Quito, Rio de Janeiro–Galeão, Rosario, Salta, San José (CR), Santa Cruz de la Sierra–Viru Viru, Santiago de Chile, São Paulo–Guarulhos, Tacna, Talara, Tarapoto, Trujillo, Tumbes
Level	Barcelona
Sky Airline	Santiago de Chile
Sky Airline Peru	Arequipa, Ayacucho, Buenos Aires–Aeroparque, Buenos Aires–Ezeiza, Cusco, Iquitos, Jauja, Juliaca, Miami, Piura, Pucallpa, Punta Cana, Rio de Janeiro–Galeão (begins 28 December 2026), Santiago de Chile, São Paulo–Guarulhos, Tacna, Tarapoto, Trujillo, Tumbes,
Star Perú	Cajamarca, Chiclayo, Huánuco, Iquitos, Pucallpa, Tarapoto
United Airlines	Houston–Intercontinental, Newark (ends 27 March 2027)
Volaris	Mexico City–Benito Juárez

== Statistics ==
Annual statistics
Year	2022	2021	2020	2019	2018	2017	2016	2015	2014	2013	2012	2011	2010	2009	2008
Passenger traffic	18,619,536	10,819,010	7,017,414	23,578,600	23,659,196	22,046,042	19,286,158	17,575,919	16,170,035	14,908,772	13,330,290	11,904,553	10,278,493	8,786,973	8,285,688
YoY growth%	▲72.1%	▲54.17%	▼336%	▼0.004%	▲7.61%	▲14.07%	▲9.73%	▲8.69%	▲8.45%	▲11.84%	▲11.70%	▲15.82%	▲17.00%	▲6.0%	▲10.4%

=== Busiest routes ===
Busiest international routes from/to Lima (LIM) in January–December 2018
Rank	Airport	Passengers	Airline(s)
1	Santiago, Chile	▲1,654,378	Avianca Costa Rica, Avianca Perú, JetSmart, LATAM Chile, LATAM Perú, Sky Airline
2	Bogotá, Colombia	▲839,947	Avianca, Avianca Perú, LATAM Perú, Viva Air Colombia
3	Buenos Aires-Ezeiza, Argentina	▼883,845	Avianca Perú, Aerolíneas Argentinas, LATAM Argentina, LATAM Ecuador, LATAM Perú
4	Miami, United States	▼881,406	American Airlines, Avianca Perú, LATAM Perú
5	Madrid, Spain	▲663,714	Air Europa, Iberia, LATAM Perú, Plus Ultra Líneas Aéreas
6	Mexico City–Benito Juárez, Mexico	▲630,495	Aeroméxico, Avianca Perú, Interjet, LATAM Perú
7	Panama City-Tocumen, Panama	▲511,965	Copa Airlines
8	São Paulo-Guarulhos, Brazil	▲506,918	Avianca Perú, LATAM Brasil, LATAM Perú
9	Cancún, Mexico	▲421,325	Avianca Perú, LATAM Perú
10	Quito, Ecuador	▲399,307	Avianca Ecuador, LATAM Ecuador, LATAM Perú, TAME

== Transport ==
=== Bus and metro ===
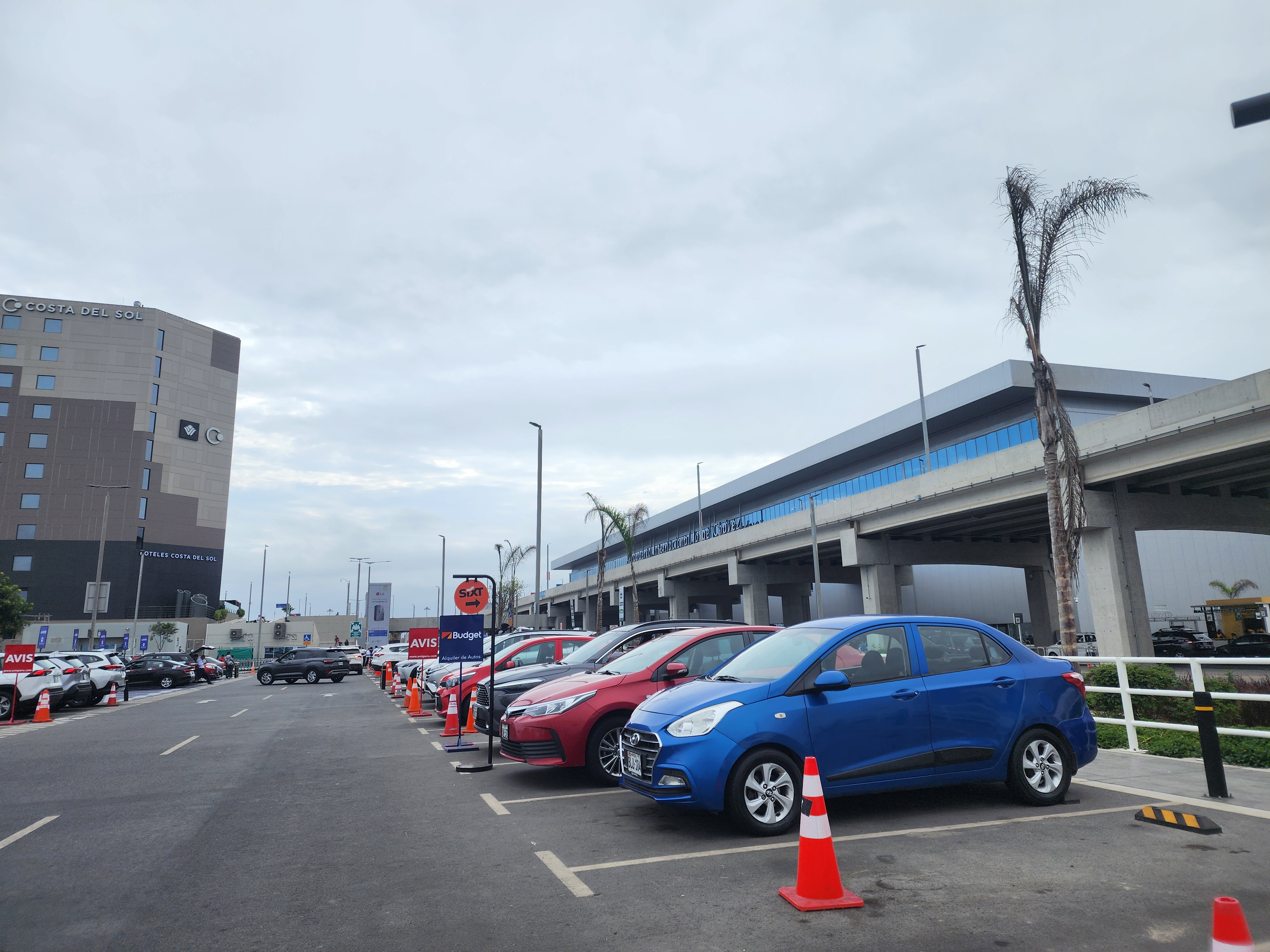
Parking area of the new terminal

Transportation between the airport and the city is provided by taxis, tour buses and vans. Airport Express Lima is the official bus of Jorge Chávez Airport. Line 2 and Line 4 of the Lima Metro are currently under construction. Some companies of taxis and buses offer services to visit the city, some of them transit through the avenues: Faucett, Linea Amarilla, Tomás Valle, De La Marina, Colonial and Costa Verde. Some go north, east, to the historic center and the Financial Center; and others towards Miraflores and the south area like Pachacamac and Surco.

=== Taxi ===
For safety reasons, it is advisable to only take taxis from companies that are located in the national or international arrivals area. You can also request taxi service via smartphone applications, which are secure and have standard rates. There is also the possibility of renting cars, contacting companies also located at international arrivals. They commonly travel through Elmer Faucett Avenues, La Marina Avenue (connects with the districts of southern Lima and those with high hotel offerings such as San Isidro and Miraflores), Tomás Valle (connects with Lima Norte, Lima Este, Rimac and with the Historic Center), Javier Prado, Pan-American Highway North, South, Vía de Evitamiento and Yellow Line.

=== Road ===
Temporary bridges allow access to the new terminal until the construction of the Puente Santa Rosa is complete. The government did not permanent build bridges across the Rímac River, leaving dead-end roads near where a proposed highway is supposed to connect in another three years. The new Line 4 of the Lima and Callao Metro, expected to open in 2028, will have a station near the old terminal but there are not plans to connect the new airport; the Airport station will be renamed to prevent confusion.

== Accidents and incidents ==
- November 27, 1962: Varig Flight 810, a Boeing 707-441 registration PP-VJB flying from Rio de Janeiro to Jorge Chávez International Airport, after initiating an overshoot procedure at the suggestion of the control tower because it was too high, proceeded to start another approach when it crashed into La Cruz peak, 8 miles (7.0 nmi; 13 km) from the airport. Possibly there was a misinterpretation of navigation instruments. All 97 passengers and crew aboard died.
- May 8, 1964: an Argentine Air Force Douglas C-54 registration T-47 flying from Buenos Aires to Jorge Chávez International Airport crashed into a sand dune during approach in poor visibility conditions, killing 46 of the 49 people on board.
- August 6, 1986: an explosion of unknown origin occurred at a restroom in the domestic terminal.
- December 8, 1987: a Peruvian Navy Fokker 27-400M registration AE-560 flying from Pucallpa to Jorge Chávez International Airport chartered by the Alianza Lima football team crashed into the Pacific Ocean shortly before landing. A malfunctioning cockpit indicator made the crew believe that the landing gear was not properly deployed and locked, so they requested the control tower to allow the plane to make a low pass for a visual check by ground personnel. After receiving the confirmation that the landing gear was down, the aircraft circled the airport for another attempt to land, but plunged into the ocean instead, killing all on board except the pilot.
- March 10, 1989: an Aero Condor Britten-Norman BN-2A Islander registration OB-1271 flying from Nazca to Jorge Chavez International Airport crashed into a building during approach killing all on board, apparently due to fuel exhaustion.
- January 25, 1991: a car bomb placed by the Tupac Amaru Revolutionary Movement (MRTA) killed two Peruvians and wounded ten people. The attack occurred in a context of condemnation, by left-wing armed groups and political movements, of Operation Desert Storm; minutes after the attack, the US Embassy in Lima was attacked with an RPG and small arms fire by the MRTA.
- July 24, 1992: five American Airlines employees, charged with cleaning and baggage loading duties, were wounded by a bomb. This happened during the weekend in which Shining Path enforced a 48-hour nationwide "armed strike" that aimed at paralyzing, among other services, public transportation.
- January 22, 1993: three bullets hit the right side of the fuselage of American Airlines Flight 917, an Airbus A300 inbound from Miami with 177 passengers and 13 crew, while either landing or taxiing on the runway after landing. There were no casualties and damage to the plane was minimal. Despite Shining Path (SP) claiming responsibility for the attack, a subsequent investigation failed to identify the actual assailants. Airport authorities reportedly stated that the source of the shots was accidental, originating in a security guard working in the perimeter. The incident, occurring in the context of a decade-long leftist insurgency against the Peruvian state, happened in the midst of a surge of terrorist attacks and assassinations during that month, which also targeted US interests and businesses.
- October 26, 1993: two people were killed, and thirty were wounded by a car bomb explosion in the airport's parking lot.
- April 15, 1995: an Imperial Air Tupolev Tu-134A-3 registration OB-1553 flying from Cusco to Jorge Chavez International Airport suffered a tire failure after departure. The crew decided to continue the flight to Lima, but the left main landing gear did not extend during landing. There were no fatalities, but the aircraft was damaged beyond repair.
- October 2, 1996: Flight 603, an Aeroperú Boeing 757-23A registration N52AW flying the Miami–Lima–Santiago route crashed into the Pacific Ocean some minutes after its takeoff from Jorge Chávez International Airport, killing all on board. The accident investigation found that masking tape was accidentally left over the static ports during maintenance, rendering the airspeed indicator, altimeter and vertical speed indicator unreliable.
- On December 13, 2003, at 22:48 local time, Aero Continente Flight 341, a Boeing 737-200 (registered OB-1544-P) operating from Caracas to Lima, belly landed at the runway because the pilots had forgotten about lowering the landing gear since they had to cope with a problem concerning the flaps. The aircraft was damaged beyond repair, but all 94 passengers and six crew on board survived the accident.
- On October 11, 2013, an Airbus A320 (registration N492TA) from TACA Airlines, made an emergency landing at 8:20 am Local Time. The pilot declared an emergency due to smoke in the cockpit. The aircraft was en route from Jorge Chávez International Airport to El Salvador International Airport, San Salvador, El Salvador. There were 31 passengers plus crew on board. The aircraft landed safely.
- On November 18, 2022, a LATAM Peru A320neo taking off as Flight 2213 to Juliaca collided with a fire engine that was crossing the runway, killing two firefighters and injuring a third. All 102 passengers and 6 crew aboard the plane escaped unharmed.

== See also ==
- Transport in Peru
- List of airports in Peru
- Aeropuertos del Perú, another airport operator
