= KTB =

KTB can mean:

- Cretaceous-Paleogene boundary also known as Cretaceous-Tertiary boundary
- Khatib MRT station (station abbreviation KTB), Yishun, Singapore
- Krung Thai Bank, state-owned Thai commercial bank
- ktb, ISO 639-3 code for the Kambaata language
- KTB, an airline code (see list of airline codes)
  - Thorne Bay seaplane base
  - Transaviabaltika
- K-T-B, triconsonantal root of a number of Semitic words
- Kontinentales Tiefbohrprogramm der Bundesrepublik Deutschland (German Continental Deep Drilling Program), a German scientific project
- KTB, stock symbol for Kontoor Brands
