= Huánuco (disambiguation) =

Huánuco is a city in Peru.

Huánuco may also refer to:

- Huánuco Province, in Peru
- Huánuco Region, same
- Huánuco Airport, the city's airport
