= Andahuaylas Airport =

Airport in Peru

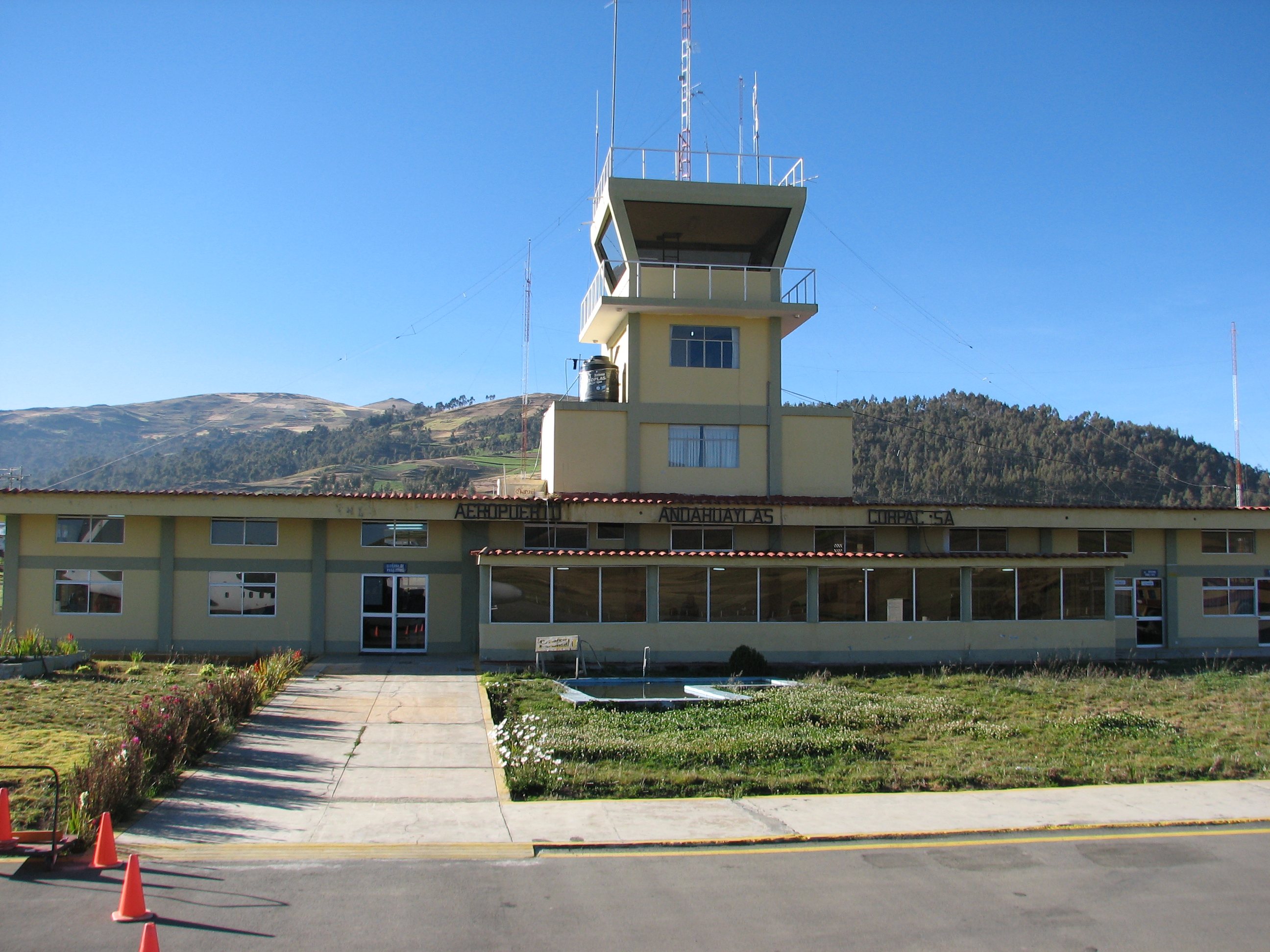
- IATA: ANS; ICAO: SPHY

Summary
- Airport type: Public
- Operator: CORPAC S.A.
- Serves: Andahuaylas
- Elevation AMSL: 11,300 ft (3,400 m)
- Coordinates: 13°42′30″S 73°21′05″W

Map
- Location of airport in Peru

Runways
Direction	Length		Surface
Direction	m	ft	Surface
03/21	2,500	8,202	Asphalt
- Sources: GCM

Andahuaylas Airport (IATA: ANS, ICAO: SPHY) is a high-elevation airport serving the city of Andahuaylas, in Peru. It is an important airport in the Apurímac Region as being the only one capable of receiving commercial flights. It is operated by the civil government. Apart from scheduled flights, it also has many charter flights.

The airport is 6 kilometres (3.7 mi) southeast of Andahuaylas, and sits on a mesa above the Chumbao River, which continues north and west into the town. There is high terrain in all quadrants.

== Airlines and destinations ==
Airlines	Destinations
ATSA Airlines	Lima

== See also ==
- Transport in Peru
- List of airports in Peru
- List of highest commercial airports
