= Central American Airways Flight 731 =

2011 aviation accident

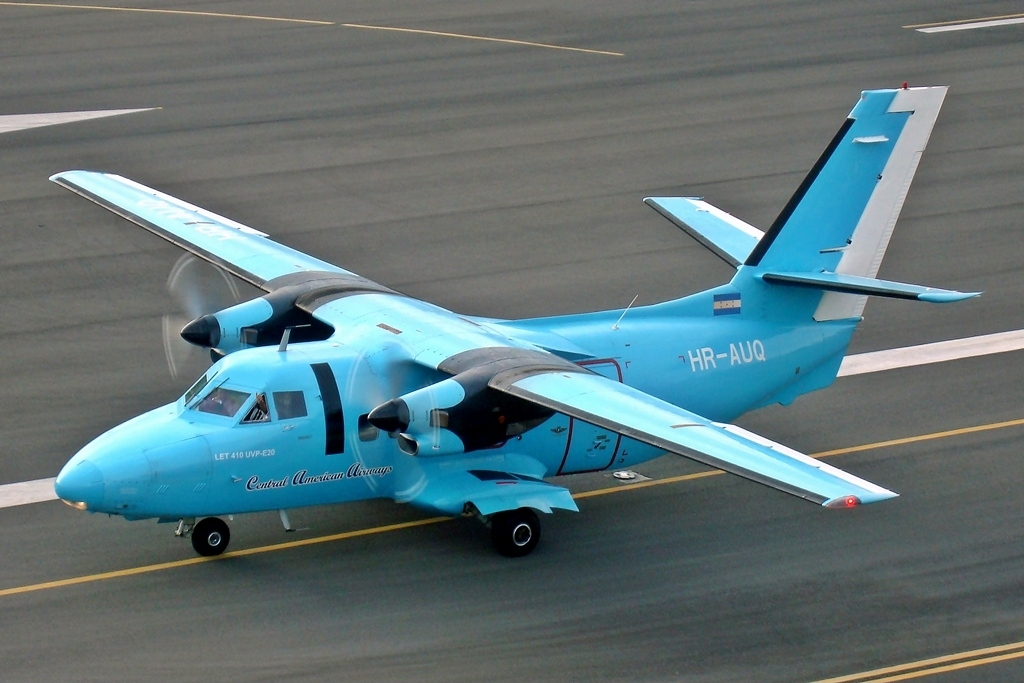
- HR-AUQ, the aircraft involved, seen in 2010

Accident
- Date: February 14, 2011
- Summary: Controlled flight into terrain
- Site: Near Santa Ana, Francisco Morazán Department, Honduras; 13.9501°N 87.2532°W

Aircraft
- Aircraft type: Let L-410UVP-E20
- Operator: Central American Airways
- Registration: HR-AUQ
- Flight origin: Ramón Villeda Morales International Airport, San Pedro Sula, Honduras
- Destination: Toncontín International Airport, Tegucigalpa, Honduras
- Occupants: 14
- Passengers: 12
- Crew: 2
- Fatalities: 14
- Survivors: 0

Central American Airways Flight 731 was a passenger flight which crashed on approach to Toncontín International Airport, Tegucigalpa, Honduras, on February 14, 2011. All 14 on board died. The aircraft involved, a Let L-410 Turbolet, was operating Central American Airlines' scheduled domestic service from San Pedro Sula to Tegucigalpa.

== Accident ==
Flight 731 had taken off from La Mesa International Airport in San Pedro Sula at 07:04 local time (13:04 UTC) on February 14 for a 40-minute flight to Toncontín airport in Tegucigalpa. On board were twelve passengers and two crew.

At around 07:35, the Turbolet initiated a non-precision approach to runway 20 at Toncontín, which is situated at an elevation of 3,300 ft (1,000 m). Meteorological conditions at the time were such that the cloud base was lower than surrounding high ground. Wind shear and mountain wave were also present at altitude.

At 07:51, the crew discontinued the approach and was authorised by air traffic control to attempt an approach to the opposite runway 02. Dialogues captured by the cockpit voice recorder (CVR) suggest that the crew was receiving conflicting indications from the on board navigation instruments, but at 08:00, while continuing its descent, the crew reported to be on final approach.

Around two minutes later, the CVR recorded the five hundred and minimum calls by the on-board ground proximity warning system, followed by a terrain, pull up call. There was no reaction by the crew. The aircraft impacted a hillside near El Espino, in the Jurisdicción de Santa Ana, at an elevation of 5,400 ft (1,600 m).

== Background ==
=== Aircraft ===
The aircraft involved in the accident was a twin-turboprop Let L-410UVP-E20 Turbolet with Honduran registration HR-AUQ, serial number 912603. It first flew in 1991, and served with a number of airlines before the accident.

=== Crew ===
The Captain, Oscar Anderson, age 57, had a total of 15,300 total of flying hours.

The First officer, Eduardo Fash, age 42, had a total of 4,810 total flying hours.

== Victims ==
All 12 passengers and 2 crew on board were killed.

Among the victims were a cabinet minister, assistant secretary, a former finance secretary, and one union leader. Two of the victims were American and one Canadian.

== Aftermath ==
In response to the incident, the government of Honduras declared three days of national mourning for the deceased government officials.

The head of the investigation stated that because the aircraft was European, and not American, it created difficulties as there were very few experienced local pilots and technicians trained to operate on the aircraft.

The accident raised questions about the safety and relocation of the Tegucigalpa Airport. The President of Honduras called for the airport to be relocated, stating that it was impossible to have a major airport in its current location due to the surrounding terrain.

== Investigation ==
The investigation report by the accident investigation board of Honduras' Dirección General de Aeronáutica Civil (DGAC) stated that weather was a factor in the accident. During the approach, the aircraft was flown at a speed only slightly higher than its stall speed, and in such conditions, wind shear could result in a stall from which recovery could be impossible before impact with the ground.

The DGAC found that the crew did not adhere to any published approach procedure and possibly misinterpreted the altimeter and airspeed indicators. During the descent, the captain did not check his approach chart and relied instead on the first officer for guidance through the approach. Communication and crew resource management were described as inadequate, and no approach briefing was carried out for any of the two approaches.

Finally, the aircraft was prematurely configured for landing with full flaps while still at a considerable distance from the runway, making it more vulnerable to the effects of wind shear. Eleven safety recommendations were made.
