= Fraport =

German transport company which operates Frankfurt Airport

Coordinates: 50.0521°N 8.5824°E

Fraport AG Frankfurt Airport Services Worldwide

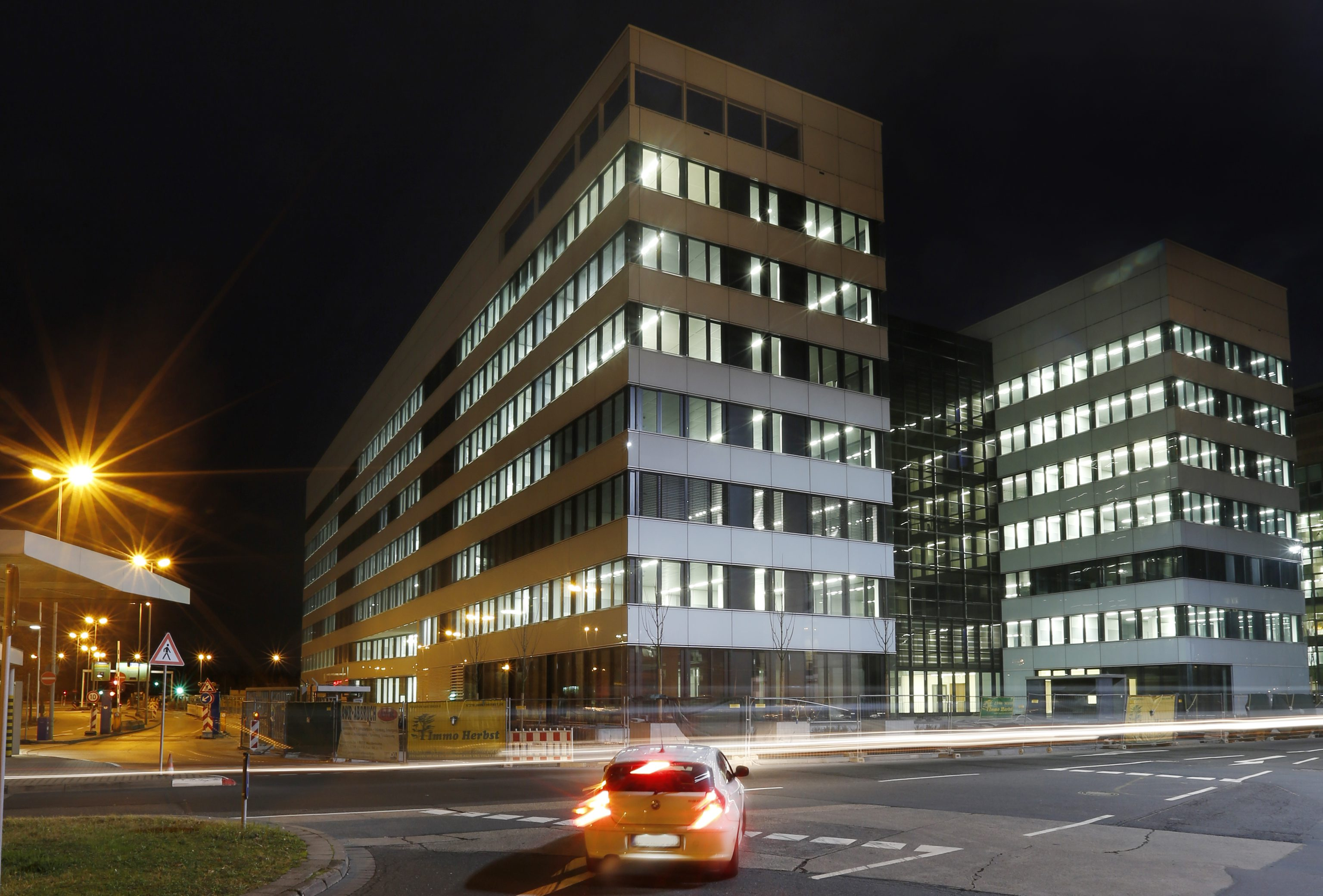
- Fraport head office
- Type: Aktiengesellschaft
- Traded as: FWB: FRA; MDAX component
- ISIN: DE0005773303
- Industry: Transportation
- Founded: 1924 (as Südwestdeutsche Luftverkehrs AG)
- Headquarters: Frankfurt Airport; Frankfurt am Main, Hesse, Germany
- Key people: Stefan Schulte (CEO and chairman of the executive board), Michael Boddenberg (Chairman of the supervisory board)
- Services: Airport operation
- Revenue: ▲€4.427 billion (2024)
- Operating income: ▲€770 million (2024)
- Net income: ▲€502 million (2024)
- Total assets: ▲€20.253 billion (2024)
- Total equity: ▲€5.178 billion (2024)
- Number of employees: 20,591 (2024)
- Website: www.fraport.com

Fraport AG Frankfurt Airport Services Worldwide, commonly known as Fraport, is a German transport company which operates Frankfurt Airport in Frankfurt am Main and holds interests in the operation of several other airports around the world. In the past the firm also managed the smaller Frankfurt-Hahn Airport located 130 kilometers west of the city. It is listed on the Frankfurt Stock Exchange and also through the exchange's Xetra trading system. The company's shares are included in the MDAX. The company's current chief executive officer is Stefan Schulte. As of 2019, the company has 22,514 employees and annual revenues of about €3.3 billion. Fraport was the main sponsor of the Bundesliga football team Eintracht Frankfurt from 2002 to 2012.

Fraport AG is also involved in ground handling operations at its own operated airports and at third-party operated airports. It mostly operates ground handling services in a deregulated context. Fraport was also involved to make Frankfurt Airport and Indira Gandhi International Airport ready for Airbus A380 operations.

== Operations ==
In addition to various management and infrastructure subsidiaries related to Frankfurt Airport, Fraport's holdings include the following airport operating companies:

Company	Airport(s) operated	Country	Ownership	Lease start	Lease time
DIAL Delhi International Airport Private Limited	Indira Gandhi International Airport (DEL)	India	10%	2006	2036; sold to GMR Group in 2025
Fraport TAV Antalya Management A.S.	Antalya Airport (AYT)	Turkey	50/51%	1999	2024
Fraport Twin Star Airport Management AD	Burgas Airport (BOJ), Varna Airport (VAR)	Bulgaria	60%	2006	2041
Lima Airport Partners S.R.L.	Jorge Chávez International Airport (LIM)	Peru	80.01%	2001	2041
Ljubljana Airport	Ljubljana Airport (LJU)	Slovenia	100%	2014	no limit
Northern Capital Gateway LLC	Pulkovo Airport (LED)	Russia	25%	2010	2040; terminated in 2022
AirMall	retail at Baltimore-Washington International Airport (BWI), Boston Logan International Airport (BOS), Pittsburgh International Airport (PIT), Cleveland Hopkins International Airport (CLE)	United States	100%	2014	unknown
Xi'an Xianyang International Airport Co., Ltd.	Xi'an Xianyang International Airport (XIY)	China	24.5%	2008	To be sold in 2022
Fraport Brasil – Fortaleza	Pinto Martins – Fortaleza International Airport (FOR)	Brazil	100%	January 2018	2047
Fraport Brasil – Porto Alegre	Salgado Filho International Airport (POA)	Brazil	100%	January 2018	2042

=== Greece ===
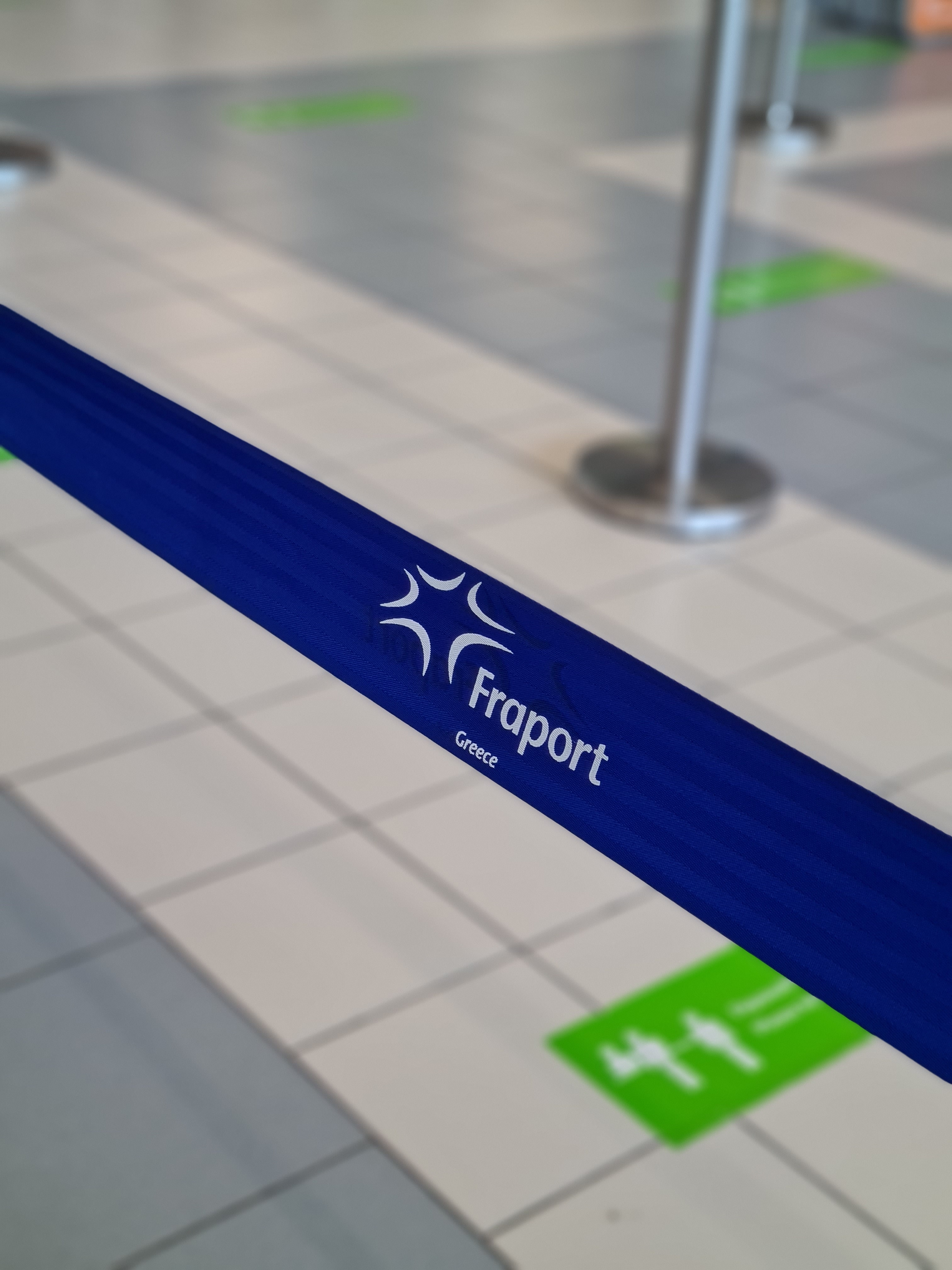
A Fraport Greece band barrier at Zakynthos airport

As of December 2015, Greece's government signed a privatization deal with Fraport and Greek energy firm Copelouzos with awarding them a 1.2 billion euro contract to lease and manage 14 regional airports for a concession period of 40 years. Fraport started managing the 14 regional airports from 11 April 2017. They have published their master plan for each airport and the computer renderings (external views) of the 14 airports after the completion of the construction works.

The airports included in the concession are:

- Aktion National Airport
- Cephalonia International Airport
- Chania International Airport
- Corfu International Airport
- Kavala International Airport
- Kos Island International Airport
- Mytilene International Airport
- Mykonos Island National Airport
- Rhodes International Airport
- Samos International Airport
- Santorini (Thira) National Airport
- Skiathos Island National Airport
- Thessaloniki International Airport
- Zakynthos International Airport

Many complaints have been filed by General Aviation aircraft owners from Greece and abroad, due to high pricing policy and lack of parking spaces in Greek airports operated by Fraport.

== Business trends ==
The key trends for Fraport are (as at the financial year ending December 31):

	Revenue (€ bn)	Net profit (€ m)	Total assets (€ bn)	Employees
2016	2.5	375	8.8	20,322
2017	2.9	330	10.8	20,673
2018	3.4	474	11.4	21,961
2019	3.7	421	12.6	22,514
2020	1.6	–658	14.0	21,164
2021	2.1	83	16.2	18,419
2022	3.1	132	17.6	18,850
2023	4.0	393	18.8	17,840
2024	4.4	451	20.3	19,001

== Headquarters ==
The company's articles of association designate Frankfurt am Main as the company's registered office. Fraport's facilities are on the property of Frankfurt Airport in the city's Flughafen district. Its head office building is Building 178, close to Tor 3 (gate 3).

== Shareholders ==
The company's current shareholding structure is as follows.

Shareholders	Percentage
State of Hesse	31.31%
Stadtwerke Frankfurt am Main Holding GmbH	20.32%
Deutsche Lufthansa AG	8.44%
Lazard	5.02%
Free float/ no indication	34.91%
