= Santa Ana, Francisco Morazán =

Santa Ana
- Municipality
- Location in Honduras
- Coordinates: 13°56′N 87°16′W
- Country: Honduras
- Department: Francisco Morazán

Area
  - Total: 66 km^{2} (25 sq mi)

Population (2015)
  - Total: 16,439
  - Density: 250/km^{2} (650/sq mi)

Santa Ana is a municipality in the Honduran department of Francisco Morazán.

The location of the crash of Central American Airways Flight 731 was El Espino in Santa Ana.
