= Lima Airport Partners =

Operates Jorge Chávez airport, Peru

Lima Airport Partners S.R.L. (LAP)
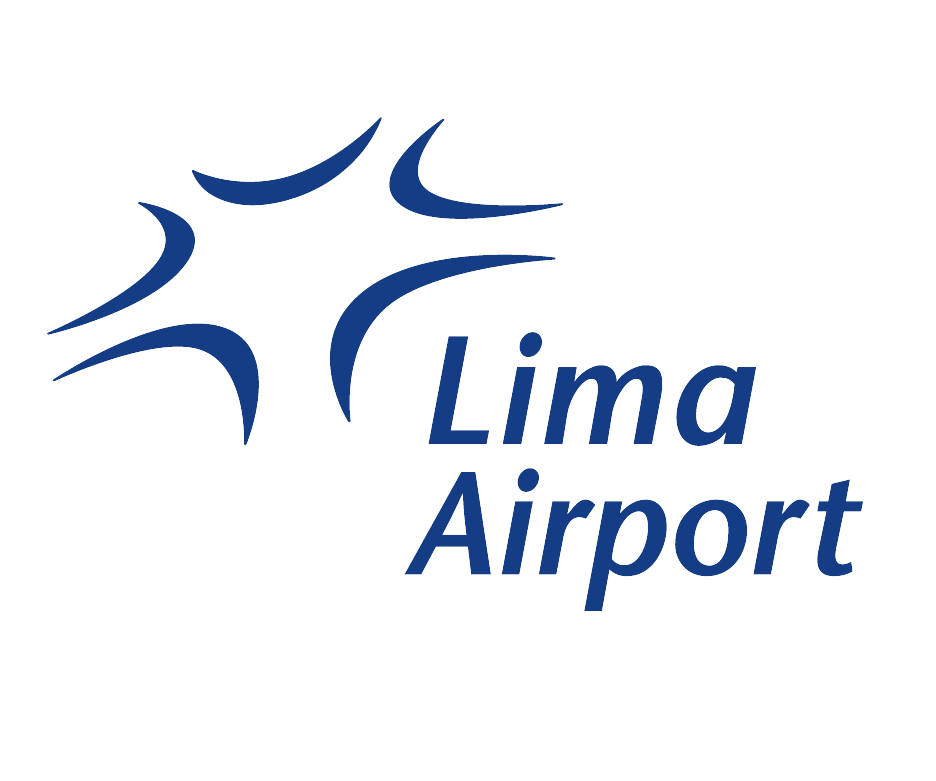
- Company type: Limited liability company
- Industry: Transport
- Founded: February 14, 2001
- Headquarters: Central Building - Jorge Chavez International Airport, Lima, Peru
- Key people: Marcelo Pauli Talavera alias frentota(CEO); Gustavo Morales; Milagros Noriega; Fernando Ocompo; Dr. Babett Stapel; Sabine Trenk(COO)
- Products: Airport operations and services
- Owner: Fraport

Lima Airport Partners S.R.L. is a Limited liability company that operates Peru's main airport: the Jorge Chávez International Airport in Callao, near Lima. It was founded in February 2001 and holds a 30-year concession to operate the airport. The company is 80.01% owned by Fraport AG of Germany.

== History ==
- On November 15, 2000, a joint venture consisting of German airport operator Fraport AG Frankfurt Airport Services Worldwide, Bechtel Enterprises International Ltd. - a North American holding originally dedicated to construction - and Peruvian construction company Cosapi S.A. won the thirty-year concession from the Peruvian State to build, operate and transfer the Jorge Chavez International Airport in Callao, Peru.
- In December 2001, Bechtel Enterprise Services, Ltd. transferred its LAP shares to Alterra Lima Holdings, Ltd., subsidiary of Alterra Partners, an airport operator whose shareholders are Bechtel and Singapore Changi Airport Enterprise (operator of the Singapore International Airport).
- In September 2003, Cosapi S.A. sold its LAP shares to Alterra Holdings, Ltd. Consequently, the distribution of shares turned 57.25% for Alterra Lima Holdings, Ltd. and 42.75% for Fraport AG.
- In August 2007, Fraport AG Frankfurt Airport Services Worldwide acquired 57.25% of Alterra Lima Holdings and turned into the main shareholder of Lima Airport Partners.
- In June 2008, the International Finance Corporation, member of the World Bank group, and Fund for Investment in Infrastructure, Public Services and Natural Resources, administered by AC Capitales SAFI, became partners of LAP. Therefore, the share distribution turned:

   70.01%, Fraport AG 
   19.99%, International Finance Corporation 
   10.00%, Fund for Investment in Infrastructure, Public Services and Natural Resources

=== Tenth anniversary ===
On February 2, 2011, Fraport and Lima Airport Partners celebrated the 10th anniversary of the airport concession in an event attended by important Peruvian business and political leaders as well as by Peru's vice president Luis Giampietri. Stefan Schulte, Fraport's executive board chairman, took the occasion to point out the significant improvements in the quality of infrastructure and services provided as well as the increase in the number of passengers which reached more than 10 million by the end of 2010.

=== 2019 ===
In May 2019, Fraport AG purchased a further 10-percent stake in Lima Airport Partners S.R.L. (LAP) – operator consortium of Jorge Chavez International Airport Lima – from AC Capitales’ Infrastructure Fund, which held the stake for over 10 years. The resulting partnership structure of LAP was as follows: Fraport AG 80.01% and IFC 19.99%.

== See also ==
- Fraport AG
- Jorge Chávez International Airport
- Aeropuertos del Perú
- CORPAC
