= Plus Ultra Líneas Aéreas =

Spanish airline

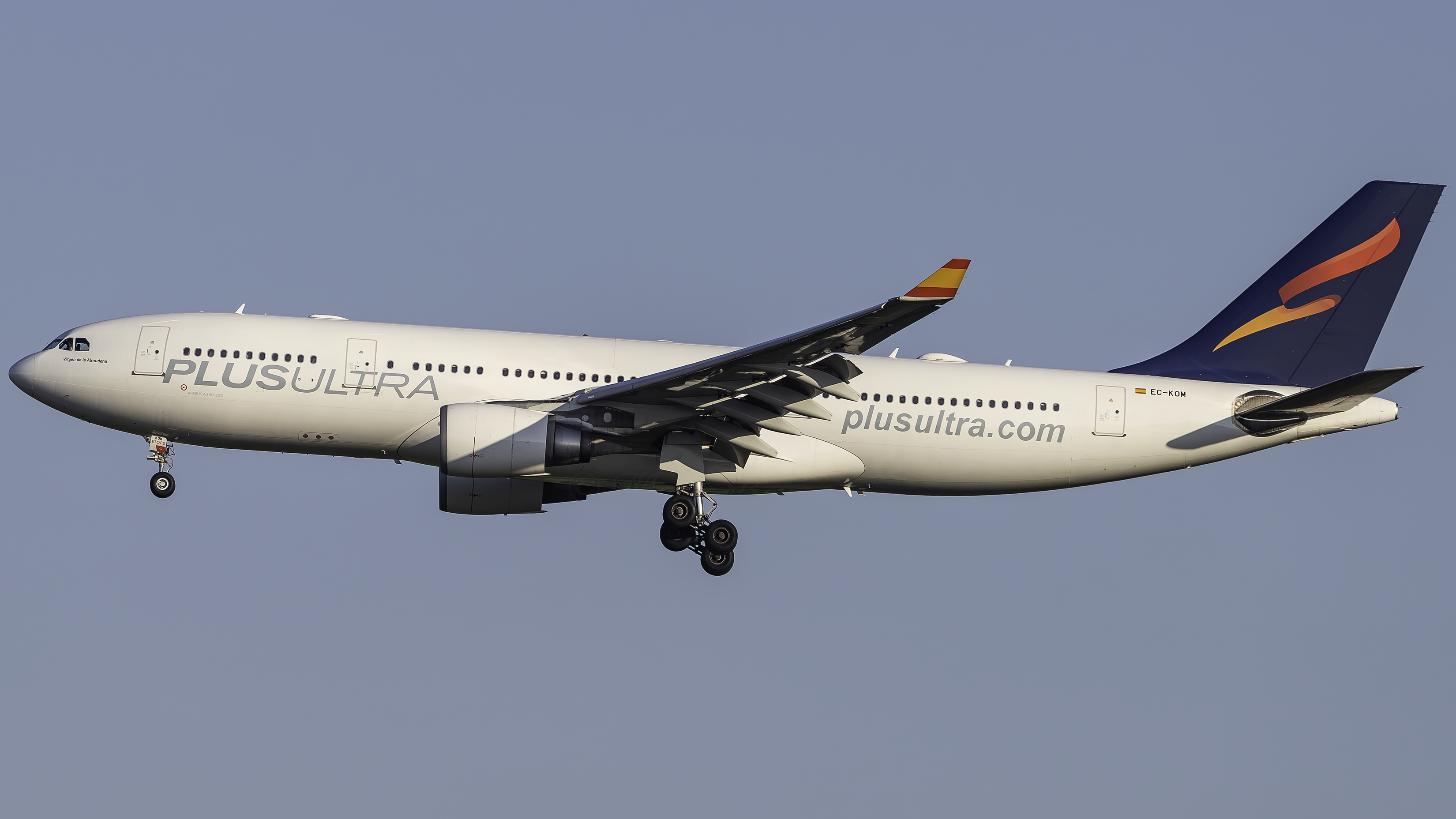
- Plus Ultra Lineas Aereas Airbus A330-200
| IATA | ICAO | Call sign |
|---|---|---|
| PU | PUE | SPANISH |
- Founded: 2011; 15 years ago
- Commenced operations: 5 August 2015; 11 years ago
- Hubs: Adolfo Suárez Madrid–Barajas Airport
- Frequent-flyer program: Premier Plus
- Fleet size: 7
- Destinations: 8
- Headquarters: Madrid, Community of Madrid, Spain
- Key people: Roberto Roselli (CEO)
- Founder: Julio Miguel Martínez Sola
- Website: www.plusultra.com

Plus Ultra Líneas Aéreas S.A. is a Spanish long-haul airline based at Adolfo Suárez Madrid–Barajas Airport.

== History ==
Plus Ultra was founded in 2011 by the former director of the now-defunct Air Madrid, Julio Miguel Martínez Sola. Plus ultra ("Further beyond") is a Latin motto and the national motto of Spain. It is taken from the personal motto of Charles V, Holy Roman Emperor and King of Spain, and is a reversal of the original phrase Non plus ultra ("Nothing further beyond").

On 15 June 2016 the airline started operating regular flights, with destinations such as Santo Domingo and Lima. The initial fleet was made up of two pre-owned Airbus A340-300s which had been taken over from Gulf Air in late 2014. In March 2017, the airline announced two new routes: Barcelona-Madrid-Santiago from 15 June 2017 and Barcelona-Havana from 1 July 2017, however, both flights did not commence service. One year later, Plus Ultra announced plans to serve Caracas from Tenerife–North.

In March 2021, the Spanish government announced an aid of 53 million euros from the fund created to support companies considered strategic during the economic crisis derived from COVID-19. The public bailout was controversial and went to court, although in January 2023 the judge of the Madrid Court of Instruction No. 15 dismissed the case. On 11 December 2025, an investigation into the company was made public by the same court for alleged money laundering. That same day, police arrested the airline's owner and CEO after searching its headquarters.

== Destinations ==
As of June 2026, Plus Ultra Líneas Aéreas operates scheduled flights to the following destinations:

| Country | City | Airport | Notes | Refs |
|---|---|---|---|---|
| Argentina | Buenos Aires | Ministro Pistarini International Airport | | |
| Chile | Santiago | Arturo Merino Benítez International Airport | Terminated | |
| Colombia | Bogotá | El Dorado International Airport | Suspended | |
| Colombia | Cartagena | Rafael Núñez International Airport | Suspended | |
| Cuba | La Havana | José Martí International Airport | Terminated | |
| Dominican Republic | Samaná | Samaná El Catey International Airport | Terminated | |
| Dominican Republic | Santiago de los Caballeros | Cibao International Airport | Terminated | |
| Dominican Republic | Santo Domingo | Las Américas International Airport | Terminated | |
| Ecuador | Guayaquil | José Joaquín de Olmedo International Airport | Suspended | |
| Ecuador | Quito | Mariscal Sucre International Airport | Suspended | |
| Equatorial Guinea | Malabo | Malabo International Airport | | |
| Peru | Lima | Jorge Chávez International Airport | | |
| Poland | Katowice | Katowice Airport | Seasonal charter | |
| Poland | Warsaw | Warsaw Chopin Airport | Suspended | |
| Spain | Madrid | Madrid–Barajas Airport | Hub | |
| Spain | Tenerife | Tenerife North Airport | | |
| Venezuela | Caracas | Simón Bolívar International Airport | | |
| Venezuela | Porlamar | Santiago Mariño Caribbean International Airport | Seasonal charter | |

=== Codeshare and Interline agreements ===
Plus Ultra has a codeshare agreement with LASER Airlines to offer flights to Porlamar, ITA Airways for connections between Italy and South America (via Madrid) and a Interline agreement with Star Peru to connect Madrid with other cities in Peru.

== Fleet ==
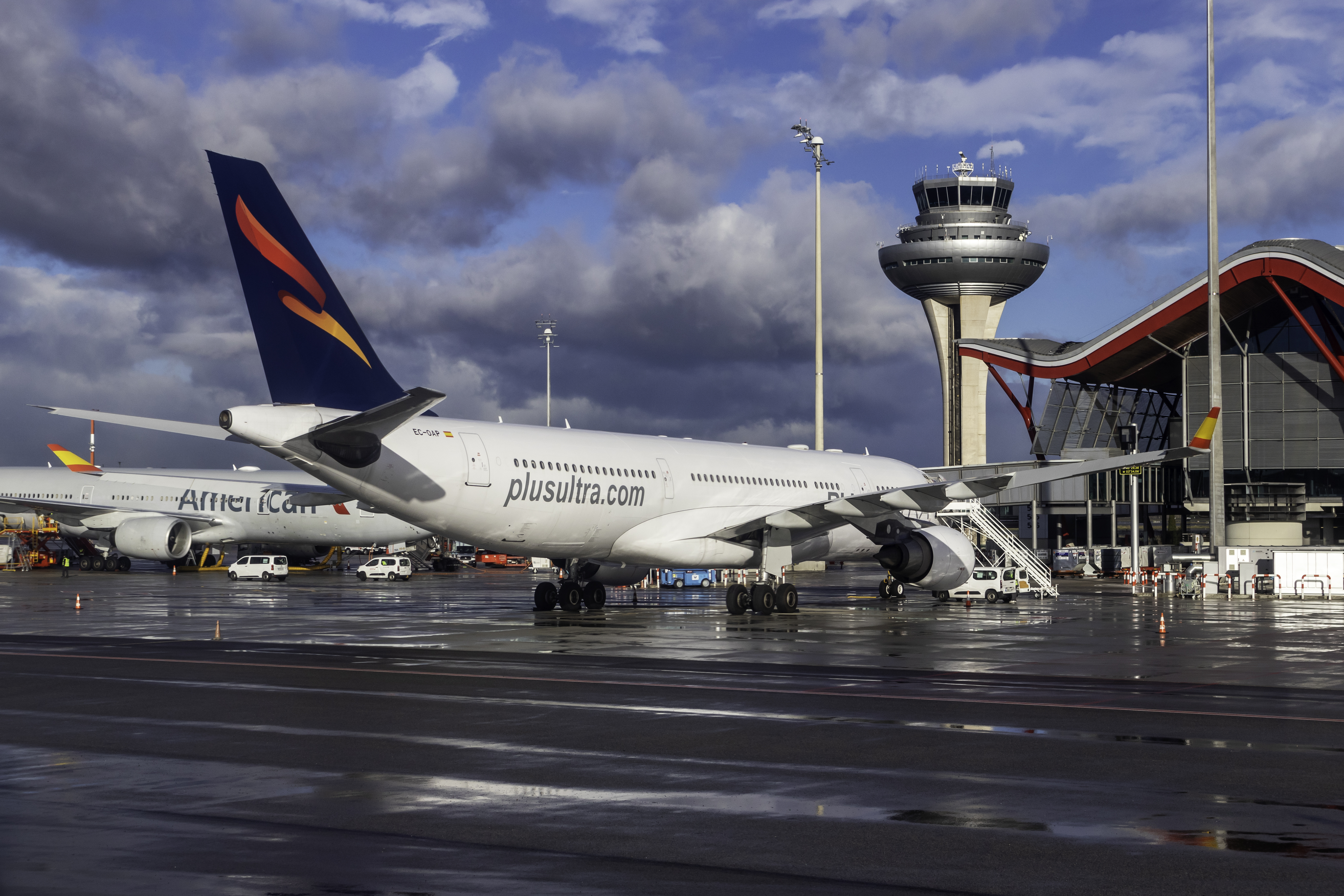
Plus Ultra Airbus A330-200

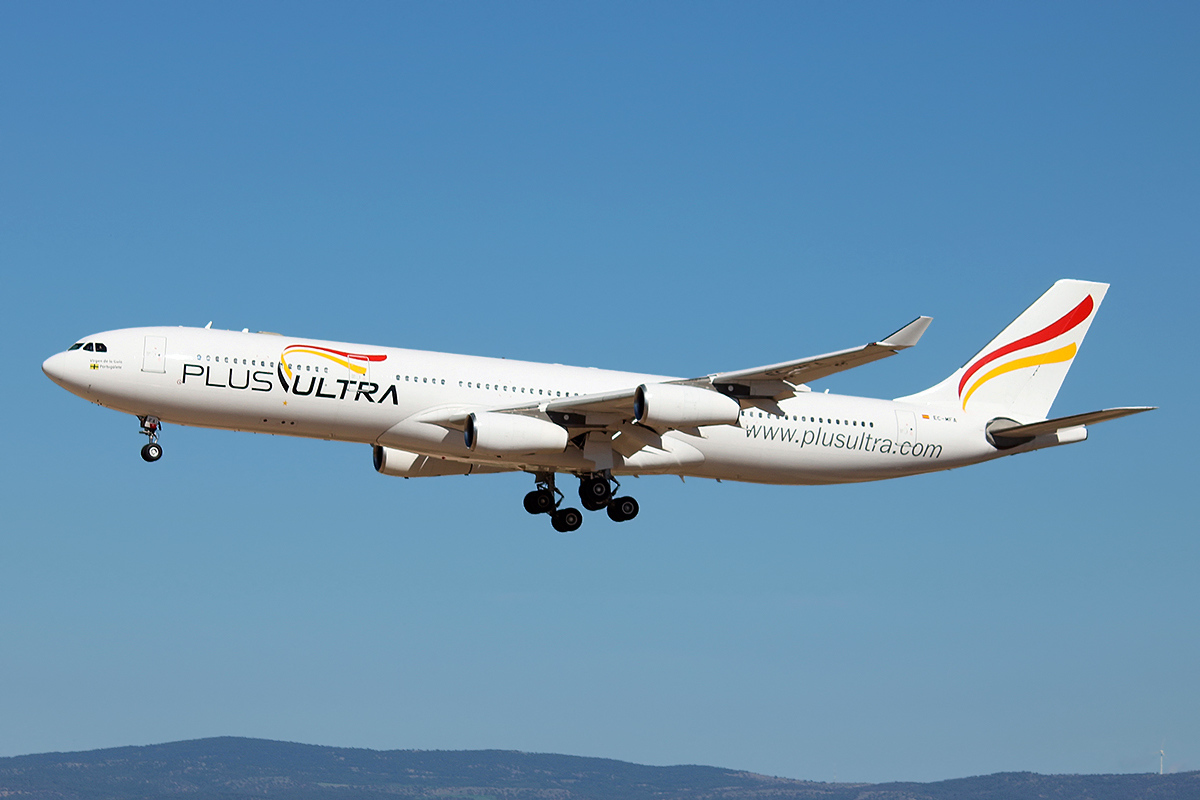
Former Plus Ultra Airbus A340-300

=== Current fleet ===
As of May 2026, Plus Ultra Líneas Aéreas operates the following aircraft:

Plus Ultra Líneas Aéreas fleet
| Aircraft | In service | Orders | Passengers | | | | Notes |
| Aircraft | In service | Orders | C | W | Y | Total | Notes |
|---|---|---|---|---|---|---|---|
| Airbus A330-200 | 5 | — | 24 | – | 268 | 292 | |
| Airbus A330-200 | 5 | — | 24 | – | 272 | 296 | |
| Airbus A330-200 | 5 | — | 24 | – | 275 | 299 | |
| Airbus A330-300 | 2 | — | 36 | – | 263 | 299 | |
| Airbus A330-300 | 2 | — | 30 | – | 272 | 302 | |
| Total | 7 | — | | | | | |

=== Former fleet ===
Plus Ultra previously operated the following aircraft:

Plus Ultra Líneas Aéreas former fleet
| Aircraft | Total | Introduced | Retired | Notes |
|---|---|---|---|---|
| Airbus A340-300 | 4 | 2015 | 2025 | |
| Airbus A340-600 | 2 | 2019 | 2022 | |
| Boeing 777-200ER | 1 | 2017 | —N/a | Wet-leased from Privilege Style |

== See also ==
- List of airlines of Spain
