= Directorate General of Civil Aeronautics (Honduras) =

Directorate General of Civil Aeronautics (Spanish: Dirección General de Aeronáutica Civil, DGAC), is the civil aviation authority of Honduras. The headquarters is in Tegucigalpa.

== Accident investigations ==
The agency investigates aircraft accidents and incidents in Honduras. The agency investigated the crash of Central American Airways Flight 731.

Honduran authorities delegated the investigation of the TACA Flight 390 accident at Toncontín International Airport in 2008 to the Salvadoran Civil Aviation Authority in accordance with the Convention on International Civil Aviation.
