= Archana Airways =

Indian regional airline (1994–2000)

Archana Airways अर्चना एयरवैस
IATA	ICAO	Call sign
—	ACY	ARCHANA
- Founded: 29 April 1991; 35 years ago
- Commenced operations: 1993; 33 years ago
- Ceased operations: 2000; 26 years ago
- Hubs: Delhi
- Fleet size: 20
- Destinations: 5
- Headquarters: New Delhi

Archana Airways was a regional airline based in New Delhi, India. It operated domestic scheduled services with a fleet of turboprop aircraft from 1994 to 2000.

== History ==
Archana Airways Limited was founded on 29 April 1991 and started its full service operation in 1993 with three brand new Czech built L-410 UVP-E9, 17 seater commuter aircraft. In 1994 the company was granted scheduled airlines status by the Government of India through Directorate General of Civil Aviation, New Delhi.

Seeing the quality of service provided by Archana Airways, in 1994, it was approached by MPAVN (now MPSIDC) to connect some sectors in the state of Madhya Pradesh and also subscribe equity of the company as co-promoter.

Archana was among the smallest of the 30 old aviation companies which had come into being by 1994. The airline quickly set up in-house facilities, for overhaul of aircraft and training programs for pilots, cabin attendants, traffic assistants and security staff.

Archana was operating its schedule flight to Kullu, Shimla, Jaipur, Udaipur and Jodhpur sector.

In the beginning of 1995, to connect more sectors, the company planned an expansion to acquire bigger capacity aircraft. The plan was to acquire two new DASH-8 Aircraft on deferred credit basis.

Two of the company's three L410 (17 Seater) aircraft met with accidents in Kanpur ('96) and Kullu ('96). The company acquired three new Let L-410 aircraft during 96–97. The promoters started feeling credit crunch and were unable to pay the instalments for the aircraft. The company incurred heavy losses due to low load factors and high cost of operation. In 2000, the airline went out of business.

== Destinations ==
As of October 1994, Archana Airways served the following cities:

India

- Chandigarh
  - Chandigarh Airport
- Chhattisgarh
  - Raipur – Raipur Airport
- Delhi
  - Indira Gandhi International Airport Hub
- Himachal Pradesh
  - Dharamshala – Gaggal Airport
  - Kullu – Kullu Airport
  - Shimla – Shimla Airport
- Madhya Pradesh
  - Bhopal – Raja Bhoj Airport
  - Jabalpur – Jabalpur Airport
- Punjab
  - Ludhiana – Ludhiana Airport

== Incidents and accidents ==
- On 18 May 1996, an Archana Airways L-410UVP-E9D (VT-ETB) touched down late and overran the runway at Kanpur Airport, India, striking the boundary wall of the airport and coming to a halt. All 19 people on board survived.
- An Archana Airways Let L 410 crashed after taking off from Shimla while operating on the Delhi-Shimla-Bhunter-Delhi sector on the morning of 11 July 1996, killing all 9 people aboard (including three flight crew members). Airline negligence was blamed.

== Fleet ==
Archana Airways operated the Bombardier Dash 20 aircraft. It formerly operated Let L-410 aircraft.

== Current status ==
Archana Airways Limited has been taken over by Ascent Pinnacle Capital Limited.
