= Rivne Universal Avia =

Ukrainian regional airline

IATA	ICAO	Call sign
-	UNR	RIVNE UNIVERSAL
- Hubs: Rivne Airport
- Fleet size: 13
- Headquarters: Rivne, Ukraine

Rivne Universal Avia (Ukrainian: Рівненська авіакомпанія "Універсал-Авіа") was an airline based in Rivne, Ukraine. It operated a fleet of regional aircraft from Rivne for UPS. Its main base was Rivne Airport.

== Fleet ==
In August 2006, the Rivne Universal Avia fleet included:

- 1 Let L-410 T
- 12 Let L-410 UVP
