= Central American Airways =

Airline of Honduras

IATA	ICAO	Call sign
-	CRW	CENTRAL AMERICAN
- Founded: March 22, 2008
- Ceased operations: September 1, 2011
- Hubs: Toncontin International Airport
- Website: www.caa.hn

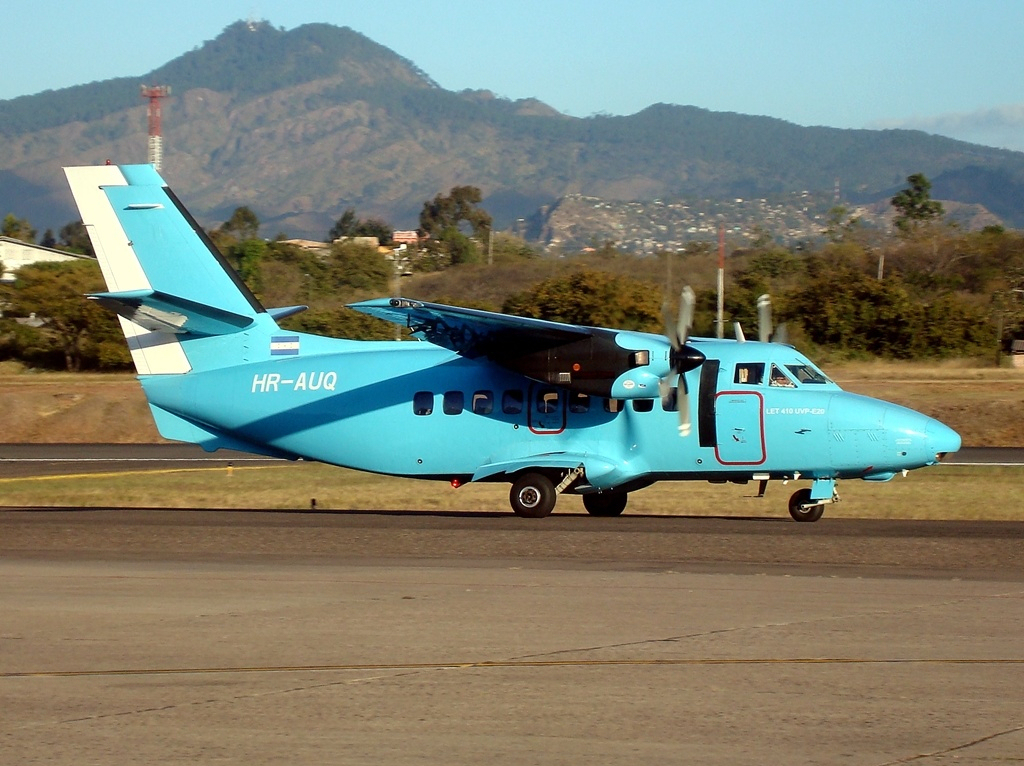
A Central American Let L-410 Turbolet in 2010. This exact aircraft crashed as Flight 731 a year later.

Central American Airways was an airline based in Honduras.

== History ==
The airline was founded in March 2008, and in 2010 began flying to several different destinations within Honduras. On February 14, 2011, a Let L-410 Turbolet operating Central American Airways Flight 731 crashed on approach to Toncontín International Airport, Tegucigalpa. All 14 people aboard were killed in the accident. It ceased operations on September 1, 2011, with EasySky purchasing all shares of the airline later.

== See also ==
- List of defunct airlines of Honduras
