= Directorate General for Civil Aviation (Croatia) =

The Republic of Croatia Directorate General for Civil Aviation (DGCA, Croatian: Uprava zračnog prometa) was a government agency of Croatia, headquartered in Zagreb. It manages aspects of civil aviation in Croatia.

Under the Act on Amendments to the Air Traffic Act of the 25th of April 2007, its functions were transferred to the Croatian Civil Aviation Agency
