= Dirección General de Aviación Civil =

Dirección General de Aviación Civil (Spanish for "Directorate General of Civil Aviation") can refer to:

- Dirección General de Aviación Civil (Costa Rica), the national civil aviation authority of Costa Rica
- Dirección General de Aviación Civil (Ecuador), the national civil aviation authority of Ecuador
- Dirección General de Aviación Civil (Spain), the national civil aviation authority of Spain

See also

- Dirección General de Aeronáutica Civil (disambiguation), Spanish for "Directorate General of Civil Aeronautics," the national civil aviation authority of various Spanish-speaking countries
- Directorate General of Civil Aeronautics (disambiguation), the name of the national civil aviation authority of various countries
- Directorate General of Civil Aviation (disambiguation), the name of the national civil aviation authority of various countries
