= Directorate General of Civil Aviation (Chile) =

Civil aviation authority of Chile

- Dirección General de Aeronáutica Civil

Agency overview
- Formed: March 1930
- Jurisdiction: Government of Chile
- Headquarters: Providencia, Santiago, Chile; 33°26′S 70°37′W
- Agency executive: Victor Villalobos Collao, General Director
- Website: www.dgac.gob.cl

Footnotes
- Sources: DGAC

The Directorate General of Civil Aviation or the Directorate General of Civil Aeronautics of Chile (Spanish: Dirección General de Aeronáutica Civil) is the civil aviation authority of Chile. It has its headquarters in Providencia, Santiago. The Directorate was created in March 1930, following the setup of the Chilean Air Force.

The body is presided by a general director, and organised into twelve Departments and a Directorate of Meteorology. Apart from overseeing all aspects of civil aviation within the Chilean territory, it provides additional services not directly related to regulating and controlling the civil aviation industry, such as meteorological services for navigational purposes. As of 22 January 2020, the General Director is Air Mshl Victor Villalobos Collao.

The Departamento de Prevención de Accidentes investigates air accidents and incidents.

== See also ==
- List of civil aviation authorities
