= Transaviabaltika =

Lithuanian airline

IATA	ICAO	Call sign
—	KTB	TRANSBALTIKA
- Founded: 1998
- Commenced operations: 1998
- Fleet size: 2
- Destinations: charter
- Headquarters: Kaunas Airport
- Website: transaviabaltika.lt

Transaviabaltika is a Lithuanian charter airline based at Kaunas Airport.

== Operations ==
Transaviabaltika provided PSO services to the island of Hiiumaa in Estonia until 2023. Transaviabaltika also operates Savonlinna - Helsinki - Savonlinna PSO passenger routing on daily basis, as well as Helsinki - Tallinn - Helsinki passenger charter flights. The company terminated their Savonlinna - Helsinki - Savonlinna PSO contract in early December 2022, with last flights taking place on 16 December 2022.

The airline previously provided various charter cargo flights in Europe for UPS Airlines, TNT and DHL Aviation.

== Destinations ==
=== Estonia ===
- Kärdla Airport (passenger flights, air taxi)
- Tallinn Airport (passenger flights, air taxi)

=== Finland ===
- Savonlinna Airport (passenger flights, air taxi)
- Helsinki-Vantaa Airport (passenger flights, air taxi)

== Fleet ==
=== Current fleet ===
As of July 2026, Transaviabaltika operates the following aircraft:

Aircraft	In service	Orders	Notes
Jetstream 31	1	—	
Jetstream 32	1	—	
Total	2	—	

=== Former fleet ===
As of August 2025, TransAviaBaltika operated 1 Jetstream 31 and 1 Jetstream 32.
