= CORPAC =

CORPAC S.A.
- Company type: Sociedad Anónima
- Industry: Transport
- Founded: June 25, 1943
- Headquarters: Lima, Peru
- Products: Airport operations and services
- Website: www.corpac.gob.pe

The Peruvian Corporation of Commercial Airports and Aviation Inc. (CORPAC) (Spanish: Corporación Peruana de Aeropuertos y Aviación Comercial) is a Peruvian state-owned entity which operates various airports in Peru. It was founded by law (Decreto Legislativo No. 99 - Ley de CORPAC S.A) in June 1943.

== See also ==
- Aeropuertos del Perú
- Lima Airport Partners
