= Directorate General of Civil Aviation (Turkey) =

- Sivil Havacılık Genel Müdürlüğü
- Abbreviation: SHGM
- Formation: 1954; 72 years ago
- Type: Governmental organization
- Headquarters: Maltepe, Ankara
- Director General: Prof. Dr. Kemal YUKSEK
- Parent organization: Ministry of Transport and Infrastructure (Turkey)
- Website: http://web.shgm.gov.tr

Turkish Civil Aviation Authority or legally Directorate General of Civil Aviation (Turkish: Sivil Havacılık Genel Müdürlüğü), is the aviation regulator for Turkey. The organization formed in 1954 and handles the registration of unmanned aerial vehicles and civil aircraft. The organization also conducts the investigations of aviation accidents in the airspace of Turkey.

== Investigations ==
- Atlasjet Flight 4203
