= Aviatsa =

Honduran airline

IATA	ICAO	Call sign
-	VVT	-
- Founded: October 9, 2015
- Hubs: Toncontín International Airport
- Fleet size: 2
- Destinations: 2
- Founder: Felix Francisco Pacheco Reyes
- Website: https://aviatsa.hn/

Aviatsa S.A. de C.V. (legally La Aerolínea Aviación Tecnológica) is a Honduran charter airline that was established on October 9, 2015, after obtaining an air operator's certificate by the Honduran Aviation Authorities earlier the same year. In February 2024, the airline announced its intention to open a commercial route that would connect the cities of Havana, Cuba and San Pedro Sula in Honduras. There have been no updates on this as of March, 2024.

== Destinations ==
As of February 2022, Aviatsa operates the following schedule destinations:

Country	City	Airport	Notes
Honduras	Roatán	Juan Manuel Gálvez International Airport	
Honduras	Tegucigalpa	Toncontín International Airport	Hub

== Fleet ==
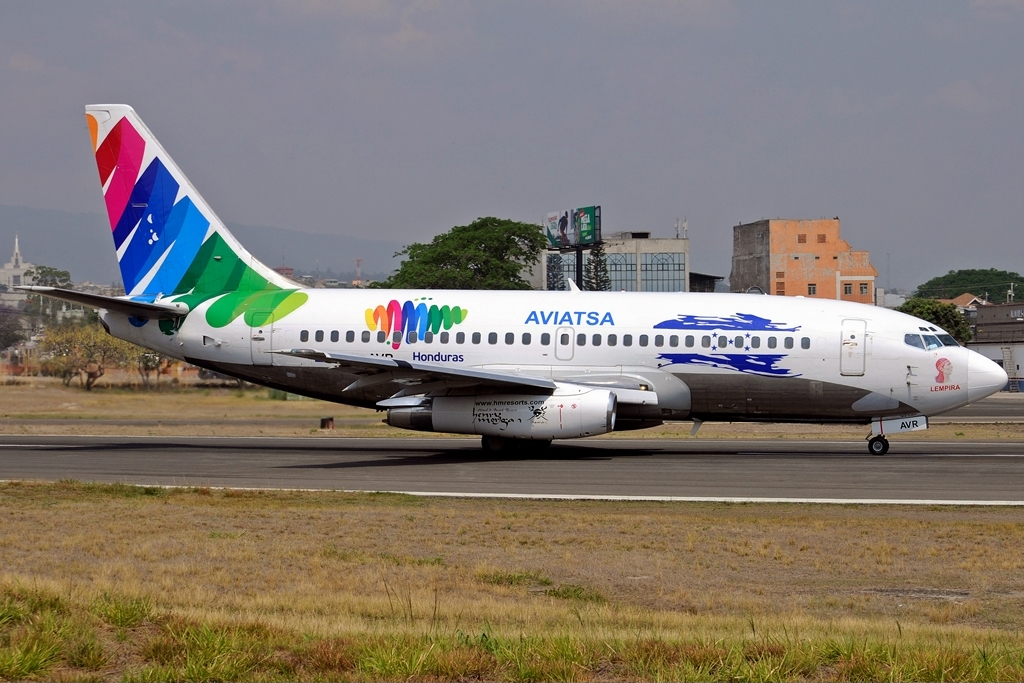
HR-AVR, a Boeing 737-200, one of two aircraft operated by Aviatsa, seen at Toncontín International Airport in 2017

=== Current fleet ===
As of July 2026, Aviatsa operates the following aircraft:

Aviatsa fleet
Aircraft	In service	Orders	Passengers	Notes
Boeing 737-200	2	—	120	
Total	2	—		

=== Former fleet ===
As of August 2025, Aviatsa operated 2 Boeing 737-200

== Legal problems ==
The airline has been investigated for allegedly receiving a US$113,000 bribe to open a route to Islas de la Bahia in Honduras, as part of a larger investigation known in Honduras as the "Pandora Case" or "Caso Pandora".

== See also ==
- List of airlines of Honduras
