= Florence K (steamboat) =

American steamboat built in 1903

- Beeline ex Florence K

History
- Name: Florence K
- Port of registry: Port Townsend, Washington
- Route: Puget Sound
- Completed: 1903
- In service: 1903
- Identification: 121282
- Fate: Probably scrapped, post-1945.

General characteristics
- Type: Inland steamboat; later steam ferry
- Tonnage: as built: 143 gross; 97 regist.
- Length: as built: 93 ft (28.35 m); later: 97 ft (29.57 m)
- Beam: as built: 20 ft (6.10 m); later:26 ft (7.92 m)
- Depth: 6.5 ft (1.98 m) depth of hold
- Installed power: steam engine
- Propulsion: propeller
- Capacity: as ferry: 18 automobiles.
- Notes: Rebuild as steam ferry in 1924 and renamed Gloria. Renamed Beeline in 1926.

Florence K was a steamboat that was operated on Puget Sound from 1903. This vessel was later renamed Gloria and was rebuilt as a steam ferry and renamed Beeline.

== Career ==
Florence K was built at Tacoma, Washington in 1903 for E.L. "Cap" Franks and his associates who were doing business as Eagle Harbor Transportation Co. Among the principals of the company was Capt. J.A. Jensen (1851–1933), who had been in charge of the Quartermaster Harbor drydock when it was the only such drydock on Puget Sound.

== Steamboat inspection failure ==
Steamboat safety regulations were strict in theory in 1903, but loosely enforced. Following the sinking, in January 1904, of the Clallam, where a variety of safety rules had been violated, the steamboat inspectors swept through the Puget Sound steamboat fleet, fining sixteen vessels, including Florence K $750, a considerable sum then, for various safety deficiencies.

The safety deficiencies included inadequate fog horns; rather a steam driven horn, the vessels were using hand-held tin horns driven by a hand-bellows, or a weak manual horn simply blown by mouth, insufficient fire axes and fire buckets, not enough oars in the lifeboats, no plugs in the lifeboat drains, lack of life preserver notices and instructions, no load capacity marked on lifeboats, and boat falls and davits in poor condition. Inspectors strictly counted the total numbers of persons boarded on each vessel, and gave notice that there would be no more remissions of fines for equipment defects. (It had been the custom that heavy fines imposed on steamboats would be remitted upon a showing of compliance by the vessel's owners.)

== Operations ==
Florence K was placed on a route from Tacoma to Vashon Island running with Sentinel. Florence K was also placed on the Seattle-Winslow route for the Eagle Harbor Transportation Co., until 1915 when the company put the new steamer Bainbridge on the route, and shifted Florence K to the Seattle – Port Washington route. Like many other Puget Sound steamers, Florence K used Pier 3 (now Pier 54) as its Seattle terminal.

Florence K. was the first vessel on the scene at the sinking, following a collision, of the steamer Dix, in Elliott Bay on November 18, 1906. Forty-five people drowned, and the Dix sinking remains one of the worst transportation disasters in the history of the state of Washington. Florence, under the command of Capt. Cyprian T. Wyatt (1877–1952) and chief engineer, E.L. Franks, picked up the first survivors and took them to Port Blakely. It is reported that at some point Florence K was acquired by Kitsap County Transportation Co.

In 1922, one of the crewmen of Florence K was Reed O. Hunt (later chairman of the board of Crown Zellerbach Corporation witnessed from the Florence K the tragic drowning of his cousins, Ward Hunt, who had fallen off a freight boat, the Burro on the east side of Point Defiance.

== Steam ferry ==
In 1924, Florence K was reconstructed as a ferry, but still under steam power, by A.R. Hunt, one of the Hunt Brothers, and renamed Gloria. A.M. Hunt & Sons, one of the many Hunt family shipping concerns, operated Gloria on the Tacoma – Vashon Island – Gig Harbor route under lease to Pierce County, Washington.

As rebuilt, Gloria could ship 18 automobiles. In 1923 Capt. Harry Crosby, one of the pioneers of the Puget Sound ferry fleet, bought Gloria from A.R. Hunt and renamed the ferry Beeline. Crosby was then engaged in a rate war with the powerful Puget Sound Navigation and Kitsap County Transportation companies. PSN charged $2.00 for one-way and $2.50 round trip for their run from Seattle to Bremerton (called the "Navy Yard Route."). The KCTC rerouted their boats to run out to Vashon Island from Fauntleroy rather than Seattle, and reduced their fares to $1.00 each way for car and driver. Cosby reduce rates to 50 cents each way for car and driver. PSN and KCTC then went to the Public Utilities Commission, and were able to force Crosby to raise his rates to 85 cents one way, and $1.50 round trip.

In June 1926, the rate war was over and the three ferries of the Crosby concern, including Beeline, had been merged into the PSN, although for a time after the merger the Crosby boats operated under the Crosby name.

On December 4, 1926, Beeline was shifted over to the route from Everett to Langley, replacing the ferry Whidby, which was transferred to the run between Mukilteo and Clinton. Capt. Bart Lovejoy was master of the Beeline on the Everett-Langley route. During this time, autobuses picked up passengers and brought them down to Beeline and other ferries.

By this time, the steamboat business on Puget Sound was fading rapidly. Joshua Green, an important early founder of the PSN, and later a prominent banker, left the PSN in 1927 because, in his words, "the steamboat business was rapidly degenerating into the ferry boat business."

== Last years ==
In 1937, Beeline was one of the five remaining wooden-hulled vessels of the Puget Sound Mosquito Fleet, the others being Virginia V, Manitou, Sightseer and Arcadia. Line drawings of five vessels were prepared by Phillip F. Spaulding, then an apprentice to naval architect Carl J. Nordstrom. Nordstrom had a contract from the Works Progress Administration to prepare maritime records for the Historic American Register and Building Survey.

During World War II Beeline was taken over by the U.S. Navy to run between Hadlock and Indian Island. Just what happened to Beeline after the war is not known, but the vessel was probably scrapped.
