= Audrey (disambiguation) =

Audrey is an Anglo-Norman given name from Æðelþryð.

Audrey may also refer to:

== Film ==
- Audrey (1916 film), an American silent drama film
- Audrey (2014 film), an American comedy film
- Audrey (2020 film), a British documentary film about Audrey Hepburn
- Audrey (2024 film), an Australian black comedy film

== Other uses ==
- 3Com Audrey, a short-lived Internet appliance
- Audrey, a painting by Philip Richard Morris
- Audrey (band), a Swedish music group
- Audrey (novel), a best-selling 1902 novel by Mary Johnston
- Audrey (comedy duo), a comedy duo in Japan
- Audrey (tugboat), a 1909 small steam vessel
- Audrey magazine, a U.S. magazine for Asian American women
- Hurricane Audrey, a 1957 hurricane that devastated Louisiana

== Other uses ==
- The Audreys, an Australian music group
