= Florence K =

Florence K may refer to:

- Florence K (singer), Canadian singer
- Florence K (steamboat), a steamboat that was operated on Puget Sound from 1903

== See also ==
- Florence K. Murray (1916–2004), Women's Army Corps officer, and Rhode Island state senator and judge
