= Hunt Brothers (disambiguation) =

Hunt Brothers Pizza is a pizza restaurant chain based in Nashville, Tennessee.

Hunt Brothers or Hunt brothers may also refer to:

- Hunt Brothers (steamboat line), a steamboat line that ran on the Puget Sound
- Silver Thursday, a commodities market crisis caused by three Hunt brothers in an attempt to corner the silver market on March 27, 1980
