= Crest (1900 steamboat) =

1900 steamboat in United States

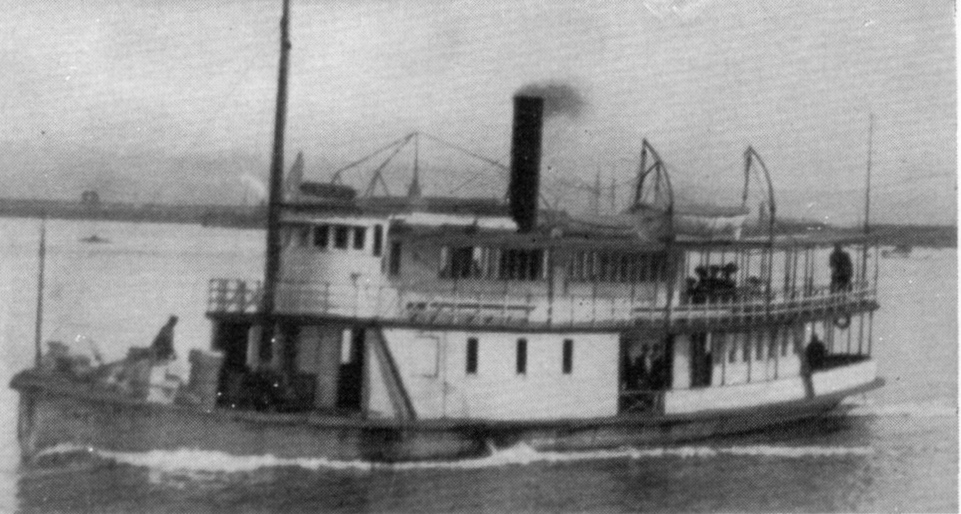
- Crest (later, Bay Island)

History
- Name: Crest; Bay Island
- Owner: Hunt Bros.; Hale Passage & Wollochet Bay Nav. Co.
- Route: Puget Sound
- Completed: 1900
- Fate: Abandoned in 1929

General characteristics
- Tonnage: 99 Gr/67 Reg
- Length: 91.2 ft (27.8 m)
- Beam: 20 ft (6.1 m)
- Depth of hold: 5.9 ft (1.8 m)
- Installed power: steam engine
- Propulsion: propeller

Crest was a wooden steamboat that operated on Puget Sound in the early 1900s. Following a sale of the vessel in May, 1912, this boat was known as Bay Island.

== Career ==
In 1899, the Hunt Brothers, a family steamboat business, had Crest built at Tacoma for service on the Tacoma-Gig Harbor route Crest was built according to a tear drop shaped design, which was originated by the Hunt brothers. While this did not increase the speed of the boat, it allowed the vessel to carry more passengers and cargo at the same speed.

In 1902 the Hunt Brothers divided their interest in the firm's boats, with Emmett Hunt taking ownership of Crest.

In 1912, Emmett Hunt, for $11,500, sold Crest to the Hale Passage and Wollochet Bay Navigation Company, which was a farmer's cooperative seeking a way to lower transport costs on produce. The cooperative renamed the vessel Bay Island. Bay Island made as many as 10 stops along the cooperative's route in Hale Passage and Wollochet Bay, and ran in the evening so the produce cargo would be fresh in the morning at the market.

Bay Island was abandoned in 1929.

== See also ==
- Puget Sound Mosquito Fleet
