= Bay of Islands (disambiguation) =

The Bay of Islands is an area in New Zealand, and:

- Bay of Islands (New Zealand electorate), a former New Zealand electorate

Bay of Islands may also refer to:

- Bay of Islands, Newfoundland and Labrador, Canada
- Bay of Islands (electoral district), a provincial electoral district for the House of Assembly of Newfoundland and Labrador
- Bay of Islands Coastal Park, a coastal reserve in Victoria, Australia

== See also ==
- Bay Islands (disambiguation)
- Island Bay, Wellington
- Bay of Isles
