= Audrey (tugboat) =

1909 steamboat in United States

History
- Owner: Delta V. Smyth (1943–1960); Foss Launch and Tug Company (1960–)
- Route: Puget Sound
- Completed: 1909
- Fate: Sold 1963

General characteristics
- Length: 64 ft (19.5 m)
- Installed power: steam engine; later diesel
- Propulsion: propeller

Audrey was a small steam vessel that operated on Puget Sound in the early part of the 1900s. The vessel was converted to a diesel tug and operated as such for many years on Puget Sound.

== Career ==
Built in 1909, Audrey was used to replace the steamer Crystal on the run from Tacoma to Wollochet Bay in southern Puget Sound. She later served as a grocery carrier for the small south Puget Sound communities of Still Harbor, Anderson Island, Longbranch, and North Bay. Audrey was later converted to a diesel-powered tug. Audrey was used by the Seattle police to locate the body of the victim in a case known as the Mahoney Trunk Murder. In 1943, she was sold to Delta V. Smyth, and in 1960, went to the Foss tug concern with all other Smyth tugs.
