= José Santos Guardiola, Bay Islands =

José Santos Guardiola
- Municipality
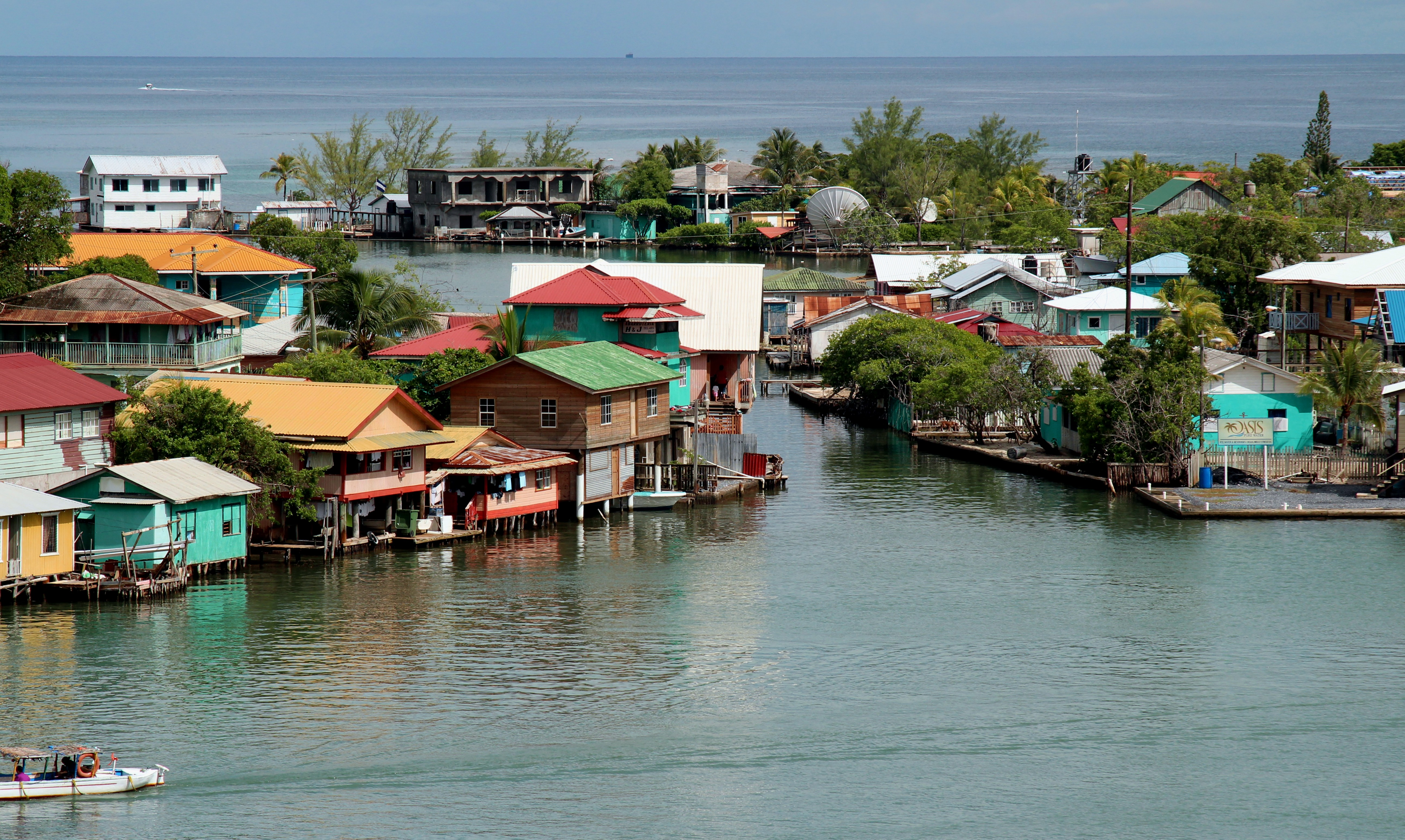
- View of Oakridge

- José Santos Guardiola in the Bay Islands Department

- Location in Honduras
- Coordinates: 16°24′N 86°21′W
- Country: Honduras
- Department: Bay Islands

Government
  - Mayor: Carson Dilbert

Area
  - Total: 64.37 km^{2} (24.85 sq mi)
- Elevation: 235 m (771 ft)

Population (2013)
  - Total: 11,334
  - Density: 176.1/km^{2} (456.0/sq mi)
- Time zone: UTC-6 (CST)

José Santos Guardiola is a municipality in the Bay Islands Department of Honduras. It is located on the island of Roatán. The name of the municipality is in honor of Brigadier General José Santos Guardiola Bustillo, President of Honduras between 1856 and 1862. The capital of the municipality is Oakridge.

The municipality was created by presidential decree, issued in 1960.
