= Plan Grande =

Plan Grande is an archaeological site on the island of Guanaja, Honduras in the department of the bay islands, which consists of an open space delimited by a stone wall inside which irregular mounds of earth and large low rectangular platforms covered with slabs monoliths already fallen can be found.

== History ==
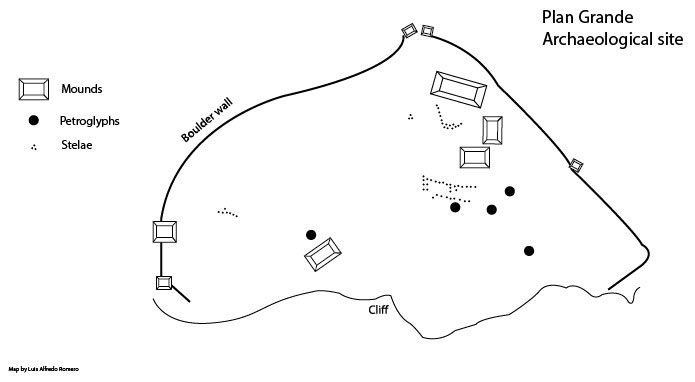
Mapping of the site according the studies done during the 2010s

The Bay Islands were populated mainly by the Pech ethnic group, whose language belongs to the Chibchan family which is mainly distributed in Costa Rica, Panama and Colombia. Following the arrival of the Spanish, those insular Pech fled to land, leaving behind rich evidence of their achievements expressed in monoliths, geoglyphs and petroglyphs. Guanaja has several archaeological sites within which “Plan Grande” stands out. It is difficult to determine when the site was built, although everything indicates that it may have been around the year 600 to 900 AD.

It is possible that it was a cultural and ceremonial center for the Pech since it is surrounded by a pile of stones and the siding of the mounds occurs. This was a plaza possibly the center of a large settlement of this culture. Steles similar to others have been found in other cultures on the coast of the intermediate area. Currently, the site has not been fully explored although the sites have been inventoried and there are studies for the management and protection of the archaeological zones of the islands, however, according to the Honduran Institute of Anthropology and History, this cannot be achieved without the protection and collaboration of local authorities and residents and landowners.

== Discoveries ==
Plan Grande site is distinguished by the presence of a series of platforms and pyramidal structures built in stone, as well as a set of many ceramic artifacts, stone tools and faunal remains that suggest a settlement environment and possible a ceremonial center. The strategic location of Plan Grande, on a hill overlooking the bay, allows us to infer its importance as a control and communication point within the commercial network that connected the Caribbean area with the Mesoamerican one.

Among the most notable findings are many stone platforms that possibly served for religious activities or as spaces for the local elite, as well as a series of tombs and offerings that provide information on the funerary practices and spiritual beliefs of its inhabitants. The ceramic artifacts found at the site present stylistic characteristics that show influences from both the Mayan cultures of the interior of Honduras and the Caribbean populations, suggesting a cultural interaction between different groups.

== See also ==
- Pre Columbian Honduras
- Intermediate area
