= Angeles Brewing and Malting Company =

Defunct American brewery company

- The Angeles brewery, c. 1901–1915, with cordwood stacked nearby
- Company type: Private
- Industry: Brewing
- Founded: 1901
- Defunct: 1915
- Fate: Closed due to Prohibition
- Headquarters: Port Angeles, Washington
- Area served: Puget Sound
- Products: Beer, malt beverages

The Angeles Brewing and Malting Company was a brewery that operated in Port Angeles, Washington, from 1901 until 1915. The company is historically notable for operating the steamboat Albion, which was used to transport kegs of beer around Puget Sound until its sinking in 1910.

== History ==
The company was established in 1901 in Port Angeles to serve the growing communities on the Olympic Peninsula and around Puget Sound. To distribute its products, the company purchased the small steamship Albion, which was used to deliver full kegs of beer to various ports.

In April 1910, the company was placed into receivership. A month later, the Albion was struck in a collision on Puget Sound and sank, resulting in the loss of its primary delivery vessel. Despite these setbacks, Angeles Brewing continued operations until 1915, when statewide Prohibition went into effect, forcing the brewery to close.

== Operations ==
The brewery’s facilities included a malting house and production plant located on the Port Angeles waterfront. Its products were shipped by both sea and land, making it one of the most important regional breweries in western Washington during the early 20th century.

== Legacy ==
While the brewery closed over a century ago, it remains part of the industrial and maritime history of Port Angeles. Historical photographs of the brewery and its shipping dock survive, and the loss of the Albion is noted in Puget Sound maritime records.

== See also ==
- List of defunct breweries in the United States
- History of Washington (state)
