= Bay Islands =

Bay Islands may refer to:

- Bay Islands Department, Honduras
- Southern Moreton Bay Islands, Queensland, Australia

== See also ==
- Bay of Islands
- Bay of Isles
- Island Bay, Wellington
- Little Bay Islands
- Bay Island
