= Hunt Brothers (steamboat line) =

US company

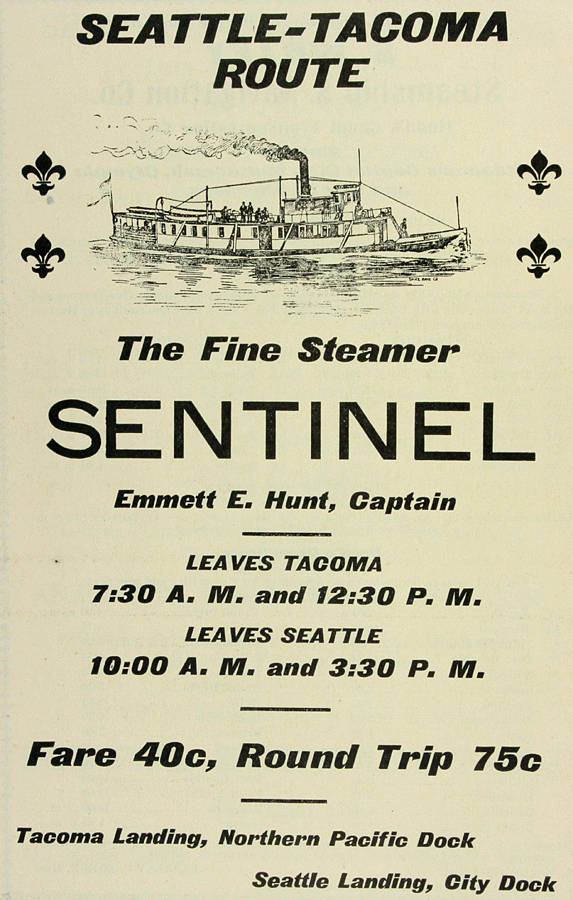
- Advertisement for Hunt Brothers steamer Sentinel
- Founded: 1882
- Defunct: 1927
- Headquarters: Tacoma, Washington

The Hunt Brothers were the owners of a steamboat business that ran on Puget Sound as part of the Puget Sound Mosquito Fleet. Five of the seven Hunt children became owners, engineers and masters of steamboats, these were Emmett E., Arthur M., Arda R., Lloyd.B., and Forest M. Hunt.

== Background ==
The family originally came from Michigan and settled near Wollochet Bay in 1876. They started out in the maritime business when the oldest brother, Emmett E., rowed the mail once a week between Steilacoom and Wollochet Bay, a 20-mile row.

== Course of business ==
In 1882, Emmett E. built a little steamboat, Baby Mine, just 26' long, and his brother Arthur.M. came on board as the engineer. They built or operated for others additional boats including Gypsy Queen, Susie and Victor.

In 1898, the Hunt Brothers had Sentinel built at the Crawford and Reid shipyard in Tacoma, and placed her on the East Pass Route between Tacoma and Seattle. In 1899, they had Crest built at Tacoma for service on the Tacoma-Gig Harbor route

In 1902, the partnership ended, and Emmett Hunt took over the Crest on the Gig Harbor route. and appears to have continued in business until at least 1907 as the Hunt Steamboat Company. Arthur M. Hunt kept Sentinel and the sternwheeler Clara Brown.

In 1905, Arthur M. Hunt and Frank Bibbins formed the Tacoma and Burton Navigation Company. Arthur M. Hunt designed Burton, launched 1905, and Magnolia launched 1908. One authority states that about three years later, Arthur M. Hunt sold both boats (Sentinel going to the newly formed Merchants Transportation Company) and quit the steamboat business. Another authority indicates that Arthur M. Hunt bought out Bibbins' interest in a shipyard on the Puyallup river, where he superintended the construction of boats such as Ariel (1912).

In May 1913, the Hunt Brothers, consisting of Arda R., Arthur M., and Lloyd) launched Atalanta, built at the Marine Supply Company in Tacoma, as a replacement for Crest on the Gig Harbor route. Atalanta was a 147-ton steamer, measuring 111.7' long, 23' on the beam, and 6.7 depth of hold. Captain A.R. Hunt, who had been in command of Ariel on the same route, took over as her skipper. Captain Hunt's son, Reed Hunt, who later became chairman of the board of the Crown Zellerbach corporation, recalled the launching of Atalanta:

Three little boys stood at the bow and sang out in unison, 'I christen thee Atalanta! ... my two cousins and I. In June 1917, I went aboard as a deckhand and spittoon cleaner to help out during the wartime labor shortage. That five-cylinder engine was something. It came from a twin-screw yacht in New York and I can still hear my dad arguing with his brother Arthur that they should have bought both engines -- one for a spare. She cruised rather easily at 18 miles per hour and when we closed off the first cylinder and bypassed live steam to the second etc. she'd hold 22 until the steam ran out.

In 1914, the Hunt Brothers sold Ariel to Henry and Marcus Johnson, who brought her up to Lake Washington to run in the suburban passenger business.

In 1924, Pierce County decided to go into the automobile ferry business and built the 124' City of Tacoma to run between Tacoma and Gig Harbor. Arthur M. Hunt designed the ferry and the Hunt Brothers operated it for the county until 1927, when a new ferry, the Defiance was built at Gig Harbor for the Skansie Brothers and their Washington Navigation Company, who took over operation of ferries for Pierce County on the Tacoma, Gig Harbor and Vashon Island runs.
