= Coxen Hole =

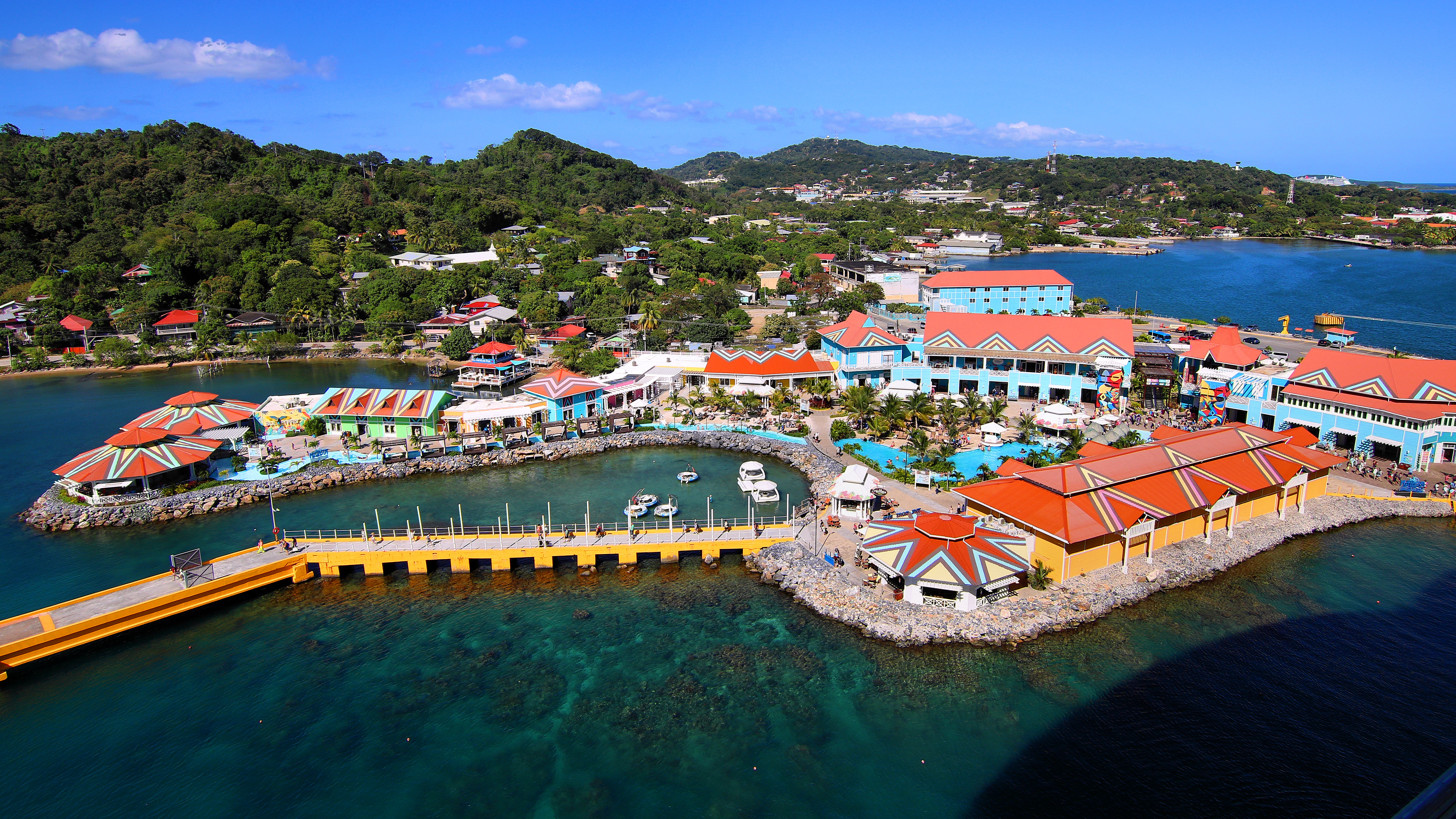
- Coxen Hole, Roatan

- Location within Honduras
- Coordinates: 16.323°N 86.537°W
- Country: Honduras
- Department: Bay Islands

Population (2021)
  - Total: 8,307

Coxen Hole is the largest city on the island of Roatán, and the capital of the Bay Islands department of Honduras, with a population of 8,307 as of the 2021 census. It is also the location of the island's Juan Manuel Gálvez International Airport.

== History ==
=== Background ===
The first records indicating permanent English settlements in the Bay Islands show that Port Royal, on the island of Roatán, was again occupied in the year 1742. In this year the British made an attempt to gain possession of most of the Caribbean coast of Central America, and in doing so, rebuilt the old fort on Roatán. The archives at Belize record a Major Caulfield in command of Roatán as early as 1745. On August 2 of that year, the Major wrote a letter to a Mr. Edward Trelawny, Governor of Jamaica, describing Spanish harassment of English settlements. These settlements appear to have been well established on the island of Roatán by 1775.

=== Foundation ===
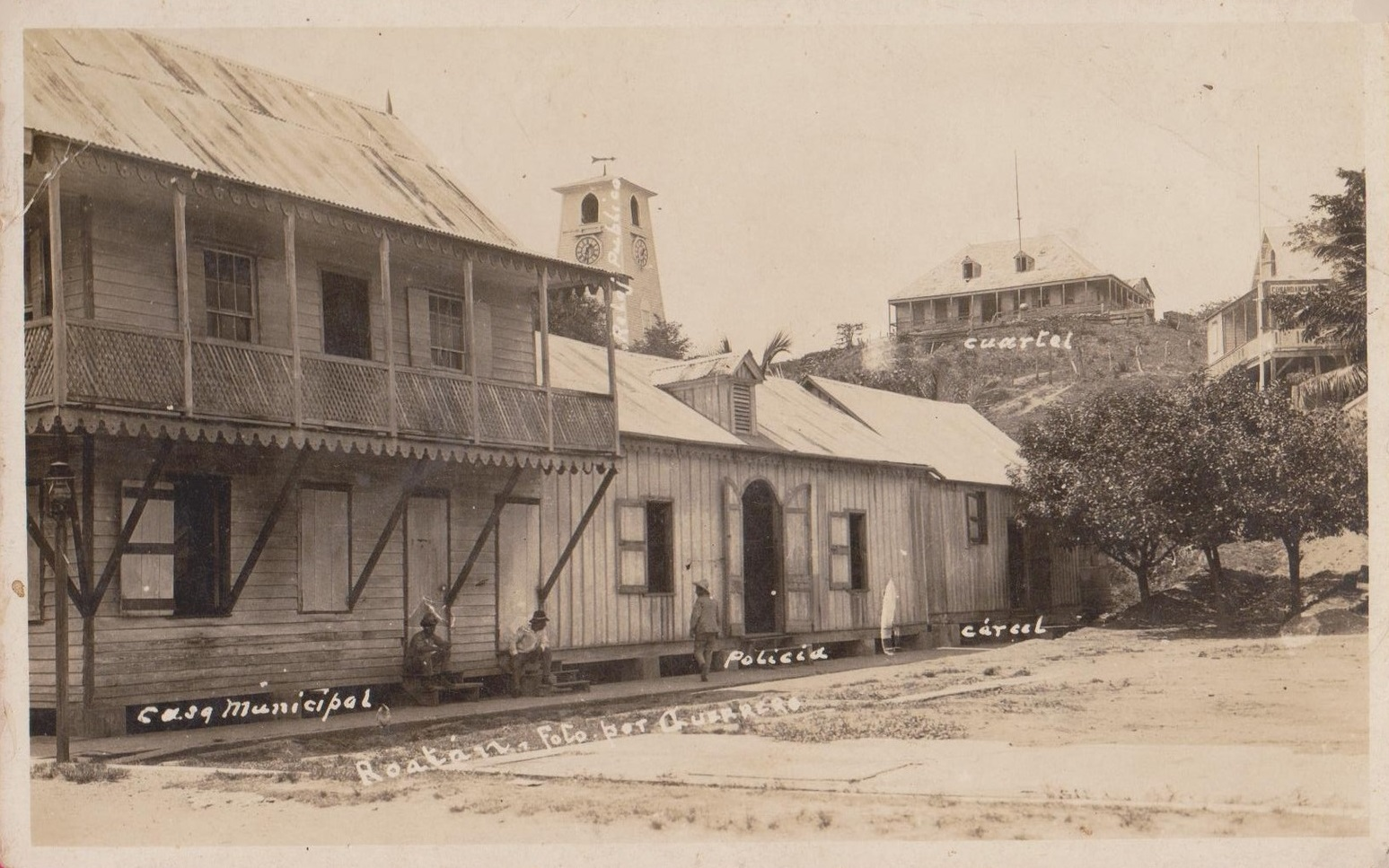
Coxen Hole in 1910.

The city was founded in 1835 when several British families moved to Roatán from the Cayman Islands. It is named after the pirate Captain John Coxen due to the fact that during the 17th century Roatán was once home to over 5,000 pirates living all through the island. British Caymanian slave-owners brought their slaves and seafaring culture to Roatan, forming a majority of the island’s permanent population. The Bay Islands were briefly declared a colony by the British empire in the 1850s, though the territory was ceded to Honduras in the following decade.

After the acquisition of the Bay island colony through the Wyke-Cruz Treaty, all British settlers changed their nationality to Honduran. The “Banana Republic” era of the fruit trade industry in the late 1800s bolstered American and European presence in the region. As such, various dialects of English remain the primary language of the Bay Islands.

=== Modern day ===
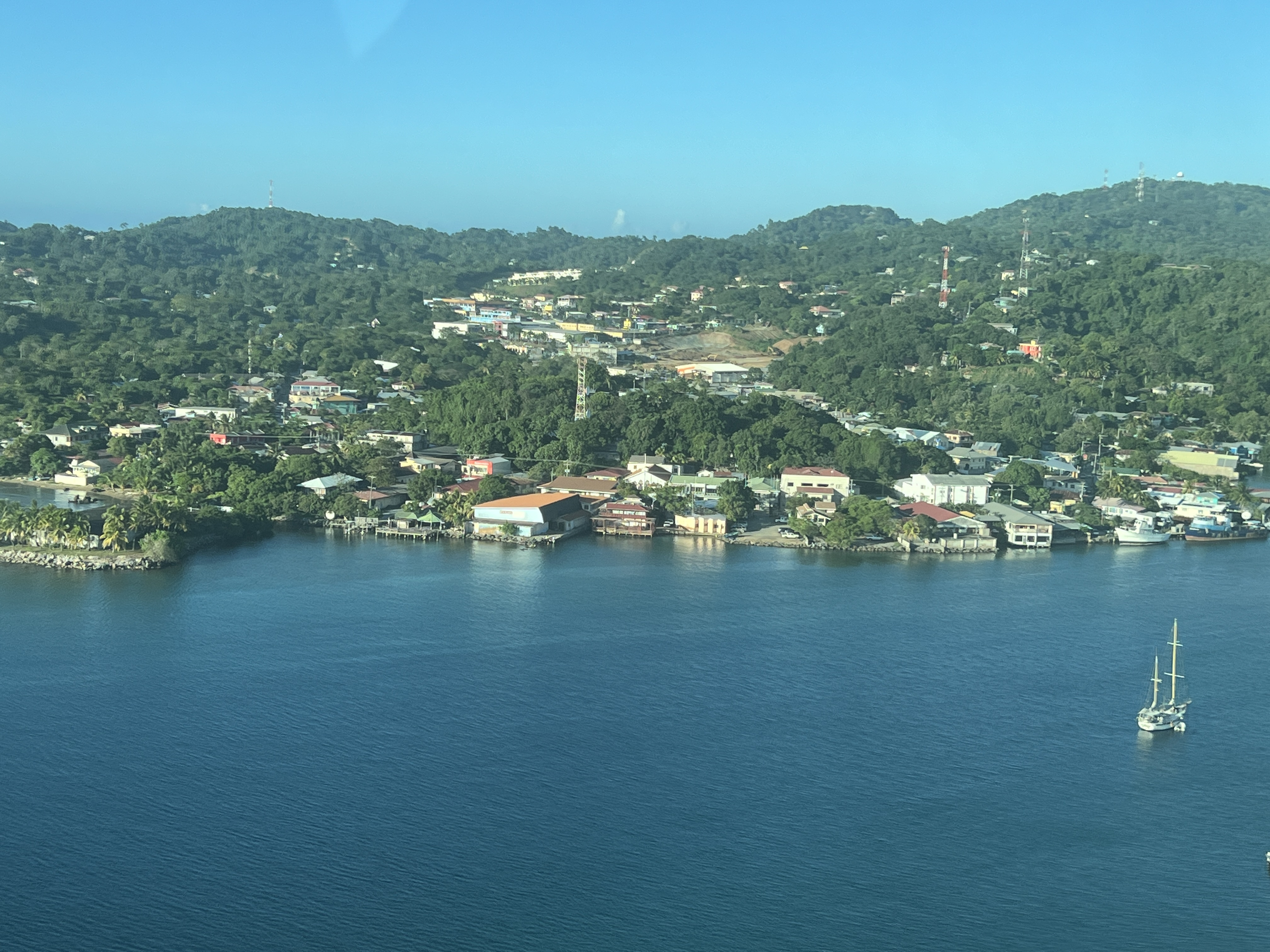
View of the modern day town.

Coxen Hole is the biggest city in the Bay Islands. Bus service connects Coxen Hole with other points on the island. Coxen Hole Stadium is located in the town. There is also a small hospital, Woods Medical Facility.
