= Albion (steamboat) =

19th century steamboat

- Albion and other steamers at Galbraith dock (now Pier 54), Seattle, circa 1904.

History
- Name: Albion
- Builder: Harry Barthtop and several others.
- Completed: 1898
- Identification: US registry #107443
- Fate: Destroyed by fire 1924

General characteristics
- Type: inland steamboat
- Tonnage: 155 gross; 101 regist.
- Length: 94.2 ft (28.71 m)
- Beam: 19 ft (5.79 m)
- Depth: 4.9 ft (1.49 m) depth of hold
- Installed power: compound steam engine, 77 indicated horsepower; converted to diesel in 1924.
- Propulsion: propeller
- Crew: seven (7).

Albion was a steamboat which ran on Puget Sound from 1898 to 1924.

For part of its existence, Albion served as a beer delivery vessel for Washington state's Angeles Brewing and Malting Company. It was involved in a 1910 collision with the steamship Chippewa.

== Career ==
Albion was built at Coupeville, Washington by Capt. H.B. Lovejoy, who intended the vessel to be sold for service on the Yukon River according to one source or Cook Inlet according to another. Power was supplied by an innovative compound steam engine devised by R.D. Ross.

According to a news report from 1910, Albion was actually taken up to Cook Inlet, but it was found that the headwaters of the inlet were too shallow to allow the vessel to operate, and so the ship was returned to Puget Sound. Albion was placed on the route from Seattle to Coupeville. Albion was the first steamer on the Seattle-Everett-Whidbey Island route.

Lovejoy sold Albion to J.B. Treadwell in 1903, and he took the vessel on one trip to Cook Inlet in Alaska. In 1906, Albion was sold to the Merchants Transportation Company, a Tacoma firm. In 1907, Albion was sold again, this time to the Angeles Brewing and Malting Company, and in this capacity was engaged to haul cargos of beer from Port Angeles to Seattle and other cities, as well as haul freight and carry passengers to Port Angeles

== Collision with Chippewa ==
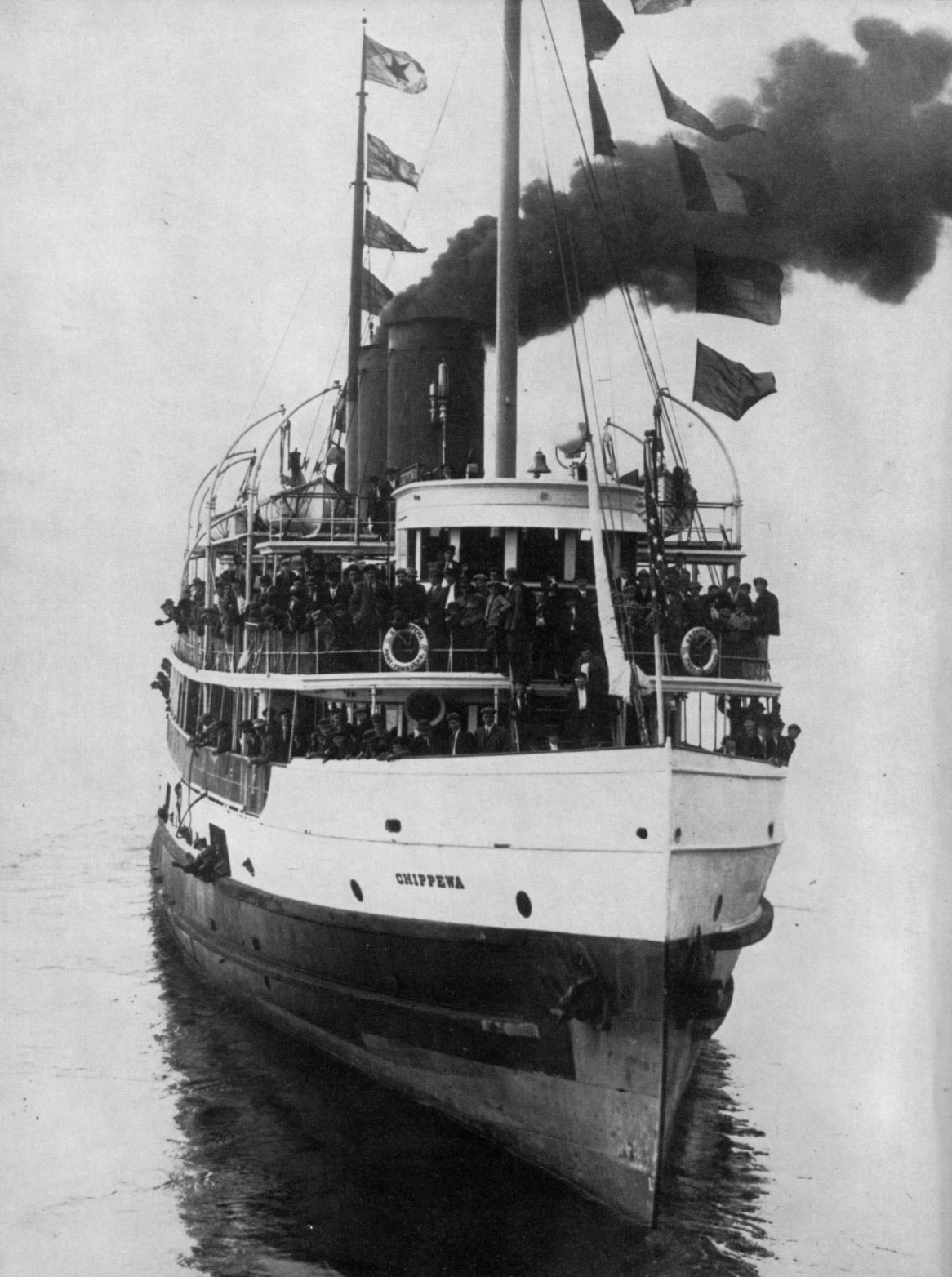
Chippewa circa 1910. Chippewa struck Albion full amidships at just about this angle.

On August 2, 1910, at about 11:00, Albion was involved in a collision with the much larger, steel-hulled steamer Chippewa. At 906 gross tons, Chippewa was six times the size of Albion. Chippewa was coming from Bellingham, Washington to Seattle and had reached the West Point at the northern entrance to Elliott Bay when the collision occurred. Albion was then en route from Seattle to Port Angeles, and many of her passengers were asleep in cabins at the time of the collision.

The pilot of Albion saw Chippewa but for some reason misunderstood Chippewa's signals as to which way to turn to avoid collision. Chippewa blew two whistle blasts, which meant “pass to port” but instead Albion turned the other way into Chippewa's path. The steamer Vashonian was nearby on a parallel course with Chippewa and narrowly avoided being involved in the collision.

The full force of Chippewa's steel bow stem struck the wooden-hulled Albion amidships square on. No one was killed, and all of Albion's passengers were taken on board Chippewa. Albion was heavily damaged. Towed to the beach, Albion was nearly submerged at low tide. One of the passengers, identified as Mrs. William Smith, of Centralia, Washington, a mother with three small children on board, described the collision as follows:

The children were asleep in the berths, and I was lying awake, listening to the sounds on the boat and wondering which part of the Sound we were on. Suddenly there came a signal shrill whistle from our boat, and I jumped up and looked out of the window. There was a big boat, bearing directly down on us. She blew four times and began to back. But still she came ahead towards us, and I could see she was going to cut into us. I don't know what I thought or did. I watched her coming on, and it seemed as if she went slowly, but still so fast. Then she ground into us, and I ran to my baby. The boat broke in all the side of the room, and the sound of smashing timbers and glass with the shock of the impact almost made me sick. To add to the confusion, there were the shouts of the officers and the crew. The cries of my little boys and girl. The children were bruised by the collision, and none of us were able to save any clothing or any other personal belongings.

By August 6, 1910, salvors under Capt. E.C. Generoux had reached Albion and expected to raise the vessel that day, with the plan being to move it to East Waterway at Seattle for repair. Albion's cargo, approximately 45 tons worth, was still on board, but mostly irreparably damaged as a result of the vessel's submersion. There was $3,500 worth of damage to Albion.

Later it turned out that Albion was carrying passengers (of which there were 7 or 8 on board), without the legally required passenger certificate. This caused some controversy, particularly in light of the fact that Albion's cargo included “much”gasoline and dynamite. In subsequent legal action, the owners of Albion were able to prevail against the Chippewa as to which vessel was at fault.

== Later history ==
Prohibition caused Albion to be laid up for several years. Eventually Albion was bought by W.A. Lowman, who replaced the original (and unusual) compound steam engine with a more conventional design. The original compound engine was then installed in the steam tug Sound.

In 1923, Albion went to Capt. Martin Heffner, doing business as the Bremerton Towboat Company. In 1924, Heffner converted Albion to a combination cannery tender and fuel tanker. The vessel was rebuilt to be able to hold 80 tons of fish and 17,000 gallons of fuel. A 110 horsepower (82 kW) Atlas diesel was installed to replace the steam engine. Under Heffner and Capt. R. Andrus, Albion was used to serve the fishing fleet in the Cape Flattery area.

However, Albion did not last long as a cannery tender. In September 1924, an overheated exhaust pipe started a fire. Capt. Edward Meagher and Walter G. McKay were the only two persons on board. They barely escaped with their lives, but the vessel was a total loss.
