= Crystal (steamboat) =

Steamboat

- Crystal

History
- Name: Crystal
- Route: Puget Sound
- Completed: 1904

General characteristics
- Tonnage: 25
- Length: 45 ft (13.7 m)
- Installed power: steam engine
- Propulsion: propeller
- Notes: converted to gasoline power

The steamboat Crystal operated in the early 1900s as part of the Puget Sound Mosquito Fleet.

== Career ==
Crystal was a typical small steamer of the type that served small communities along Puget Sound. Crystal was built at Gig Harbor in 1904 for Miles Coffman. Crystal was propeller-driven, 45' long, and rated at 25 tons. Captain Coffman placed Crystal on the run between Tacoma and Wollochet Bay, until she was replaced on this run by Audrey. After that, Crystal was repowered with a 50 horsepower (37 kW) gasoline engine and transferred to Port Angeles.
