= Victor (1893 steamboat) =

1893 steamboat in United States

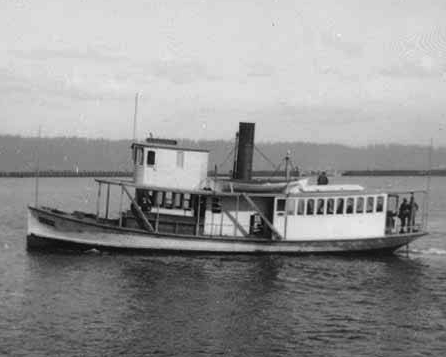
- Victor

History
- Owner: Hunt Brothers
- Route: Puget Sound
- Completed: 1893, Tacoma

General characteristics
- Length: 60 ft (18.3 m)
- Installed power: steam engine, later diesel
- Propulsion: propeller

Victor was a steam-powered tugboat built in 1893 in Tacoma, Washington. This vessel should not be confused with the similarly named Victor II, also active in Puget Sound.

== Career ==
Victor was active in Puget Sound and was operated, at least for a time, by the Hunt Brothers, a family of steamboat owners and operators. As of the year 1900, the vessel was employed on the route from Tacoma to Gig Harbor in southern Puget Sound. At some point the vessel was converted to diesel power.

== See also ==
- Puget Sound Mosquito Fleet
