= Clara Brown (steamboat) =

1886 steamboat in United States

- Clara Brown under way.

History
- Name: Clara Brown
- Owner: Brown Wharf and Navigation Company; Hunt Bros.
- Route: Puget Sound
- Builder: Hiram Doncaster
- Completed: 1886
- Out of service: 1907 (or 1930)
- Identification: US registry 126378
- Fate: Abandoned on beach in West Seattle.

General characteristics
- Tonnage: 190.93 gross, 111.86 registered
- Length: 99.8 ft (30.4 m)
- Beam: 22.1 ft (6.7 m)
- Depth: 4.1 ft (1.2 m) depth of hold
- Installed power: steam engines
- Propulsion: sternwheel

Clara Brown was a sternwheel steamboat of the Puget Sound Mosquito Fleet which operated from the late 1880s to the early 1900s, and possibly as late as 1930.

== Career ==
Clara Brown was built in 1886 by Hiram Doncaster, for Capt. Thomas Brown, the owner of the Brown Wharf and Navigation Company. The vessel was named for Captain Brown's daughter. The vessel was placed in service on the Henderson Bay route in south Puget Sound and surrounding areas, serving communities such as Olympia, Kalmiche, Shelton, Steilacoom, Tacoma, and Seattle. The vessel became famous as the first one to reach Seattle with relief supplies after the great Seattle file in June 1889.
