= Hale Passage and Wollochet Bay Navigation Company =

Defunct American steamship company

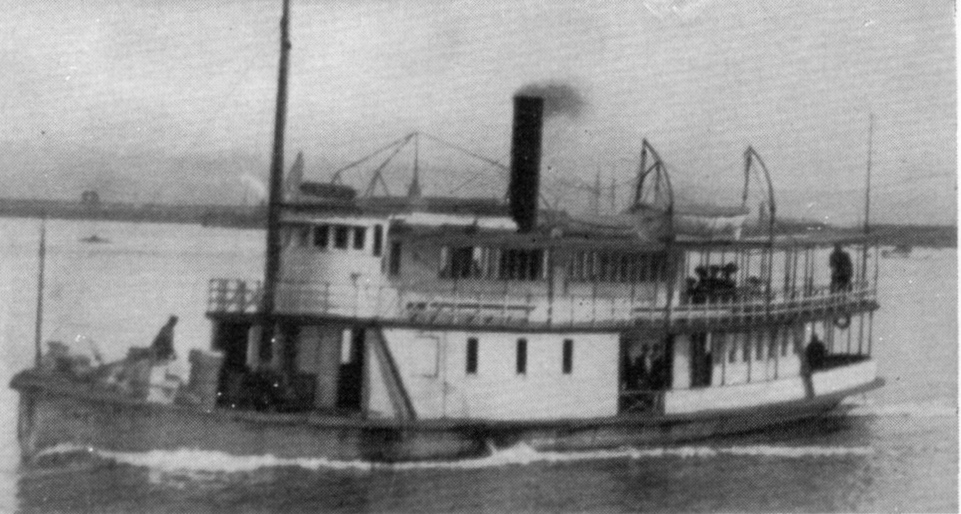
- The steamer Crest later renamed Bay Island.
- Founded: 1912

The Hale Passage and Wollochet Bay Navigation Company was a cooperative formed in 1912 by a group of 120 farmers for the purpose of pooling their resources to save shipping costs by purchasing a steamboat to ship their produce to market. The cooperative also intended to change the steamer's schedule to better fit the farmer's needs. In May 1912, the company bought the propeller steamer Crest from the Tacoma and Burton Navigation Company for $11,500. The company renamed the vessel Bay Ocean and hired Capt. Thomas Torgeson to run the vessel on a daily route between Arletta, Washington and Tacoma, stopping at ten intermediate landings along the way.
