= Merchants Transportation Company =

Shipping firm

- Founded: 1905
- Defunct: 1929

The Merchants Transportation Company was a shipping firm that operated on Puget Sound from 1905 to 1929. This company should not be confused with the similarly named Merchants Transportation Company of Olympia, formed in 1874 which is a completely separate firm.

== Organization ==
Merchants Transportation Company was formed in 1905 by F.H. Marvin, A.W. Sterrett, F.H. Wilhelmi, and Capt. Robert McCullough, of Tacoma. In that year purchased the steam freighter T.W. Lake from Puget Sound Navigation Co. The company later acquired the passenger steamboat Sentinel and Anna E. Fay, a former Yukon River steam tug which the company had rebuilt into the freighter A.W. Sterrett.

== Course of business ==
The company was an early rival of the West Pass Transportation Company in competition for business along the route that ran from Tacoma to Seattle along a strait on the west side of Vashon Island, which was called the West Pass or Colvos Passage. This came of that particular route is the West Pass route.

== Labor unrest ==
In 1907 a union movement was growing among the crews of Puget Sound steam vessels, particularly among the engineers, who had formed the Marine Engineers Beneficial Organization. The shipping companies had scheduled a pay decrease to go into effect on January 10, 1907. The engineering association determined to fight this, and threatened to strike. In response, the shipping companies formed a formal association to negotiate with the engineers. F.H. Marvin was the delegate from the Merchants Transportation Company, and was on the board of the directors of the company association as well as the committee to negotiate with the engineers. Two days before the strike was to go into effect, an agreement was reached with the engineers to receive a 10% raise rather than a pay cut.

== Ships owned by company ==
Vessels reported to have been owned by the company include A.W. Sterrett, Albion, Sentinel and T.W. Lake

== Close of business ==
In 1929, all Merchants Transportation Company boats went to Puget Sound Freight Lines.
