= Bay Island =

- Populated place
- Location within the Commonwealth of Virginia Bay Island (the United States)
- Coordinates: 36°54′32″N 76°2′56″W
- Country: United States
- State: Virginia
- Independent city: Virginia Beach
- Time zone: UTC−5 (Eastern (EST))
  - Summer (DST): UTC−4 (EDT)
- ZIP codes: 23451
- Area code: 757

Bay Island is a two mile long island situated in the North Great Neck area of Virginia Beach, Virginia. The island is bordered by Long Creek to the north and Broad Bay to the south, both offshoots of the Lynnhaven River, and is connected to the mainland by the West Great Neck Bridge on the western side of the island. The island traditionally contains two residential neighborhoods: Broad Bay Colony on the western side of the island and Bay Island on the eastern side, although most residents just refer to the entire residential area as Bay Island. The two neighborhoods share a homeowners' association as well as several other community clubs, such as the Garden Club. Children in the neighborhood attend three schools depending on grade level: John B. Dey Elementary School, Great Neck Middle School, and Frank W. Cox High School. The island is susceptible to flooding, especially on the northern and western sides of the island. Due to this, even small hurricanes or tropical storms may cause the need for an entire evacuation of the island, as the roads on the western side flood, blocking the only exit from the island. This can happen even when the rest of Virginia Beach is not affected by a storm.

== See also ==
- Bay Islands
