= Sentinel (steamboat) =

Historic steamboat named Sentinel.

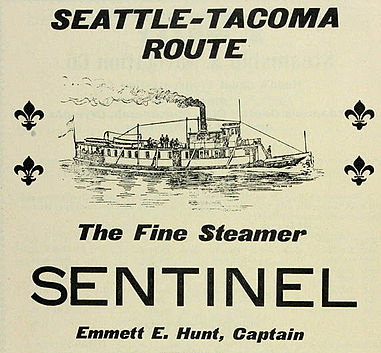
- Advertisement for steamer Sentinel, published 1901.

History
- Name: Sentinel
- Owner: Hunt Bros.; Hansen Trans. Co.; Kitsap County Transportation Company
- Route: Puget Sound
- Completed: 1898
- Out of service: 1928
- Fate: Scrapped 1928

General characteristics
- Length: 100 ft (30 m) (approx.)
- Installed power: steam engine
- Propulsion: propeller

Sentinel was a small wooden propeller-driven steamship of the Puget Sound Mosquito Fleet.

== Career ==
Sentinel was built in 1898 for the Hunt Brothers, who ran a family steamboat business on Puget Sound. The Hunts ran the vessel to stops on Bay Island in southern Puget Sound, and also on a run to Seattle with mail stops on Vashon Island. The vessel was sold to Hansen Transportation Co. in 1903, rebuilt and widened so as to increase passenger capacity from 100 to 250. In 1921 Hansen Transportation sold the vessel to Ed Lorentz. In 1928, the vessel was scrapped and the engine installed in another steamboat, the Arcadia. Sentinel is reported to have belonged to the Kitsap County Transportation Company (KCTC) from 1905 to 1908, and to have been part of KCTC when it was formed.
