= Bay Islands Department =

Department of Honduras

Bay Islands Department Departamento de Islas de la Bahía (Spanish)
- Department
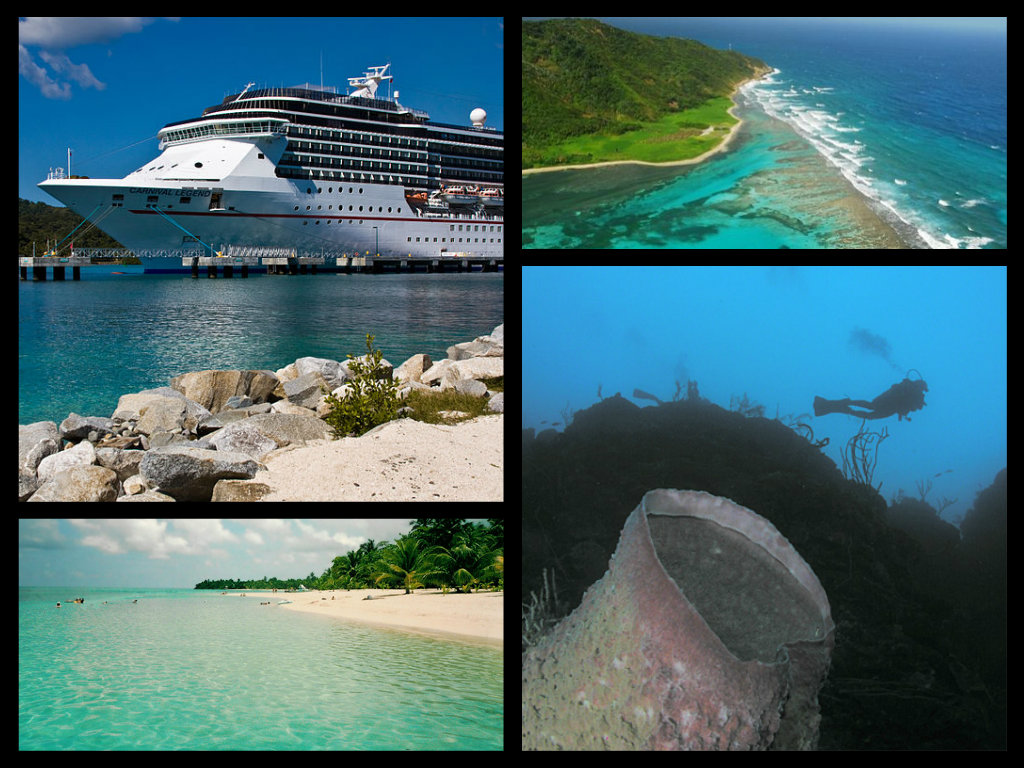

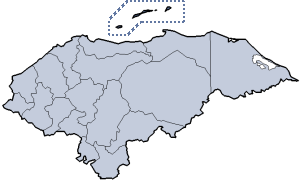
- The Bay Islands in Honduras
- Coordinates: 16°17′27″N 86°24′39″W
- Country: Honduras
- Municipalities: 4: Roatán; Guanaja; José Santos Guardiola; Utila
- Villages: 23
- Founded: 14 March 1872
- Capital city: Coxen Hole
- Largest municip.: Roatán

Government
  - Type: Municipal
  - Governor: Ken McNab (2026–2030) (PNH)

Area
  - Total: 229 km^{2} (88 sq mi)

Population (2020)
  - Total: 110,000
  - Density: 480/km^{2} (1,200/sq mi)

GDP (Nominal, 2015 US dollar)
  - Total: $200 million (2023)
  - Per capita: $2,700 (2023)

GDP (PPP, constant 2015 values)
  - Total: $500 million (2023)
  - Per capita: $5,700 (2023)
- Time zone: UTC-6 (CST)
- Postal code: 34101
- ISO 3166 code: HN-IB
- HDI (2021): 0.652 medium · 3rd of 18
- Statistics derived from Consult INE online database: Population and Housing Census 2013

The Bay Islands (Spanish: Islas de la Bahía; pronounced [ˈislas de la βaˈi.a]) is a group of islands off the Caribbean coast of Honduras. Collectively, the islands form one of the 18 departments of Honduras. The departmental capital is Coxen Hole, on the island of Roatán.

== Geography ==
The Bay Islands consist of eight islands and 53 small cays lying 15 kilometres (10 mi) to 60 kilometres (40 mi) off the northern coast of Honduras. These islands have been administered as a department of the Republic of Honduras since 1872. Located on the Caribbean Sea, not far east of the entrance to the Gulf of Honduras, they are clearly visible from the mountainous mainland.

=== Islands ===
The total surface area of the islands is 250 km^{2} (97 sq mi). In 2013, they had an estimated population of 71,500 people. The islands comprise three separate groups:

1. Swan Islands are the northernmost island group of the three.
2. Islas de la Bahía (with the main islands Roatán, Guanaja and Utila, and numerous satellite islands) are 120 km (75 mi) to the south.
3. Cayos Cochinos are the southernmost island group of the three.

Roatán is the largest island, with a length of about 60 kilometres (40 mi) and a maximum width of 14 kilometres (9 mi) at its widest point. Roatán is characterized by its mountainous backbone, composed of hilltops that run west-to-east across the entire island. These hilltops are often crowned by outcrops of exposed metamorphic rocks such as marble, amphibolite, and serpentine. The island's southern coast has an abundance of deep ports and wide inlets, or 'bights', protected by reefs, while its northern coast is, save for a few narrow passages, largely inaccessible, due to extensive coral reef growth.

The island of Saint Helena has been described as a virtual extension of Roatán, since it is separated only by a long stretch of mangrove swamp. This island has a small elevated hill at its center, and is characterized by a large number of caves, most of which are located along a cliff on its western end.

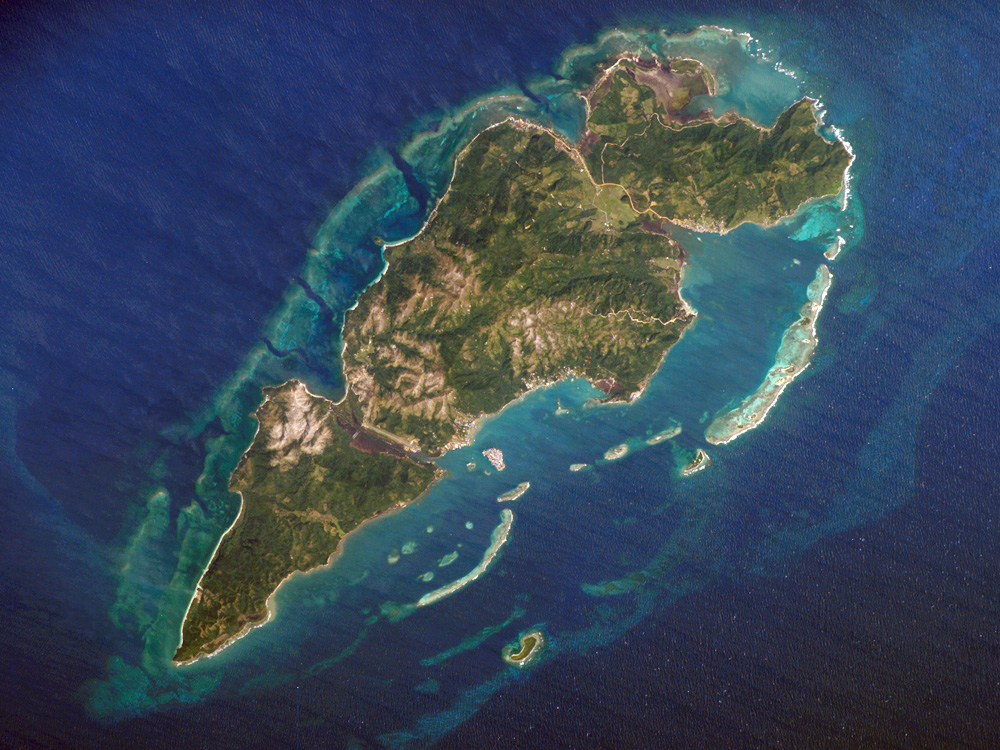
Island of Guanaja

Guanaja is the second largest island and is even more mountainous than Roatán. Geographically it features a series of hills, the highest of which rises to over 350 m above sea level, which is the highest elevation present in the Bay Islands. Alluvial plains characterize the areas between the hills.

Utila is third in size and is characterized by low mangrove swamps and a few small, low hills on its eastern end. The soils on this island are uncharacteristically fertile, perhaps owing to the islands's flat topography as well as volcanic tuffs and basalt lavas through coralline limestone.

Barbareta, Morat, and the Hog Islands are all small and rugged. Barbareta can be distinguished by the fact that it contains numerous hills, the tallest one reaching a height of 143 m (469 ft), above sea level. Approximately one-third of Barbareta is covered by serpentinite, making it the island with the largest deposit of serpentine among the Bay Islands. Morat, the smallest and flattest island, consists of just one ridge with two hills, which are composed mainly of sedimentary rocks, with some serpentinite intrusions.

The Bay Islands have no rivers and a small number of streams, which usually end at mangrove swamps (of which there are plenty on the Islands). There are, however, a large number of cool water springs in the Islands. Roatán features an intricate system of waterways on the south of the island, formed by the salt-water lagoons and drowned valleys on the island.

=== Environment ===
The archipelago has been designated an Important Bird Area (IBA) by BirdLife International because it supports significant populations of white-crowned pigeons, chimney swifts and yellow-naped amazons.

== History ==
=== Pre-Columbian era ===
It is unknown exactly when human presence arrived on the islands, but archaeological studies find an organized presence on the islands long before European colonization. Archaeological sites such as Plan Grande in Guanaja show a level of sophistication and hierarchical organization of these towns throughout the archipelago. The islands served as a bridge between the intermediate area and the Mesoamerican world, since in addition to the presence of Intermediate peoples such as the Pech, evidence of Maya presence and native Nahua speakers has been found.

=== European arrival and early history ===
Columbus’ fourth voyage 1502–1504

The islands were anciently known as Las Guanajas, from Guanaja, first seen by Christopher Columbus in his fourth and last voyage to the New World, on July 30, 1502. The Admiral named it 'Isle of Pines', and claimed it for Spain. It was from this island that he then encountered the coast of the American continent, on which he landed on the 14th of August following, at the point now called Punta Castilla de Trujillo.

Pech Indians inhabited the islands, and they used boats to trade with Honduras, Yucatán, and (allegedly) Jamaica.

Notwithstanding Spanish laws prohibiting slavery, governors interested in the slave trade labeled the Pech Indians cannibals, hostile, and opposed to Christianity. Based on this information, Queen Isabella I of Spain issued a decree granting license to the Spaniards to capture and sell the islanders. Under this decree, Spanish slave traders from Cuba raided the Bay Islands continuously from the time of their discovery for the next 20 years. As a result, the population of the islands rapidly declined.

Diego Velasquez, governor of Cuba, in 1516 formally authorized several companies to trade in Indian slaves. In 1526, Hernán Cortés, who had conquered Mexico, marched to Trujillo to depose a rival conquistador from Cuba. The remaining Pech sought his protection, which Cortés provided. He drove away the slave traders, despite their licenses from the authorities in Cuba.

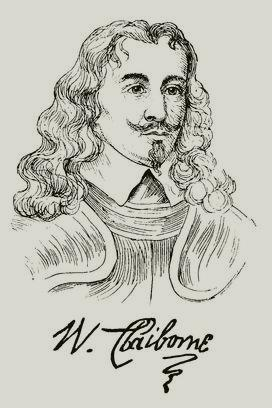
William Claiborne

William Claiborne was the first non-Spanish European to attempt settling the Bay Islands, after being granted a patent in 1638 to begin a colony on the island of Roatán. The English would be involved in the Bay Islands for the next two hundred years.

Around this same period, Dutch, English, and French freebooters were leading raids on the Spanish in the Bay of Honduras. These raids largely avoided Claiborne's settlement.

In 1642, English settlers from British Honduras (modern day Belize) invaded and occupied Port Royal on Roatán. These same settlers also raided the Spanish, provoking an attempt by the Spaniards to drive them out of the colony. This attempt was initially unsuccessful, but in March 1650, the Spanish finally succeeded in retaking Port Royal.

=== English settlers in the Bay Islands ===
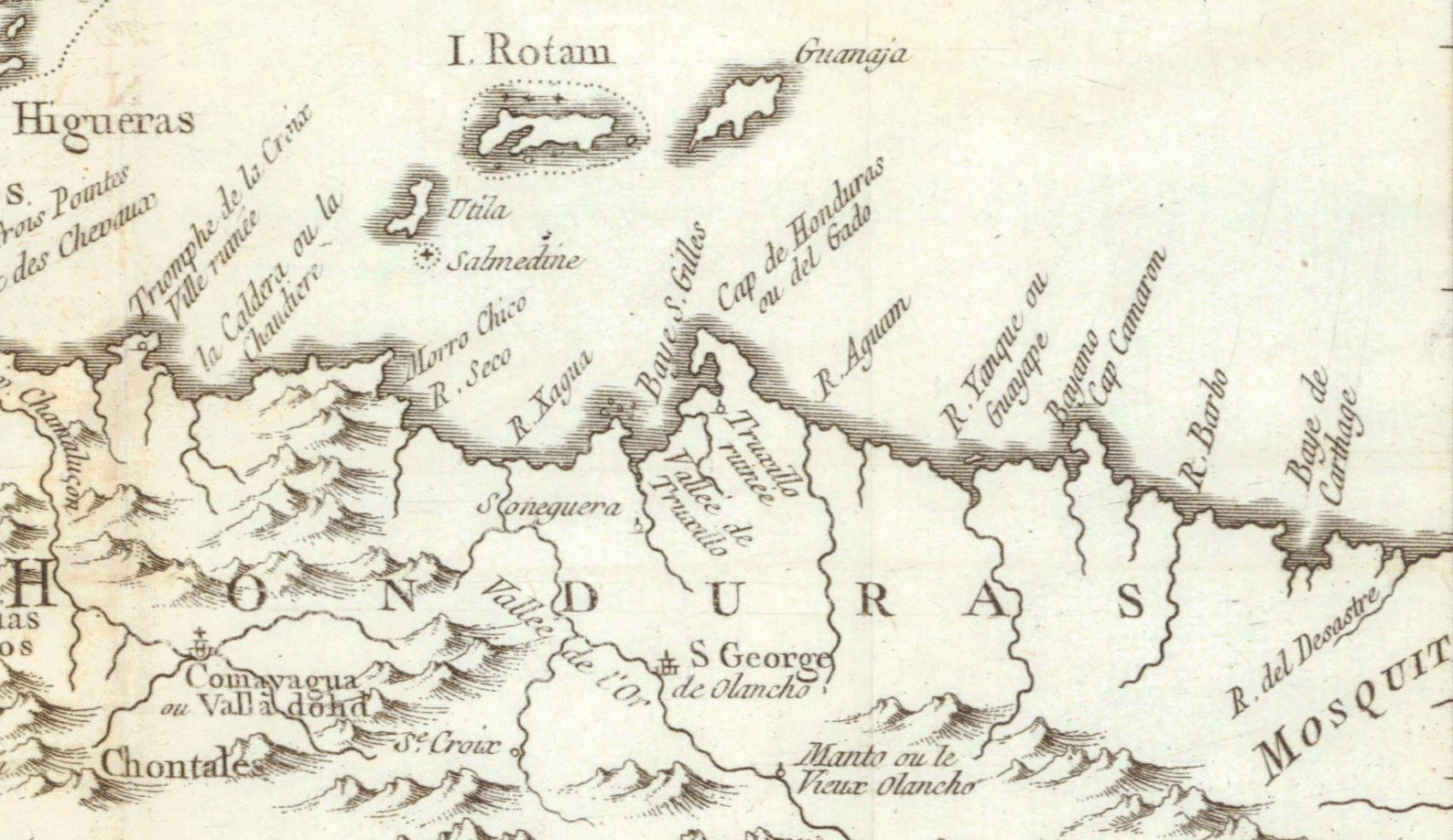
18th-century map of the Bay Islands

The events which followed, so far as they concern these islands, are thus narrated by the Bishop Pelaez: "On the 24th of September 1781, advices reached Truxillo, which were immediately communicated to the government at Comayagua, that certain Negroes and others, to the number of about 300 men, had constructed three forts at the entrance of the principal port of the island of Roatan, armed with 50 guns, and that three armed. Vessels cruised in the neighborhood, the object of the whole being to intercept the ships plying between the kingdom of Guatemala and Cuba. It was reported that these freebooters had 3000 barrels of provisions for their support, and that their object in holding the port was to make it a refuge for their vessels, which were no longer allowed to go-to Jamaica… When this information reached Guatemala, Viceroy Galvez, "made arrangements to expel the intruders."

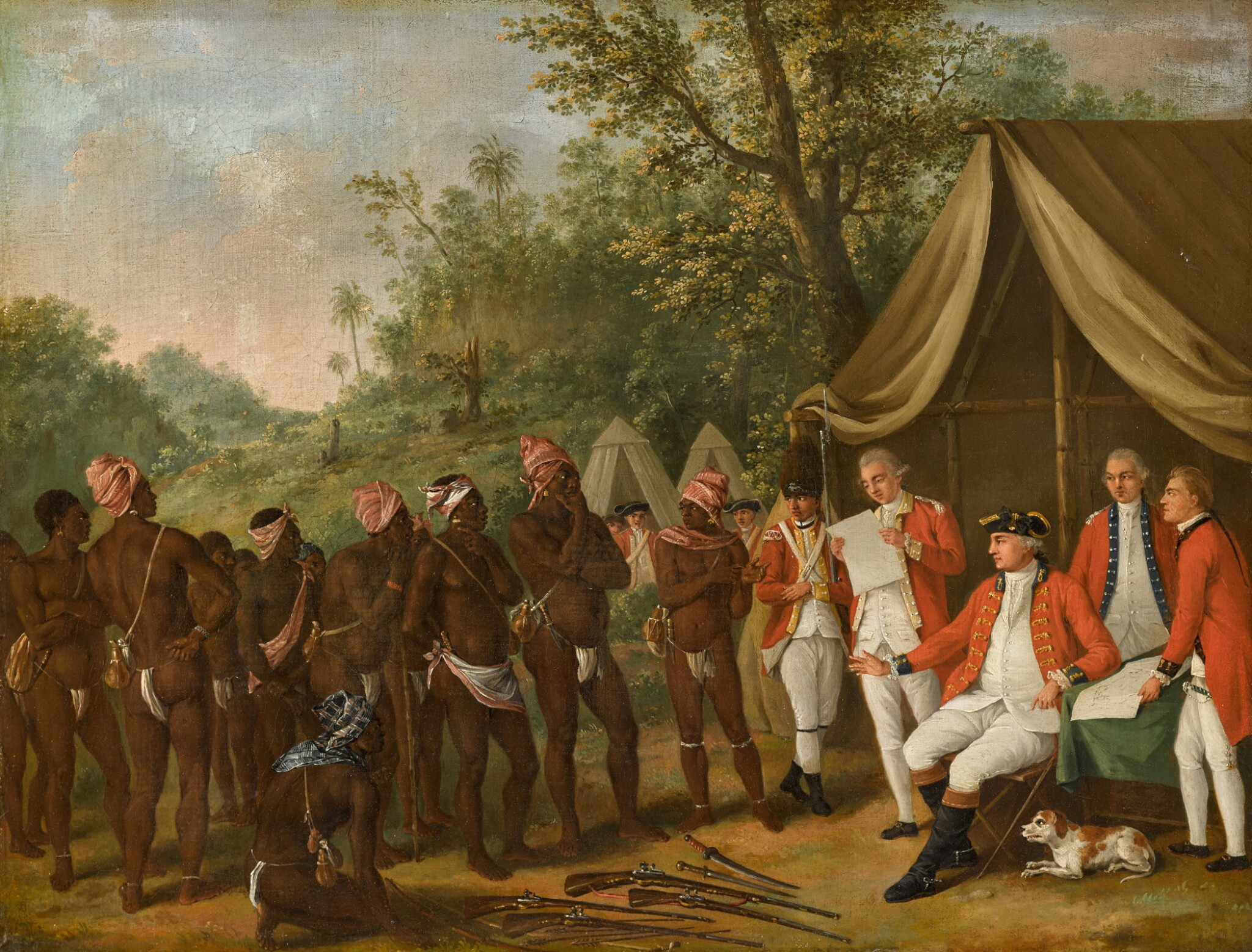
Black Caribs

=== Colony of the Bay Islands ===
Historic Bay Islands flag, still used as an unofficial symbol of the Islands. The flag was also used by the Governor of British Honduras.

The English seem to have made no other demonstration on the islands during the 18th century. They remained in the undisturbed occupation of Spain. "In 1821, when the Central American provinces achieved their independence, the islands were under the jurisdiction of the state of Honduras. This state of things continued until May, 1830, when the superintendent of the British establishment of Belize, as a measure of coercion against the republic, which had refused to surrender certain runaway slaves, made a descent on Roatan and seized it on behalf of the British crown. The federal authorities remonstrated, and the act was disavowed by the British government."

"The superintendents of Belize, however, seem to have kept a longing eye on the islands, and to have watched for a pretext to place them under their own jurisdiction. In 1838 their wishes were in part gratified. A party of liberated slaves...of the Grand Cayman islands, came to Roatan to settle. Col. Loustrelet, the commandant, apprised them that they could not do so without the permission of the state government of Honduras."

"A number applied for and obtained the requisite permission, and received grants of land. But another portion, incited by one or two white men among them, appealed, as British subjects, to the superintendent of Belize, Col. Macdonald, who immediately visited the island, in the British sloop-of war Bover, ran down the flag of Honduras, and, seizing Col. Loustrelet and his soldiers, landed them near Truxillo, and threatened them with death if they ventured to return."

The republic of Central America had meantime been dissolved, and the feeble state of Honduras was left alone to contest these violent proceedings. Her government remonstrated energetically, but without obtaining redress; and finally, in 1844, the British government instructed Mr. Chatfield, consul-general, to apprise the Honduras authorities, that "when Col. Macdonald hauled down the flag of that state in Roatan, it was by order of the British government... no act of sovereignty followed on the proceedings of Macdonald. Meanwhile, the Cayman islanders continued to emigrate to Roatan, and, in 1848, the population numbered upward of 1,000.

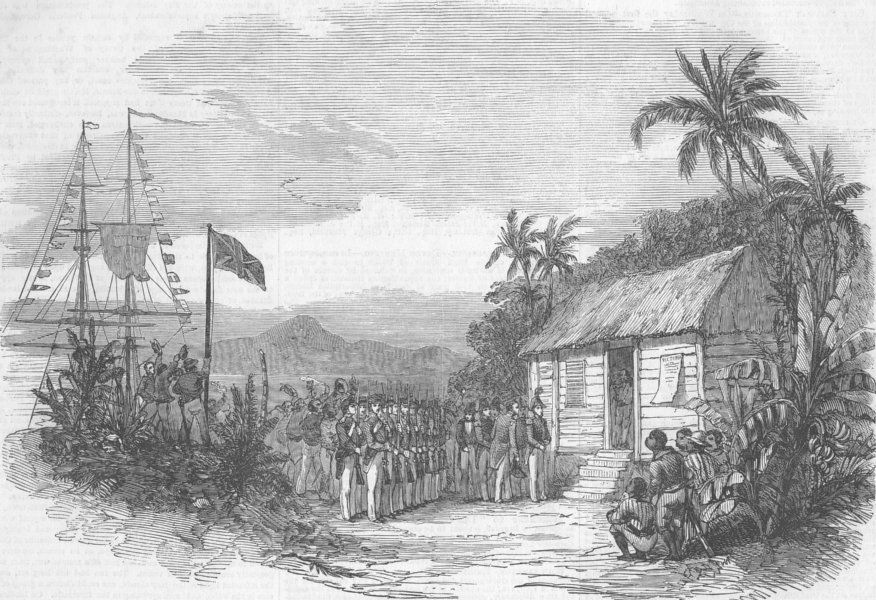
"Proclamation of the Colony of Bay Islands"

In 1850, the British organized the islands Roatan, Guanaja, Barbareta, Helena, Morat, and Utila into a colony under their rule, called the Bay Islands.

A small party in the island favourable to British interests, was active in their efforts to secure English protection. "When visited by Capt. Mitchell, E. N., in 1850, he describes them as "electing their own magistrates, by universal suffrage," and "quite ignorant under what government they are placed." A Mr. William Fitzgibbon was chief justice, and acting chief magistrate. Some time in this year, a petition was drawn up by the British party, addressed to the governor of Jamaica, asking him to name magistrates and assume supreme authority in the island.

Acting on this petition, Capt. Jolly in HMS Bermuda was sent to the islands. He called a meeting of the inhabitants, and declared them under the sovereignty of the United Kingdom. Chief Justice Fitzgibbon protested against the whole proceeding... In spite of this protest, however, and backed by the guns of Bermuda, the authorities appointed by Sir Charles Grey were duly installed in the islands. Two years after this occupation, on March 20, 1852, a royal warrant was issued, constituting the islands a colony, under the title of "colony of the Bay islands," of which proclamation was made in Roatan, by Col. Wodehouse, superintendent of Belize, Aug. 10, 1852.

=== Cession of the Colony to Honduras ===
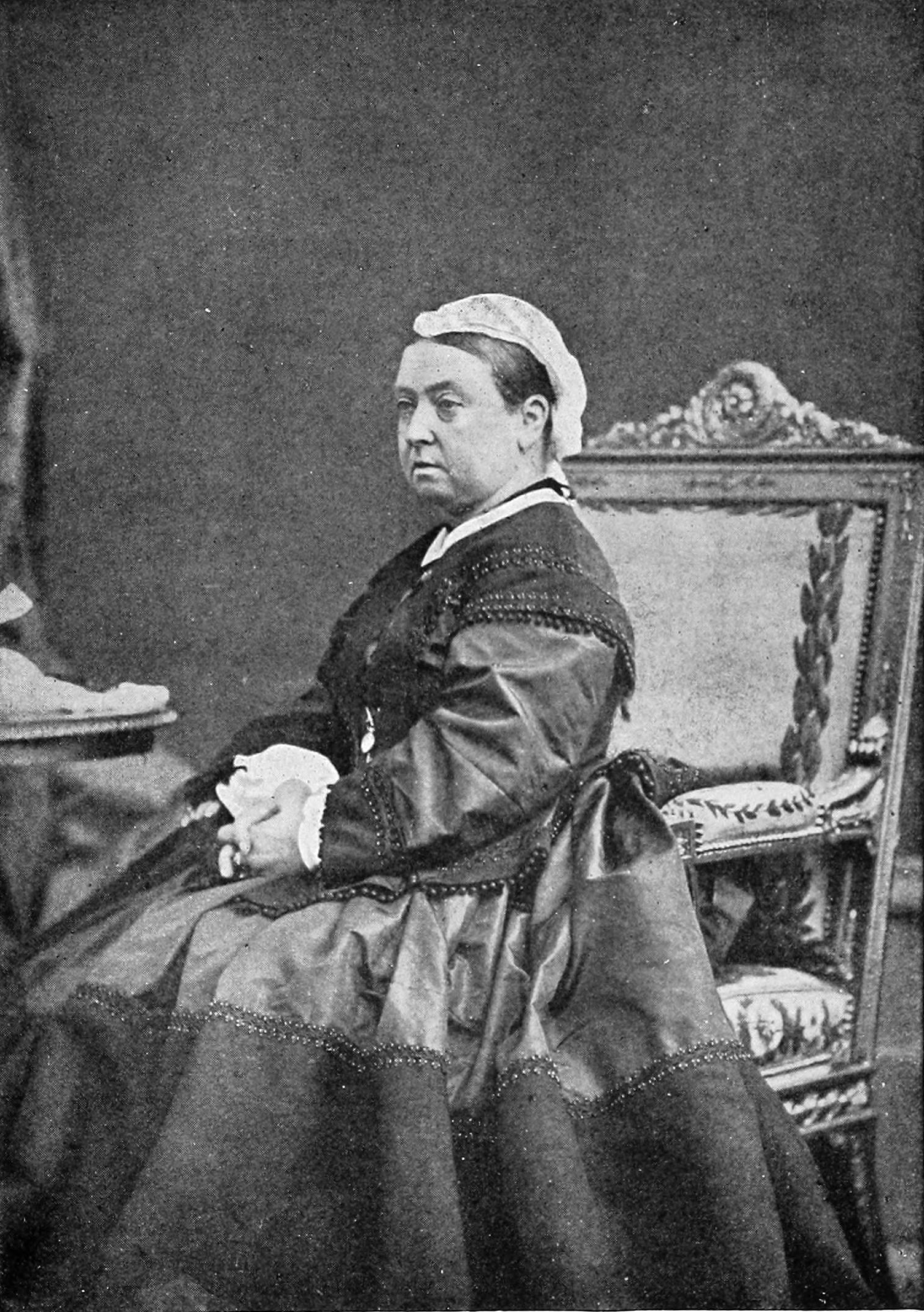
Queen Victoria of the United Kingdom grants the colony of the Bay Islands to Honduras after the Wyke-Cruz treaty.

The proclamation of these islands as a British colony, attracted immediate attention in the United States, where it was universally regarded as a direct violation of the convention of July 5, 1850, known as the Clayton–Bulwer Treaty. This convention provides that "the governments of the United States and Great Britain, neither the one nor the other, shall ever... occupy, or fortify, or colonize, or assume or exercise any dominion over Costa Rica, Nicaragua, the Mosquito shore, or any part of Central America."

The matter was brought under the attention of Congress, and the committee of foreign relations of the U.S. senate, after a full consideration, reported "that the islands of Roatán, Bonacca, Utila, etc, in and near the bay of Honduras, constitute part of the territory of the republic of Honduras, and therefore form a part of Central America; and, in consequence, that any occupation of these islands by Great Britain is a violation of the treaty of July 5, 1850."

Expostulations to this effect were at once addressed by the American government to that of the United Kingdom, and an elaborate correspondence was carried on through the years 1854–1856, between Mr. Buchanan, American minister in London, and Lord Clarendon, on the subject, but without any satisfactory result. The United Kingdom hastily augmented her naval forces on the West India station, and her example was promptly followed by the United States; and, for a time, the peace of the two countries hung upon the discretion of a few naval commanders, acting under orders necessarily vague and indefinite.

At this critical moment the government of Honduras despatched a minister to London, who took the ground that the question at issue was one that primarily concerned Honduras, and he demanded the surrender of the islands, equally as a measure of justice to that republic, and as a means of withdrawing a dangerous issue between the United States and the United Kingdom, upon which each had committed itself beyond the power of receding.

This solution was regarded with favor by both parties, and a convention was entered into between the United Kingdom and Honduras, whereby the Bay islands were placed under the sovereignty of the latter state, with the reservation of trial by jury, freedom of conscience, etc., to the actual inhabitants.

The principles of this convention were accepted by Honduras, but some of its details were viewed with disfavor by the Honduras congress, and it was returned to London for certain modifications. These changes were made, and the "colony of the Bay islands" ceased to exist, and the islands passed under the sovereignty of Honduras.

Many of the English settlers disagreed with this resolution. They sought the help of William Walker, an American journalist and mercenary filibuster, in order to put pressure on the British government to keep the islands. Walker, who had been deposed from the presidency of Nicaragua by a Central American army in 1857, decided to assist them. He arrived in Honduras, landing in Trujillo with 100 men, but his efforts to help the English settlers were in vain. Soon captured by Royal Navy Captain Nowell Salmon, he was delivered to the Honduran authorities, who court-martialled and executed him on September 12, 1860.

=== Citizenship ===
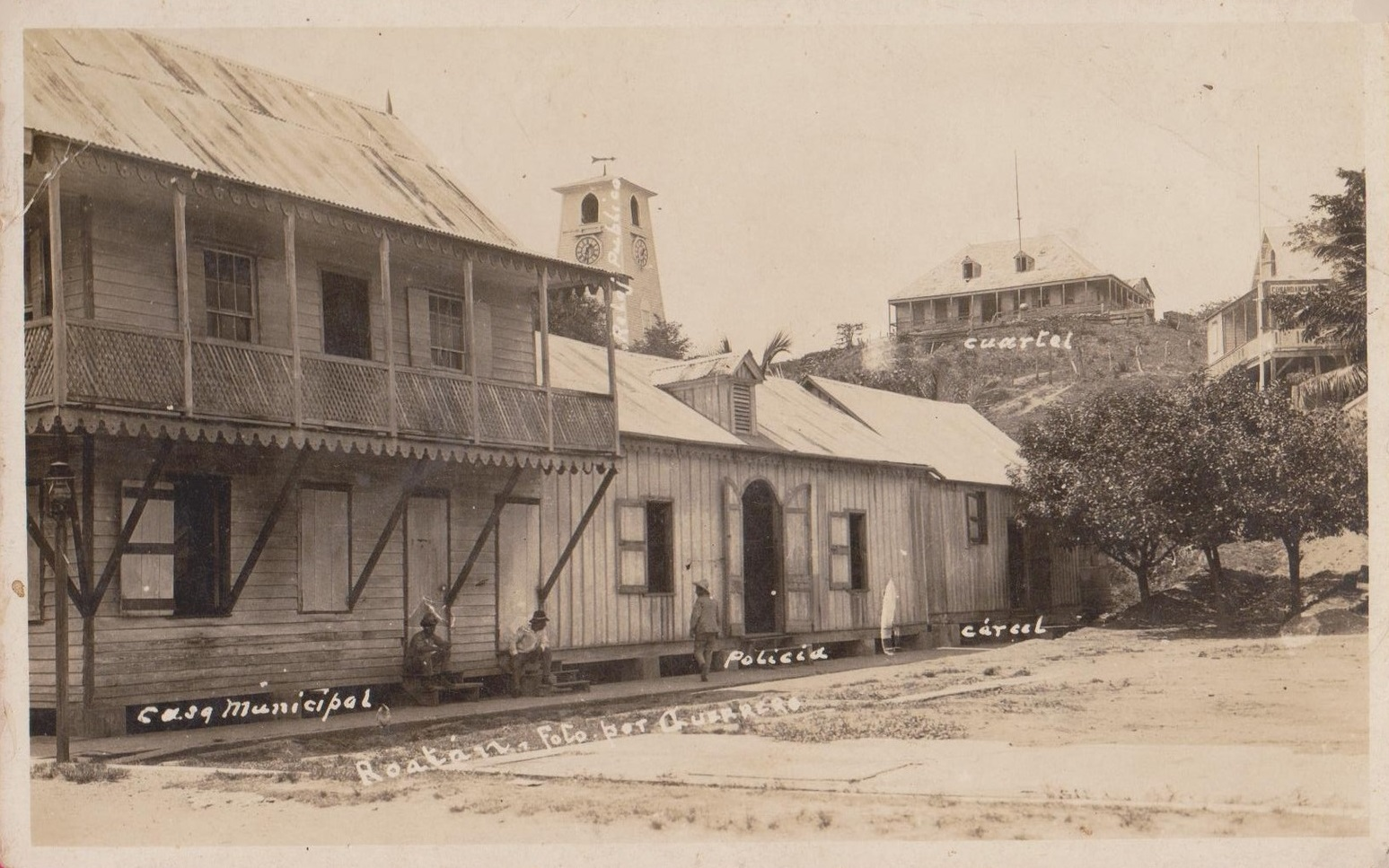
Coxen Hole in 1910. Most of the population in the town were English-speaking whites and garifuna people.

== Population ==
The population of the Bay Islands in 2010 was 49,158, according to the INE Population and Housing Census. It is the department with the smallest population in Honduras. 25,182 are women and 23,976 are men. The population density of the department is 208 inhabitants per km^{2}, with the highest concentrations in Roatán and Utila.

Roatán is the municipality with the most inhabitants, 29,636 in total. This municipality is followed by José Santos Guardiola, Guanaja, and Utila. The crude birth rate in the Bay Islands is 34.3. The mortality rate is 4.3, while the fertility rate is 3.7. The infant mortality rate is 24.7, while life expectancy in the islands is 72.6 years (2001 census). In 2001, the migratory balance was 13,109 immigrants vs. 3,789 emigrants, leaving a net migratory balance of 9,320.34 residents.

=== Ethnic composition ===
During the pre-Hispanic period, the Bay Islands were inhabited by the Pech people and other indigenous peoples. Archaeological remains found in the area, such as those on the island of Guanaja, show that these indigenous peoples originally inhabited all the island. However, they were eventually forced to relocate, or they were captured, enslaved, or killed after the foreign occupation of the Bay Islands. Due to this, the islands were practically uninhabited by the year 1528.

The archipelago began to be populated again by European people due to the arrival of English, French, and Dutch buccaneers who established their camps on the islands. From then on, the Bay Islands were the scene of frequent conflict between Spaniards and non-Spanish pirates.

=== White population ===
On the three main islands there live descendants of British settlers (mainly English) who occupied the islands in the 18th century. By the mid-19th century, under the Wyke-Cruz treaty, many of the descendants of the white colonists of Great Britain changed their citizenship to Honduran after the country regained the territory and officially separated from the British Empire. However, it would take several decades for them to assimilate into the Honduran population.

A 2013 census determined that 11.41% of the population of the Bay Islands is white. However, it has been confirmed that more than 40% of the population on the island of Roatán is of foreign origin. These are mostly white Americans and French Canadians, as well as some European immigrants who have decided to buy properties on the islands.

=== Black population ===
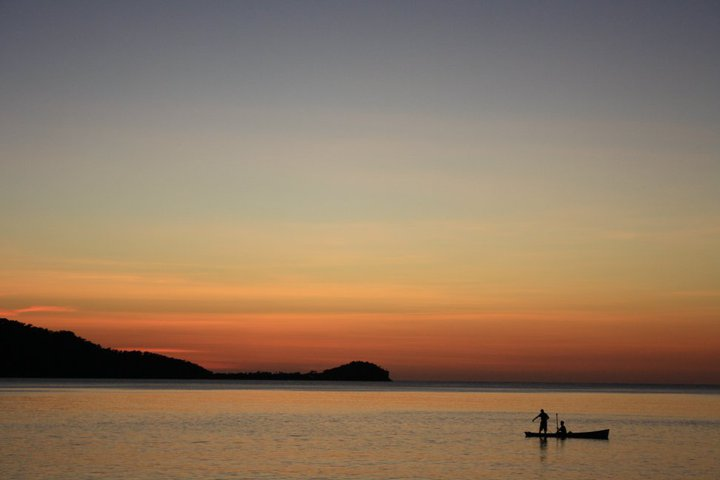
Garifuna fishermen. Fishing is a common job in black communities.

During the 18th century and the beginning of the 19th century, under British occupation, several contingents of black people arrived on these islands, among which three major groups stand out:

(1) The Afro-colonial or French blacks, brought by the Spanish colonizers.

(2) The Black Caribs or Garífunas.

(3) The Anglo-Antilleans, known as English-speaking blacks, brought from Jamaica and the Cayman Islands to work in agriculture.

At present, the black inhabitants of the Bay Islands are not a genetically homogeneous group. Some black caribs with European ancestry and lighter skin refer to themselves as "browns" while referring to those with less European ancestry and darker skin as "colored".

== Economy ==
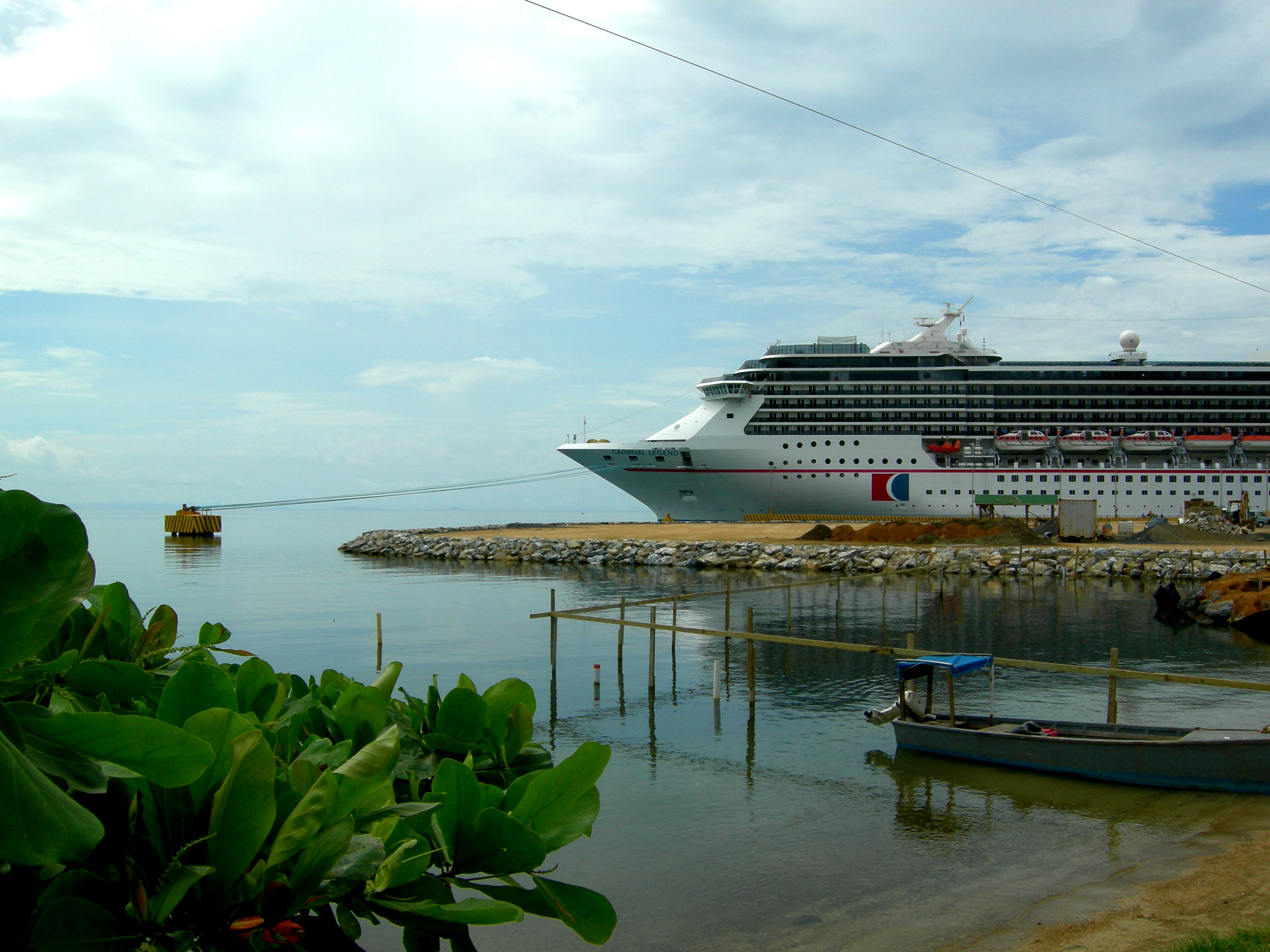
Carnival Legend in Roatan

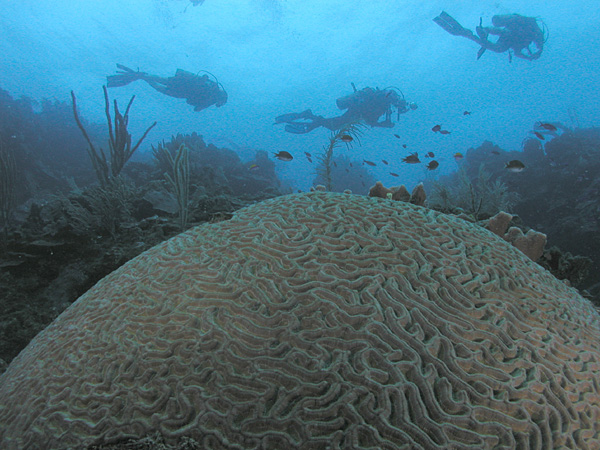
Divers and a large brain coral, Roatan

The economy of the Bay Islands depends directly on two sectors – tourism and fisheries, representing approximately 50% of gross island product and both closely linked to the archipelago’s environment. All other activities provide services to these sectors, either directly as in the case of transportation or indirectly such as real estate and construction. The dynamic character of these sectors has led to accelerated growth over the last two decades, a phenomenon that has induced population growth rates approaching 8% annually, largely as a result of migration from various parts of Honduras and elsewhere.

The Bay Islands serve "as the major anchor site for Honduras's growing tourism industry, accounting for approximately 28% of all tourism arrivals." In 1990, an estimated 15,000 tourists came to the islands; by 1996 it was 60,000. According to the Honduran Institute of Tourism, during the year 2010 the islands of Roatán received 803,102 cruise shippers, 373,273 more than those received in 2009 (an increase of 86.8%). Total tourism receipts are estimated in the neighborhood of US$55 million annually.

Islander men frequently join on with the merchant marine or work on international cruise ships for several months of the year. This low-key existence began to change starting in the late 1960s, when tourists discovered the islands’ reefs, beaches, and funky culture. Since the late 1980s, the pace has picked up dramatically.

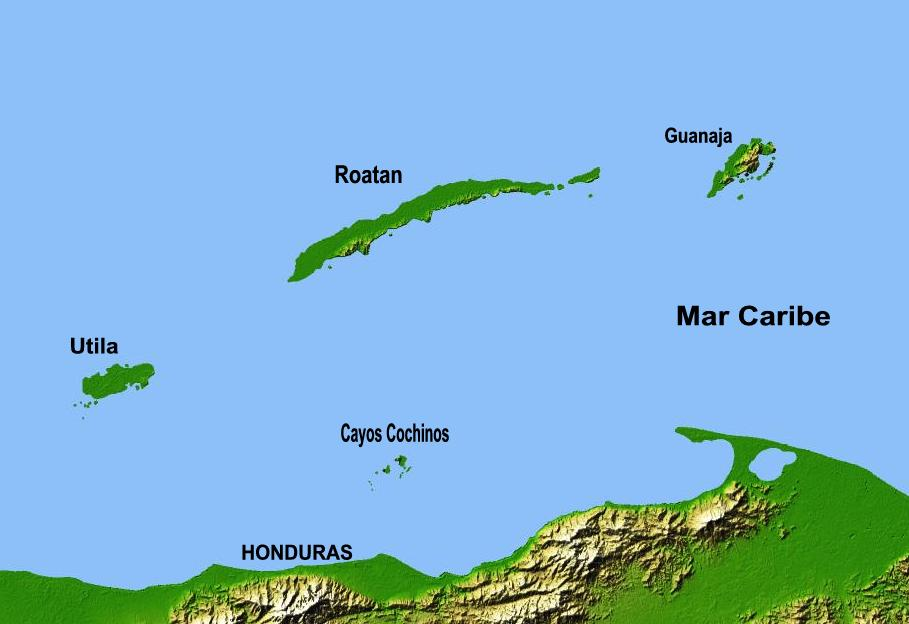
Bay Islands Map

The department is divided into four municipalities

== Municipalities ==
(municipalidades):

Municipality	Description	Capital	Area (km^{2})	Area (mi^{2})	Population census 2012
1 Guanaja	Guanaja Island	Bonacca Town	55.4	21.4	8,300
Guanaja Island		Savannah Bight	54	21	4,300
Guanaja Cays		Bonacca Town	1.4	0.54	4,000
2 José Santos Guardiola	Eastern Roatán Island, JonesVille	Oak Ridge	57.3	22.1	17,950
Eastern Roatán Island		Oak Ridge	50	19	17,940
Barbareta Island		Playa Barbareta	6	2.3	10
Helene Island, Morat, Pigeon Cays			1.3	0.50	900
3 Roatán	Western Roatán Island	Coxen Hole	87.3	33.7	41,220
Western Roatán Island		Coxen Hole	80	31	41,060
Roatan Cays		Antoney's Cay	1.2	0.46	40
Swan Islands		Harbor Bay	3	1.25	10
Cayos Cochinos		Chachauate	2.9	1.1	110
4 Utila	Utila Island	Utila Town	49.3	19.0	4,030
Utila Island	Utila Island	Utila Town	47.9	18.5	3,580
Utila Island	Utila Cays	Jewel Cay; Pigeon Cay	1	0.39	450
Bay Islands		Coxen Hole	228	88	71,500

== See also ==
- List of islands in the Caribbean: Honduras
- Municipalities of Honduras
- Outline of Honduras
