= Wollochet Bay =

Coordinates: 47°17′54″N 122°36′53″W

Wollochet Bay is the name of a narrow long and shallow bay in southern Puget Sound in the state of Washington. The bay is located on the southern part of the Kitsap Peninsula, and opens onto the southern Hale Passage separating Fox Island from the Kitsap Peninsula, near Gig Harbor.
