= List of airlines of Peru =

== Active ==
This is a list airlines which have an air operator's certificate issued by the Civil Aviation Authority of Peru for regularly-scheduled service as of 2026.

Airline	Image	IATA	ICAO	Callsign	Hub(s)	Founded	Permit type	Notes
AerCaribe Perú		EF	CPR	CARIBE-PERÚ	Jorge Chávez International Airport	2011		
Atsa Airlines		R8	AMP	ATSA	Jorge Chávez International Airport	1980		
JetSmart Perú		JZ	JAP	RED SMART	Jorge Chávez International Airport; Rodríguez Ballón International Airport	2021	Domestic and International	
LATAM Airlines Perú		LP	LPE	LAN PERÚ	Jorge Chávez International Airport	2016	Domestic and International	
Servicios Aéreos de los Andes		FP	AND	SERVI ANDES	Jorge Chávez International Airport	2005		
Sky Airline Peru		H2	SKX	AEROSKY	Jorge Chávez International Airport	2019		
Skybus Jet Cargo		HV	HVY	LIFT PERÚ	Jorge Chávez International Airport	2013		
Star Perú		2I	SRU	STAR-UP	Jorge Chávez International Airport	1997		Formerly Star Up.

== Defunct ==
Airline	Image	IATA	ICAO	Callsign	Founded	Ceased operations	Notes
Aero Cóndor		Q6	CDP	CONDOR-PERÚ	1975	2008	
Aero Continente		N6	ACQ	AERO CONTINENTE	1992	2004	Renamed to Nuevo Continente
Aero Norte					1979	1988	Video about the DC-3 airframe of Aero Norte: https://www.youtube.com/watch?v=65uMPlM8las
Aero Santa		UJ	ASP		1993	1998	Subsidiary of Faucett Perú
Aero Tumi					1992	1994	
Aerochasqui		3Q	XYC		1990	1991	
Aerolíneas Peruanas		EP	PRU	APSA	1956	1971	
Aeronaves del Perú		XX	WPL	PERÚ	1965	1996	
Aerotransporte Peruanos Internacionales			APS		1988	1991	
Aeroperú		PL	PLI	AEROPERÚ	1973	1999	Went bankrupt
Aeroperú					2019	2020	Founded by Peruvian Airlines, did not start operations following the bankruptcy of Peruvian airlines
Aerocargo Peruana					1982	1988	
Air Perú					2006	2009	Failed project
Americana de Aviación		8A	ANE	AMERICANA	1990	1997	
Andrea Air					1991	1991	
APISA Air Cargo			PIC	APISA	1985	1992	
Aviandina		SJ	VND	AVIANDINA	1999	2003	
Avianca Perú		T0	TPU	AVIANCA PERÚ	2013	2020	Liquidated due to the COVID-19 outbreak
AviaSelva					2007	2008	
Cielos Airlines		A2	CIU	CIELOS	1997	2012	
Colibri Airlines					1994	2001	
Compañia Peruana Internacional de Aviación				COPISA	1964	1970	
Export Air Cargo		EL	EXD	EXPORT	1992	1998	
Expreso Aéreo		9D;N8	EPR		1992	1994	
Faucett Perú		CF	CFP	CHARLIE FOXTROT	1928	1999	Went bankrupt
Imperial Air		7I	IMP		1992	1997	
LAN Perú		LP	LPE	LAN PERÚ	1999	2016	Renamed to LATAM Airlines Perú
LANSA					1963	1972	
LC Perú		W4	LCB	BUSRE	1993	2018	Went bankrupt
Magenta Air		I2			2002	2005	
Nuevo Continente		N6	ACQ	AERO CONTINENTE	2004	2005	License revoked
Peruvian Airlines		P9	PVN	PERUVIAN	2007	2019	
Peruvian International Airways					1946	1949	
SATCO				SATCO	1960	1973	Rebranded as Aeroperú
Servicio Aéreo Ejecutivo			SEJ	EJECUTIVO PERÚ	1990	1995	
Sitra Cargo System			SCG	SITRA	1991	1994	
TACA Perú		TO	TPU	TACA PERÚ	1999	2013	Renamed to Avianca Perú
TANS Perú		TJ	ELV	AEREOS SELVA	1963	2006	AOC suspended.
Transportes Generales Aéreos					2011	2015	Never launched
Viva Air Perú		VV	VPE	VIVA PERÚ	2016	2023	
Zi Cargo					1988	1991	

== See also ==
- List of airlines of the Americas
- List of airports in Peru
