= Aero Continente =

Passenger airline based in Lima, Peru

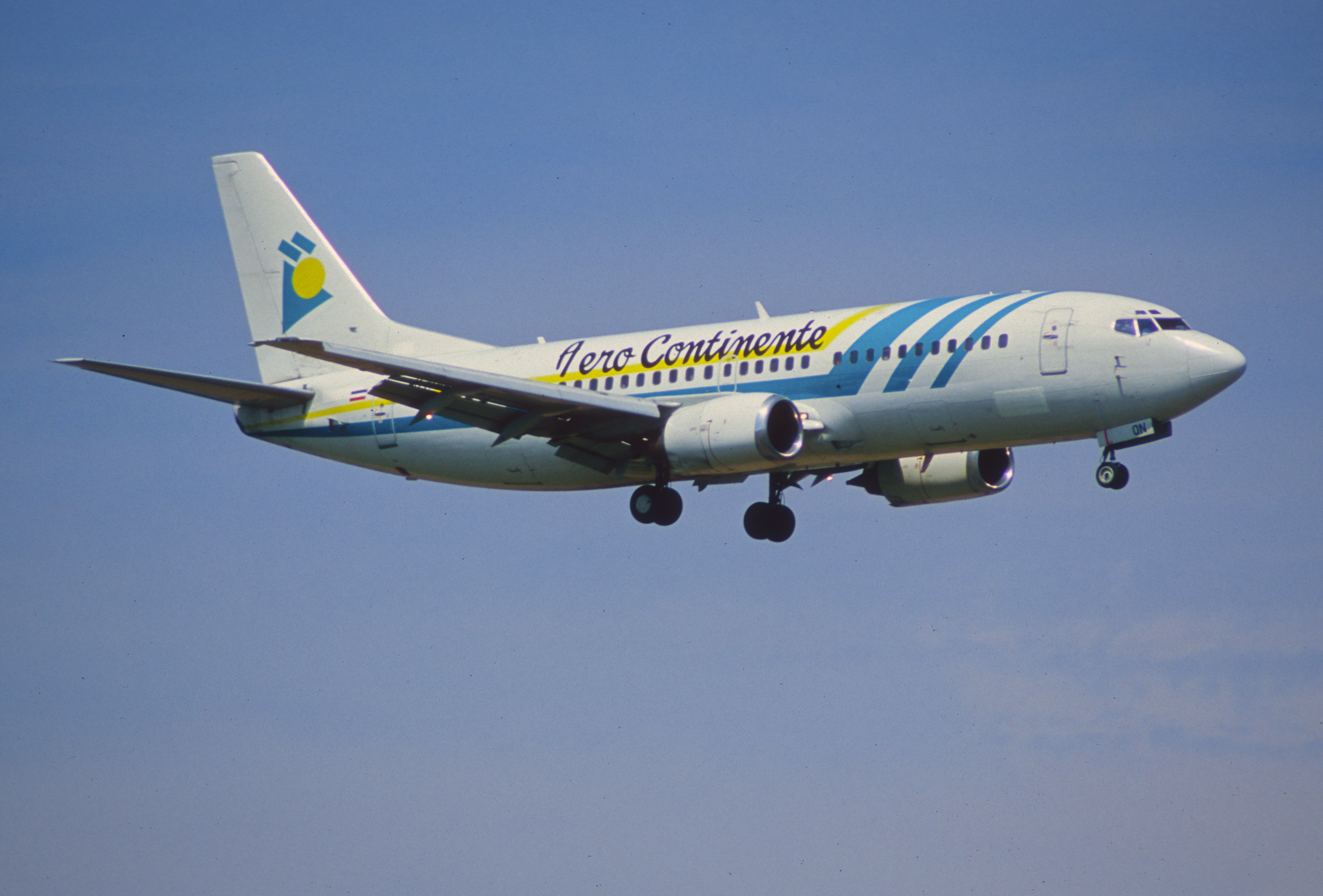
| IATA | ICAO | Call sign |
|---|---|---|
| N6 | ACQ | AERO CONTINENTE |
- Founded: January 4, 1992
- Commenced operations: May 25, 1992
- Ceased operations: July 12, 2004 (as Aero Continente); October 29, 2004 (as Nuevo Continente)
- Hubs: Jorge Chávez International Airport
- Subsidiaries: Aero Continente Chile; Aero Continente Dominicana; Aviandina; Cardinal Líneas Aéreas
- Headquarters: Lima, Peru
- Key people: Miguel Halabi (President)
- Founder: Fernando Zevallos
- Employees: 1,500 (as of July 2004)
- Website: aerocontinente.com

Aero Continente was an airline based in Lima, Peru, operating scheduled domestic and international flights out of Jorge Chavez International Airport.

== History ==
=== Early operations and rapid expansion ===
The airline was founded by Fernando Zevallos in January 1992 as Aero Continente. Flight operations were launched on May 25 of that year, initially on regional chartered routes on behalf of Occidental Petroleum, a US-based oil and gas company. Scheduled domestic passenger services commenced on July 20, 1993, using a fleet of just two aircraft: a Boeing 727-100 and a Boeing 737-200. At that time, the Peruvian airline market was dominated by Faucett Perú and Aeroperú. Aero Continente competed with these airlines by offering extremely low ticket fares.

During the 1990s, the safety reputation of the Peruvian airline industry became a public concern after a series of high-profile accidents, especially Faucett's crash in Arequipa and Aeroperú Flight 603, both in 1996. In August of that year, the US Embassy in Lima issued a ban on their employees from flying on Aero Continente due to reported issues with its aircraft engines, and advised caution to US citizens flying on Peruvian airlines, to the point of providing a hotline and a web portal to help tourists know if a certain airline was considered unsafe.

When Faucett and Aéroperu both went bankrupt in 1999 due to financial difficulties, Aero Continente acquired a monopoly position as the only airline operating on domestic routes in the country. By that time, the fleet size had been increased to approximately 30 aircraft, mainly of the 737 type, though larger aircraft like the Lockheed L-1011 TriStar were also used. During that period, international routes were launched, the first ones connecting Lima with Panama City and Santiago de Chile. This coincided with the foundation of Aero Continente Chile, a wholly owned subsidiary aiming at the Chile domestic market using a fleet of Boeing 737-200 aircraft handed down from its parent.

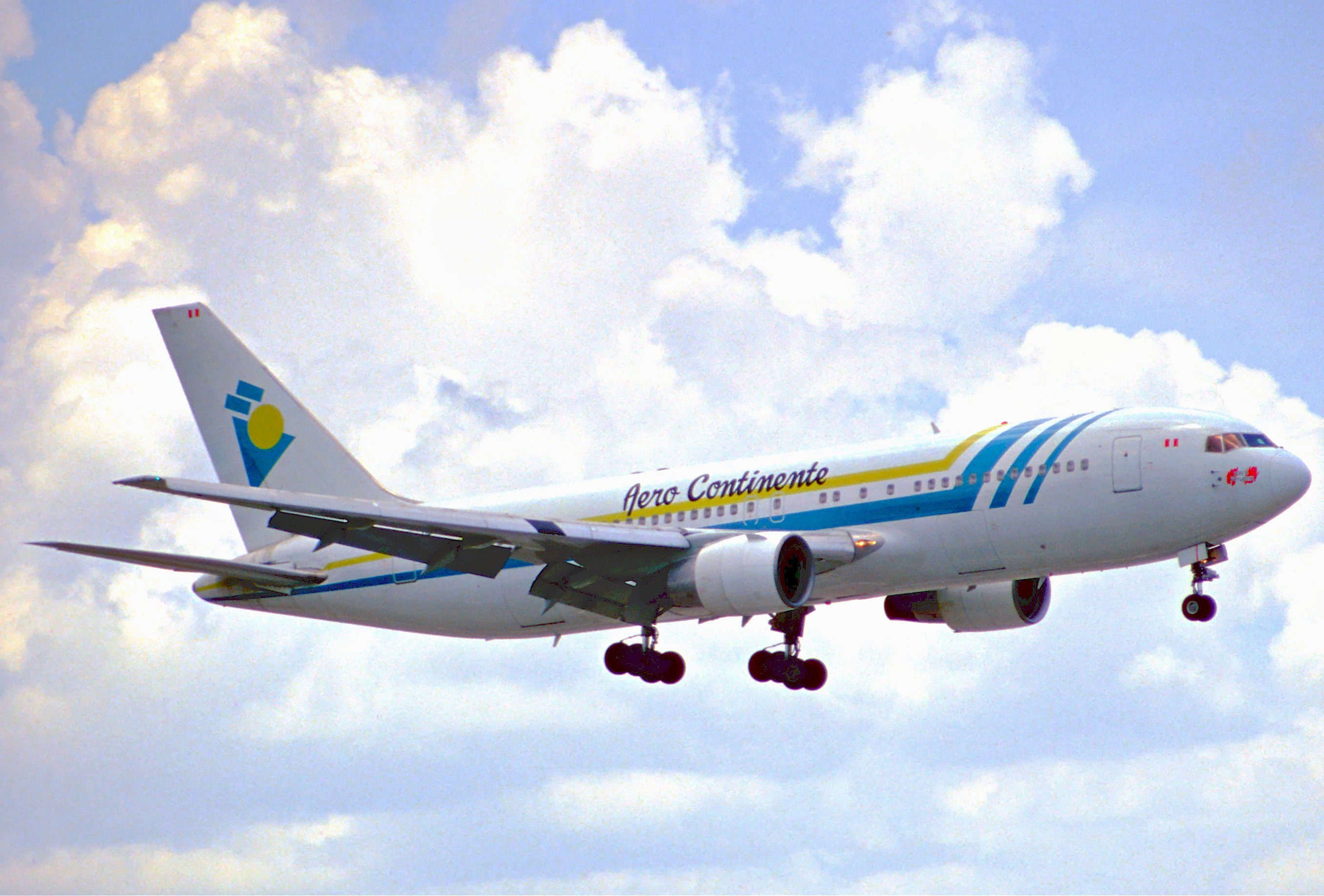
A Boeing 767-200ER on approach to Miami International Airport in July 2003

In late 1999, Aero Continente was granted approval to operate on the prestigious route from Lima to Miami. For this purpose, a Boeing 757-200 had been leased from Air 2000. After half a year, the leasing contract was terminated. The Miami route was henceforth offered by Aero Continente Chile from Santiago with a stopover in Lima with a Boeing 767-200ER. By 2001, the combined international network of the Lima- and Santiago-based companies had grown to include Buenos Aires, Bogotá, La Paz, Caracas, Guayaquil and Santa Cruz de la Sierra.

Aero Continente Dominicana, a second wholly owned subsidiary based in Santo Domingo, had been founded in late 2001. This short-lived business adventure lasted only roughly one year, operating a limited number of flights from the Dominican Republic to Miami. In 2003, after the Dominican subsidiary had failed, Aero Continente itself opened a small base at Santo Domingo Airport, offering VFR flights to the Hispanic population centers in New York City, Los Angeles and Madrid.

=== Controversy and collapse ===
In 2002, the company suffered a setback when Chilean authorities arrested several staff members of Aero Continente Chile over drug trafficking allegations, which forced the airline to cease all flight operations. As a consequence, the Chilean subsidiary was re-integrated into mainline Aero Continente, which claimed the grounding had been rather motivated by concerns that the company had become too strong a competitor for LAN Chile, the Chilean flag carrier.

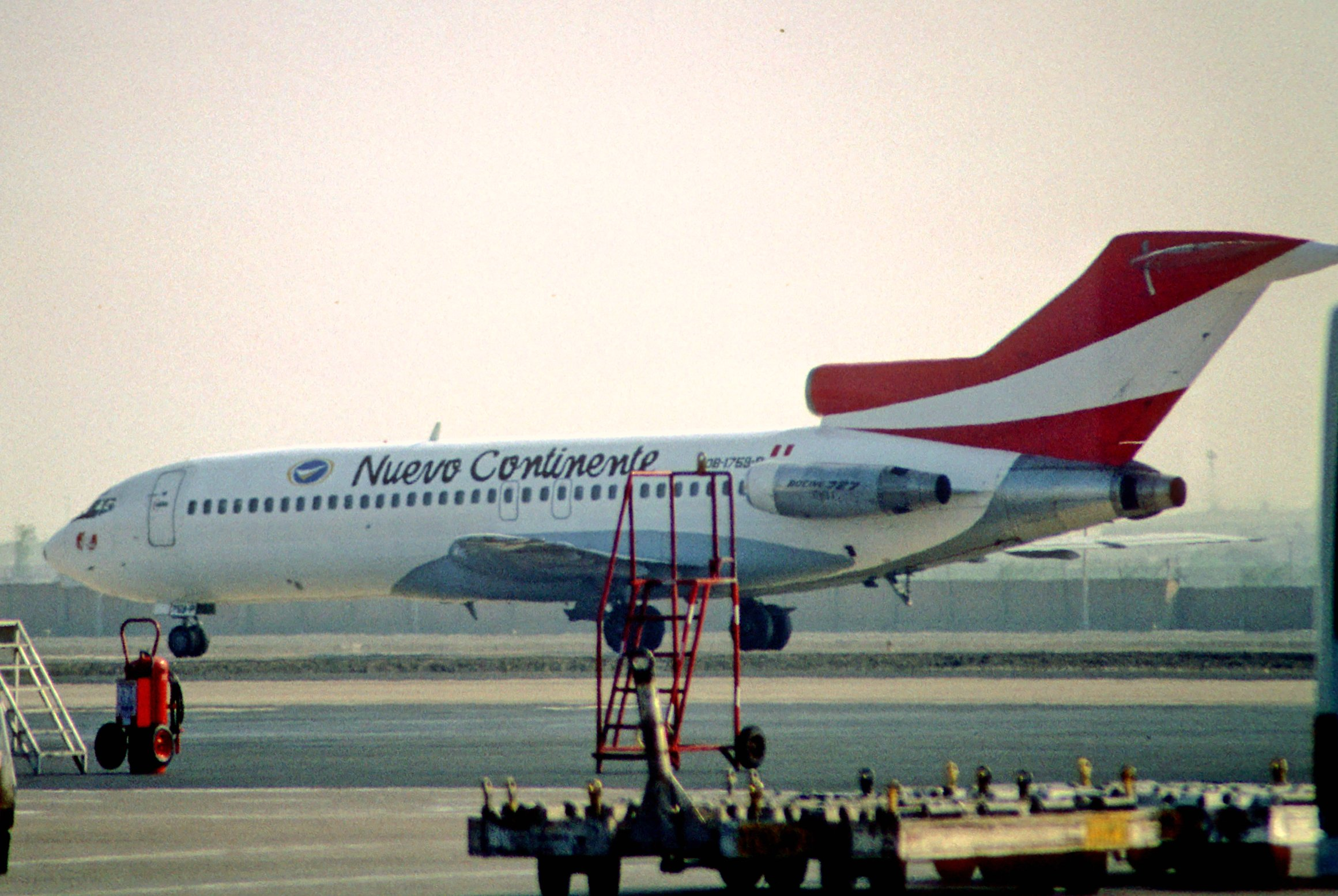
A Boeing 727-100 at Jorge Chávez International Airport with the revived Nuevo Continente livery in October 2004

On June 1, 2004, Aero Continente had its approval to operate into the United States withdrawn by the Office of Foreign Assets Control of the United States Treasury, as its founder and key person, Fernando Zervallos, had been included in a list of the ten most wanted crime bosses of the illegal drug trade (Specially Designated Nationals). Thus, Aero Continente lost its insurance protection, as Global Aerospace, a partly US-based company that was responsible for this matter, was forced to cease its involvement with the airline. It was also unable to buy spare parts for its mostly US-built fleet. Consequently, all flight operations ceased on July 12, 2004.

In a comeback effort, the company changed its structure to employee ownership and adopted the new name Nuevo Continente. Although the company restart operations on July 23, 2004, focusing only on domestic flights, it could not dispel allegations that it was involved in criminal activities. Nuevo Continente suspended its operations on October 29 of the same year, after its operating license was revoked by the Peruvian authorities, officially due to safety concerns.

== Destinations ==
=== Domestic ===
- Lima (Hub)
- Cusco
- Arequipa
- Juanjuí
- Juliaca
- Trujillo
- Chiclayo
- Piura
- Cajamarca
- Chachapoyas
- Pucallpa
- Moyobamba
- Tarapoto
- Tacna
- Andoas
- Iquitos
- Yurimaguas
- Ayacucho

=== International ===
- Panama City-Tocumen
- Santiago de Chile
- Arica
- Iquique
- Antofagasta
- Puerto Montt
- Balmaceda
- Punta Arenas
- Miami
- La Paz
- Santa Cruz de la Sierra-Viru Viru
- Port-au-Prince
- Buenos Aires-Ezeiza
- Córdoba
- Guayaquil
- Quito
- Caracas
- Bogotá
- Frankfurt
- Madrid
- Santo Domingo-Las Américas
- Berlin-Schönefeld

== Fleet ==
Over the years, Aero Continente (and later Nuevo Continente) operated the following aircraft types:

| Aircraft | Introduced | Retired |
|---|---|---|
| Boeing 727-100 | 1992 | 2004 |
| Boeing 737-100 | 1996 | 2003 |
| Boeing 737-200 | 1992 | 2004 |
| Boeing 757-200 | 1999; 2003 | 2000; 2004 |
| Boeing 767-200 | 2000 | 2004 |
| Fokker F27 Friendship | 1994 | |
| Fokker F28 Fellowship | 1995 | 2004 |
| Lockheed L-1011 TriStar | 1996 | 1997 |

== Accidents and incidents ==
- In 1996, the airline became the center of a scandal after it became known that two teenagers rode in the cockpit of a flight from Lima to Tarapoto, after being instructed to do so by the flight attendants due to overbooking. This act was a flagrant violation of international air safety standards.
- On December 13, 2003 at 22:48 local time, the Boeing 737-200 (registered OB-1544-P) operating Aero Continente Flight 341 from Caracas to Lima belly-landed at Jorge Chavez International Airport because the pilots had forgotten about lowering the landing gear since they had to cope with a problem concerning the flaps. The aircraft was damaged beyond repair, but all 94 passengers and six crew on board survived the accident.

== See also ==
- List of airlines of Peru
