= Viva Air Perú =

Peruvian low-cost airline

IATA	ICAO	Call sign
VV	VPE	VIVA PERÚ
- Founded: November 2016
- Commenced operations: May 9, 2017
- Ceased operations: February 27, 2023
- Hubs: Jorge Chávez International Airport
- Destinations: 4
- Parent company: Viva Air Colombia
- Headquarters: Callao, Peru
- Founder: William N.A. Shaw
- Website: www.vivaair.com/pe

Viva Air Perú S.A.C. was a Peruvian ultra low-cost carrier. It was created by Irelandia Aviation, which also developed similar carriers Viva Air Colombia and Mexico's VivaAerobús, the latter of which has no legal affiliation with the other "Viva" brands.

== History ==
In November 2016, William Shaw and José Castellanos announced the entry of a new low-cost airline in Perú, to operate in the first quarter of 2017 by the Peruvian company Viva Air Perú through the integration of the Viva group and Irelandia Aviation. Both detailed that this new company would have two Airbus A320-200s from Viva Air Colombia, at a cost of 60 soles per segment and with eight national destinations, estimating that a number of 700 thousand passengers would be transported in its first year of operation.

On January 19, 2017, the company obtained from the Ministry of Transport and Communications the operating permit for regular national air transport of passengers, cargo and mail for a period of four years. Also the company made clarifications that they would wait for the delivery of the air operator certificate that is estimated to arrive before April 11. Likewise, José Castellanos also explained that the prices would be made by sections.

On February 27, 2023, Viva Air Perú and its parent company suspended their operations indefinitely and grounded their entire fleet due to the financial crisis, blaming the situation on the delay on the response from Aerocivil on the Avianca-Viva merger authorization, stating that "The (civil aviation authority's) unprecedented decision will result in further delays in reaching a decision, for which Viva is forced to announce, unfortunately, the suspension of its operations with immediate effect".

== Destinations ==
As of December 2022, Viva Air Perú flew to destinations across Peru and Colombia.

Country	City	Airport	Notes	Refs
Colombia	Bogotá	El Dorado International Airport		
Colombia	Medellín	José María Córdova International Airport		
Peru	Arequipa	Rodríguez Ballón International Airport	Terminated	
Peru	Cajamarca	Mayor General FAP Armando Revoredo Iglesias Airport	Terminated	
Peru	Chiclayo	FAP Captain José Abelardo Quiñones González International Airport	Terminated	
Peru	Cusco	Alejandro Velasco Astete International Airport		
Peru	Iquitos	Crnl. FAP Francisco Secada Vignetta International Airport	Terminated	
Peru	Jaén	Jaén Airport	Terminated	
Peru	Juliaca	Inca Manco Cápac International Airport	Terminated	
Peru	Lima	Jorge Chávez International Airport	Hub	
Peru	Piura	Cap. FAP Guillermo Concha Iberico International Airport	Terminated	
Peru	Talara	Capitán FAP Víctor Montes Arias International Airport	Terminated	
Peru	Tacna	Coronel FAP Carlos Ciriani Santa Rosa International Airport	Terminated	
Peru	Tarapoto	Cadete FAP Guillermo del Castillo Paredes Airport	Terminated	

== Fleet ==
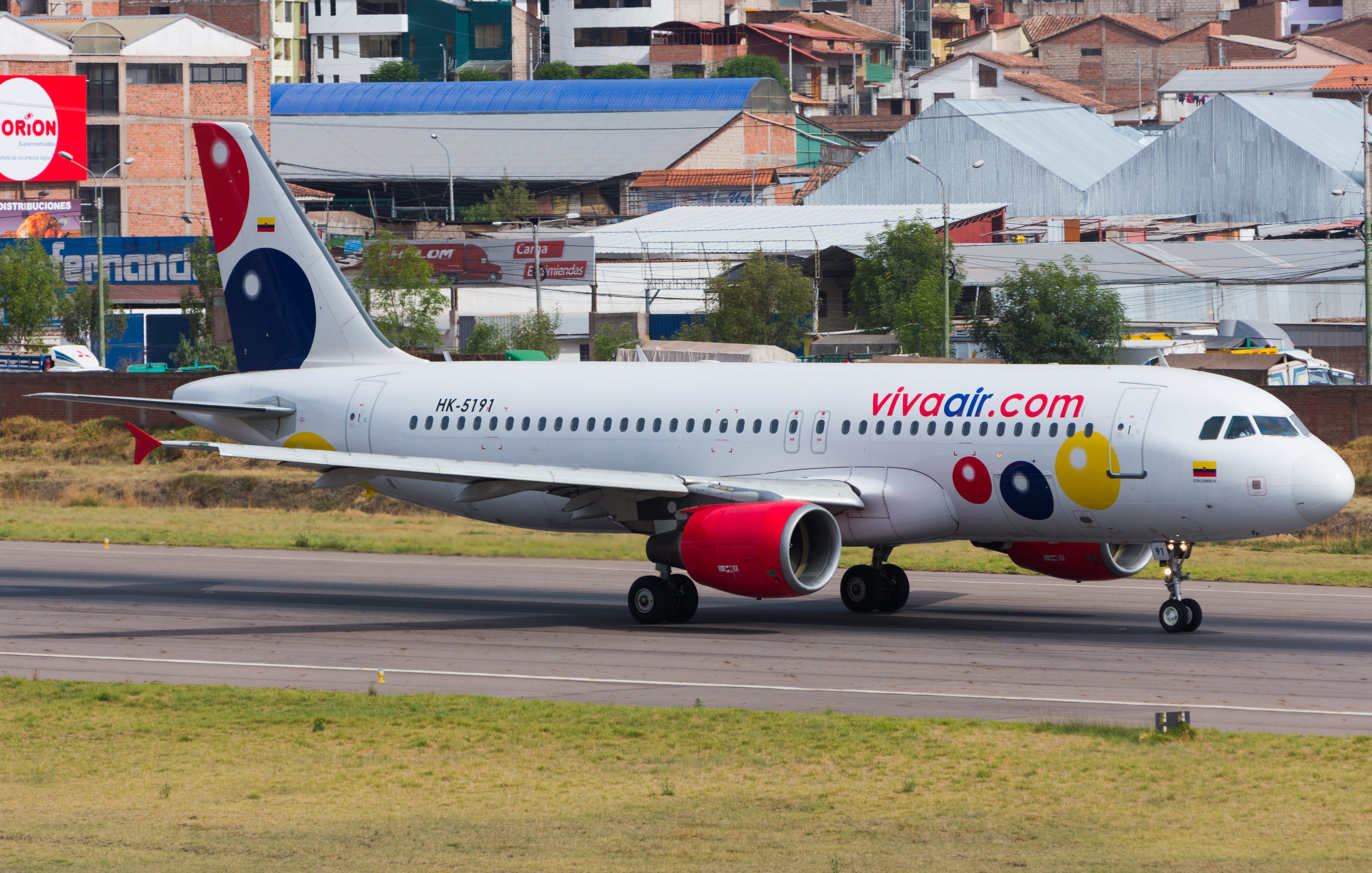
A former Viva Air Perú Airbus A320-200 at Alejandro Velasco Astete International Airport in 2017

Viva Air Perú operated the following aircraft:

Viva Air Perú former fleet
Aircraft	Total	Introduced	Retired	Notes
Airbus A320-200	4	2017	2023	Operated by Viva Air Colombia

== See also ==
- List of low-cost airlines
- List of airlines of Peru
