= Air Perú =

Air Perú International S.A.C.
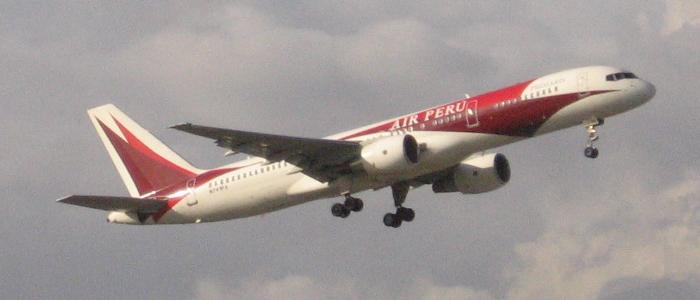
- An Air Perú Boeing 757-200 departing from Fort Lauderdale–Hollywood International Airport in 2008
- Founded: October 6, 2006
- Ceased operations: 2009
- Hubs: Jorge Chávez International Airport
- Alliance: Primaris Airlines
- Fleet size: 1
- Headquarters: Lima, Peru
- Key people: CEO: Guillermo de la Torre Bueno
- Website: www.flyairperu.com

Air Perú International S.A.C. was a proposed Peruvian airline to be based in Lima, Peru. It planned to operate scheduled domestic and international services to Asia, Europe, South America and the United States. Its main base would have been Jorge Chávez International Airport.

By September 2009, there had been no news on the airline and all plans seem to have ceased. The airline's trademark registration expired in 2017.

== Destinations ==
Air Perú planned to serve the following destinations:

- Peru
  - Cuzco (Alejandro Velasco Astete International Airport)
  - Iquitos (Crnl. FAP Francisco Secada Vignetta International Airport)
  - Lima (Jorge Chávez International Airport) Hub

In December 2007, Air Perú flew charter flights to Miami and Washington, D.C. operated for Primaris Airlines.

== Fleet ==
Air Perú planned to operate 2 Boeing 757-200s. Only one was seen in its livery, but was returned to its lessor; Primaris Airlines.

== See also ==
- USGlobal Airways - another proposed airline
- Family Airlines - another proposed airline
