= Aviandina =

IATA	ICAO	Call sign
SJ	VND	AVIANDINA
- Founded: March 21, 1999
- Commenced operations: November 1999
- Ceased operations: 2003
- Hubs: Jorge Chávez International Airport
- Fleet size: 3
- Destinations: 11
- Parent company: Aero Continente
- Headquarters: Lima, Peru
- Key people: Hernán Guerinoni Zanatta (Director General)

Aviandina was a small airline from Peru, which was operational between 1999 and 2003. It was a subsidiary of Aero Continente.

== History ==
The airline was founded on March 21, 1999. It started operations in mid-November of that year, leasing its three jets from AeroContinente, two leased Boeing 727-100s and one Boeing 737-200, and flying a 10-city network from Lima. Zadi Desme, a former AeroContinente consultant, owned 30% of the airline at its start, with the remainder held by an undisclosed foreign investor. Under Peruvian law, enacted in a context of deregulation of the country's commercial aviation sector in the early 1990s, foreigners were entitled to own up to 70% of a local airline.

== Destinations ==
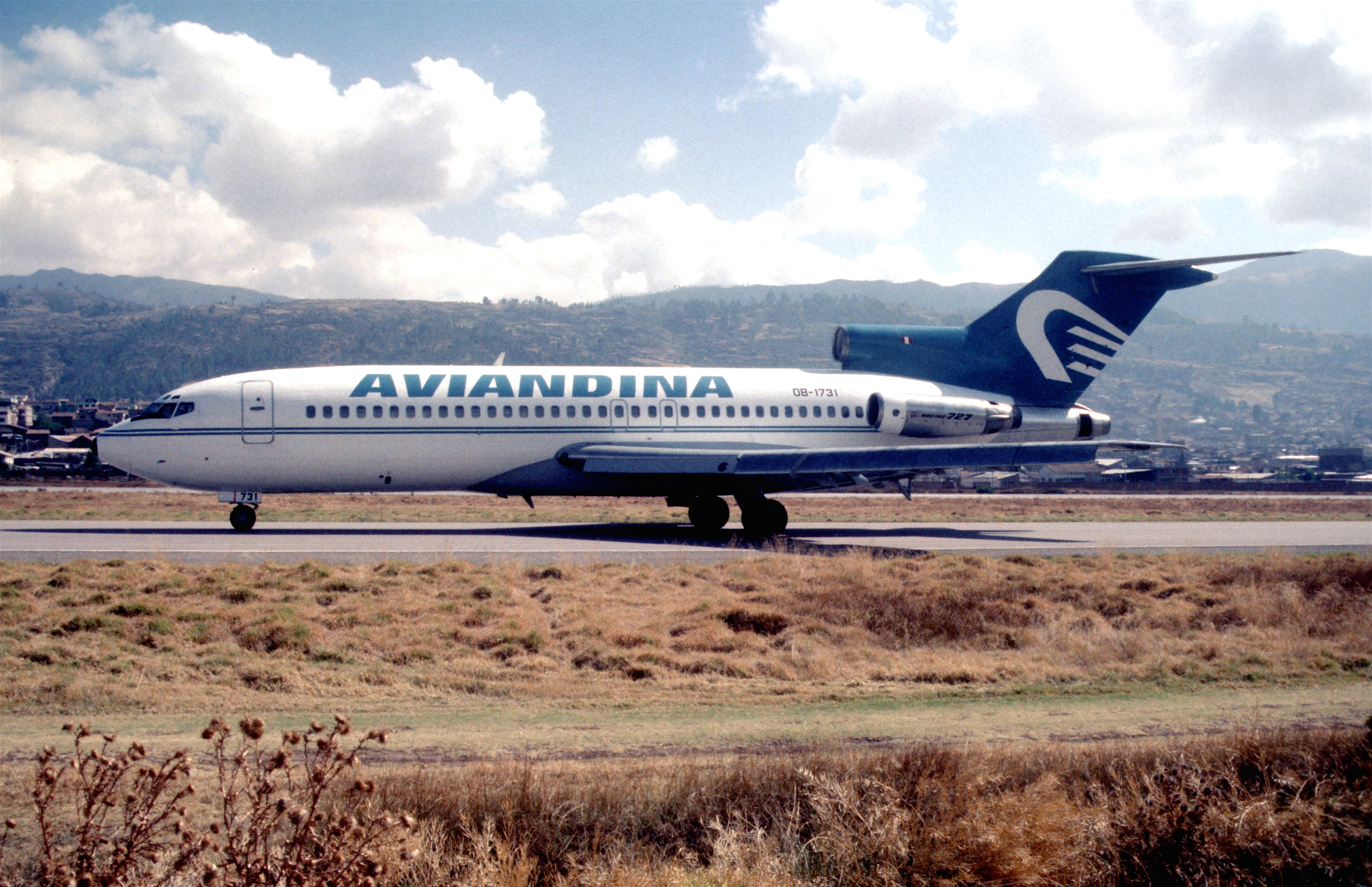
An Aviandina Boeing 727-100 taxiing at Alejandro Velasco Astete International Airport in 2000

Peru

- Arequipa (Rodríguez Ballón International Airport)
- Chiclayo (FAP Captain José Abelardo Quiñones González International Airport)
- Cusco (Alejandro Velasco Astete International Airport)
- Iquitos (Coronel FAP Francisco Secada Vignetta International Airport)
- Juliaca (Inca Manco Cápac International Airport)
- Lima (Jorge Chávez International Airport) Hub
- Piura (PAF Captain Guillermo Concha Iberico International Airport)
- Pucallpa (FAP Captain David Abensur Rengifo International Airport)
- Tacna (Coronel FAP Carlos Ciriani Santa Rosa International Airport)
- Tarapoto (Cadete FAP Guillermo del Castillo Paredes Airport)
- Trujillo (Capitán FAP Carlos Martínez de Pinillos International Airport)

== Fleet ==
Aviandina operated the following aircraft:

Aviandina fleet
Aircraft	Total	Introduced	Retired	Notes
Boeing 727-100	3	1999	2002	
Boeing 737-200	2	2001	2002	Leased from Aero Continente

== Incidents ==
- On March 19, 2000, Aviandina Flight 4173, a Boeing 727-100 (reg. OB-1731) on a scheduled passenger flight from Arequipa to Juliaca deviated to Tacna after suffering an in-flight landing gear failure. The situation forced the crew to divert to Tacna, where the plane landed with its right main landing gear retracted after the pilots flew for over an hour on a holding pattern to burn all aircraft's fuel before the emergency landing. The aircraft sustained substantial damage, but no injuries or fatalities occurred. The plane was scrapped a year later.

== See also ==
- List of defunct airlines of Peru
