= Aeroperú Flight 772 =

1988 crash of a Fokker F28 in Peru

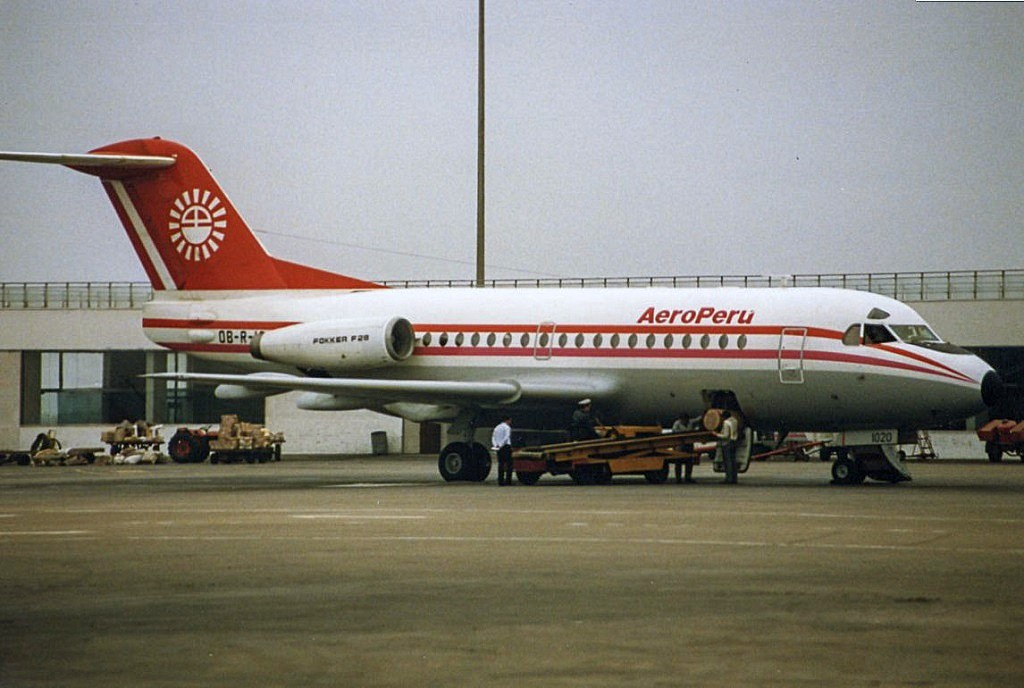
- OB-R-1020, the aircraft involved, pictured in 1987

Occurrence
- Date: 25 October 1988
- Summary: Loss of control on takeoff due to improper flap configuration caused by pilot error
- Site: Near Inca Manco Cápac International Airport, Juliaca, Peru

Aircraft
- Aircraft type: Fokker F28-1000
- Operator: Aeroperú
- Registration: OB-R-1020
- Flight origin: Inca Manco Cápac International Airport, Juliaca, Peru
- Stopover: Rodríguez Ballón International Airport, Arequipa, Peru
- Destination: Jorge Chávez International Airport, Lima, Peru
- Occupants: 69
- Passengers: 65
- Crew: 4
- Fatalities: 12
- Injuries: 44
- Survivors: 57

Aeroperú Flight 772 was a regularly scheduled passenger flight from Juliaca, Peru to Lima, Peru with an intermediate stopover in Arequipa, Peru. On October 25, 1988, the aircraft operating the flight crashed shortly after takeoff from Inca Manco Capac International Airport, killing 12 of the 69 passengers and crew onboard.

This the only plane crash recorded in the Altiplano.

== Background ==
=== Aircraft ===
The aircraft involved was a Fokker F28-1000 Fellowship registered as OB-R-1020, serial no. 11059. Prior to the accident, the aircraft had 35,404 airframe hours and had completed 44,078 total flights. The aircraft was equipped with two Rolls-Royce Spey 555-15 turbofan engines.

=== Crew ===
The crew consisted of captain Fernando Bellido and first officer Gino Ferraro.

== Accident ==
The flight took off from Inca Manco Cápac International Airport at 10:53 local time, the crew raised the gear and the flaps after takeoff, but also retarded the thrust. The aircraft then flew low, crossing a road near the runway before coming to a rest on a riverbed, just over a mile from the airport. The aircraft was broken up into multiple sections, with the front section of the fuselage becoming inverted, and the rear being substantially damaged compared to other sections of the fuselage.

From the perspective of Matt Lumsdaine, a passenger on board, when the pilots tried to control the aircraft, the rear section touched the ground first and broke off as the plane bounced back. The second impact caused the plane to separated into two pieces.

== Cause ==
The investigation found that the crew had improperly configured the plane for takeoff, resulting in the aircraft being unable to gain lift and stalling, leading to impact with the ground.

== See also ==
- Turkish Airlines Flight 301 - Another Fokker F28 which crashed shortly after takeoff.
