= LATAM Airlines Perú =

Flag carrier of Peru

IATA	ICAO	Call sign
LP	LPE	LAN PERÚ
- Founded: July 1998; 28 years ago (as LAN Perú)
- Commenced operations: July 2, 1999; 27 years ago (as LAN Perú); May 5, 2016; 10 years ago (as LATAM Perú)
- Hubs: Lima
- Focus cities: Arequipa; Cusco; Miami
- Frequent-flyer program: LATAM Pass
- Fleet size: 63
- Destinations: 58
- Parent company: LATAM Airlines Group (49%)
- Headquarters: Lima, Peru
- Key people: Manuel van Oordt (CEO)
- Website: www.latam.com

LATAM Airlines Perú (formerly LAN Perú S.A. until 2015) is the flag carrier airline based in Lima, Peru. It is a subsidiary of LATAM Airlines Group of Chile, which owns 49% of the airline. It operates scheduled domestic and international services. Its main hub is Jorge Chávez International Airport. LATAM Perú is the dominant airline in Peru, controlling 73.4% of the domestic market.

== History ==
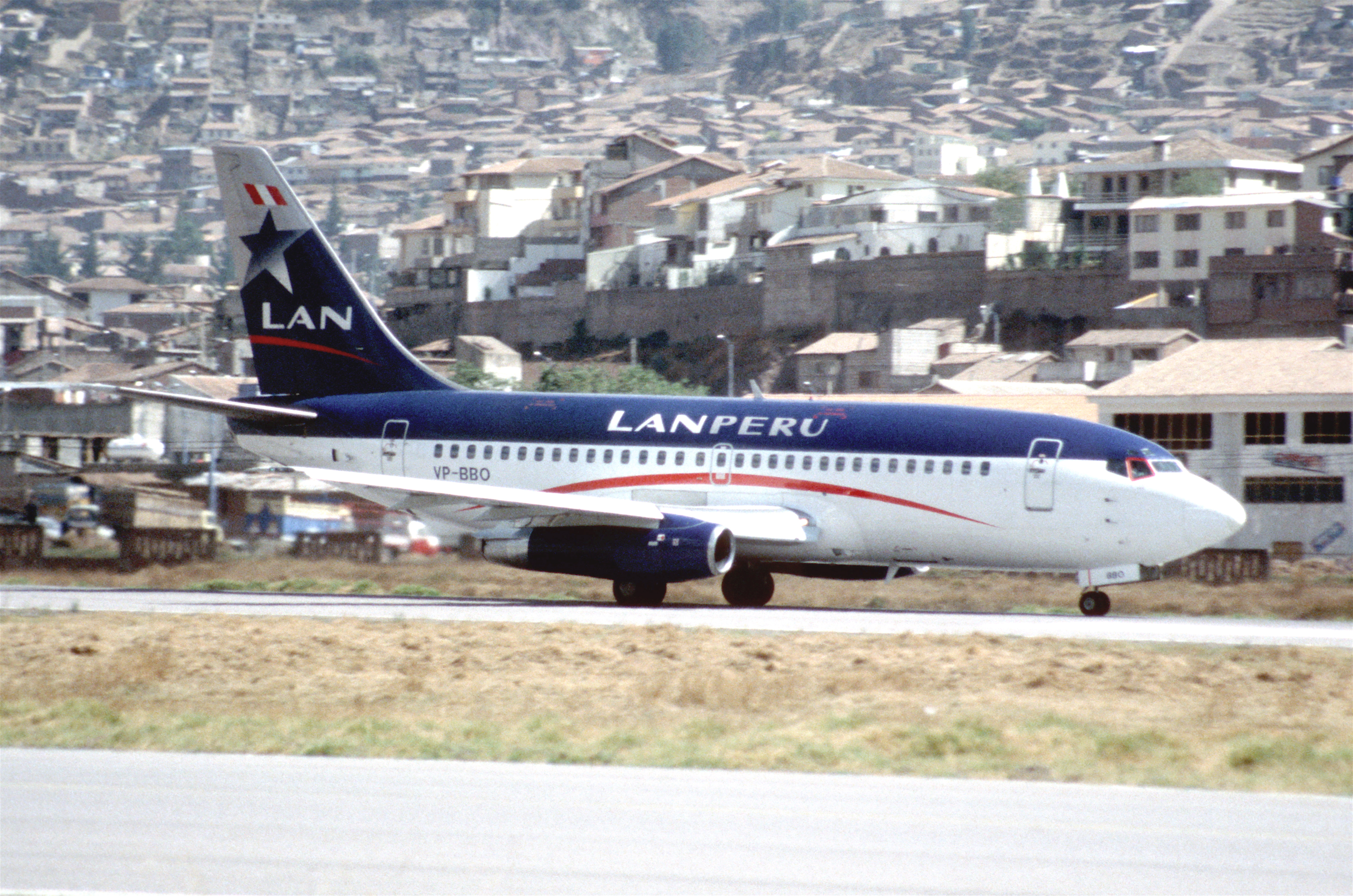
A former LAN Perú Boeing 737-200 at Alejandro Velasco Astete International Airport in 2000

LAN Peru was established in July 1998 by the entrepreneurs Boris Hirmas Rubio, Lorenzo Sousa Debarbieri, Cristian Said and Dr Javier Rodriguez Larrain and LAN-Chile in Lima. Operations began on 2 July 1999, with domestic services from Jorge Chávez International Airport to Cusco and Arequipa. Its launch marked the reappearance of a new major national airline in Peru after the demise of giants Aeroperú, Faucett Perú and others. An international service to Miami was added on November 15, 1999.

The airline became a subsidiary of LAN Airlines in September 2002, owned by LAN (49%), ER Larraín (30%), and Inversiones Aéreas (21%) and has 1,500 employees. In 2004, it was incorporated into LAN Airlines holding with the change of the name of the parent company.

In 2004, a court order temporarily suspended flights because of alleged irregularities in the company's incorporation. Subsequently, the ruling party generated controversy for questioning the work of Judge Eloy Zamalloa, who denounced the promulgation of a decree law that opposed such a judicial decision.

During the third quarter of 2006, LAN Peru added 8 new Airbus A319s to its fleet, intended to replace its Boeing 737-200s for domestic operations in Peruvian territory. In October 2006, LAN Perú obtained authorization from the Peruvian DGAC to operate as an Aeronautical Maintenance Workshop (TMA), granting it the number 029. This allows it, in addition to supporting LAN operations, to offer service to other companies that have aircraft with Peruvian registration.

In 2008, the airline transported about 3.5 million passengers, with 2.9 million in the domestic market. In October 2009, the airline was authorized to provide aircraft maintenance services.

LAN Peru was dissolved on August 6, 2015, upon completion of the merger between LAN Airlines and TAM Airlines announced on August 13, 2010, creating the LATAM Airlines Group, one of the largest commercial airline consortiums in Latin America and one of the largest worldwide. Subsequently, on May 5, 2016 (almost 6 years after the beginning of the merger with TAM Líneas Aéreas) it began to operate officially and definitively as LATAM Airlines, which meant the change of corporate image and brand, which is estimated to cost $60 million US dollars.

On 26 September 2019, Delta Air Lines announced its plans to buy 20% of the LATAM Airlines Group for $1.9 billion, to expand Delta's access to the Latin American market. Additionally, Delta agreed to pay LATAM's exit fee from Oneworld and to take delivery of all Airbus A350 XWB aircraft that LATAM had on order. On 1 January 2020, it was reported that Delta Air Lines' acquisition of the 20% stake in the LATAM group was completed. Group CEO Enrique Cueto stepped down on 31 March 2020, and was succeeded by Roberto Alvo, the group's then-current Chief Commercial Officer. On 31 January 2020, LATAM announced that it would leave Oneworld three months later on 1 May.

On 26 May 2020, the LATAM Airlines Group filed for Chapter 11 bankruptcy in the United States due to economic problems attributed to the impact of the COVID-19 pandemic on aviation, although they are currently operating and have been negotiating terms. In August, the company announced its second-quarter results, projecting improved operational prospects. To assist with the COVID-19 pandemic in Peru, the company announced that its subsidiary LATAM Peru would help distribute vaccines to fifteen provinces in Peru for free.

In 2024, LATAM Peru, along with the other LATAM subsidiaries would receive a new livery with the countries' national colors.

== Destinations ==
As of October 2025, LATAM Perú flies (or has flown) to the following destinations:

Country	City	Airport	Notes	Refs
Argentina	Buenos Aires	Ministro Pistarini International Airport		
Argentina	Córdoba	Ingeniero Ambrosio L.V. Taravella International Airport		
Argentina	Mendoza	Governor Francisco Gabrielli International Airport		
Argentina	Rosario	Rosario – Islas Malvinas International Airport		
Argentina	Salta	Martín Miguel de Güemes International Airport		
Argentina	San Miguel de Tucumán	Teniente General Benjamín Matienzo International Airport		
Bolivia	La Paz	El Alto International Airport		
Bolivia	Santa Cruz de la Sierra	Viru Viru International Airport		
Brazil	Foz do Iguaçu	Foz do Iguaçu International Airport		
Brazil	Rio de Janeiro	Rio de Janeiro/Galeão International Airport		
Brazil	São Paulo	São Paulo/Guarulhos International Airport		
Chile	Antofagasta	Andrés Sabella Gálvez International Airport		
Chile	Concepción	Carriel Sur International Airport		
Chile	Hanga Roa	Mataveri International Airport	Terminated	
Chile	Iquique	Diego Aracena International Airport	Terminated	
Chile	Santiago	Arturo Merino Benítez International Airport		
Colombia	Bogotá	El Dorado International Airport		
Colombia	Cali	Alfonso Bonilla Aragón International Airport		
Colombia	Cartagena	Rafael Núñez International Airport		
Colombia	Medellín	José María Córdova International Airport		
Costa Rica	San José	Juan Santamaría International Airport		
Cuba	Havana	José Martí International Airport		
Dominican Republic	Punta Cana	Punta Cana International Airport		
Ecuador	Quito	Mariscal Sucre International Airport		
France	Paris	Charles de Gaulle Airport	Terminated	
Jamaica	Montego Bay	Sangster International Airport		
Mexico	Cancún	Cancún International Airport		
Mexico	Mexico City	Mexico City International Airport		
Peru	Arequipa	Rodríguez Ballón International Airport	Focus city	
Peru	Ayacucho	Coronel FAP Alfredo Mendívil Duarte Airport		
Peru	Cajamarca	Mayor General FAP Armando Revoredo Iglesias Airport		
Peru	Chiclayo	FAP Captain José Abelardo Quiñones González International Airport		
Peru	Cusco	Alejandro Velasco Astete International Airport	Focus city	
Peru	Iquitos	Coronel FAP Francisco Secada Vignetta International Airport		
Peru	Jaén	Jaén Airport		
Peru	Jauja	Francisco Carle Airport		
Peru	Juliaca	Inca Manco Cápac International Airport		
Peru	Lima	Jorge Chávez International Airport	Hub	
Peru	Piura	PAF Captain Guillermo Concha Iberico International Airport		
Peru	Pucallpa	FAP Captain David Abensur Rengifo International Airport		
Peru	Puerto Maldonado	Padre Aldamiz International Airport		
Peru	Tacna	Coronel FAP Carlos Ciriani Santa Rosa International Airport		
Peru	Talara	Capitán FAP Víctor Montes Arias International Airport		
Peru	Tarapoto	Cadete FAP Guillermo del Castillo Paredes Airport		
Peru	Trujillo	Capitán FAP Carlos Martínez de Pinillos International Airport		
Peru	Tumbes	FAP Captain Pedro Canga Rodríguez Airport		
Spain	Barcelona	Josep Tarradellas Barcelona–El Prat Airport		
Spain	Madrid	Adolfo Suárez Madrid–Barajas Airport		
United Kingdom	London	Heathrow Airport	Terminated	
United States	Los Angeles	Los Angeles International Airport		
United States	Miami	Miami International Airport	Focus city	
United States	Orlando	Orlando International Airport		
United States	New York City	John F. Kennedy International Airport		
United States	San Francisco	San Francisco International Airport	Terminated	
United States	Washington, D.C.	Dulles International Airport	Terminated	
Uruguay	Montevideo	Carrasco International Airport		
Venezuela	Caracas	Simón Bolívar International Airport	Terminated	

=== Codeshare agreements ===
LATAM Perú has codeshare agreements with the following airlines:

- Korean Air
- WestJet

== Fleet ==
=== Current fleet ===
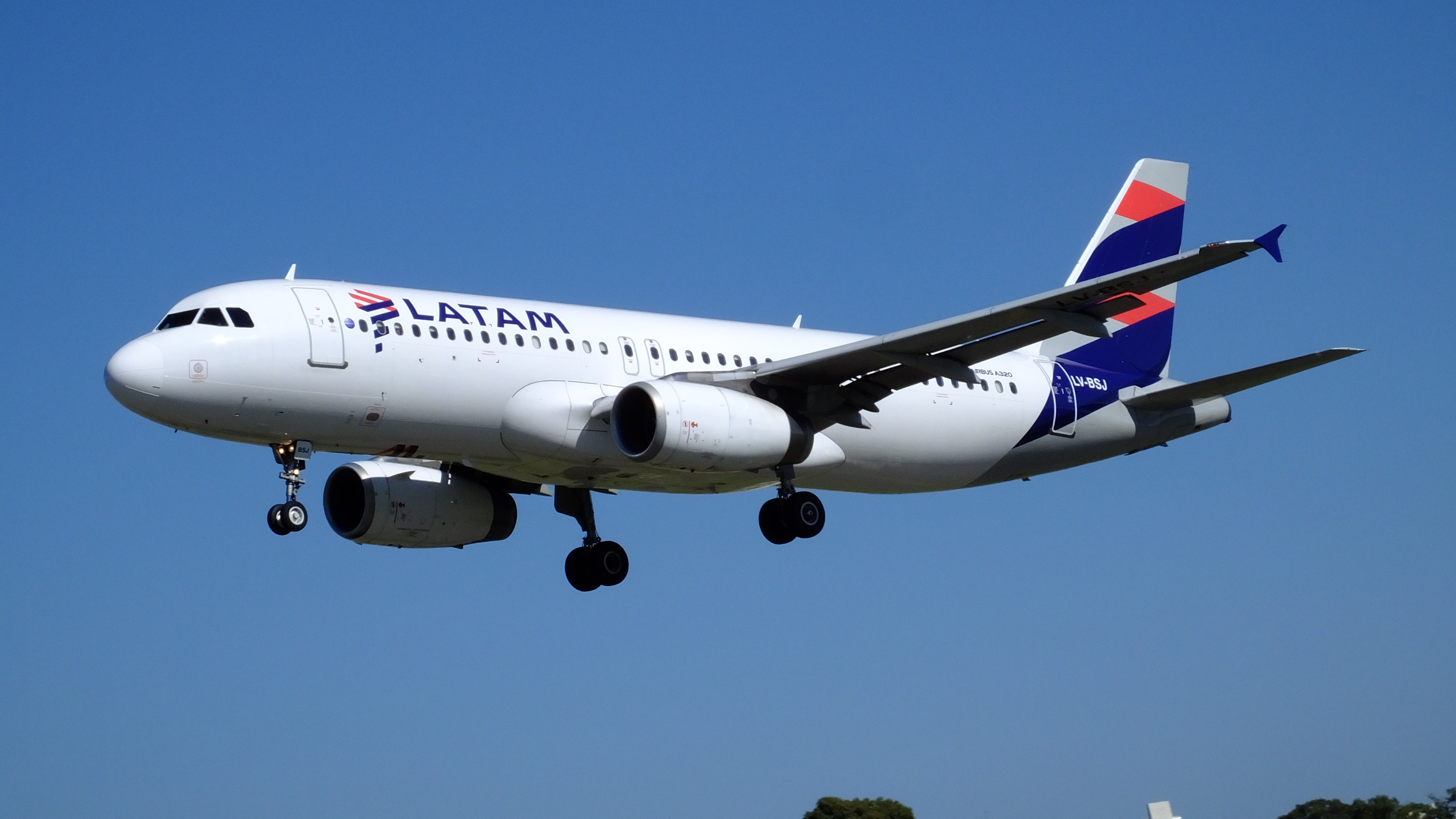
A LATAM Peru Airbus A320-200

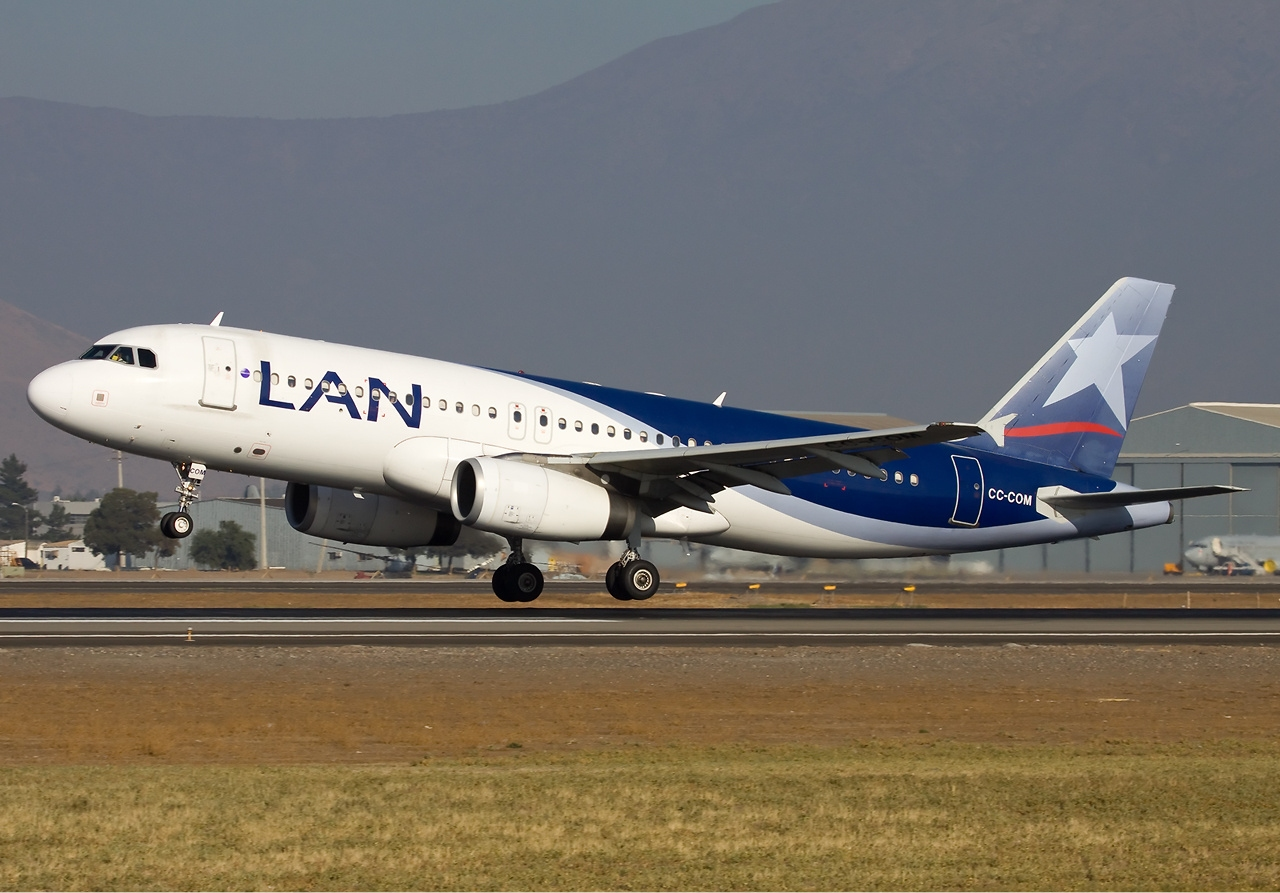
A LAN Perú Airbus A320-200 in the former name and livery

As of October 2025, LATAM Perú operates the following aircraft:

LATAM Perú fleet
Aircraft	In service	Orders	Passengers			Notes
Aircraft	In service	Orders	J	Y	Total	Notes
Airbus A319-100	12	—	–	144	144	
Airbus A320-200	34	—	–	174	174	
Airbus A320neo	6	—	–	174	174	
Boeing 767-300ER	9	—	20	211	231	
Boeing 787-9	2	—	TBA			
Total	63	—				

== Accidents and incidents ==
- On November 18, 2022, LATAM Perú Flight 2213, an Airbus A320neo (registered CC-BHB) was taking off from Jorge Chávez International Airport when it collided with a fire engine that was crossing the runway, killing two firefighters and seriously injuring a third. All 102 passengers and 6 crew aboard the aircraft escaped with 4 receiving serious injuries and 36 receiving minor injuries.

== See also ==
- List of airlines of Peru
