= Aero Continente Chile =

IATA	ICAO	Call sign
C7	NTI	-
- Founded: 1999
- Ceased operations: 2002
- Hubs: Arturo Merino Benítez International Airport
- Fleet size: 6
- Parent company: Aero Continente
- Headquarters: Santiago, Chile

Aero Continente Chile was a passenger airline from Chile, that operated scheduled domestic and international flights out of Arturo Merino Benítez International Airport on behalf of its parent company, Aero Continente from Peru.

== History ==
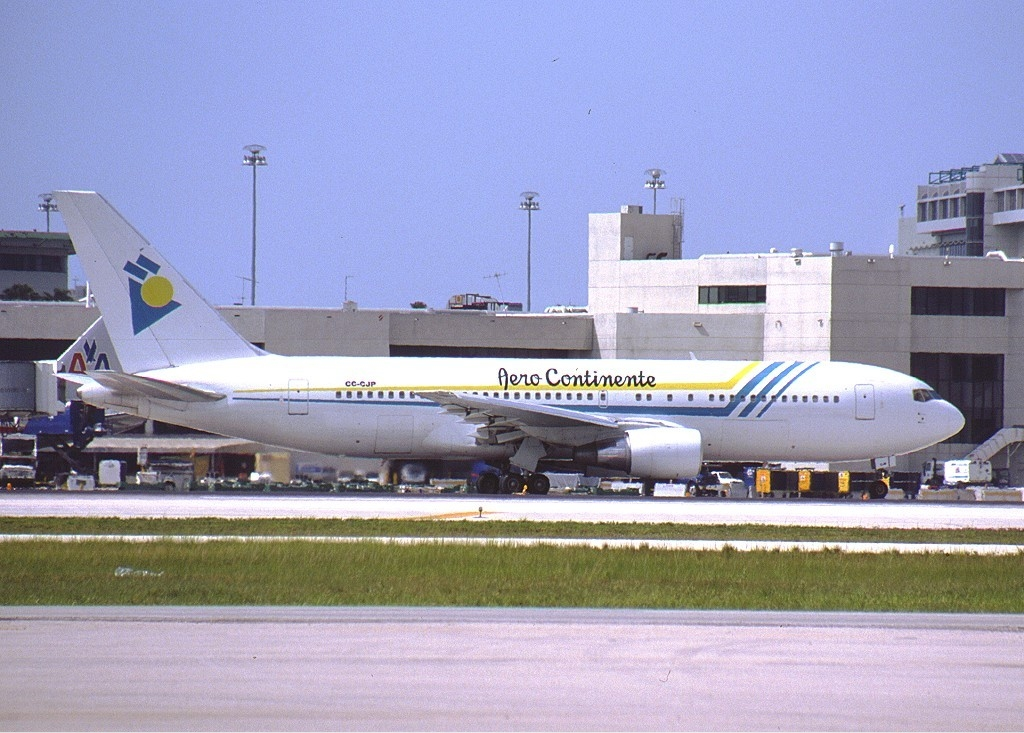
An Aero Continente Chile Boeing 767-200ER at Miami International Airport in 2001

In 1999, Aero Continente decided to set up a subsidiary in Chile in order to get access to the Chilean domestic market, in addition to its native Peruvian one, where it was just about to acquire a monopoly position at that time. Thus, Aero Continente Chile was founded, operating domestic flights within Chile under different airline codes than its parent. From 2000, it also operated international flights to Miami, which were routed via Lima in order to connect with the feeder flights of Aero Continente there.

In 2002, the company was grounded by Chilean authorities over allegations of illegal drug trade involving Fernando Zevallos, the airline's founder. Aero Continente claimed that this was rather a measure of protecting LAN Airlines from the competition, but ultimately decided to re-integrate the Chilean subsidiary back into the mainline business.

== Fleet ==
Aero Continente Chile operated a fleet that consisted of 5 Boeing 737-200 and 1 Boeing 767-200ER. All aircraft had been handed down from mainline Aero Continente.

== See also ==
- List of defunct airlines of Chile
