= Fly Perú =

Peruvian airline

Fly Perú Airlines
- Founded: 2021
- Hubs: Jorge Chávez International Airport
- Headquarters: Lima, Peru

Fly Perú is a proposed Peruvian airline.

== History ==
Fly Perú received its Air operator's certificate from the Peruvian Government on May 31, 2021 and was expected to start operations in late 2022. It is expected to fly through all of Peru's provinces.

== See also ==
- List of airlines of Peru
