= Magenta Air =

| IATA | ICAO | Call sign |
|---|---|---|
| I2 | - | - |
- Founded: 2002
- Commenced operations: September 2002
- Ceased operations: 2005
- Hubs: Jorge Chávez International Airport
- Fleet size: 2
- Destinations: 5
- Headquarters: Lima, Peru

Magenta Air was an airline based in Lima, Peru, which operated scheduled domestic services.

== History ==
The airline was established in 2002 and started operations in September of that year. It was wholly owned by Peruvian nationals. Its first aircraft, a Bombardier Dash 8 Q100 had already been acquired in July. In 2004, a Boeing 737-200 joined the fleet. Both aircraft were withdrawn from service in early 2005, which marks the end of the Managnta Air flight operations. Its assets were sold to Aero Continente and Star Perú.

== Destinations ==
At January 2005 Magenta Air operated scheduled services to the following domestic destinations: Cajamarca, Iquitos, Lima, Pucallpa and Tarapoto.

== Fleet ==
The airline had formerly operated the following aircraft:

- 1 Boeing 737-200 (Leased from Atlantic Airlines de Honduras)
- 1 Bombardier Dash 8 Q100
