= Aero Continente Dominicana =

IATA	ICAO	Call sign
9D	CND	CONDOMINICANA
- Founded: 2001
- Ceased operations: August 2003
- Hubs: Las Américas International Airport
- Fleet size: 1
- Destinations: 2
- Parent company: Aero Continente
- Headquarters: Santo Domingo, Dominican Republic

Aero Continente Dominicana was short-lived airline based in Santo Domingo, Dominican Republic, operating out of Las Américas International Airport on behalf of Aero Continente from Peru, its parent company.

== History ==
Aero Continente decided to establish a wholly owned subsidiary in Santo Domingo in 2001. Over the following months, a limited number of scheduled flights to Miami were offered. In August 2003, the aircraft was returned to Aero Continente, which marked the end of the Dominicana subsidiary.

== Destinations ==
Dominican Republic

- Santo Domingo - Las Américas International Airport Hub

United States

- Miami - Miami International Airport

== Fleet ==
Aero Continente Dominicana owned a single Boeing 737-200 by May 2002.

== See also ==
- List of defunct airlines of the Dominican Republic
