= Faucett Perú Flight 251 =

1996 aviation accident

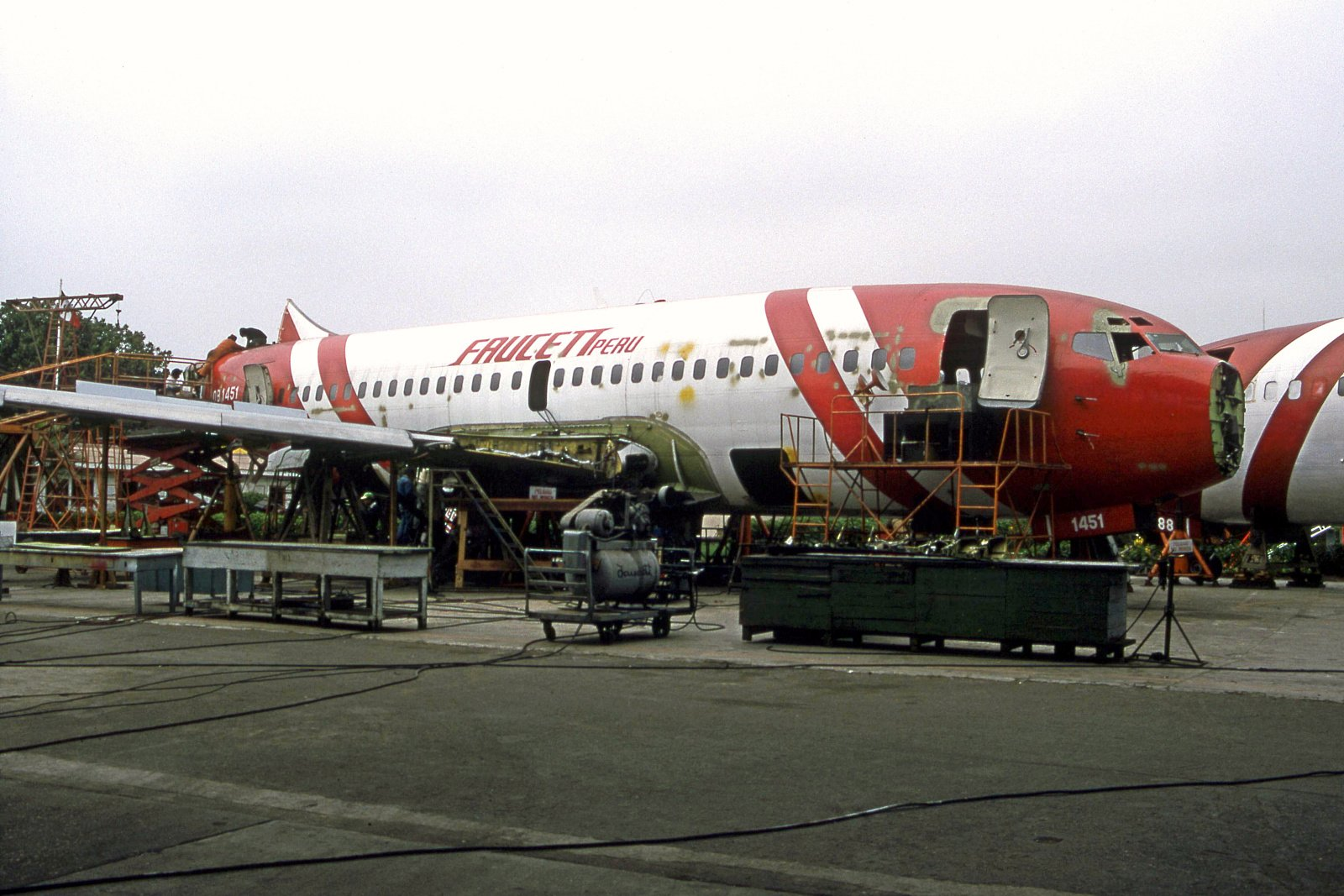
- OB-1451, the aircraft involved in the accident, pictured while under maintenance in 1994

Accident
- Date: 29 February 1996
- Summary: Controlled flight into terrain
- Site: Near Ciudad de Dios, Yura District, Arequipa, Peru; 16°19′57″S 71°38′11″W

Aircraft
- Aircraft type: Boeing 737–222
- Operator: Compañía de Aviación Faucett
- IATA flight No.: CF251
- ICAO flight No.: CFP251
- Call sign: FAUCETT 251
- Registration: OB-1451
- Flight origin: Jorge Chávez International Airport; Lima, Peru
- Stopover: Rodríguez Ballón Int'l Airport; Arequipa, Peru
- Destination: Crnl. FAP C. C. Santa Rosa Int'l Airport; Tacna, Peru
- Occupants: 123
- Passengers: 117
- Crew: 6
- Fatalities: 123
- Survivors: 0

Faucett Perú Flight 251 was a scheduled domestic flight from Lima to Tacna, with a stopover in Arequipa. On 29 February 1996, while completing the first leg, the Boeing 737-200 operating the route crashed on approach to Rodríguez Ballón International Airport. All 123 passengers and crew aboard the aircraft lost their lives in the accident. It is the deadliest aviation accident to occur on Peruvian soil.

== Aircraft and crew ==
The aircraft involved in the accident was a Boeing 737-222, tail number OB-1451, c/n 19072, that had its maiden flight on 21 October 1968.

The aircraft it was piloted by Captain Juan Mayta Basurto and First Officer Julio Paz Castillo; both pilots were qualified to fly the 737.

== Description ==
Inbound from Jorge Chávez International Airport, the aircraft was on a VOR/DME approach to Rodríguez Ballón International Airport's runway 09, at night, in rain and mist, with thunderstorms reported in the area.

The flight crew asked for the runway lights to be brightened because they could not see them during a normal approach, and air traffic controllers responded that they were at full intensity. The airplane crashed into hills at 8,200 feet (2,500 m) —the airport elevation is 8,405 feet (2,562 m)—, at 20:25, (Note: Also reported to have occurred at 20:15.) approximately 2 kilometres (1.2 mi; 1.1 nmi) short of the runway and 8 kilometres (5.0 mi; 4.3 nmi) off Arequipa. The aft section broke off on impact, and the main fuselage section continued to fly past the initial ridge and impacted near the top of the second one. The tail section fell into a crevasse between the two ridges.

The aircraft carried 123 people, of whom 117 were passengers. The nationalities of the victims were as follows:

Nationality	Passengers	Crew	Total
Peru	77	6	83
Chile	33	0	33
Belgium	2	0	2
Canada	2	0	2
Bolivia	2	0	2
United States	2	0	2
Brazil	1	0	1
Total	117	6	123

Among those killed was Juan Lorenzo de Szyszlo, a dual American-Peruvian citizen aged 36, who was the second son of renowned Peruvian painter Fernando de Szyszlo and his wife, the poet Blanca Varela. Lorenzo was reportedly heading to Arequipa to oversee an exhibition of his father's work there.

== Investigation ==
The investigation was assisted by representatives from the US National Transportation Safety Board (NTSB) and Federal Aviation Administration, as well as Boeing and Pratt & Whitney, all of whom arrived at the scene of the crash by 1 March. The aircraft's flight data recorder (FDR) and cockpit voice recorder (CVR) were retrieved from the wreckage and on 5 March were sent to Washington D.C. for analysis by the NTSB.

Early press coverage reported that the FDR and CVR were already yielding information. However, while the FDR was usable, the partly burned and partly damaged CVR had its magnetic tape broken at the beginning, and only isolated Spanish-language voices could be heard. These were seemingly recorded inside a hangar, possibly during maintenance, and thus no recording of the flight crew's final voices before the crash was made. The airline claimed to have acquired the CVR in July 1995 and to have done maintenance on it on two occasions immediately prior to the crash (December 1995 and February 1996); however, the CVR had not been maintained in six years, showing in its interior registry that the date of its last opening was December 1989.

It was found that the crew had been issued an outdated barometric altimeter setting after bypassing an ILS signal, causing them to fly almost 1,000 feet (300 m) lower than the altitude they believed they were flying at. In fact, they had the wrong impression the aircraft was flying at 9,500 feet (2,900 m), when it actually was at 8,640 feet (2,630 m), some 850 feet (260 m) below the glideslope.

== See also ==
- List of unrecovered and unusable flight recorders
- TAME Flight 173 - A similar accident occurred in nearby Ecuador more than a decade earlier and also the worst aerial crash in that country's history.
