= Family Airlines =

Proposed American low-cost airline

Avatar Airlines
- Founded: September 1992 (as Family Airlines)
- Headquarters: Boca Raton, Florida, United States
- Key people: Barry Michaels (CEO)
- Website: avatarairlines.com

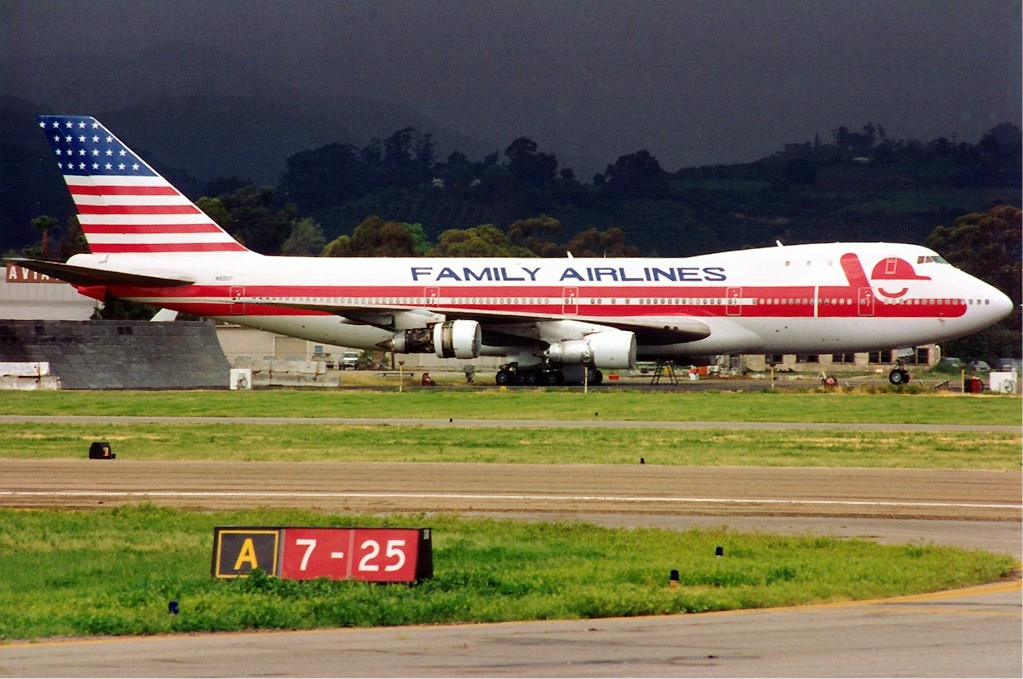
A former Boeing 747-100 of Family Airlines.

Family Airlines, later called Avatar Airlines, was an American low-cost airline proposed in the 1990s.

== History ==
The airline gained press attention after it said that it would offer US$249 fares from Los Angeles to New York City. The airline announced that it would cater to family travelers who found traditional airlines to be too expensive. In June 1992 Barry Michaels, the chief executive, said that "For the most part, we're looking at the leisure market, although there will be some business traffic, particularly on the San Francisco-Los Angeles sector." The airline announced that it would use "between three and five Boeing 747-100/200s" and that the first routing would go from Las Vegas to Los Angeles to Newark, New Jersey to Miami to Las Vegas. The airline also announced that it was negotiating lease and purchase deals with European and Asian carriers involving parked 747-200s in desert areas and one involving a former Pan Am 747-100.

In an August 1992 article in The Philadelphia Inquirer, Donald D. Groff compared Family Airlines to People Express Airlines. Family Airlines, which moved into a building in the Las Vegas Valley adjacent to McCarran International Airport in September 1992, stated that it planned to start Las Vegas to Los Angeles and Las Vegas to Newark in November 1992 and later begin services to San Francisco, Phoenix, Honolulu, Miami, and Boston. The airline also announced that it would begin service to Honolulu from Los Angeles or San Francisco for $249.

In March 1993, the Federal Aviation Administration announced that it would no longer process the airline's application to begin service. In April 1993, after the United States Department of Transportation reviewed lawsuits and judgments against founder Barry Michaels, the agency asked him to relinquish control of the proposed airline. On April 27 Michaels agreed to do so. On June 24, 1996, the Securities and Exchange Commission filed a suit against Michaels and his wife, Holly S. Michaels, for fraudulently offering unregistered stock for the airline. A federal judge in California ordered the couple to return $363,306 to the investors and pay $181,000 per person in civil penalties.

In January 2008, Family Airlines reappeared when a new application was filed with the Department of Transportation, with Michaels as chief executive officer. The airline intended to operate up to 12 Boeing 747-400s in a 581-seat configuration in its first year of operation. Initial service would be between Los Angeles, New York, and Miami, with additional destinations to be added in the first year. Observers noted there were no significant changes from the airline's 1990s business plan, and a year later the airline's application was denied.

In 2010, the airline filed again, this time under the name Avatar Airlines, however the application did not proceed. In March 2014, Avatar relocated its corporate headquarters to Boca Raton, Florida and filed another application with the Department of Transportation, according to which Michaels no longer held a management position with the company. However, that same month, Michaels met with airport officials in Jacksonville, Florida where he represented himself as the chairman of the airline.

According to Barry Michael's personal LinkedIn resume, Avatar Airlines began again in April 2019 and as of March 2020 it was noted as based in Boca Raton Florida with Barry Michaels as CEO. The business model remains similar to the earlier Family Airlines and Avatar Airlines models, namely a Boeing 747 fleet and low cost fares with an added focus of long haul cargo transportation. As of December 2020, the status of FAA and DOT certifications are unknown and operations have not yet commenced.

== See also ==
- List of defunct airlines of the United States
