= Fernando Zevallos =

Peruvian drug trafficker (born 1957)

Fernando Melciades Zevallos González, also known as Fernando Melciades Zevallos Gonzáles, is the founder and owner of what was Peru's largest airline, Aero Continente. The airline operated from 1992 until 2004, but was forced to close that year after Mr Zevallos was added to America's list of drug kingpins, with the airline being placed on a blacklist of companies with links to drug traffickers. The moves prevented American companies from doing business with the airline. This meant that Aero Continente could neither buy spare parts for its US-built planes nor insure them. It quickly collapsed.

== Early life ==
Zevallos was born on July 8, 1957, in Mariscal Cáceres Province, San Martín Region, Perú. He graduated from the Peruvian Air Force Academy, becoming a pilot. In 1976 and following his father's death, he retired from the Air Force to look after his father's estate. He had inherited a considerable amount of money.

== Career ==
In 1978, the Peruvian government began a campaign of tax incentives for companies that invested in the Peruvian jungle. The Zevallos family decided to incorporate an air taxi company called TAUSA, with the aim of offering aerial services to the villages of the Peruvian jungle which were not served by suitable terrestrial transport. The company was not successful and Zevallos emigrated to the United States.

During this period, he founded a new company, Aero Continente. At the end of 1994, he settled in the USA permanently, prompting him to give up his shares of the company. He quit the board of Aero Continente in January 1995, later becoming an adviser.

Aero Continente grew to become one of Peru's leading airlines. But on the eve of 2004's, Copa America in Peru, Aero Continente was grounded. Persistent allegations of money-laundering and drug-trafficking had dogged the company for years. At this point, the US authorities added Zavallos to their list of drug kingpins. Unable to secure insurance for its fleet, Aero Continente was grounded.

== Accusations and charges ==
Fernando Zevallos has been the subject of more than 30 investigations according to the US Drug Enforcement Administration, although none of these have led to any criminal charges. In 2004, he was put on the US's list of drug kingpins under the Foreign Narcotics Kingpin Designation Act, labeling him one of the top drug-traffickers in the world. Terry Parham, director of the US Drug Enforcement Administration's Lima office, went on record as describing Zevallos as the "Al Capone of Perú".

The founder of Aero Continente has denied any connection with drug trafficking and has demanded that the United States government show proof of such accusations. Neither Aero Continente nor its founder Zevallos were ever tried or found guilty of these accusations prior to their addition to the list. Zevallos has been a Permanent legal resident of the United States for over 15 years and was quoted as calling his inclusion to The Foreign Narcotics Kingpin Designation Act "unconstitutional" since he was denied his right to due process.

In his home country, Zevallos had faced charges of contract murder, cocaine trafficking and money laundering, but had never been convicted of any such allegation. In November 2005, a Peruvian court found him guilty of drugs-trafficking offenses. He was sentenced to 20 years in jail and barred from holding public office. This was his only conviction, and he was convicted over a year following his inclusion to the controversial Kingpin Act. Zevallos's attorney claims that due to the tremendous pressure of the United States Drug Enforcement Administration (DEA) and the Bush administration, a conviction in Peru was just a matter of time. Zevallos' defense appeal is still pending, due to be heard by Peru's Supreme Court. Zevallos has also filed a complaint to the Inter-American Court of Human Rights.

In November 2006, accusations emerged to suggest Zevallos had deep links with Peru's disgraced former spy-chief, Vladimiro Montesinos. The accusations were made by convicted drug dealer Jorge Polaco Chavez Montoya. Both Zevallos and Montesinos have denied any links.

In July 2007, he was indicted for allegedly conspiring to violate the Foreign Narcotics Kingpin Designation Act.

In September 2007, a request, on behalf of Fernando Zevallos, was made to the United States Attorney for the Southern District of Florida, requesting that he be extradited to the United States of America to face charges. Peru and the United States have an extradition treaty that allows the extradition of individuals for a specific short period, while facing trial or even after conviction. The request was denied, but Zevallos’ defense has requested his extradition to the United States again in January 2009.
