= Andrea Air =

Brief domestic airline in Peru

- Founded: 1991
- Ceased operations: 1991
- Operating bases: Jorge Chávez International Airport
- Fleet size: 2
- Destinations: 3
- Headquarters: Lima, Peru

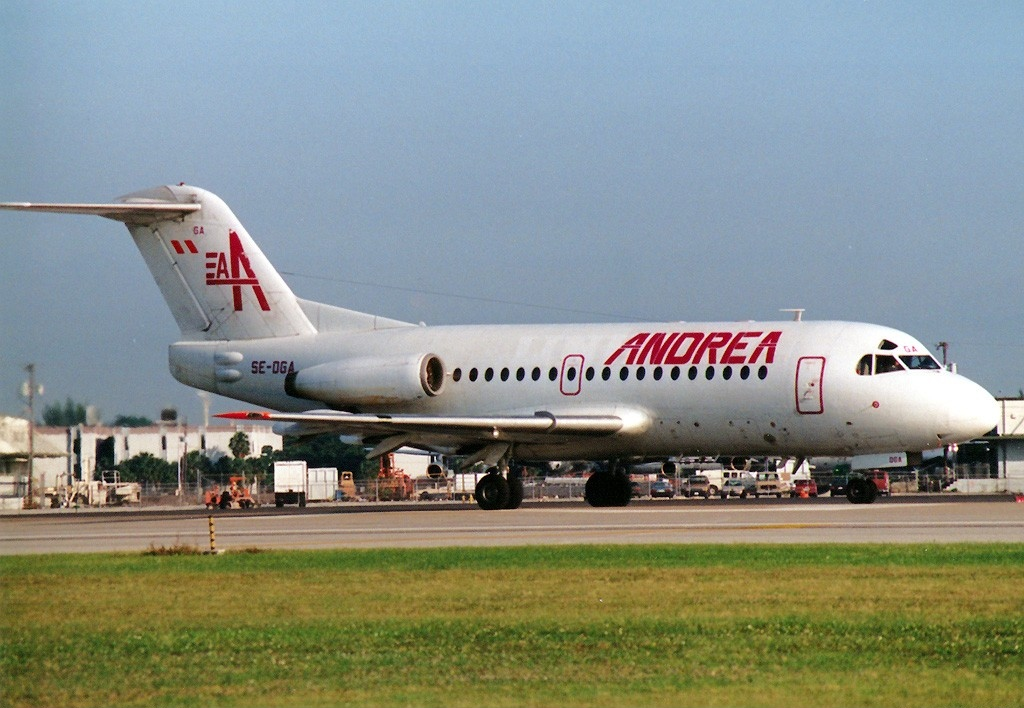
Andrea Air's leased Fokker F-28-1000 at Miami International Airport while being ferried back to Sweden

Andrea Air was a short-lived domestic airline in Peru. It was one of several short-lived airlines that emerged and later folded in the first half of the 1990s following the deregulation of Peru's commercial aviation sector that occurred during the period of economic liberalization policies of President Alberto Fujimori after the country's 1980s crisis.

For a period in 1991, it flew between Lima, Arequipa and Cuzco with a fleet of two leased Fokker F28.

== Fleet ==
Andrea Air operated a fleet of two Swedish registered Fokker F-28-1000 aircraft, SE-DGA (MSN11067) and SE-DGC (MSN11069). Both were leased in from Linjeflyg and went back to SAS after being repossessed half a year later. SE-DGB (MSN11068) was also leased at one point, but the transaction was canceled before the aircraft entered service.
