= Servicio Aéreo Ejecutivo =

Peruvian air taxi operator

IATA	ICAO	Call sign
-	SEJ	Ejecutivo Peru
- Founded: 1990
- Ceased operations: 1995
- Headquarters: Lima, Peru

Servicio Aéreo Ejecutivo (ICAO: SEJ, call sign: Ejecutivo Peru) (SAE) was a small air taxi operator in Peru that later expanded operations to include charter passenger and cargo flights.

== Company history ==
SAE began operations as a small air taxi/charter operator using British Aerospace BAe 125 business jets. In 1991, operations were expanded with the acquisition of a Boeing 707-320C for transporting passengers for El Al and LAP Paraguay.

With the B707-320C, freight flights were begun twice a week between Lima and Iquitos carrying produce, meat, and wood. This aircraft was also used for charter flights throughout South America, Central America, and Mexico. An interline agreement with Transbrasil allowed SAE to operate a route between Manaus, Buenos Aires, and Manaus.

In 1992, these operations were interrupted twice when the 707 was sent to Africa on a contract that lasted until 1995. Operations were re-initiated from Lima, but due to internal problems, the Peruvian government cancelled the operating permit for SAE, and the airline ceased to exist.

== Fleet ==
- 1 - British Aerospace BAe 125
- 1 - Boeing 707-320C
