= Primaris Airlines =

American charter airline

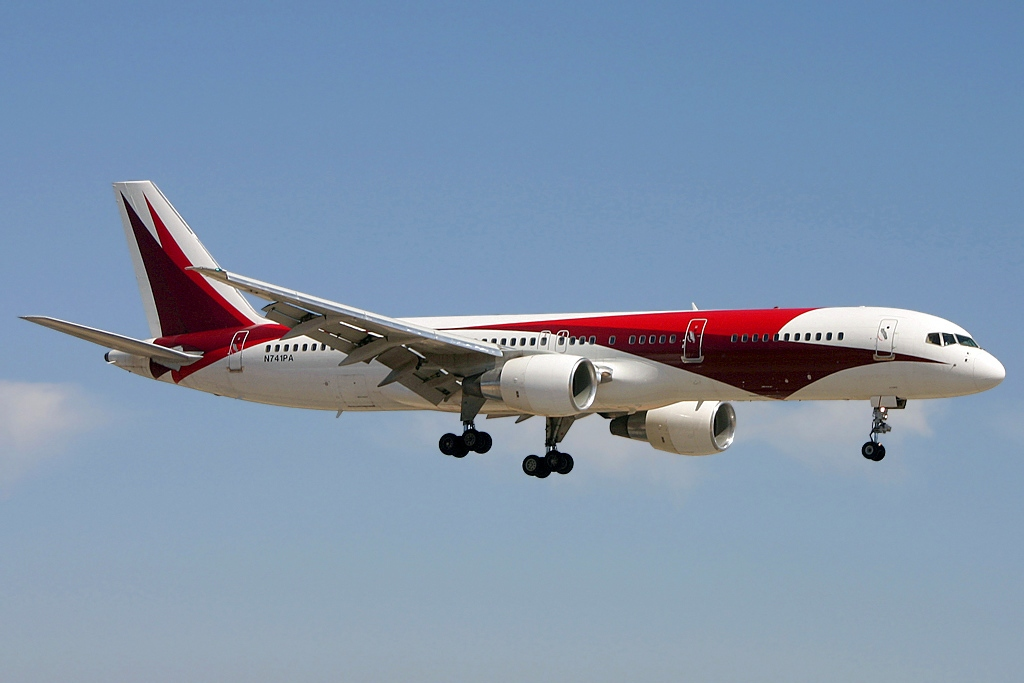
IATA	ICAO	Call sign
FE	WCP	WHITECAP
- Founded: 2002
- Commenced operations: June 1, 2004
- Ceased operations: December 2, 2008
- Operating bases: McCarran International Airport
- Fleet size: 3
- Headquarters: Enterprise, Nevada, United States
- Founder: Mark Morris (CEO)
- Employees: 140 (as of January 2008)
- Website: primarisairlines.com

Primaris Airlines, Inc. was an American charter airline located in Enterprise, Nevada. It operated domestic and international services.

== History ==
The airline was established in 2002 and started operations on June 1, 2004. It achieved an FAA certified Part 121 certification in June 2004 as a Domestic, Flag, and supplemental operator. It achieved 180-minute ETOPS certification on November 3, 2006.

Primaris operated the Kona Shuttle for a few years from Oakland, CA (OAK) to Kona, Hawaii (KOA).

On October 10, 2008, Primaris Airlines filed for Chapter 11 bankruptcy protection in U.S.Bankruptcy Court, District of Arizona, and suspended operations on December 2, 2008, due to a lack of available funding. After several months attempting to secure continuation funding, the CH.11 trustee moved to convert the filing to CH.7 liquidation on March 30, 2009.

== Fleet ==
Primaris Airlines included the following aircraft:

Aircraft	Total	Passengers (Business)	Notes
Boeing 757-200	3	126	

Primaris previously placed an order for 20 Boeing 737-800 and another 20 for the then-upcoming Boeing 787 Dreamliner. The airline planned to use these aircraft to expand its services internationally, but canceled the orders in June 2006. No reason was given for the order cancellation.

== See also ==
- List of defunct airlines of the United States
