= AviaSelva =

- Founded: 2007
- Ceased operations: 2008
- Hubs: Crnl. FAP Francisco Secada Vignetta International Airport
- Destinations: See Destinations below
- Headquarters: Iquitos, Peru

AviaSelva was a Peruvian airline headquartered in Iquitos, Peru. Their main hub was at the Crnl. FAP Francisco Secada Vignetta International Airport in that same city. Most of their destinations were chartered. It operated interdepartmental flights in Peru, Brazil and Colombia.

== History ==
The airline operated between 2007 and 2008.

== Fleet ==
They operated Cessna 206 aircraft.

== Destinations ==
- Peru:
  - Iquitos – Coronel FAP Francisco Secada Vignetta International Airport
  - Juanjuí – Juanjuí Airport
  - Pucallpa – Capitán Rolden International Airport
  - Tarapoto – Comandante FAP Guillermo del Castillo Paredes Airport
  - Yurimaguas – Moisés Benzaquén Rengifo Airport
- Colombia:
  - Leticia – Alfredo Vásquez Cobo International Airport
