= Alejandro Velasco Astete International Airport =

Airport serving Cusco, Peru

Alejandro Velasco Astete International Airport Aeropuerto Internacional Alejandro Velasco Astete
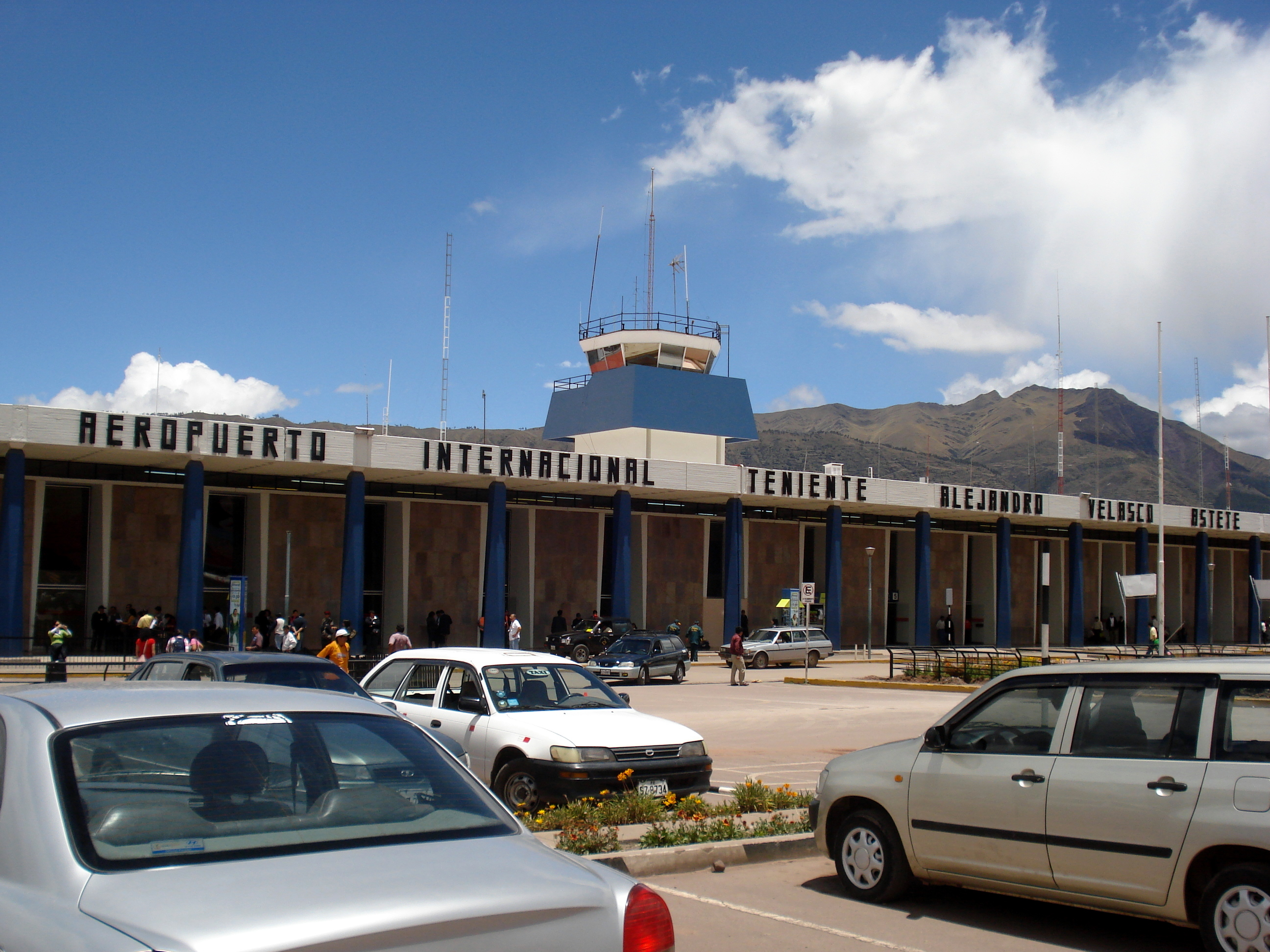
- Aerial overview of CUZ
- IATA: CUZ; ICAO: SPZO

Summary
- Airport type: Public
- Operator: CORPAC S.A.
- Serves: Cusco
- Opened: December 1964; 61 years ago
- Focus city for: LATAM Airlines Perú
- Elevation AMSL: 10,860 ft (3,310 m)
- Coordinates: 13°32′08″S 71°56′37″W
- Website: www.gob.pe/corpac

Map
- Location of airport in Peru

Runways
Direction	Length		Surface
Direction	ft	m	Surface
10/28	11,146	3,397	Asphalt

Statistics (2023)
- Total Passengers: 3,004,412
- Aircraft operations: 23,373
- Source: Corporación Peruana de Aeropuertos y Aviación Comercial

Alejandro Velasco Astete International Airport (IATA: CUZ, ICAO: SPZO) is an international airport located in the city of Cusco, in southeastern Peru. Cusco, a principal tourist attraction in Latin America, receives various domestic flights as well as some international flights. The runway is completely paved. It operates at limited capacity due to its precarious location near the city's center. Despite these limitations, the airport has consistently ranked as Peru's second most important air terminal, handling 3,004,412 national and international passengers in 2023, as reported by CORPAC.

== Name ==
It was named in honor of the Peruvian pilot Alejandro Velasco Astete who was the first aeroplane pilot to cross the Andes in 1925. This first flight was from Lima directly to Cusco. Later that year, in September, while trying to avoid crashing into spectators at an airshow in the city of Puno he crashed and was killed. In recognition of his pioneering achievements in Peruvian aviation history, the airport was named in his honor.

== History ==
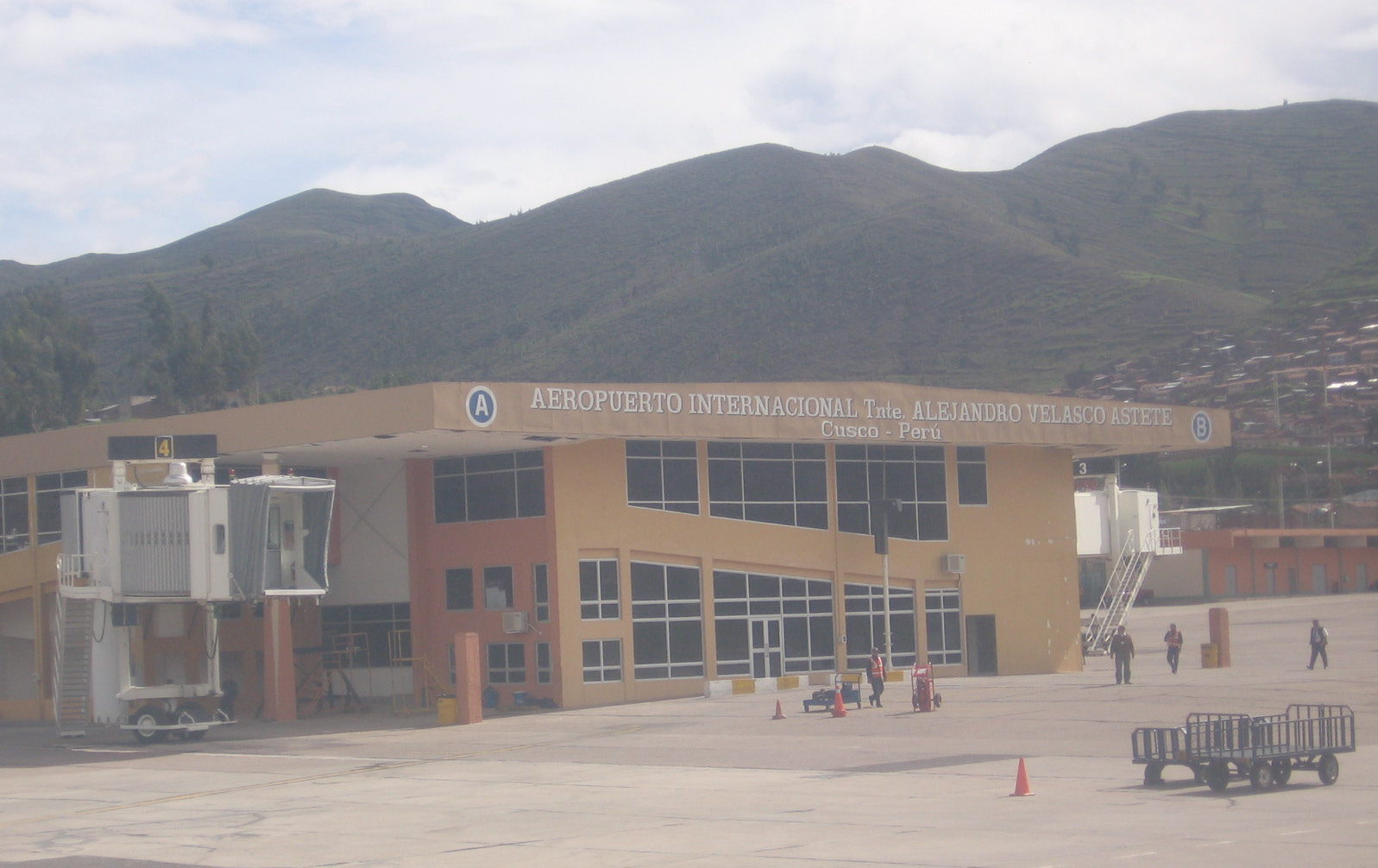
Alejandro Velasco Astete International Airport, March 2006

The airport began service in December 1964. It was served by American Airlines from New York City on a JFK–LIM–CUZ–LIM–JFK routing from 1998 to 1999 using Boeing 757-200 aircraft. However, these flights were discontinued due to a number of factors, including the airport's limited services and facilities, as well as the Peruvian government's refusal to grant passenger transportation rights between Lima and Cusco. American still holds the rights to this route and can resume flights at the company's discretion. The airport was largely controlled by airline giants Aeroperú and Faucett Perú, which would both be declared bankrupt in the late 1990s. In 1970, LANSA Flight 502 crashed after taking off from the airport and killed 99 out of the 100 on board.

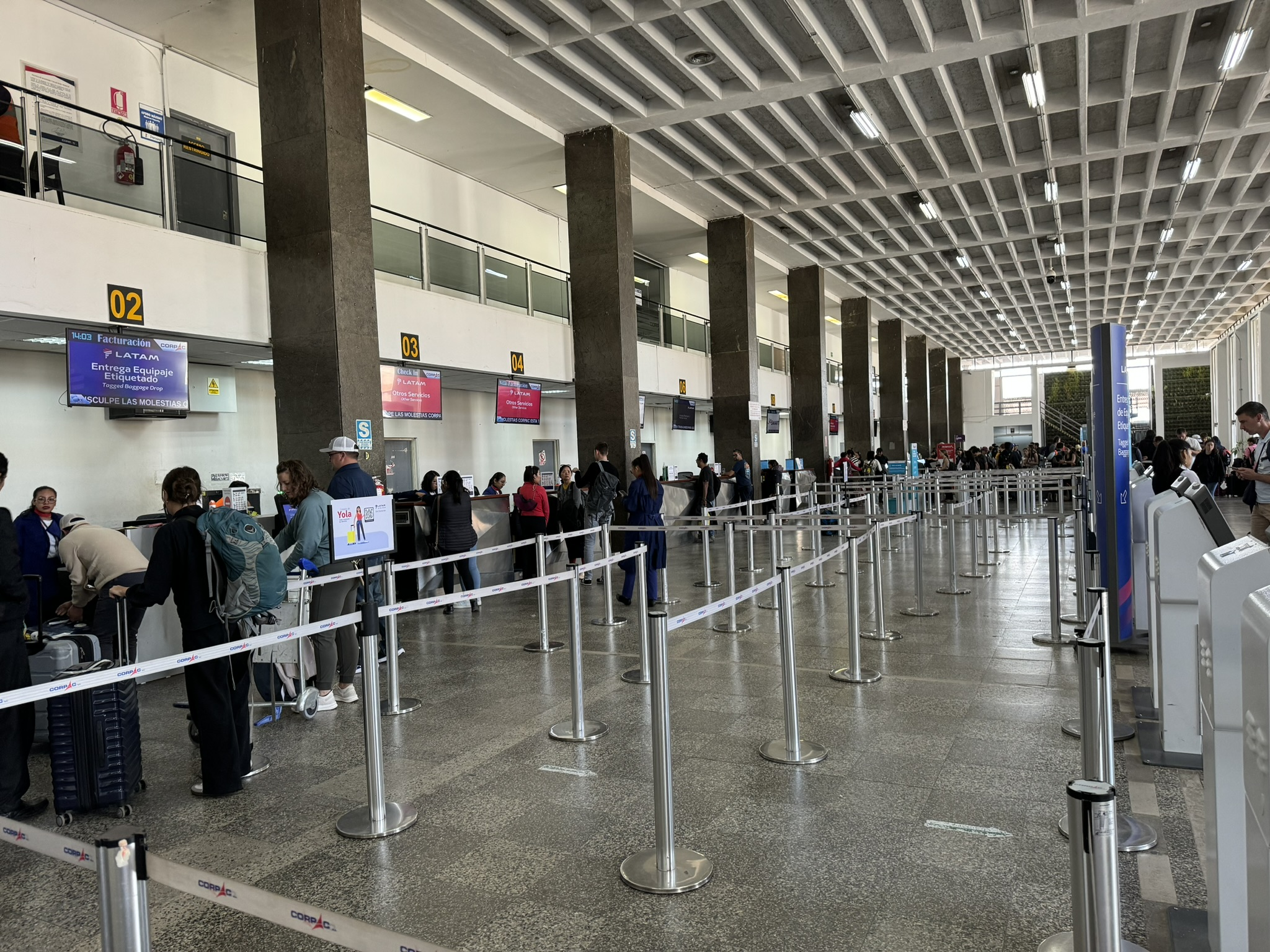
Check-in counters at the airport.

On February 3, 2017, President Kuczynski announced the beginning of the construction of the new Chinchero International Airport, which will be located in the suburb of Chinchero, 30 minutes from the city of Cusco. It is estimated that the new airport, will be completed by 2025 when Velasco Astete International Airport will be closed. It is expected to receive up to 6 million passengers upon its opening. Its main intent is to promote more tourism in Cusco and to prevent a stop in Lima's Jorge Chávez International Airport, since the current airport mostly has domestic destinations from Lima and other countries in South America. There are multiple environmental and safety concerns regarding the new airport, with numerous attempts, even by UNESCO, to stop the construction of the airport which could harm the popular Incan site Machu Picchu and other ruins. The new airport broke ground in November 2021.

In November 2025, it was announced that the airport will operate flights to Argentinian cities including Puerto Iguazú, Rosario, Mendoza, Salta, Córdoba, Tucumán and Neuquén. These destinations will be served by LATAM in 2026.

== Design ==
The airport has a number of amenities to service the multitude of tourists which visit the city of Cusco. On May 31, 2000, it became the first Peruvian airport to make use of jetways.

The runway is paved and is 3,400 meters (11,200 feet) long and 45 meters (148 feet) wide. The long length of the runway is due to the elevation of the airport. The thin/less dense air requires aircraft to use more runway length to generate wing lift. Engine power generation is reduced for the same reasons, less dense air, less thrust from the engines than at lower elevations. Climb-outs are much more slow and shallow than at lower elevation airports. Due to high terrain on 3 sides, this is a "one runway airport". Landings are only authorized from the south, onto runway 28. Takeoffs are only authorized in the reverse direction, from runway 10.

== Airlines and destinations ==
Airlines	Destinations
Avianca	Bogotá, La Paz
JetSmart Perú	Arequipa, Lima
Boliviana de Aviación	La Paz
LATAM Perú	Arequipa, Lima, Puerto Maldonado, Santiago de Chile, São Paulo–Guarulhos (begins 29 March 2027)
Sky Airline Peru	Arequipa, Lima, Puerto Maldonado, Santiago de Chile (begins 3 January 2027)

== Access ==
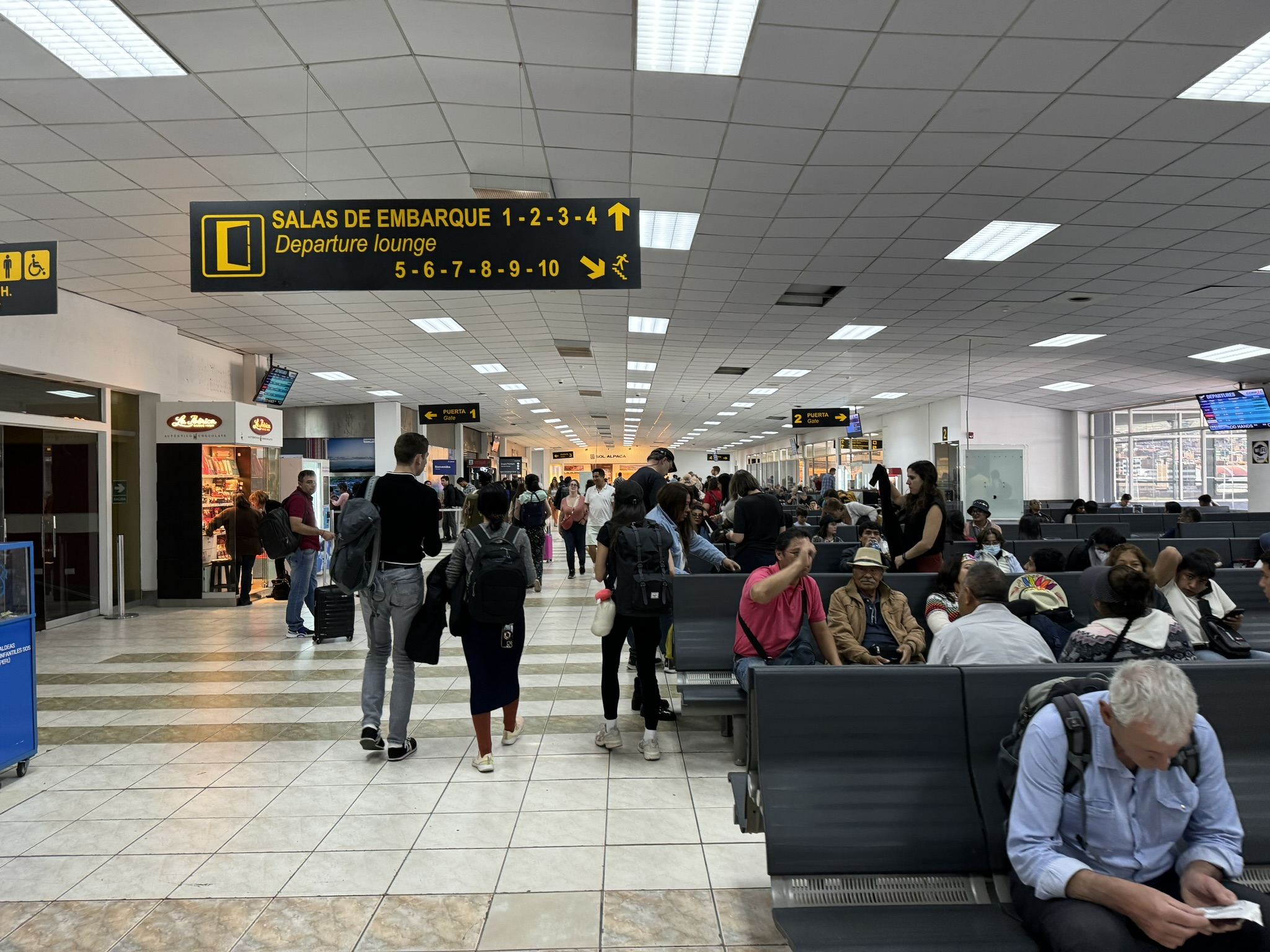
Gates at the airport.

The airport is located approximately 3.7 km from the historic center of Cusco. Passengers have various transportation options to reach the city center and other tourist destinations in the Cusco Region.

=== Taxis ===
Authorized taxi companies have service counters inside the terminal, in the arrivals area. Taxi fares vary depending on the number of passengers and luggage.

=== Airport shuttles ===
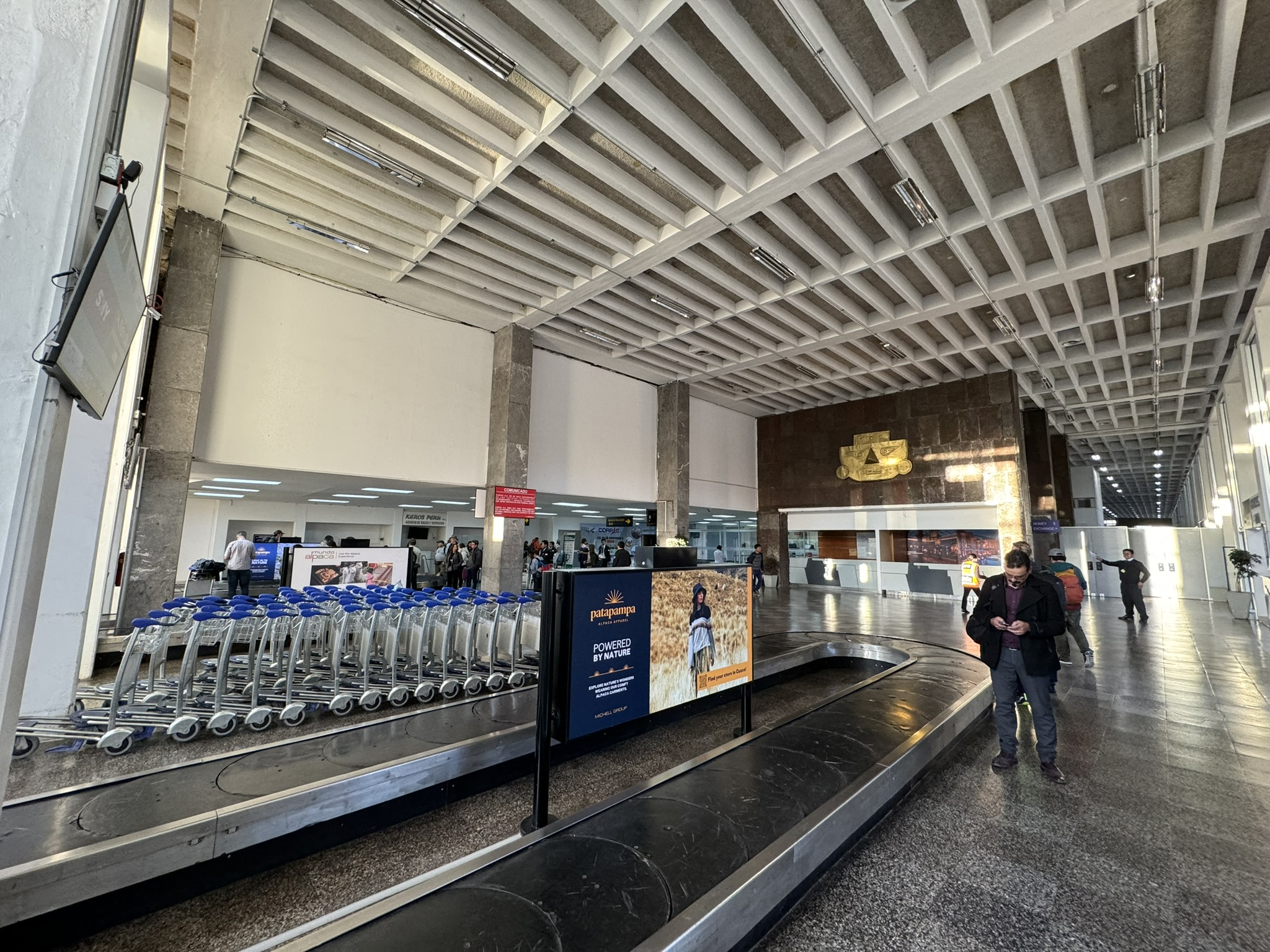
Baggage claim bands at the airport.

A number of established companies offer ground transportation including Aeroexpreso Airport Shuttle, Cusco Airport Shuttle and Cusco Shuttle. The latter two provide door-to-door transfers.

=== Car rental ===
Car rental companies such as Sixt, Thrifty, Dollar, and Hertz have offices located across from the airport's main entrance.

=== Train ===
PeruRail has a sales office inside the airport offering tickets to Machu Picchu Pueblo and Puno. However, the airport does not have a nearby train station. Passengers must take a taxi or the airport shuttle to the Wanchaq, San Pedro, or Poroy train stations to board their train.

== Accidents ==
- On August 9, 1970, LANSA Flight 502, a four-engine Lockheed L-188A Electra turboprop, crashed shortly after takeoff from Cusco Airport, killing 99 of the 100 people on board, plus two people on the ground. It was the second deadliest accident in Peru's aviation history till that time. 49 of the passengers were high school exchange students visiting Peru from Buffalo, New York. Investigation revealed the accident was caused by improper piloting technique and aircraft poor maintenance. The airline was suspended and fined by the Peruvian government. A memorial — a large white cross with a nameplate — has been erected for the victims near the crash site, about a mile and a half west-north-west from the airport.
