= Rodríguez Ballón International Airport =

Airport in Peru

Rodríguez Ballón International Airport Aeropuerto Internacional Rodríguez Ballón
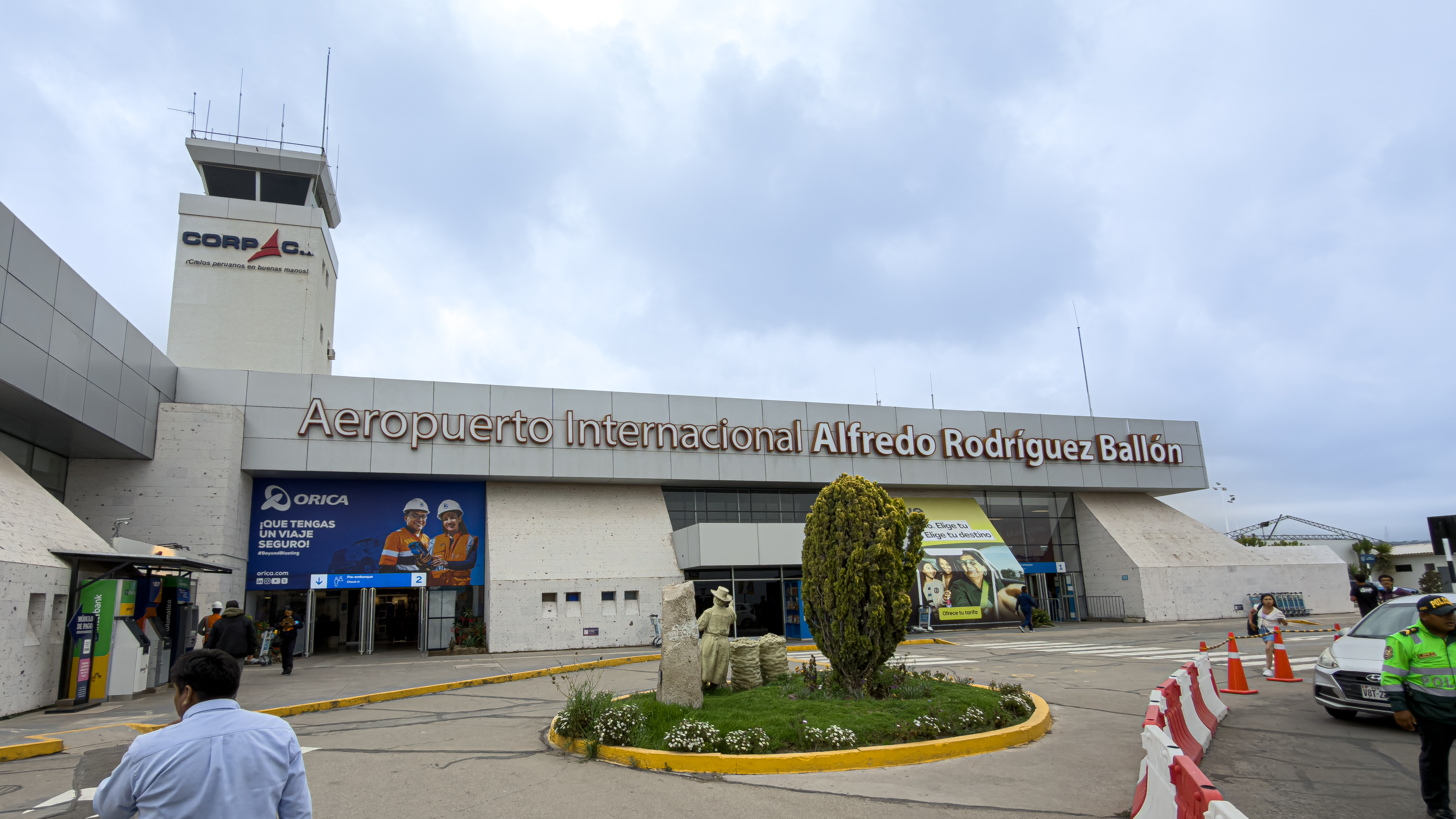
- Rodríguez Ballón International Airport in 2026
- IATA: AQP; ICAO: SPQU

Summary
- Airport type: Public
- Owner: CORPAC
- Operator: Aeropuertos Andinos del Perú
- Serves: Arequipa
- Opened: 15 August 1979; 47 years ago
- Hub for: JetSmart Perú
- Focus city for: LATAM Perú
- Elevation AMSL: 8,400 ft (2,600 m)
- Coordinates: 16°20′25″S 71°34′00″W

Map
- Location of the airport in Peru

Runways
Direction	Length		Surface
Direction	m	ft	Surface
09/27	2,980	9,777	Asphalt

Statistics (2023)
- Passengers: 1,980,498
- Source: Corporación Peruana de Aeropuertos y Aviación Comercial

Rodríguez Ballón International Airport (Spanish: Aeropuerto Internacional Rodríguez Ballón, IATA: AQP, ICAO: SPQU) is an airport serving Arequipa, the capital of Arequipa Region and Peru's second largest city. This airport and Cusco's Alejandro Velasco Astete International Airport are the main air hubs in southern Peru. It is named for early Peruvian aviator Alfredo Rodríguez Ballón. It is the third busiest airport in Peru.

It is the main air gateway of Arequipa, nearby ruins, and the Colca Canyon, the world's second deepest canyon (only behind Cotahuasi Canyon, also in Arequipa). The airport's passenger traffic has grown very rapidly since the airport was granted in concession as part of 6 airports in the southern part of Peru to Aeropuertos Andinos del Perú. As of the end of 2017 passenger traffic was 1,689,921 as reported by CORPAC, Peru's national airport corporation. The current terminal has already exceeded its planned capacity (around 1.5 million passengers) and it is expected that the airport will reach 2 million passengers on or before the year 2020 and is to be expanded.

The runway is paved its entire length, which includes a 440 metres (1,440 ft) displaced threshold on Runway 28. The airport is currently operated by the consortium "Aeropuertos Andinos", who reshuffled and modernized the existing facilities. The installation of two boarding jetbridges and the expansion of the main hall, are among the work carried out by the consortium. The hall and the first jetbridge entered in operation on 20 September 2013. It's the secondary base for JetSmart Perú.

== History ==
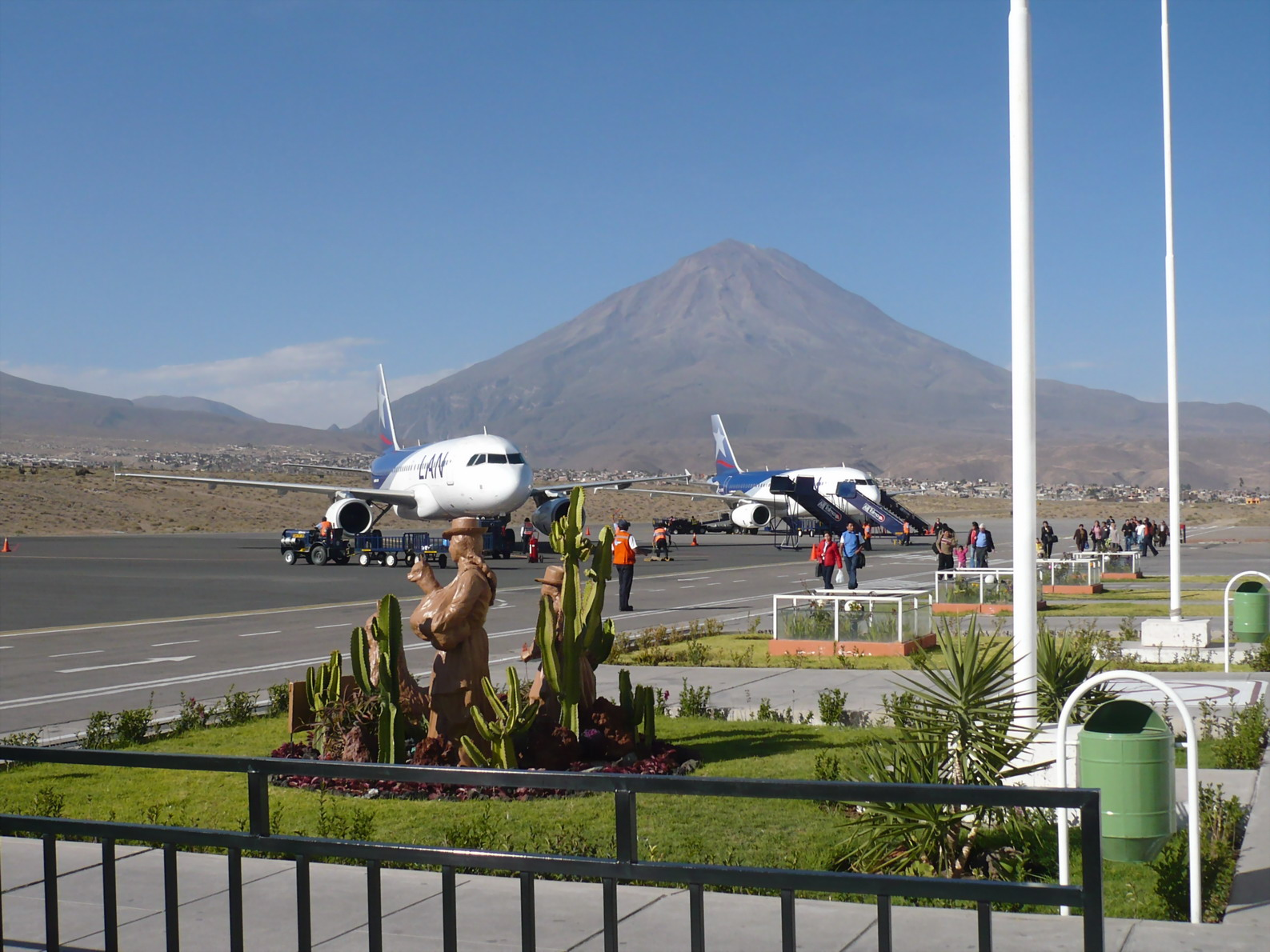
Former LAN Perú Airbus A320 at the airport

Rodríguez Ballón International Airport was opened in August 1979 and named after Peruvian aviator, Alfredo Rodríguez Ballón, who is famous in Arequipa for crossing the Andes Mountains from Mendoza, Argentina to Santiago in Chile in 1932. He would later be killed in a plane crash during the Colombia–Peru War. The airport quickly became one of the largest and busiest airports in Peru, even surpassing Cusco's Alejandro Velasco Astete International Airport for a few years. It was built with a maximum capacity for 500,000 passengers. It is owned by CORPAC S.A (Corporación Peruana de Aeropuertos y Aviación Comercial S.A.), the Peruvian Corporation of Commercial Airports and Aviation, the largest airport corporation in Peru.

Large airlines such as former flag carrier Aeroperú, Faucett Perú and Nuevo Continente dominated the airport, having international destinations to Bolivia and Chile along with many other airports in Peru but were all declared bankrupt in the 1990s and 2000s, with foreign owned airlines such as LATAM Airlines Perú taking control of the market. In March 1983, a Douglas C-47 of the Peruvian Air Force arrived at the airport damaged after an accident. In 1996, Faucett Perú Flight 251 was approaching Arequipa from Lima on its way to Coronel FAP Carlos Ciriani Santa Rosa International Airport in Tacna. Unable to see the runway midst a thunderstorm. The aircraft crashed when it attempted to land, killing all 123 people on board. It is considered the deadliest Peruvian aviation accident in history.

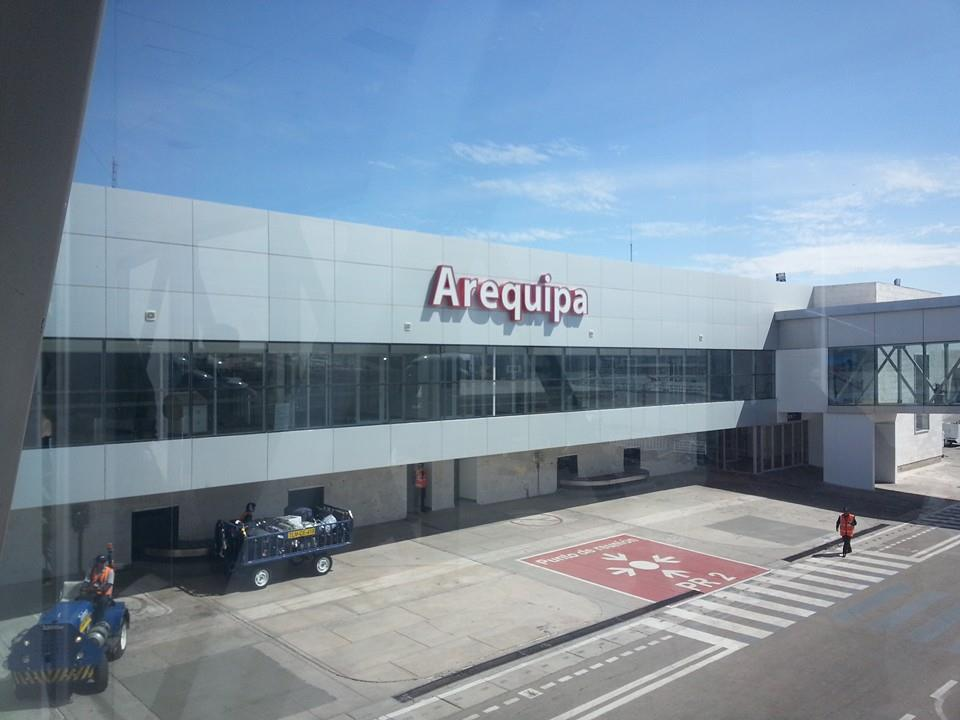
Jetbridges of the airport

The airport was given in concession to Aeropuertos Andinos del Perú (AAP) for 25 years in 2011, even at that time the main terminal was operating at more than twice its planned capacity, the infrastructure was obsolete and neglected, part of the concession agreement required the airport operator to upgrade and expand the facilities. Over one million passengers flew through the airport which prompted the airport to be expanded and remodeled. In 2013, construction of two jet bridge's, expansion of the terminal and a new modern exterior work began and was completed that same year. By then, passenger traffic at the airport was growing by 11% and the airport was in need of another expansion.

In 2023, Aeropuertos Andinos del Perú (AAP) announced another expansion and modernization of the airport with a planned investment of $26 million. The new expanded terminal is set to have a capacity of 2 million passengers every year. The airports expansion plan was accepted in 2024 and construction is planned to begin that same year. The new terminal is set to be completed in January 2026 and allow access to other countries such as Argentina, Bolivia and Chile. However, numerous delays halted the expansion, with construction being planned to begin in 2027.

== Airlines and destinations ==
Airlines	Destinations
JetSmart Perú	Cusco, Lima
LATAM Perú	Cusco, Lima
Sky Airline Peru	Cusco, Lima

== Passenger traffic information ==
Year	2019	2018	2017	2016	2015	2014	2013	2012	2011	2010
Passenger Traffic	1,990,820	1,921,316	1,689,921	1,634,090	1,492,423	1,351,182	1,282,504	1,148,438	1,025,476	939,397
YoY% Growth	3.62%	13.75%	3.42%	9.5%	10.45%	5.35%	11.67%	11.99%	9.16%	N/A

== Accidents and incidents ==
- On 18 March 1983, Douglas C-47E FAP-356 of the Fuerza Aérea del Perú was damaged beyond repair in an accident at Arequipa Airport.
- On 29 February 1996, Faucett Perú Flight 251 was flying a stopover in Arequipa to Tacna and crashed while approaching the airport. All 123 passengers and crew died. It is the deadliest Peruvian aviation accident.

== See also ==
- Transport in Peru
- List of airports in Peru
