= Aeroperú =

National airline of Peru (1973–1999)

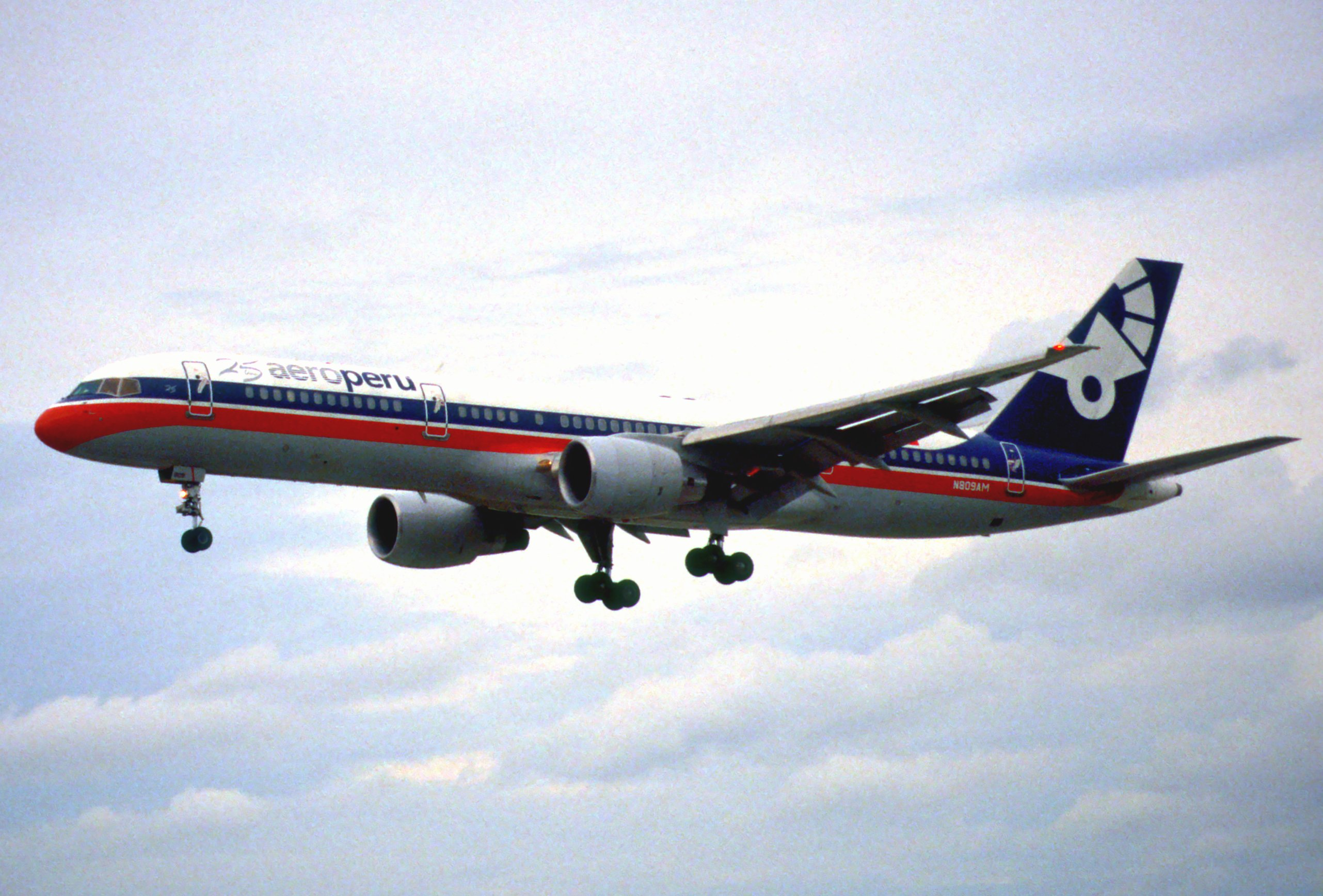
- Aeroperú Boeing 757 in 1998
IATA	ICAO	Call sign
PL	PLI	AEROPERÚ
- Founded: May 22, 1973
- Commenced operations: October 3, 1973
- Ceased operations: August 18, 1999
- Hubs: Jorge Chávez International Airport
- Focus cities: El Dorado International Airport (late 1990s)
- Frequent-flyer program: Club Premier
- Fleet size: 22 (at time of closure)
- Destinations: 34 (at time of closure)
- Parent company: Aeroméxico
- Headquarters: Lima, Peru
- Employees: 1,500
- Website: aeroperu.com.pe

Empresa de Transporte Aéreo del Perú S.A. branded as Aeroperú, was a Peruvian airline, serving as flag carrier of Peru from 1973 to 1999. The company was headquartered in Lima, with the city's Jorge Chávez International Airport serving as its primary hub. Besides an extensive domestic route network, Aeroperú offered international flights to destinations in Latin America and the United States of America. The company had around 1,500 employees. It ceased operations in 1999, with LAN Perú being its successor as flag carrier.

== History ==
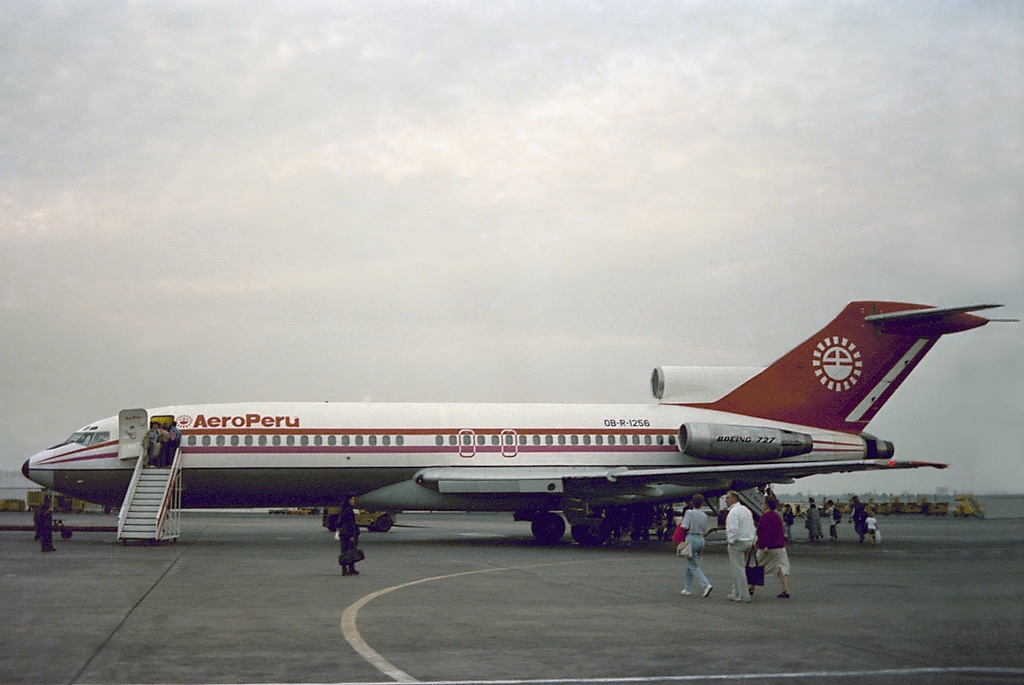
A Boeing 727-100 at Jorge Chavez International Airport in 1988

Aeroperú was formed on May 22, 1973, following the reorganization of SATCO, an earlier airline founded on 1960 and controlled by the Peruvian Army. Initially, a wholly state-owned company with a fleet of three Fokker F28 Fellowships taken over from SATCO, commercial flights were commenced in October on the Lima-Cusco route. Soon, a Boeing 727 joined the fleet, and the airline placed an order for two new Fokker F27 Friendships. In 1974, two Douglas DC-8s were acquired from Viasa, which allowed the company to launch international flights.

The inaugural international flight to Buenos Aires took place on 29 July 1974, soon followed by a scheduled service to Miami. By 1978, the Aeroperú network had grown to include many Latin American destinations, and also the US cities of New York and Los Angeles due to their large Latino populations.

In July 1981, Aeroperú was gradually privatized, with the Peruvian government keeping a 20% minority share. In 1982, plans were made for a merger with Faucett Perú, the other large Peruvian passenger airline at that time. As a preparatory measure, redundancies in the route networks of the two airlines were eliminated, to which end Aeroperú suspended flights to a number of destinations, including Rio de Janeiro, São Paulo, New York City and Los Angeles. No further steps were taken towards merging the two airlines, and so in 1983 flights to several destinations recommenced. A bilateral air traffic agreement between Peru and the United States expired on 11 November 1983. Because of disagreements over the granting of fifth freedom rights, all flights between the two countries were suspended in May 1984 until mid-1985, which affected Aeroperú's Lima-Miami route. In 1993, Aeroméxico acquired 70% of the shares worth $54 million, thus making Aeroperú its subsidiary. Subsequently, two Boeing 757-200s were transferred, allowing Aeroperú to replace their ageing DC-8s. In 1996, 47% of Aeroperú was transferred to Cintra, the parent company of Aeroméxico and Mexicana de Aviación. In 1998, Delta Air Lines became a major shareholder of Aeroperú, when they acquired a 35% stake in the airline. The agreement saw Cintra reducing their share to an equal 35%.

Aeroperú was forced to suspend all flight operations on March 10, 1999. According to general director Jaan Albrecht, Aeroperu's debt by 1999 had reached $174 million, while the airline's tangible assets were worth only $50 million. Several plans for a relaunch were made, which included a possible buy-in of Continental Airlines or a takeover by a group of foreign investors. None of these materialized, and Aeroperú was liquidated on August 18, 1999. One final attempt at reviving the airline failed in mid-December 1999 after the airline's creditors rejected the proposal. Most of its route network as well as the role of Peruvian flag carrier was taken over by newly founded LAN Perú.

== Destinations ==
With Jorge Chavez International Airport being its most important hub, Aeroperú maintained an extensive domestic route network. International flights were offered to a number of cities in Latin America, as well as the United States.

== Fleet ==
Over the years, Aeroperú operated the following aircraft types:

Aeroperú fleet
Aircraft	Total	Introduced	Retired	Notes
Boeing 727-100	8	1974	1998	
Boeing 727-200	9	1993	1999	
Boeing 737-200	4	1998	1999	
Boeing 757-200	4	1994	1999	One Destroyed In Flight 603
Boeing 767-200	1	1990	1990	Leased from Britannia Airways
Douglas C-47 Skytrain	3	1973	Unknown	
Douglas DC-8-43	1	1978	1978	Leased from Air Jamaica
Douglas DC-8-51	3	1976	1981	Leased from Air Jamaica
Douglas DC-8-53	3	1974	1976	
Douglas DC-8-61	1	1992	1994	
Douglas DC-8-62H	5	1988	1994	
Douglas DC-8-63	1	1990	1992	
Fokker F-27 Friendship	3	1974	1984	
Fokker F-28 Fellowship	4	1973	1998	
McDonnell Douglas DC-10-15	3	1993	1997	Leased from Mexicana de Aviación
McDonnell Douglas DC-10-30	1	1994	1995	Leased from Canadian Airlines
Lockheed L-1011 Tristar	2	1978	1982	Leased from Lockheed Corporation
Lockheed L-1011 Tristar	1	1991	1992	Jointly operated by Faucett Perú

== Accidents and incidents ==
- On October 25, 1988, in Aeroperú Flight 772, a Fokker F28 Fellowship (registered OB-R-1020) took off at Inca Manco Cápac International Airport for a domestic flight to Arequipa, but failed to obtain any substantial height. Subsequently, the aircraft hit the ground and broke up. 11 of the 65 passengers on board were killed, as well as one crew member.

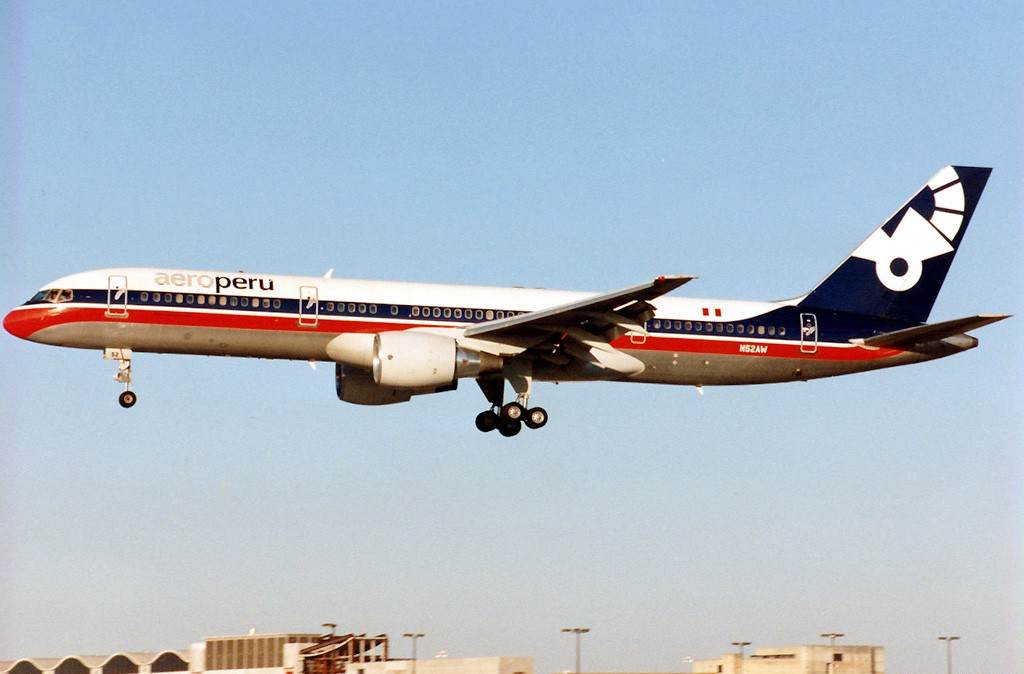
The Boeing 757-200 destroyed in the crash of Flight 603 into the Pacific Ocean.

- On October 2, 1996, at 01:11 local time, Aeroperú Flight 603, a Boeing 757-200 (registered N52AW) was en route from Lima to Santiago de Chile and crashed into the Pacific Ocean. All 70 people on board died in the crash. Investigators revealed that during earlier maintenance work, a protective tape covering the static ports of the airplane had not been removed, which resulted in critical readings blocked to the pilots during the accident flight. It was the deadliest accident of Aeroperu.

== See also ==
- List of defunct airlines of Peru
