= Coronel FAP Carlos Ciriani Santa Rosa International Airport =

Crnl. FAP Carlos Ciriani Santa Rosa International Airport
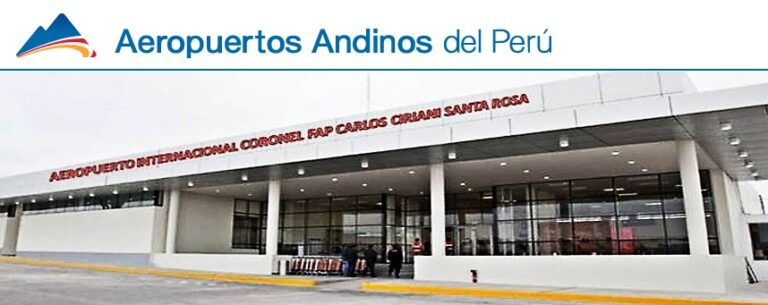
- IATA: TCQ; ICAO: SPTN

Summary
- Airport type: Public
- Operator: CORPAC S.A.
- Location: Tacna, Peru
- Elevation AMSL: 1,538 ft (469 m)
- Coordinates: 18°03′05″S 70°16′30″W

Map
- Location of the airport in Peru

Runways
Direction	Length		Surface
Direction	m	ft	Surface
02/20	2,500	8,202	Asphalt
- Sources: GCM

Coronel FAP Carlos Ciriani Santa Rosa International Airport (IATA: TCQ, ICAO: SPTN) is an airport serving Tacna, Peru. It is run by CORPAC S.A. (Corporación Peruana de Aeropuertos y Aviación Comercial S.A.), a government organization that oversees airport management. This is the main airport of the Tacna Region, and is 27 km (17 mi) north of Peru's border with Chile.

== Airlines and destinations ==
Airlines	Destinations
Sky Airline Peru	Lima

== Incidents ==
- On 19 March 2000 an Aviandina Boeing 727-100 (reg. OB-1731) on a scheduled passenger flight from Arequipa to Juliaca deviated to Tacna Airport after suffering an in-flight landing gear failure that forced the crew to divert to Tacna, where the plane landed with its right main landing gear retracted after the pilots flew for over an hour on a holding pattern to burn all aircraft's fuel before the emergency landing.

== See also ==
- Transport in Peru
- List of airports in Peru
