= List of Aeroperú destinations =

This list includes domestic and international destinations once served by Aeroperú, the former flag carrier airline of Peru from 1973 to 1999. Besides a multitude of domestic routes, the network with its hub at Lima's Jorge Chavez International Airport spanned throughout Latin America. At times, cities in the United States were served, too, as well as regional routes out of El Dorado International Airport in Colombia.

City	Country	Airport	Commenced	Ceased	Notes
Buenos Aires	Argentina	Ministro Pistarini International Airport	1974	1999	First international route
Cochabamba	Bolivia	Jorge Wilstermann International Airport	1996	1997	
La Paz	Bolivia	El Alto International Airport	1978	1999	
Santa Cruz de la Sierra	Bolivia	Viru Viru International Airport	1994	1997	
Rio de Janeiro	Brazil	Rio de Janeiro/Galeão International Airport	1975	1997	Suspended during 1982
São Paulo	Brazil	Viracopos International Airport; Guarulhos International Airport	1975	1999	Suspended during 1982
Santiago	Chile	Arturo Merino Benítez International Airport	1975	1999	
Bogotá	Colombia	El Dorado International Airport	1978; 1994	1991; 1999	Focus city
Bucaramanga	Colombia	Palonegro International Airport	1978; 1996	1991; 1997	
Cali	Colombia	Alfonso Bonilla Aragón International Airport	1996	1997	
Saravena	Colombia	Los Colonizadores Airport	1996	1997	
Guayaquil	Ecuador	Simón Bolívar International Airport	1975; 1998	1994; 1999	
Quito	Ecuador	Old Mariscal Sucre International Airport	1978; 1993	1981; 1999	
Guatemala City	Guatemala	La Aurora International Airport	1996	1997	
Cancún	Mexico	Cancún International Airport	1998	1999	
Mexico City	Mexico	Mexico City International Airport	1975	1999	
Panama City	Panama	Tocumen International Airport	1978	1999	Suspended during 1982
Asunción	Paraguay	Silvio Pettirossi International Airport	1978; 1994	1981; 1997	
Andahuaylas	Peru	Andahuaylas Airport	ca. 1974	1992	
Arequipa	Peru	Rodríguez Ballón International Airport	1973	1999	
Ayacucho	Peru	Coronel FAP Alfredo Mendívil Duarte Airport	ca. 1974	1993	
Cajamarca	Peru	Mayor General FAP Armando Revoredo Iglesias Airport	ca. 1974	1981	
Chiclayo	Peru	FAP Captain José Abelardo Quiñones González International Airport	1973	1999	Suspended during the mid-1990s
Chimbote	Peru	Tnte. FAP Jaime Montreuil Morales Airport	ca. 1974	1981	
Cusco	Peru	Alejandro Velasco Astete International Airport	1973	1999	Inaugural destination
Huánuco	Peru	Alférez FAP David Figueroa Fernandini Airport	ca. 1974	1991	
Huaraz	Peru	Comandante FAP Germán Arias Graziani Airport	ca. 1974	1981	
Iquitos	Peru	Coronel FAP Francisco Secada Vignetta International Airport	1973	1999	
Jauja	Peru	Francisco Carle Airport	1976	1977	
Juanjuí	Peru	Juanjuí Airport	ca. 1974	1992	
Juliaca	Peru	Inca Manco Cápac International Airport	1973	1999	
Lima	Peru	Jorge Chavez International Airport	1973	1999	Hub
Moyobamba	Peru	Moyobamba Airport	ca. 1974	1992	
Piura	Peru	FAP Captain Guillermo Concha Iberico International Airport	1973	1999	
Pucallpa	Peru	FAP Captain David Abensur Rengifo International Airport	ca. 1974	1992	
Puerto Maldonado	Peru	Padre Aldamiz International Airport	1976	1994	
Rioja	Peru	Juan Simons Vela Airport	ca. 1974	1981	
Tacna	Peru	Coronel FAP Carlos Ciriani Santa Rosa International Airport	ca. 1974	1992	
Talara	Peru	Cap. FAP Víctor Montes Arias Airport	ca. 1974	1994	
Tarapoto	Peru	Cad. FAP Guillermo del Castillo Paredes Airport	ca. 1974	1992	
Tingo María	Peru	Tingo María Airport	ca. 1974	1991	
Trujillo	Peru	Capitán FAP Carlos Martínez de Pinillos International Airport	1973	1999	
Tumbes	Peru	Cap. FAP Pedro Canga Rodríguez Airport	ca. 1974	1992	
Yurimaguas	Peru	Moisés Benzaquén Rengifo Airport	ca. 1974	1992	
Los Angeles	United States	Los Angeles International Airport	1975	1981	Short-lived relaunch during 1998
Miami	United States	Miami International Airport	1974	1998	Suspended between 1984 and 1985
New York City	United States	John F. Kennedy International Airport	1977	1981	Short-lived relaunch during 1998
Caracas	Venezuela	Simón Bolívar International Airport	1977	1991	Several short-lived relaunch attempts during the 1990s
Maracaibo	Venezuela	La Chinita International Airport	1996	1997	
