= List of the busiest airports in Peru =

The following is a list of the busiest airports in Peru. The airports are ranked by passenger traffic and aircraft movements. For each airport, the lists cite the city served by the airport, not necessarily the municipality where the airport is physically located.

== 2025 ==
=== Peru's 15 busiest airports by passenger traffic(JAN-SEP) ===
Rank	Airport	Serves	Total passengers	Annual change^{A}	Rank change
1	Jorge Chávez International Airport	Lima metropolitan area	20'502,102	▲6.33%	Steady
2	Alejandro Velasco Astete International Airport	Cusco	3'629,646	▲18.07%	Steady
3	Rodríguez Ballón International Airport	Arequipa metropolitan area	1'771,529	▲3.85%	Steady
4	Cad. FAP Guillermo del Castillo Paredes Airport	Tarapoto	893,592	▲4.92%	Steady
5	FAP Captain Guillermo Concha Iberico International Airport	Piura metropolitan area	787,077	▼-2.11%	Steady
6	Coronel FAP Francisco Secada Vignetta International Airport	Iquitos metropolitan area	783,490	▲2.85%	Steady
7	FAP Captain José Abelardo Quiñones González International Airport	Chiclayo metropolitan area	733,579	▲6.57%	▲1
6	FAP Captain Carlos Martínez de Pinillos International Airport	Trujillo metropolitan area	709,405	▲1.39%	▼1
9	FAP Captain David Abensur Rengifo International Airport	Pucallpa	515,669	▼-0.65%	Steady
10	Mayor General FAP Armando Revoredo Iglesias Airport	Cajamarca	501,996	▲-3.98%	Steady
11	Inca Manco Cápac International Airport	Juliaca	498,558	▲16.62%	Steady
12	Padre Aldamiz International Airport	Puerto Maldonado	415,670	▲54.23%	▲3
13	Coronel FAP Carlos Ciriani Santa Rosa International Airport	Tacna	411,593	▲22.80%	▲1
14	Coronel FAP Alfredo Mendívil Duarte Airport	Ayacucho	359,182	▲24.52%	Steady
15	FAP Captain Pedro Canga Rodríguez Airport	Tumbes	315,900	▼-4.88%	▼3
16	Capitán FAP Víctor Montes Arias International Airport	Talara	196,632	▼-1.99%	Steady
-	[All Airports]	Peru	33'452,296	▲6.84%	Steady

== 2024 ==
=== Peru's 15 busiest airports by passenger traffic ===
Rank	Airport	Serves	Total passengers	Annual change^{A}	Rank change
1	Jorge Chávez International Airport	Lima metropolitan area	26'085,552	▲14.03%	Steady
2	Alejandro Velasco Astete International Airport	Cusco	4'069,224	▲35.44%	Steady
3	Rodríguez Ballón International Airport	Arequipa metropolitan area	2'320,544	▲17.17%	Steady
4	Cad. FAP Guillermo del Castillo Paredes Airport	Tarapoto	1'170,771	▲11.22%	▲1
5	FAP Captain Guillermo Concha Iberico International Airport	Piura metropolitan area	1'082,610	▲0.62%	▼1
6	Coronel FAP Francisco Secada Vignetta International Airport	Iquitos metropolitan area	1'026,199	▲2.65%	Steady
7	FAP Captain Carlos Martínez de Pinillos International Airport	Trujillo metropolitan area	1'023,658	▲12.92%	Steady
8	FAP Captain José Abelardo Quiñones González International Airport	Chiclayo metropolitan area	920,615	▲4.86%	Steady
9	FAP Captain David Abensur Rengifo International Airport	Pucallpa	699,626	▲4.34%	Steady
10	Mayor General FAP Armando Revoredo Iglesias Airport	Cajamarca	671,667	▲3.92%	Steady
11	Inca Manco Cápac International Airport	Juliaca	596,445	▲70.83%	▲3
12	FAP Captain Pedro Canga Rodríguez Airport	Tumbes	442,065	▲7.35%	Steady
13	Coronel FAP Carlos Ciriani Santa Rosa International Airport	Tacna	440,015	▼-20.13%	▼2
14	Coronel FAP Alfredo Mendívil Duarte Airport	Ayacucho	404,780	▲15.33%	Steady
15	Padre Aldamiz International Airport	Puerto Maldonado	376,974	▲17.08%	▲1
16	Capitán FAP Víctor Montes Arias International Airport	Talara	260,566	▼-22.60%	▼1
-	[All Airports]	Peru	42'261,101	▲14.00%	Steady

== 2023 ==
=== Peru's 15 busiest airports by passenger traffic ===
Rank	Airport	Serves	Total passengers	Annual change^{A}	Rank change
1	Jorge Chávez International Airport	Lima metropolitan area	22'876,785	▲16.84%	Steady
2	Alejandro Velasco Astete International Airport	Cusco	3'004,412	▲5.13%	Steady
3	Rodríguez Ballón International Airport	Arequipa metropolitan area	1'980,498	▲17.07%	Steady
4	FAP Captain Guillermo Concha Iberico International Airport	Piura metropolitan area	1'075,905	▲8.48%	Steady
5	Cad. FAP Guillermo del Castillo Paredes Airport	Tarapoto	1'060,739	▲17.62%	▲1
6	Coronel FAP Francisco Secada Vignetta International Airport	Iquitos metropolitan area	988.570	▲3.32%	▼1
7	FAP Captain Carlos Martínez de Pinillos International Airport	Trujillo metropolitan area	953,612	▲33.83%	Steady
8	FAP Captain José Abelardo Quiñones González International Airport	Chiclayo metropolitan area	877,938	▲45.82%	▲1
9	FAP Captain David Abensur Rengifo International Airport	Pucallpa	670,516	▲6.32%	▼1
10	Mayor General FAP Armando Revoredo Iglesias Airport	Cajamarca	646,301	▲36.48%	▲1
11	Coronel FAP Carlos Ciriani Santa Rosa International Airport	Tacna	550,894	▲42.33%	▲2
12	FAP Captain Pedro Canga Rodríguez Airport	Tumbes	411,784	▲2.60%	Steady
13	Coronel FAP Alfredo Mendívil Duarte Airport	Ayacucho	350,972	▲12.44%	▲1
14	Inca Manco Cápac International Airport	Juliaca	349,153	▼-27.71%	▼4
15	Capitán FAP Víctor Montes Arias International Airport	Talara	336,619	▲13.12%	▲1
16	Padre Aldamiz International Airport	Puerto Maldonado	321,991	▲3.70%	▼1

== 2022 ==
=== Peru's 15 busiest airports by passenger traffic ===
Rank	Airport	Serves	Total passengers	Annual change^{A}	Rank change
1	Jorge Chávez International Airport	Lima metropolitan area	19'579,837	▲74.57%	Steady
2	Alejandro Velasco Astete International Airport	Cusco	2'857,820	▲91.89%	Steady
3	Rodríguez Ballón International Airport	Arequipa metropolitan area	1'691,716	▲84.22%	Steady
4	FAP Captain Guillermo Concha Iberico International Airport	Piura metropolitan area	991,786	▲53.83%	▲2
5	Coronel FAP Francisco Secada Vignetta International Airport	Iquitos metropolitan area	960,807	▲23.01%	▼1
6	Cad. FAP Guillermo del Castillo Paredes Airport	Tarapoto	901,806	▲39.14%	▼1
7	FAP Captain Carlos Martínez de Pinillos International Airport	Trujillo metropolitan area	759,526	▲95.27%	▲1
8	FAP Captain David Abensur Rengifo International Airport	Pucallpa	630,684	▲24.21%	▼1
9	FAP Captain José Abelardo Quiñones González International Airport	Chiclayo metropolitan area	602,069	▲47.44%	Steady
10	Inca Manco Cápac International Airport	Juliaca	482,971	▲27.06%	Steady
11	Mayor General FAP Armando Revoredo Iglesias Airport	Cajamarca	473,567	▲59.61%	▲1
12	FAP Captain Pedro Canga Rodríguez Airport	Tumbes	401,336	▲33.41%	▼1
13	Coronel FAP Carlos Ciriani Santa Rosa International Airport	Tacna	387,045	▲44.78%	Steady
14	Coronel FAP Alfredo Mendívil Duarte Airport	Ayacucho	312,128	▲72.00%	▲2
15	Padre Aldamiz International Airport	Puerto Maldonado	310,488	▲61.34%	Steady

== 2021 ==
=== Peru's 15 busiest airports by passenger traffic ===
Rank	Airport	Serves	Total passengers	Annual change^{A}	Rank change
1	Jorge Chávez International Airport	Lima metropolitan area	11'215,760	▲48.23%	Steady
2	Alejandro Velasco Astete International Airport	Cusco	1'489,281	▲46.93%	Steady
3	Rodríguez Ballón International Airport	Arequipa metropolitan area	918,314	▲64.83%	Steady
4	Coronel FAP Francisco Secada Vignetta International Airport	Iquitos metropolitan area	781,413	▲47.45%	Steady
5	Cad. FAP Guillermo del Castillo Paredes Airport	Tarapoto	648,111	▲81.94%	▲1
6	FAP Captain Guillermo Concha Iberico International Airport	Piura metropolitan area	644,709	▲56.21%	▼1
7	FAP Captain David Abensur Rengifo International Airport	Pucallpa	507,737	▲63.35%	Steady
8	FAP Captain Carlos Martínez de Pinillos International Airport	Trujillo metropolitan area	416,998	▲96.01%	▲1
9	FAP Captain José Abelardo Quiñones González International Airport	Chiclayo metropolitan area	408,341	▲46.86%	▼1
10	Inca Manco Cápac International Airport	Juliaca	380,105	▲108.75%	Steady
11	FAP Captain Pedro Canga Rodríguez Airport	Tumbes	300,840	▲94.18%	▲3
12	Mayor General FAP Armando Revoredo Iglesias Airport	Cajamarca	296,698	▲76.50%	▼1
13	Coronel FAP Carlos Ciriani Santa Rosa International Airport	Tacna	267,334	▲68.54%	▼1
14	Capitán FAP Víctor Montes Arias International Airport	Talara	230,087	▲46.10%	▼1
15	Padre Aldamiz International Airport	Puerto Maldonado	192,440	▲84.11%	Steady

== 2020 ==
=== Peru's 15 busiest airports by passenger traffic ===
Rank	Airport	Serves	Total passengers	Annual change^{A}	Rank change
1	Jorge Chávez International Airport	Lima metropolitan area	7,566,704	▼70.21%	Steady
2	Alejandro Velasco Astete International Airport	Cusco	1,013,631	▼74.05%	Steady
3	Rodríguez Ballón International Airport	Arequipa metropolitan area	557,125	▼72.02%	Steady
4	Coronel FAP Francisco Secada Vignetta International Airport	Iquitos metropolitan area	530,632	▼54.56%	Steady
5	FAP Captain Guillermo Concha Iberico International Airport	Piura metropolitan area	413,030	▼63.50%	Steady
6	Cad. FAP Guillermo del Castillo Paredes Airport	Tarapoto	356,213	▼60.65%	Steady
7	FAP Captain David Abensur Rengifo International Airport	Pucallpa	310,830	▼56.34%	Steady
8	FAP Captain José Abelardo Quiñones González International Airport	Chiclayo metropolitan area	278,040	▼59.03%	Steady
9	FAP Captain Carlos Martínez de Pinillos International Airport	Trujillo metropolitan area	231,216	▼64.35%	Steady
10	Inca Manco Cápac International Airport	Juliaca	182,088	▼60.52%	▲1
11	Mayor General FAP Armando Revoredo Iglesias Airport	Cajamarca	168,097	▼63.62%	▲1
12	Coronel FAP Carlos Ciriani Santa Rosa International Airport	Tacna	158,618	▼66.87%	▼2
13	Capitán FAP Víctor Montes Arias International Airport	Talara	157,489	▼50.63%	▲1
14	FAP Captain Pedro Canga Rodríguez Airport	Tumbes	154,929	▼39.38%	New entry
15	Padre Aldamiz International Airport	Puerto Maldonado	104,523	▼68.96%	▼2

== 2019 ==
=== Peru's 15 busiest airports by passenger traffic ===
Rank	Airport	Serves	Total passengers^{A}	Annual change^{A}	Rank change
1	Jorge Chávez International Airport	Lima Metropolitan Area	25'424,260	▲7.46%	Steady
2	Alejandro Velasco Astete International Airport	Cusco	3'906,169	▲3.80%	Steady
3	Rodríguez Ballón International Airport	Arequipa metropolitan area	1'990,820	▲3.62%	Steady
4	Coronel FAP Francisco Secada Vignetta International Airport	Iquitos metropolitan area	1'163,091	▲8.18%	Steady
5	FAP Captain Guillermo Concha Iberico International Airport	Piura metropolitan area	1'132,864	▲18.07%	Steady
6	Cad. FAP Guillermo del Castillo Paredes Airport	Tarapoto	892,682	▲5.67%	Steady
7	FAP Captain David Abensur Rengifo International Airport	Coronel Portillo Province	705,691	▲4.37%	Steady
8	FAP Captain José Abelardo Quiñones González International Airport	Chiclayo metropolitan area	672,761	▲22.59%	▲1
9	FAP Captain Carlos Martínez de Pinillos International Airport	Trujillo metropolitan area (Peru)	650,031	▲6.12%	▼1
10	Coronel FAP Carlos Ciriani Santa Rosa International Airport	Tacna Region	480,768	▲10.32%	▲1
11	Inca Manco Cápac International Airport	Puno Region	464,632	▼1.65%	▼1
12	Mayor General FAP Armando Revoredo Iglesias Airport	Cajamarca	462,399	▲30.41%	Steady
13	Padre Aldamiz International Airport	Madre de Dios Region	340,336	▼2.25%	Steady
14	Capitán FAP Víctor Montes Arias International Airport	Talara	318,972	▲63.05%	▲2
15	Jaén Airport	Cajamarca Region	283,672	▲68.74%	▼1

== 2018 ==
=== Peru's 10 busiest airports by passenger traffic ===
Rank	Airport	Serves	Total passengers^{A}	Annual change^{A}
1	Jorge Chávez International Airport	Lima Metropolitan Area	23,659,196	▲7.32%
2	Alejandro Velasco Astete International Airport	Cusco	3,763,300	▲11.35%
3	Rodríguez Ballón International Airport	Arequipa metropolitan area	1,921,316	▲13.75%
4	Coronel FAP Francisco Secada Vignetta International Airport	Iquitos metropolitan area	1'075,167	▲10.60%
5	FAP Captain Guillermo Concha Iberico International Airport	Piura metropolitan area	959,493	▲7.58%
6	Cad. FAP Guillermo del Castillo Paredes Airport	Tarapoto	844,797	▲8.55%
7	FAP Captain David Abensur Rengifo International Airport	Coronel Portillo Province	676,126	▲14.13%
8	FAP Captain Carlos Martínez de Pinillos International Airport	Trujillo metropolitan area (Peru)	612,565	▼-1.01%
9	FAP Captain José Abelardo Quiñones González International Airport	Chiclayo metropolitan area	548,794	▼-3.79%
10	Inca Manco Cápac International Airport	Puno Region	472,448	▲7.58%

== 2017 ==
=== Peru's 10 busiest airports by passenger traffic ===
Rank	Airport	Serves	Total passengers^{A}	Annual change^{A}
1	Jorge Chávez International Airport	Lima Metropolitan Area	22,046,042	▲14.07%
2	Alejandro Velasco Astete International Airport	Cusco	3,379,618	▲5.31%
3	Rodríguez Ballón International Airport	Arequipa metropolitan area	1,689,021	▲3.36%
4	Coronel FAP Francisco Secada Vignetta International Airport	Iquitos metropolitan area	972,145	▲4.08%
5	FAP Captain Guillermo Concha Iberico International Airport	Piura metropolitan area	891,907	▲5.01%
6	Cad. FAP Guillermo del Castillo Paredes Airport	Tarapoto	778,282	▲15.89%
7	FAP Captain Carlos Martínez de Pinillos International Airport	Trujillo metropolitan area (Peru)	618,798	▲10.32%
8	FAP Captain David Abensur Rengifo International Airport	Coronel Portillo Province	592,441	▲18.54%
9	FAP Captain José Abelardo Quiñones González International Airport	Chiclayo metropolitan area	570,423	▲10.42%
10	Inca Manco Cápac International Airport	Puno Region	439,156	▼5.08%

== 2016 ==
=== Peru's 10 busiest airports by passenger traffic ===
Rank	Airport	Serves	Total passengers^{A}	Annual change^{A}
1	Jorge Chávez International Airport	Lima Metropolitan Area	19,326,781	▲9.96%
2	Alejandro Velasco Astete International Airport	Cusco	3,209,153	▲11.07%
3	Rodríguez Ballón International Airport	Arequipa metropolitan area	1,634,090	▲9.49%
4	Coronel FAP Francisco Secada Vignetta International Airport	Iquitos metropolitan area	934,031	▼9.51%
5	FAP Captain Guillermo Concha Iberico International Airport	Piura metropolitan area	849,388	▲1.54%
6	Cad. FAP Guillermo del Castillo Paredes Airport	Tarapoto	671,576	▲5.59%
7	FAP Captain Carlos Martínez de Pinillos International Airport	Trujillo metropolitan area (Peru)	560,922	▲14.85%
8	FAP Captain José Abelardo Quiñones González International Airport	Chiclayo metropolitan area	516,589	▲13.42%
9	FAP Captain David Abensur Rengifo International Airport	Coronel Portillo Province	499,800	▲3.22%
10	Inca Manco Cápac International Airport	Puno Region	462,650	▲9.05%

== 2015 ==
=== Peru's 10 busiest airports by passenger traffic ===
Rank	Airport	Serves	Total passengers^{A}	Annual change^{A}
1	Jorge Chávez International Airport	Lima Metropolitan Area	17,575,919	▲9.4%
2	Alejandro Velasco Astete International Airport	Cusco	2,889,206	▲16.2%
3	Rodríguez Ballón International Airport	Arequipa metropolitan area	1,492,423	▲10.4%
4	Coronel FAP Francisco Secada Vignetta International Airport	Iquitos metropolitan area	1,032,200	▲4.9%
5	FAP Captain Guillermo Concha Iberico International Airport	Piura metropolitan area	836,511	▲11.9%
6	Cad. FAP Guillermo del Castillo Paredes Airport	Tarapoto	636,008	▼2.3%
7	FAP Captain Carlos Martínez de Pinillos International Airport	Trujillo metropolitan area (Peru)	489,258	▲1.9%
8	FAP Captain David Abensur Rengifo International Airport	Coronel Portillo Province	484,204	▲8.4%
9	FAP Captain José Abelardo Quiñones González International Airport	Chiclayo metropolitan area	455,457	▲3.7%
10	Inca Manco Cápac International Airport	Puno Region	424,245	▲14.8%
