= Wayraperú =

Peruvian airline

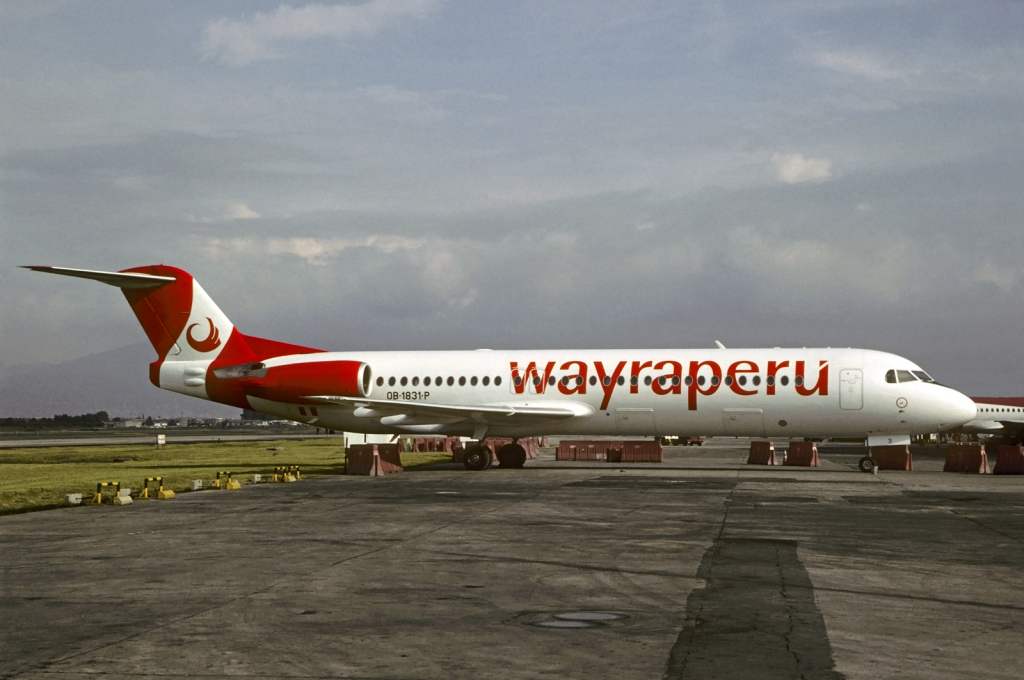
IATA	ICAO	Call sign
7W	WAY	WAYRAPERÚ
- Founded: 2004
- Commenced operations: March 20, 2006 (original); May 24, 2018 (relaunch)
- Hubs: Jorge Chávez International Airport
- Fleet size: 2
- Destinations: 5
- Parent company: Musoq Wayra S.A.C.
- Headquarters: Lima, Peru
- Website: www.wayraperu.pe

Wayraperú S.A.C. is an inactive Peruvian airline based at Jorge Chávez International Airport in Lima, Peru, that operated between March and November 2006, then again from 2018 until 2021.

== History ==
=== Early operations ===
At the end of 2004, the news of the creation of an airline was announced to the media. Wayraperú was the result of the joint venture between the Brazilian company Synergy Group (49%) through its subsidiary OceanAir, and Fondo de Inversiones Sustentables (51%), run by entrepreneur Pedro Koechlin. On March 20, 2006, it formally began operations, inaugurating flights from Lima to Arequipa. At its peak, the airline operated to 14 destinations, with three Fokker 100s previously owned by American Airlines.

On November 27, 2006, all flights were suspended, citing poor management creating an "existential" company crisis. The airline had, according to September 2006 figures, 9% of the Peruvian market with flights to Arequipa, Iquitos, Tacna, Pucallpa, Talara, Tarapoto, Trujillo and Tumbes.

=== Recommence operations ===
On January 30, 2018, Wayraperú announced they would restart operations after 12 years. The announcement came after the airline was due to acquire two Fokker 70s formerly owned by KLM Cityhopper. The airline had an active air services license from the Ministry of Transportation and Communications of Peru that allowed it to carry out domestic passenger charter flights from its main base in Lima, as well as Iquitos, Tarapoto, Pucallpa and Chachapoyas. However, the airline did not yet have an air operator's certificate.

On May 24, 2018, Wayraperú recommenced operations using a Fokker 70 from Tarapoto to Juan Simons Vela Airport on a reconnaissance flight, with airline employees and the mayor of Rioja, Mercedes Torres, on board. The airline reportedly would also begin twice-weekly flights between Rioja and Lima from June 2018, which could have increased frequency according to demand.

By 2021, Wayraperú had its last aircraft retired and stored in Lima, and its official web page has since shut down.

== Destinations ==
City	Airport	Notes	Refs
Arequipa	Rodríguez Ballón International Airport	Terminated	
Cajamarca	Mayor General FAP Armando Revoredo Iglesias Airport	Terminated	
Chiclayo	FAP Captain José Abelardo Quiñones González International Airport	Terminated	
Cusco	Alejandro Velasco Astete International Airport	Terminated	
Huánuco	Alférez FAP David Figueroa Fernandini Airport	Charter	
Iquitos	Coronel FAP Francisco Secada Vignetta International Airport	Terminated	
Lima	Jorge Chávez International Airport	Hub	
Máncora	Walter Braedt Segú Airport	Charter	
Piura	PAF Captain Guillermo Concha Iberico International Airport	Terminated	
Pucallpa	FAP Captain David Abensur Rengifo International Airport	Terminated	
Puerto Maldonado	Padre Aldamiz International Airport	Terminated	
Rioja	Juan Simons Vela Airport	Charter	
Tacna	Coronel FAP Carlos Ciriani Santa Rosa International Airport	Terminated	
Talara	Capitán FAP Víctor Montes Arias International Airport	Terminated	
Tarapoto	Cadete FAP Guillermo del Castillo Paredes Airport	Terminated	
Trujillo	Capitán FAP Carlos Martínez de Pinillos International Airport	Terminated	
Tumbes	FAP Captain Pedro Canga Rodríguez Airport	Terminated	
Yurimaguas	Moisés Benzaquén Rengifo Airport	Charter	

== See also ==
- List of airlines of Peru
