= Aero Cóndor =

Defunct Peruvian airline

IATA	ICAO	Call sign
Q6	CDP	CÓNDOR-PERÚ
- Founded: 1975
- Ceased operations: June 2008
- Hubs: Jorge Chávez International Airport
- Fleet size: 8
- Destinations: 15
- Headquarters: Lima, Peru
- Key people: Carlos A. Palacín Fernández (CEO and Founder)
- Website: www.aerocondor.com.pe

Aero Cóndor S.A., also known as Aero Cóndor Peru, was an airline based in Lima, the capital of Peru. It was founded and started operations in 1975, and provides domestic charter flights, cargo, scenic, and air ambulance services. Its main hub is Jorge Chávez International Airport in Lima.

== History ==
Aero Cóndor operated an extensive domestic network of more than fifteen destinations until June 2008, when most scheduled services were suspended due to the high fuel prices. On the same month, the Peruvian Ministry of Transportation and Communications ordered the grounding of their fleet of Boeing 737 airliners due to safety concerns as these aircraft had been recently involved in several incidents. Nowadays, the company only serves scenic and charter flight.

== Operations ==
The company is only active at the domain of scenic tourist flights and charter flights.

=== Former scheduled destinations ===
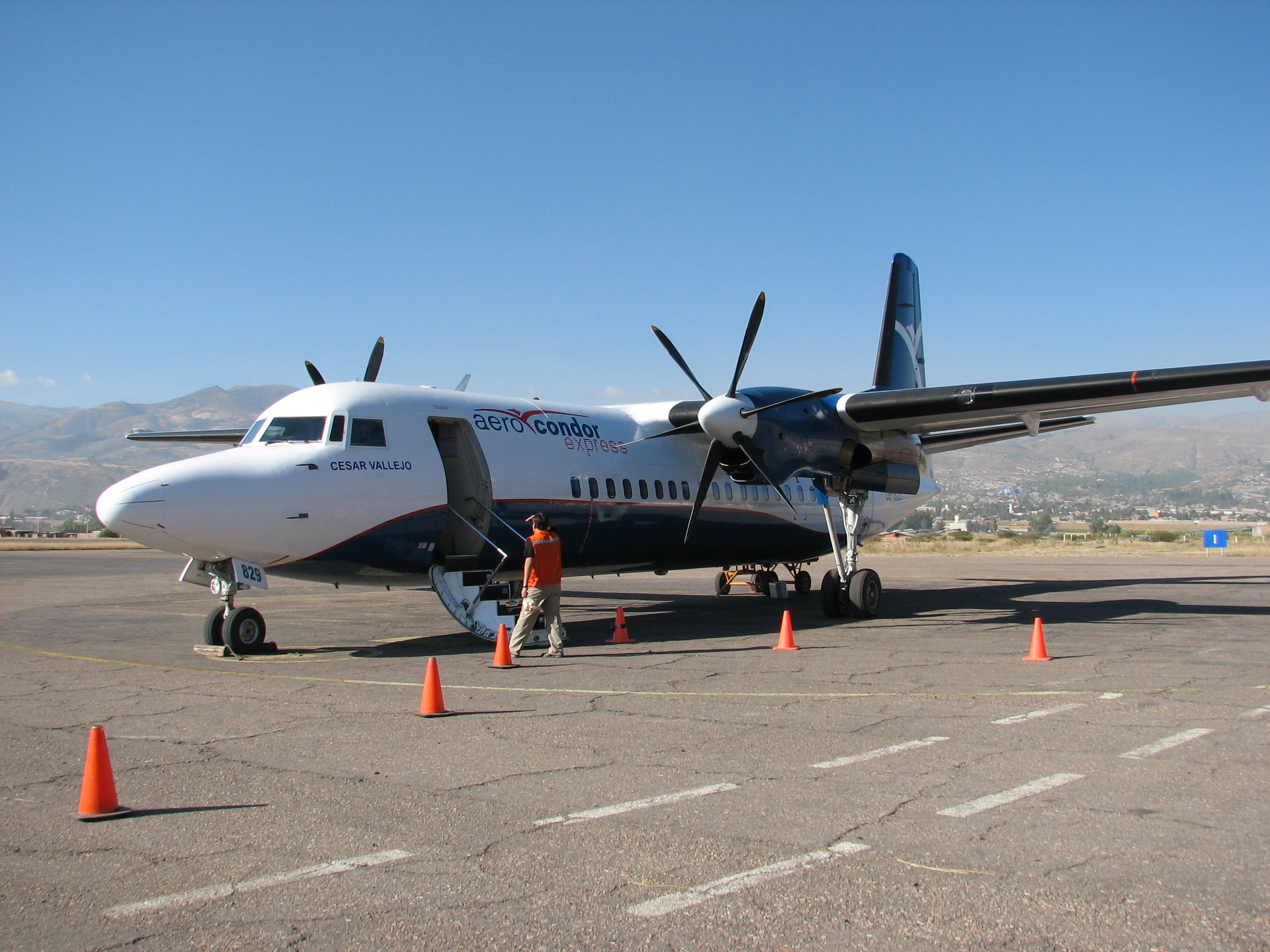
One of Aero Cóndor's Fokker 50s at Coronel FAP Alfredo Mendívil Duarte Airport, Ayacucho in 2007

- Arequipa (Rodríguez Ballón International Airport)
- Ayacucho (Coronel FAP Alfredo Mendivil Duarte Airport)
- Cajamarca (Major General FAP Armando Revoredo Iglesias Airport)
- Chiclayo (FAP Captain José Abelardo Quiñones González International Airport)
- Cusco (Alejandro Velasco Astete International Airport)
- Iquitos (Crnl. FAP Francisco Secada Vignetta International Airport)
- Juliaca (Inca Manco Capac International Airport)
- Lima (Jorge Chávez International Airport) Hub
- Piura (Cap. FAP Guillermo Concha Iberico International Airport)
- Pucallpa (Captain Rolden International Airport)
- Puerto Maldonado (Padre Aldamiz International Airport)
- Tacna (Crnl. FAP Carlos Ciriani Santa Rosa International Airport)
- Talara (Cap. FAP Víctor Montes Arias Airport)
- Trujillo (Cap. FAP Carlos Martínez de Pinillos International Airport)
- Tumbes (Cap. FAP Pedro Canga Rodríguez Airport)

== Fleet ==
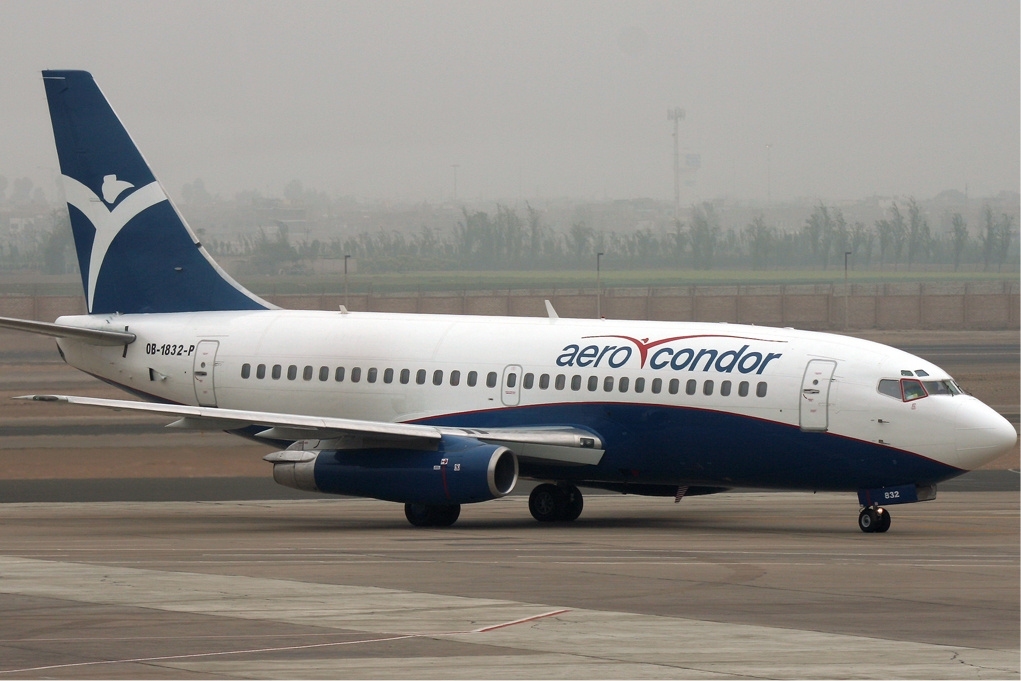
An Aero Cóndor Boeing 737-200 at Jorge Chávez International Airport in 2006

Aero Cóndor consisted of the following aircraft:

- 1 Antonov An-24RV
- 1 Antonov An-26
- 1 BAe 146-200
- 1 Boeing 727-200F
- 5 Boeing 737-200
- 3 Cessna 208B Grand Caravan
- 1 Fokker F27-100
- 1 Fokker F27-200
- 1 Fokker 50

== Accidents and incidents ==
- On March 10, 1989, a Britten-Norman BN-2 Islander (registered OB-T-1271) struck a radio antenna and crashed onto a building located into residential area of Lima, on approach to Jorge Chávez International Airport. All 10 occupants on board were killed.
