= TANS Perú =

Peruvian airline based in Lima

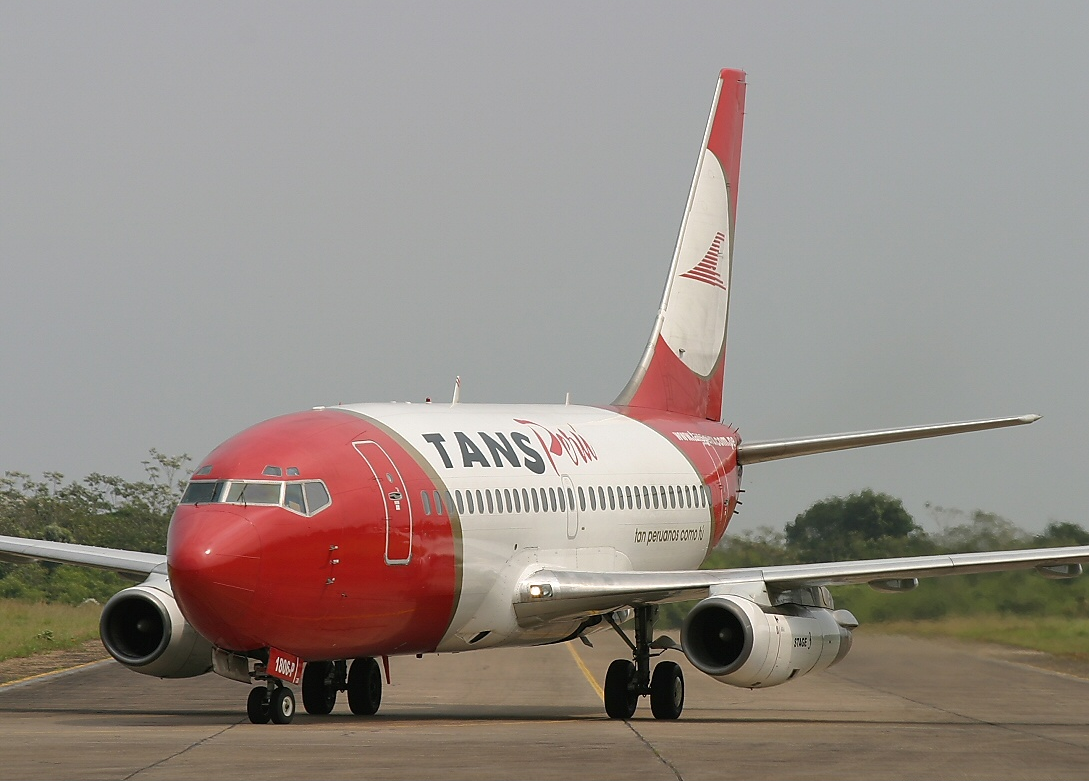
- Boeing 737-200
IATA	ICAO	Call sign
TJ	ELV	AEREOS SELVA
- Founded: 1963
- Commenced operations: November 1999
- Ceased operations: 2006
- Hubs: Jorge Chávez International Airport
- Frequent-flyer program: Boleto Premio
- Destinations: 11
- Parent company: Peruvian Government (100%)
- Headquarters: Miraflores, Lima, Peru
- Key people: Fernando Levano Castillo (President)
- Website: www.tansperu.com.pe

TANS Perú, an acronym for Transportes Aéreos Nacionales de Selva, was a Peruvian airline based in Lima. The airline was headquartered at the Miraflores District in the capital city of the country. Completely state-owned, the carrier operated scheduled domestic passenger and cargo services from its main base at Jorge Chávez International Airport.

== History ==
TANS (also known as Grupo Aéreo de Transporte 42) was established in 1963 as an arm of the Peruvian Air Force, based at the remote city of Iquitos, inaccessible by road, and tasked with providing scheduled airline flights, together with fulfilling search and rescue and medevac needs. In 1988, its fleet consisted of a mixture of Pilatus PC-6 Porters and de Havilland Canada DHC-6 Twin Otters, mainly operating as floatplanes. Although its missions were mainly civilian, it remained part of the Air Force until 1999, being granted civil certification in November 1999.

At March 2000, the fleet included three Boeing 737-200s, seven de Havilland DHC-6 Twin Otter Series 300, one Fokker F-28 Mk1000 and five Harbin Y-12s; at this time, services to Arequipa, Chiclayo, Cuzco, Iquitos, Juanjuí, Juliaca, Lima, Piura, Pucallpa, Rioja, Trujillo and Yurimaguas were operated. In January 2006 the airline's license was suspended by the Peruvian Government.

== Destinations ==
TANS Perú served the following destinations throughout its history:

City	Airport code		Airport name	Notes
City	IATA	ICAO	Airport name	Notes
Arequipa	AQP	SPQU	Rodríguez Ballón International Airport	
Cuzco	CUZ	SPZO	Alejandro Velasco Astete International Airport	
Iquitos	IQT	SPQT	Crnl. FAP Francisco Secada Vignetta International Airport	
Juliaca	JUL	SPJL	Inca Manco Cápac International Airport	
Lima	LIM	SPIM	Jorge Chávez International Airport	Hub
Piura	PIU	SPUR	Cap. FAP Guillermo Concha Iberico International Airport	
Pucallpa	PCL	SPCL	FAP Captain David Abenzur Rengifo International Airport	
Puerto Maldonado	PEM	SPTU	Padre Aldamiz International Airport	
Tarapoto	TPP	SPST	Cad. FAP Guillermo del Castillo Paredes Airport	
Tumbes	TBP	SPME	Cap. FAP Pedro Canga Rodríguez Airport	

== Accidents and incidents ==
Aviation Safety Network records six accidents/incidents for the airline, of which five led to fatalities; the number of casualties involved in these deadly accidents totals 105. All the events the airline experienced throughout its history carried with the hull-loss of the aircraft involved. Following is the list of these events.

Date	Location	Aircraft	Tail number	Fate	Fatalities	Description of the event	Refs
27 August 1992	(Peru) San Antonio del Estrecho	Twin Otter 300	OB-1153	W/O	8/21	The pilot attempted to land the aircraft on the Algodón River following the loss of power. Hit trees on approach and crashed.	
21 October 1992	(Peru) Lake Caballochoa	Twin Otter 300	OB-1155	W/O	8/11	Crashed into a lake following an engine failure.	
14 May 1993	(Peru) Atalaya	Harbin Yunshuji Y-12-II	OB-1499	W/O	0	Overran the runway on landing.	
4 April 1995	(Peru) Iquitos	Harbin Yunshuji Y-12-II	OB-1498	W/O	3/3	Crashed during initial climbout, shortly after takeoff from Crnl. FAP Francisco Secada Vignetta International Airport.	
9 January 2003	(Peru) Chachapoyas	Fokker F-28-1000	OB-1396	W/O	46/46	The aircraft was operating the second leg of a domestic scheduled Lima–Chiclayo–Chachapoyas passenger service as Flight 222. Crashed into Cerro Coloque on approach to the final destination airport.	
23 August 2005	(Peru) Pucallpa	Boeing 737-200	OB-1809-P	W/O	40/98	Crash-landed in a swampland on approach to Pucallpa Airport amid a hail storm. Was operating a domestic scheduled Lima–Pucallpa–Iquitos passenger service as Flight 204.	

== See also ==
- List of airlines of Peru
- Transport in Peru
