= Avianca Perú =

Peruvian airline

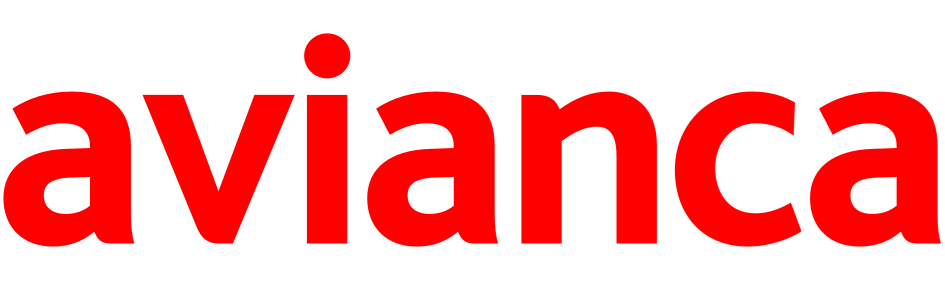
IATA	ICAO	Call sign
T0	TPU	AVIANCA PERÚ
- Founded: 1999
- Ceased operations: May 10, 2020
- Hubs: Jorge Chávez International Airport
- Focus cities: Alejandro Velasco Astete International Airport
- Frequent-flyer program: LifeMiles
- Alliance: Star Alliance (affiliate; 2012-2020)
- Fleet size: 5
- Destinations: 15
- Parent company: Avianca Holdings
- Founders: Daniel Ratti; Ernesto Mahle
- Website: www.avianca.com

Avianca Perú S.A. (formerly TACA Perú) was an airline based in Lima, Peru. It operated domestic services and international services. Its main base was Jorge Chávez International Airport, Lima. The airline operated out of 18 airports. It was part of the Synergy Group and operated its flights with TACA Airlines' codes. Through Synergy Group, it was one of the seven nationally branded airlines (Avianca Ecuador, Avianca Costa Rica, etc.) in the Avianca Holdings group of Latin American airlines. The airline ceased all operations on May 10, 2020.

== History ==
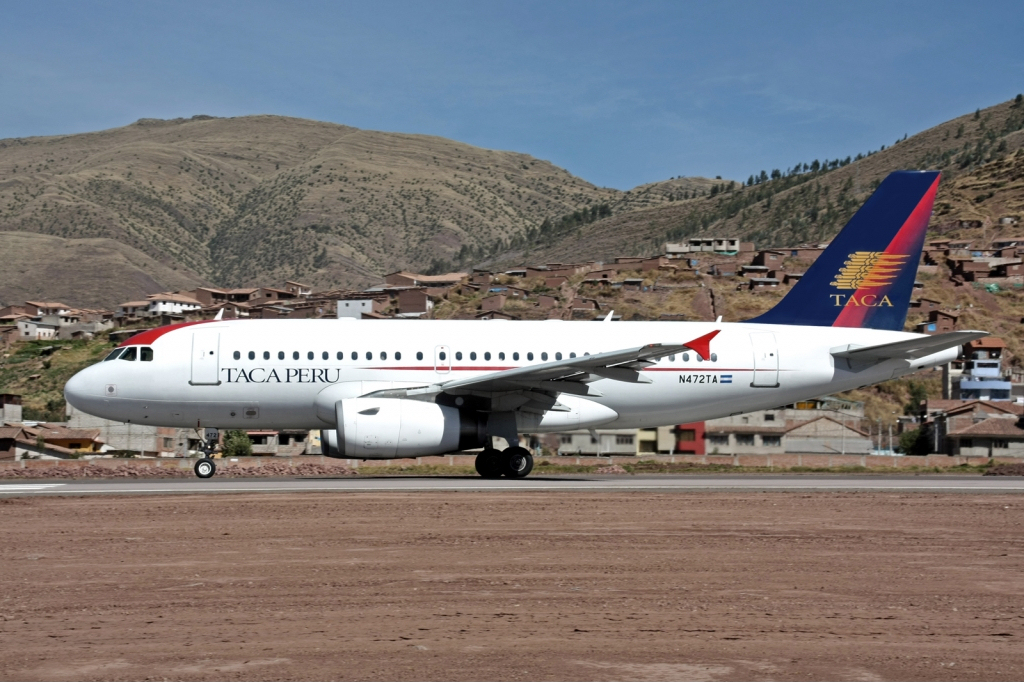
A TACA Perú Airbus A319-100 taxiing at Alejandro Velasco Astete International Airport in 2010

The airline was established in 1999 by Daniel Ratti and Ernesto Mahle as TransAm and started operations in July 1999. It was then rebranded into TACA Perú when Grupo TACA established a holding in the airline.

In 2004, a crisis arose in the aviation industry in Peru, caused by the cessation of operations of Aero Continente, the main operator of internal flights. During this period, TACA Perú made some flights to the city of Arequipa's Rodríguez Ballón International Airport.

In 2007, TACA Perú began a period of expansion and relaunch, increasing the frequencies of its flights to the main cities of Central and South America, offering a wide range of connecting flights from Lima to North America in the mornings and evenings.

In 2012, new national destinations were included and the airline acquired its first and only Airbus A330-200 for medium-range international flights. a change of name was then announced and the airline assumed a new commercial identity within the AviancaTaca Holding group, under the Avianca brand.

On May 28, 2013, the airline was renamed to Avianca Perú after the AviancaTaca merger. At the time, it was owned by Daniel Ratti (51%) and the Synergy Group (49%).

In 2015, flights to São Paulo and San Salvador were added, those were operated with its Airbus A330-200. Regarding domestic flights, Chiclayo and Tarapoto were suspended indefinitely, allocating the planes used to an increase in frequencies to Cuzco.

On May 10, 2020, Avianca Holdings announced the cancellation of operations in Peru following its filing for bankruptcy protection, starting a process of liquidation and closure of Avianca Perú, which ended the airline after 21 years of operation. This took place during a worldwide airline travel downturn caused by the COVID-19 pandemic.

== Destinations ==
This is a list of airports that Avianca Perú flew to before it ceased operations in May 2020.

Country	City	Airport	Notes	Refs
Argentina	Buenos Aires	Ministro Pistarini International Airport		
Argentina	Mendoza	Governor Francisco Gabrielli International Airport	Terminated	
Bolivia	La Paz	El Alto International Airport	Operated by Avianca Ecuador	
Bolivia	Santa Cruz de la Sierra	Viru Viru International Airport	Terminated	
Brazil	Brasília	Brasília International Airport	Terminated	
Brazil	Porto Alegre	Salgado Filho Porto Alegre International Airport		
Brazil	Rio de Janeiro	Rio de Janeiro/Galeão International Airport		
Brazil	São Paulo	São Paulo-Guarulhos International Airport		
Chile	Antofagasta	Andrés Sabella Gálvez International Airport	Terminated	
Chile	Santiago	Arturo Merino Benítez International Airport	Operated by Avianca Costa Rica	
Colombia	Bogotá	El Dorado International Airport		
Colombia	Cali	Alfonso Bonilla Aragón International Airport	Terminated	
Colombia	Medellín	José María Córdova International Airport	Terminated	
Costa Rica	San José	Juan Santamaría International Airport		
Cuba	Havana	José Martí International Airport	Terminated	
Dominican Republic	Punta Cana	Punta Cana International Airport	Terminated	
Ecuador	Guayaquil	José Joaquín de Olmedo International Airport	Operated by Avianca Ecuador	
Ecuador	Quito	Mariscal Sucre International Airport	Operated by Avianca Ecuador	
El Salvador	San Salvador	El Salvador International Airport		
Mexico	Cancún	Cancún International Airport	Terminated	
Mexico	Mexico City	Mexico City International Airport		
Paraguay	Asunción	Silvio Pettirossi International Airport	Terminated	
Peru	Arequipa	Rodríguez Ballón International Airport	Terminated	
Peru	Chiclayo	FAP Captain José Abelardo Quiñones González International Airport	Terminated	
Peru	Cusco	Alejandro Velasco Astete International Airport	Focus city	
Peru	Juliaca	Inca Manco Cápac International Airport	Terminated	
Peru	Iquitos	Coronel FAP Francisco Secada Vignetta International Airport	Terminated	
Peru	Lima	Jorge Chávez International Airport	Hub	
Peru	Piura	Cap. FAP Guillermo Concha Iberico International Airport	Terminated	
Peru	Puerto Maldonado	Padre Aldamiz International Airport	Terminated	
Peru	Tarapoto	Cad. FAP Guillermo del Castillo Paredes Airport	Terminated	
Peru	Trujillo	Cap. FAP Carlos Martínez de Pinillos International Airport	Terminated	
United States	Miami	Miami International Airport		
Uruguay	Montevideo	Carrasco International Airport	Terminated	
Venezuela	Caracas	Simón Bolívar International Airport	Terminated	

== Fleet ==
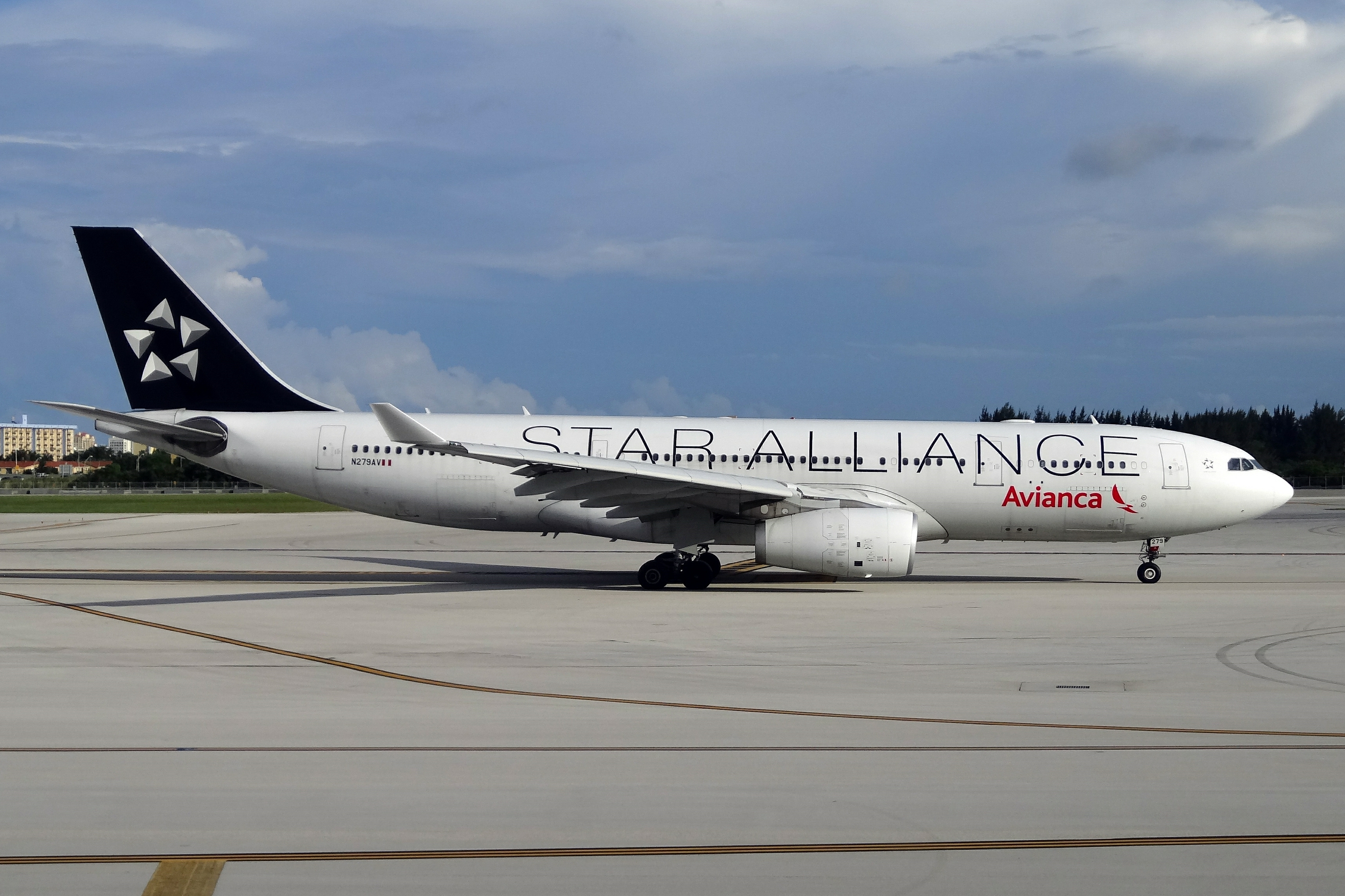
An Avianca Perú Airbus A330-200 at Miami International Airport in 2014

The Avianca Perú fleet consisted of the following aircraft (as of March 2020):

Avianca Perú fleet
Aircraft	In service	Orders	Passengers			Notes
Aircraft	In service	Orders	C	Y	Total	Notes
Airbus A319-100	1	—	12	108	120	
Airbus A320-200	2	—	12	138	150	
Airbus A321-200	1	—	12	182	194	
Airbus A330-200	1	—	30	222	252	
Total	5	—				

=== Retired fleet ===
Avianca Perú previously operated the following aircraft:

Retired Avianca Perú fleet
Aircraft	Total	Introduced	Retired	Notes
Boeing 737-200	3	1999	2004	

== See also ==
- List of defunct airlines of Peru
