= IQT =

IQT may refer to:

- Coronel FAP Francisco Secada Vignetta International Airport, IATA code IQT, airport in Iquitos, Peru
- Ignition Quality Tester, method of measuring the derived cetane number
- In-Q-Tel, American not-for-profit venture capital firm
