= JetSmart Perú =

Peruvian low-cost airline

IATA	ICAO	Call sign
JZ	JAP	RED SMART
- Founded: 17 February 2021
- Commenced operations: 14 June 2022
- Operating bases: Jorge Chávez International Airport; Rodríguez Ballón International Airport
- Fleet size: 8
- Destinations: 16
- Parent company: JetSmart
- Headquarters: Lima, Peru
- Website: jetsmart.com/pe/es/

JetSmart Airlines Perú S.A.C., styled as JetSMART, is a Peruvian airline owned by the Chilean ultra low-cost carrier JetSmart, itself owned by Indigo Partners. Its primary base of operations is Jorge Chávez International Airport, servicing Lima, Peru, and has a secondary base at Rodríguez Ballón International Airport, in Arequipa, Peru.

== Destinations ==
JetSmart Perú operates to the following destinations:

Country	City	Airport	Notes	Refs
Chile	Santiago	Arturo Merino Benítez International Airport		
Colombia	Cartagena	Rafael Núñez International Airport		
Colombia	Cúcuta	Camilo Daza International Airport		
Colombia	Medellín	José María Córdova International Airport		
Ecuador	Guayaquil	José Joaquín de Olmedo International Airport		
Ecuador	Quito	Mariscal Sucre International Airport		
Perú	Arequipa	Rodríguez Ballón International Airport	Base	
Perú	Cajamarca	Mayor General FAP Armando Revoredo Iglesias Airport		
Perú	Chiclayo	FAP Captain José Abelardo Quiñones González International Airport		
Perú	Cuzco	Alejandro Velasco Astete International Airport		
Perú	Iquitos	Coronel FAP Francisco Secada Vignetta International Airport	Terminated	
Perú	Juliaca	Inca Manco Cápac International Airport		
Perú	Lima	Jorge Chávez International Airport	Base	
Perú	Piura	PAF Captain Guillermo Concha Iberico International Airport		
Perú	Talara	Capitán FAP Víctor Montes Arias International Airport		
Perú	Tarapoto	Cadete FAP Guillermo del Castillo Paredes Airport		
Perú	Trujillo	FAP Captain Carlos Martínez de Pinillos International Airport		

== Fleet ==
As of August 2025, JetSmart Perú operates the following aircraft:

JetSmart Perú fleet
Aircraft	In service	Orders	Passengers	Notes
Airbus A320neo	8	–	186	
Total	8	–		

== See also ==
- List of airlines of Peru
