= San Lorenzo Airport, Peru =

San Lorenzo Airport
- IATA: none; ICAO: SPQM

Summary
- Airport type: Public
- Serves: San Lorenzo, Peru
- Elevation AMSL: 433 ft / 132 m
- Coordinates: 4°49′25″S 76°33′40″W

Map
- Location of the airport in Peru

Runways
| Direction | Length | | Surface |
| Direction | m | ft | Surface |
|---|---|---|---|
| 12/30 | 980 | 3,215 | Gravel |
- Source: GCM Google Maps

San Lorenzo Airport (ICAO: SPQM) is an airport serving the Marañón River town of San Lorenzo in the Loreto Region of Peru.

== Airlines and destinations ==
| Airlines | Destinations |
|---|---|
| Saeta Peru | Iquitos, Yurimaguas |

== See also ==
- Transport in Peru
- List of airports in Peru
