= Spms =

SPMS may refer to one of the following:

- South Pasadena Middle School, a public middle school located in South Pasadena, California
- Airport code for Moisés Benzaquén Rengifo Airport in Peru.
- Secondary progressive multiple sclerosis
