= Aeropuertos del Perú =

Peruvian private airport operator

Aeropuertos del Perú (AdP)
- Industry: Transport
- Founded: October 30, 2006
- Headquarters: Jirón Doménico Morelli 110, Ofi. 301, San Borja District, Lima, Peru
- Key people: Evans Avendaño (General Manager)
- Products: Airport operations and services
- Website: www.adp.com.pe

Airports of Peru (Spanish: Aeropuertos del Perú) is a private company that operates twelve regional airports in Peru. It is the first group of regional airports the government of Peru transferred to a private operator. The company was incorporated on October 30, 2006.

== History ==
In 2013, AdP invested US$112 million in the renovation of the runways of three airports: Chiclayo, Piura y Talara.

== Activity ==
In December 2014, AdP was 100% acquired by Talma, a Peruvian airport services company that belongs to the Sandoval group and Enfoca Inversiones.

AdP's partners comprise Swissport GBH Perú, an air cargo warehousing, ramp services, and maintenance company in the Jorge Chávez International Airport area, and GBH Investments, the holding of Swissport GBH group that brings expertise in infrastructure project management.

AdP is being advised by the ANA Aeroportos de Portugal, providing know-how, experience and expertise in airports management to Aeropuertos del Perú. ANA operates six regional airports in Portugal: Flores, Horta, Ponta Delgada, Santa María, Lisbon and Faro.

== Airports operated by AdP ==
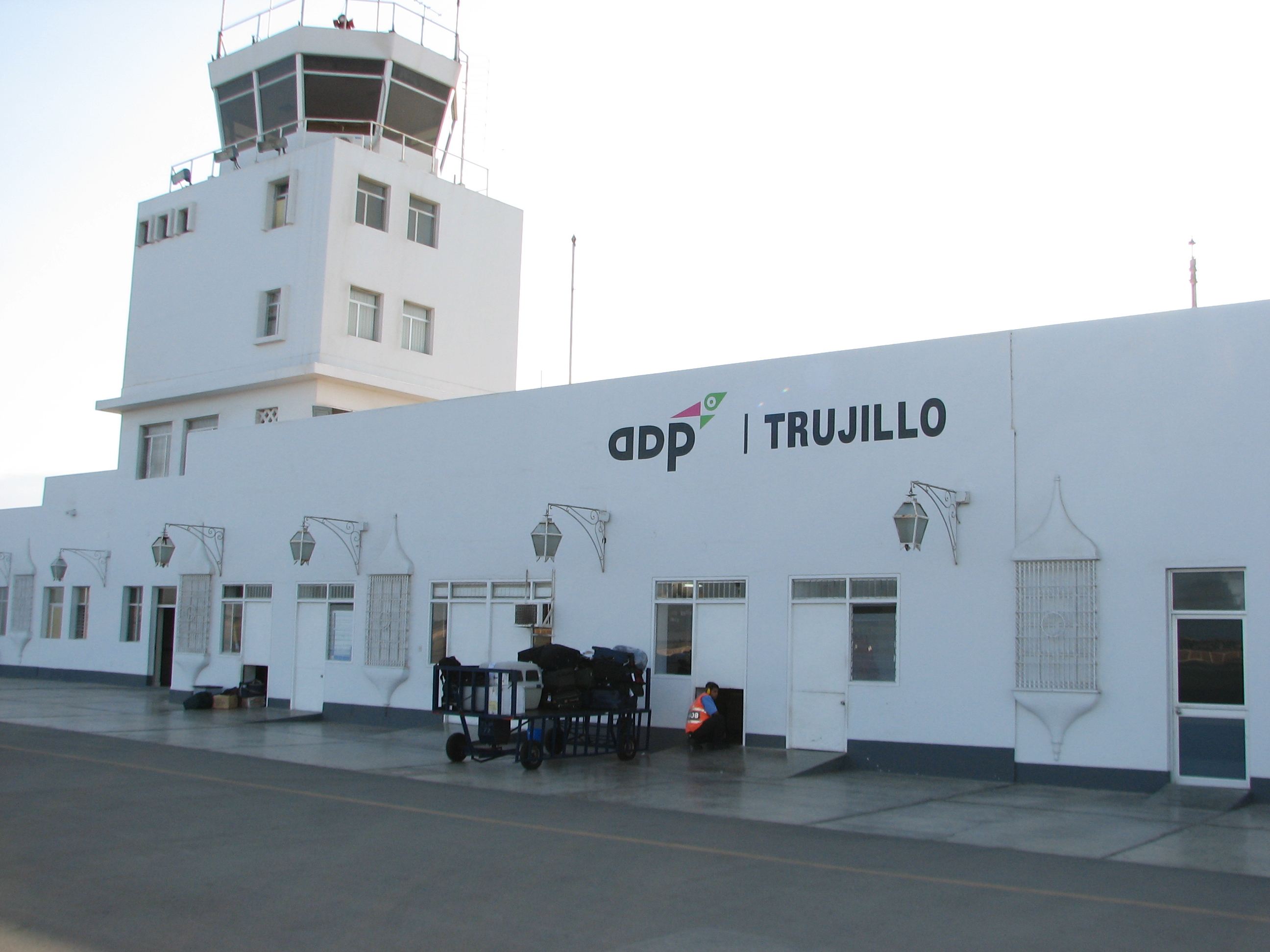
Trujillo airport

The following airports are operated by Aeropuertos del Perú (AdP). All but one (in Pisco) are located in Northern Peru.

| City | Airport |
|---|---|
| Cajamarca | Mayor General FAP Armando Revoredo Iglesias Airport |
| Chachapoyas | Chachapoyas Airport |
| Chiclayo | FAP Captain José Abelardo Quiñones González International Airport |
| Huaraz | Comandante FAP Germán Arias Graziani Airport |
| Iquitos | Crnl. FAP Francisco Secada Vignetta International Airport |
| Pisco | Capitán FAP Renán Elías Olivera Airport |
| Piura | Cap. FAP Guillermo Concha Iberico International Airport |
| Pucallpa | FAP Captain David Abenzur Rengifo International Airport |
| Talara | Cap. FAP Víctor Montes Arias Airport |
| Tarapoto | Cad. FAP Guillermo del Castillo Paredes Airport |
| Trujillo | Cap. FAP Carlos Martínez de Pinillos International Airport |
| Tumbes | Cap. FAP Pedro Canga Rodríguez Airport |

== See also ==
- Lima Airport Partners
- Jorge Chávez International Airport
- CORPAC

=== External links ===
(in Spanish) Official website
