= Lieutenant Bergerie Airport =

Airport in Peru

Lieutenant Bergerie Airport Antiguo aeropuerto de Iquitos
- IATA: none; ICAO: SPID

Summary
- Airport type: Public
- Owner: Fuerza Aerea del Perú
- Operator: Grupo Aéreo nº 42
- Location: Iquitos
- Closed: 1979
- Elevation AMSL: 299 ft (91 m)
- Coordinates: 3°44′28″S 73°15′42″W
- Interactive map of Lieutenant Bergerie Airport

Runways
Direction	Length		Surface
Direction	ft	m	Surface
13/31	4,790	1,460	Concrete

Lieutenant Bergerie Airport is a military airport in the city of Iquitos, Peru. In the past, it was the commercial airport of that city, but it has since been replaced by Crnl. FAP Francisco Secada Vignetta International Airport.
