= Juan Simons Vela Airport =

Airport in Peru

- IATA: RIJ; ICAO: SPJA

Summary
- Airport type: Public
- Operator: CORPAC S.A.
- Serves: Rioja, Peru
- Elevation AMSL: 2,707 ft / 825 m
- Coordinates: 6°04′05″S 77°09′35″W

Map
- Location of the airport in Peru

Runways
Direction	Length		Surface
Direction	m	ft	Surface
16/34	1,880	6,168	Asphalt
- Sources: DGAC World Aero Data Google Maps

Juan Simons Vela Airport (IATA: RIJ, ICAO: SPJA) is a public airport serving Rioja, Department of San Martín, Peru.

The Rioja non-directional beacon (Ident: RIO) is located 1.8 nautical miles (3.3 km) off the threshold of runway 16.

== Airlines and destinations ==
Airlines	Destinations
Saeta Peru	Jaén, Tarapoto

== See also ==
- Transport in Peru
- List of airports in Peru
