= Iquitos metropolitan area =

Coordinates: 3.7294°S 73.2383°W

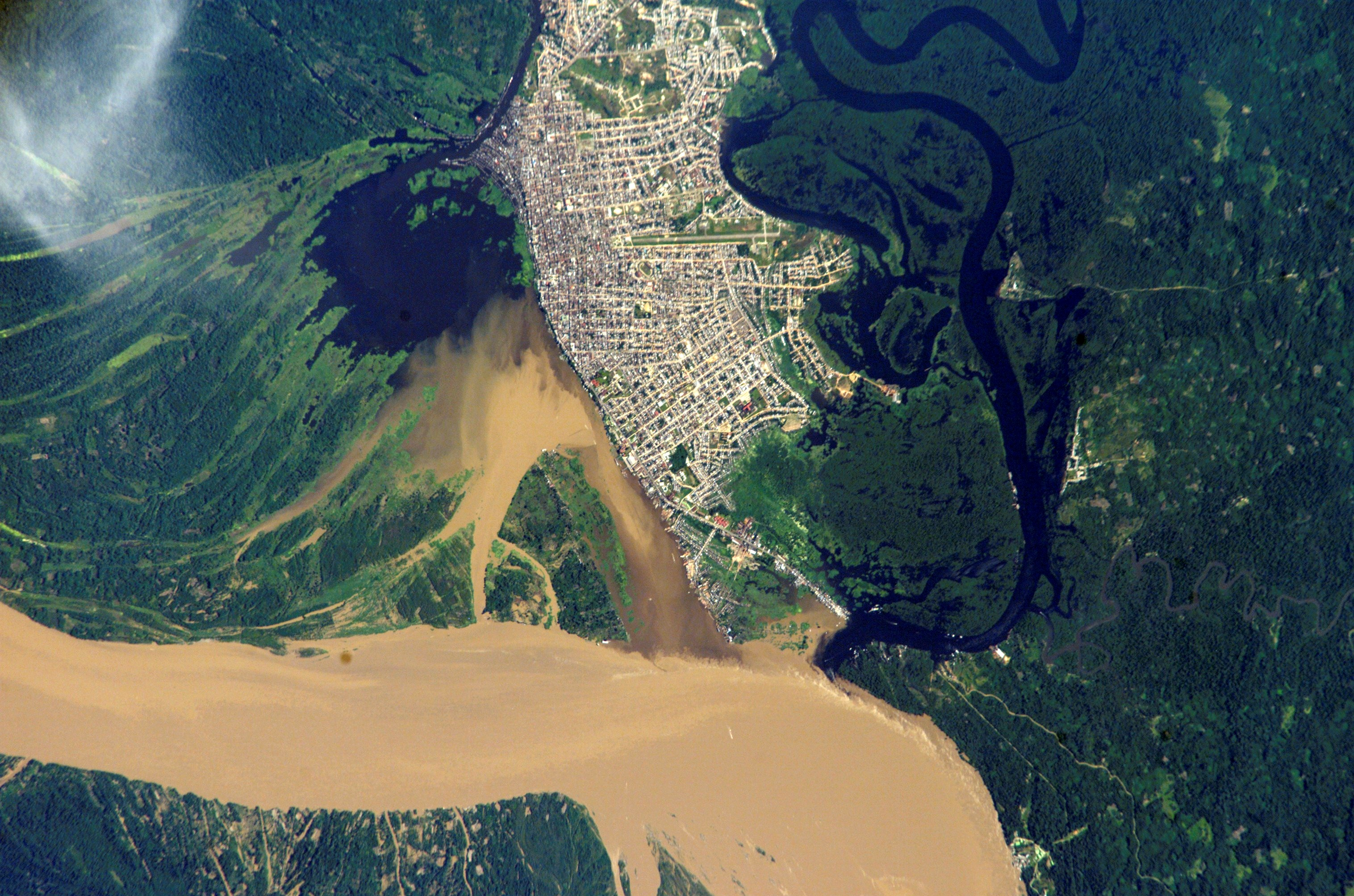
- Interactive map of Iquitos metropolitan area
- Country: Peru
- Region: Loreto
- Province: Maynas
- Largest city: Iquitos

Population (2007 Census)
  - Total: 406.340(year 2,007); 471.993(year 2,015)
- Time zone: UTC-5 (PET)

The Iquitos Metropolitan Area is the name used to refer to the Peruvian metropolitan area whose principal city is Iquitos, according to Municipality of Iquitos. According to population statistics of INEI It is the sixth most populous metropolitan area of Peru in year 2015.

== Metropolitan districts ==
According to studies of municipality of Maynas Iquitos metropolitan area consist in four districts: Iquitos, Belén, Punchana and San Juan Bautista. The estimated population of INEI for the metropolitan districts in year 2015 is shown in the following table.

Metropolitan Districts	Area km²	Houses (2007)	Density (pop./km²)*	Elevation media msl*	Distance to Iquitos (km)	Population Census 2007	Population 2015
Iquitos.	358,15	32.853	444,01	106 m.s.n.m.	0 km	159.023*	150.484
Belén.	632,8	13.581	108,73	110 m.s.n.m.		68.806*	75.685
Punchana.	1.573,39	15.261	48,58	105 m.s.n.m.		76.435*	91.128
San Juan Bautista.	3.117,05	23.981	32,75	138 m.s.n.m.		102.076*	154.696
Total	5.681,39 km2	85.676	71,52	—	—	406.340*	471.993
Sources:Census 2007, Estimated Population 2015

== See also ==
- Maynas Province
- List of metropolitan areas of Peru
- Peru
