= Moisés Benzaquén Rengifo Airport =

Airport in Peru

- IATA: YMS; ICAO: SPMS

Summary
- Airport type: Public
- Owner/Operator: CORPAC S.A.
- Serves: Yurimaguas, Loreto, Peru
- Elevation AMSL: 587 ft (179 m)
- Coordinates: 5°53′37″S 76°07′05″W

Map
- Location of the airport in Peru

Runways
Direction	Length		Surface
Direction	m	ft	Surface
09/27	1,800	5,906	Asphalt
- Sources: DGAC WAD GCM Google Maps

Moisés Benzaquén Rengifo Airport (Spanish: Aeropuerto Moisés Benzaquén Rengifo) (IATA: YMS, ICAO: SPMS) is a public airport serving Yurimaguas, a town on the Huallaga River in the Loreto Region of Peru. It is owned and operated by CORPAC S.A., a civil government agency. It was established in 1937.

The airport receives daily scheduled flights from Iquitos and Tarapoto operated by the Peruvian Air Force in an agreement with private operator SkyWay.

== Airlines and destinations ==
Airlines	Destinations
Saeta Perú	Iquitos, San Lorenzo, Tarapoto
SkyWay	Iquitos

== See also ==
- Transport in Peru
- List of airports in Peru
