= Capitán FAP Víctor Montes Arias International Airport =

Airport in Peru

Cap. FAP Victor Montes Arias Airport Aeropuerto Capitán FAP Víctor Montes Arias
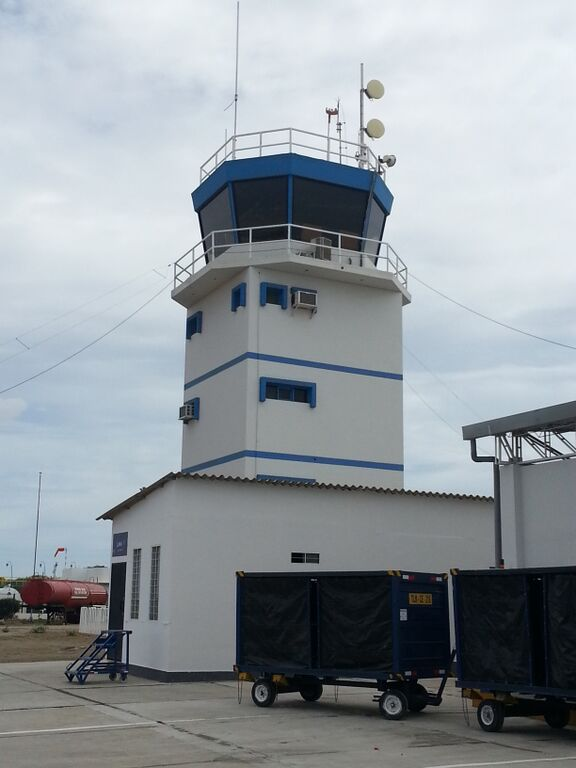
- IATA: TYL; ICAO: SPYL

Summary
- Airport type: Public
- Operator: ADP
- Serves: Talara, Peru
- Elevation AMSL: 282 ft (86 m)
- Coordinates: 4°34′35″S 81°15′15″W

Map
- Location of airport in Peru

Runways
Direction	Length		Surface
Direction	m	ft	Surface
17/35	2,450	8,038	Asphalt
- Sources: WAD GCM

Cap. FAP Víctor Montes Arias International Airport (Spanish: Aeropuerto Capitán FAP Víctor Montes Arias, IATA: TYL, ICAO: SPYL) is an airport serving Talara, Peru. It is run by AdP S.A. (Aeropuertos del Perú S.A.). An important airport in the Piura Region, it is used both as a relief airport for Cap. FAP Guillermo Concha Iberico International Airport and for faster access to the famous Los Órganos, Máncora and Punta Sal beaches.

== History ==
During World War II, the airport was used by the United States Army Air Forces Sixth Air Force defending the South American coastline against Axis powers submarines. The first American forces arrived on March 8, 1942 and construction of barracks and other facilities began during August. The station complement was the 336th Service Group which provided the necessary support resources for the personnel assigned.

American flying units assigned to the airport were:

- 397th Bombardment Squadron (6th Bombardment Group) August 18, 1942 – May 4, 1943 (LB-30 (B-24A) Liberator) (Northrup A-17A Nomad)
- 51st Fighter Squadron (32d Fighter Group) Dec, 1942-March 9, 1943 (P-40 Warhawk)
- 3d Bombardment Squadron (6th Bombardment Group) Apr, 1-May 23, 1943 (LB-30 (B-24A) Liberator)
- 91st Reconnaissance Squadron (1st Photographic Group) 1943-1944 (B-25/F-10 Mitchell)

In July 1944, the last aircraft departed from the airport, and most Americans departed. A few remained manning a communications station operated by the Army Communications Service 153d Communications Squadron. The communications facility remained open until January 31, 1947, largely training Peruvian military personnel in communications.

== El Pato Air Base ==
El Pato Air Base of the Peruvian Air Force is located 4.5 km (2.8 mi) north-east of FAP Captain Víctor Montes Arias International Airport.

== Airlines and destinations ==
Airlines	Destinations
JetSmart Perú	Lima
LATAM Perú	Lima
Sky Airline Peru	Lima

== See also ==
- Transport in Peru
- List of airports in Peru
