= FAP Captain José Abelardo Quiñones González International Airport =

Airport in Peru

Cap. FAP José A. Quiñones González International Airport
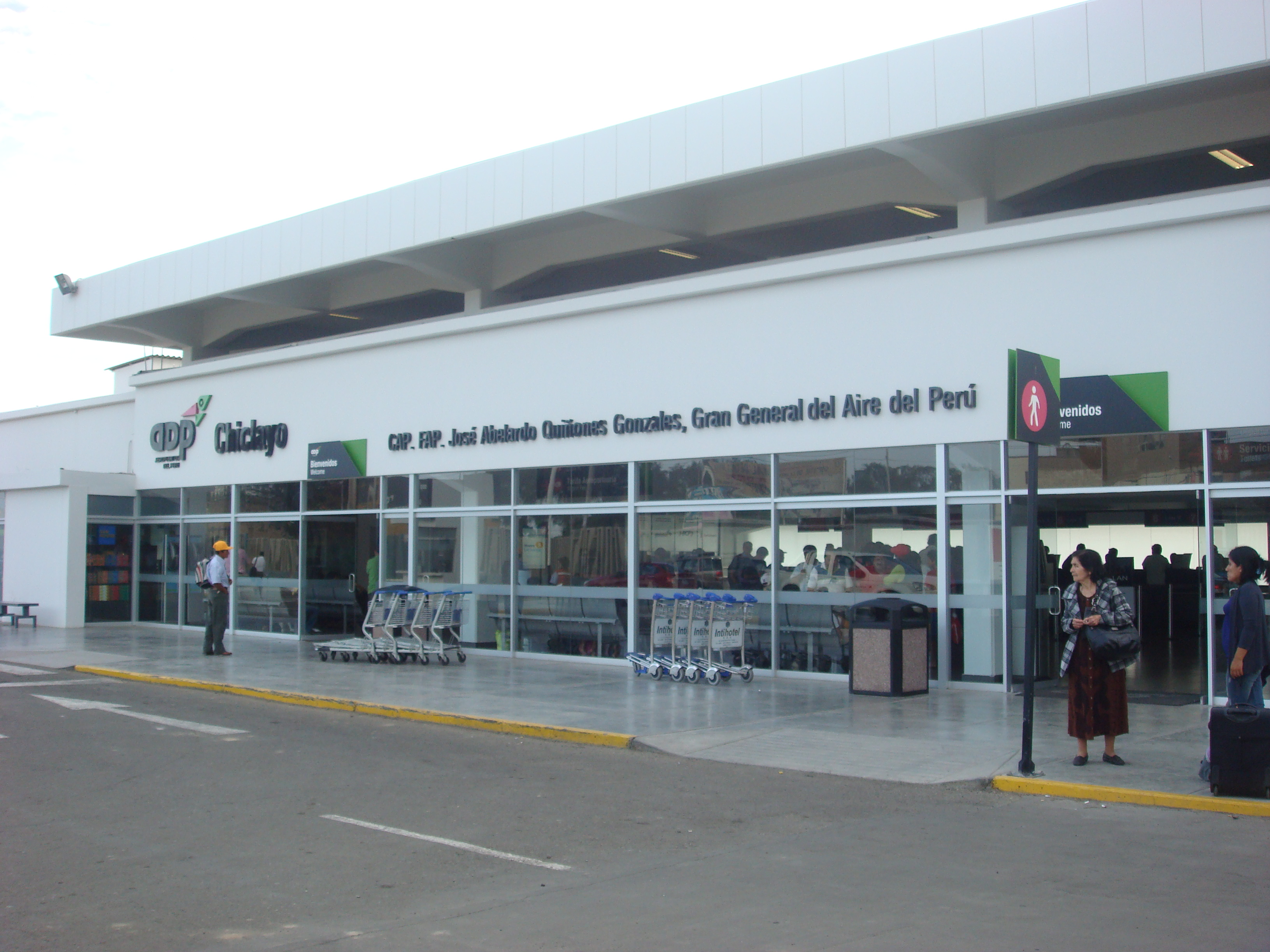
- Chiclayo Airport in Peru
- IATA: CIX; ICAO: SPHI

Summary
- Airport type: Public
- Operator: ADP
- Location: Chiclayo
- Opened: 16 April 1956; 70 years ago
- Elevation AMSL: 97 ft (30 m)
- Coordinates: 6°47′15″S 79°49′40″W

Map
- Location of the airport in Peru

Runways
Direction	Length		Surface
Direction	m	ft	Surface
01/19	2,519	8,264	Asphalt
- Sources: GCM

Capitán FAP José A. Quiñones González International Airport (IATA: CIX, ICAO: SPHI) is an airport serving Chiclayo, Peru and the surrounding metropolitan area. It is run by ADP, a private airport operator that operates various airports in northern Peru. It is the main airport of the Lambayeque Region, one of the most populous regions of Peru.

The airport is also used by the Peruvian Air Force (Spanish: Fuerza Aérea del Perú, FAP). It hosts one of the Air Force's two air superiority/interceptor squadrons, Escuadrón Aéreo 612 (Fighter Squadron 612 "Fighting Cocks"). The blast shelters house the squadron's Mig 29 aircraft, along with Cessna A-37 Dragonfly's.

The airport is named after Jose Quiñones Gonzalez, an FAP hero who was killed during the July 1941 Ecuadorian-Peruvian War.

== History ==
The airport was inaugurated on 16 April, 1956, and was elevated to the category of international airport and remodeled in March 1994. It was dominated by large airlines such as the nations flag carrier, Aeroperú, and Faucett Perú, until the beginning of the 21st century. Since March 2008, it has been operated by Aeropuertos del Perú, a private company that won the concession for the airport in 2006.

The expansion and modernization of airport was planned in 2015, with an investment exceeding 350 million soles. The works included a complete rehabilitation of the runway and a new passenger terminal. While some improvements were completed, such as the runway, lighting system, and security, the rest never fully materialized. A new proposal was brought by Copa Airlines, who opened a route to Panama City, largely motivated the airports expansion in 2019, which aimed to expand the airport to a capacity of over 2 million passengers.

== Airlines and destinations ==
Airlines	Destinations
Aeroregional	Cuenca (begins November 2026)
Copa Airlines	Panama City–Tocumen
JetSmart Perú	Lima
LATAM Perú	Lima, Quito (begins November 2026)
Sky Airline Peru	Lima (begins July 13,2026)
Star Perú	Lima, Tarapoto , Iquitos

== See also ==
- Transport in Peru
- List of airports in Peru
