= Coronel FAP Alfredo Mendívil Duarte Airport =

Airport in Peru

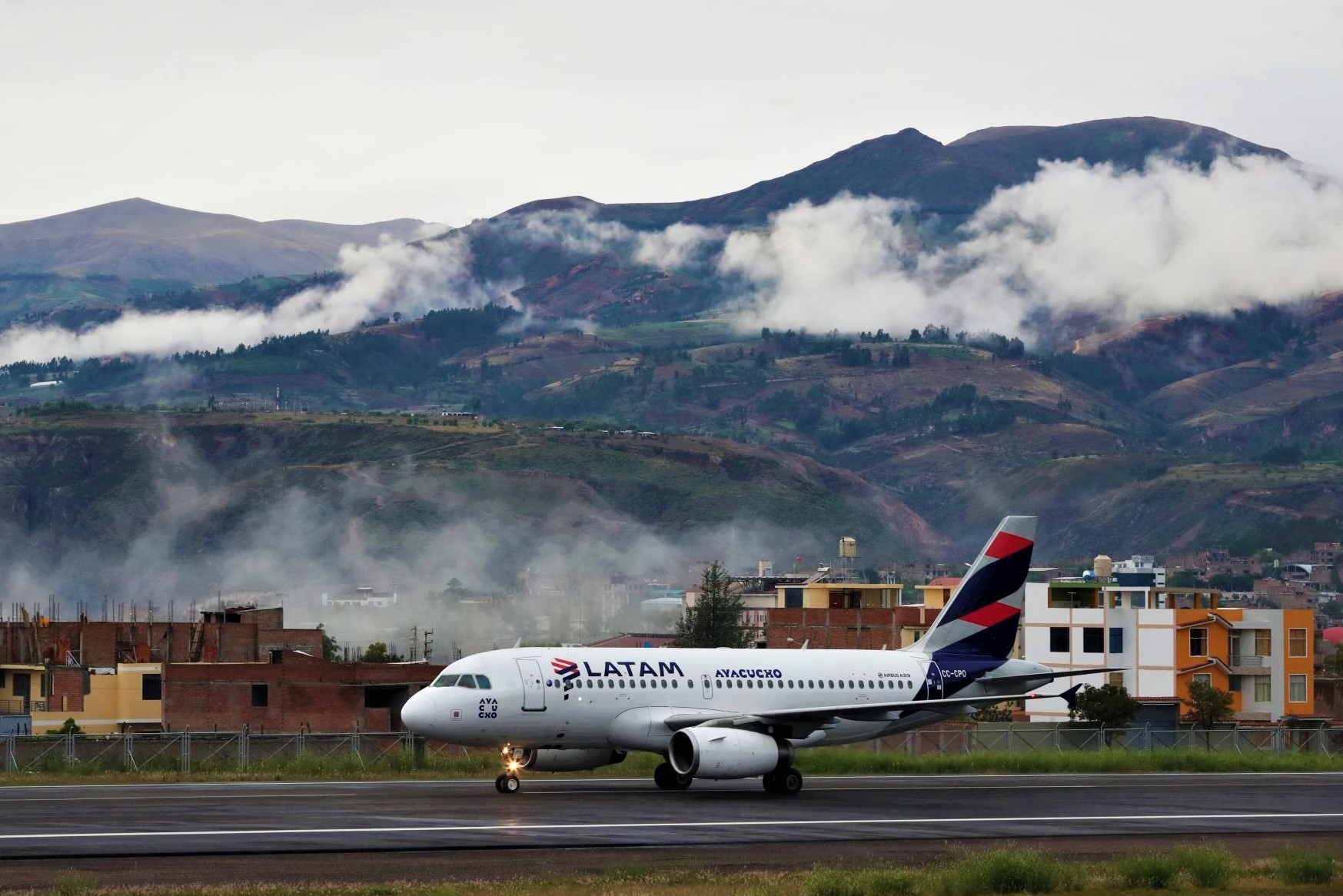
- IATA: AYP; ICAO: SPHO

Summary
- Airport type: Public
- Operator: CORPAC S.A.
- Location: Ayacucho
- Elevation AMSL: 8,917 ft / 2,718 m
- Coordinates: 13°09′15″S 74°12′15″W

Map
- Location of the airport in Peru

Runways
Direction	Length		Surface
Direction	m	ft	Surface
02/20	2,800	9,186	Asphalt
- Sources: GCM Google Maps

Coronel FAP Alfredo Mendívil Duarte Airport (IATA: AYP, ICAO: SPHO) is an airport serving Ayacucho, Peru. It is managed by CORPAC S.A. (Corporación Peruana de Aeropuertos y Aviación Comercial S.A.), a government organization that oversees Peruvian airports. It is the main airport of the Ayacucho Region, located in the south-central Andes of the country.

The runway sits on a mesa overlooking the Totorilla River, with high terrain in all quadrants.

The Ayacucho non-directional beacon (Ident: AYA) is located on the field.

== Airlines and destinations ==
Airlines	Destinations
LATAM Perú	Cusco, Lima
Sky Airline Peru	Lima

== See also ==
- Transport in Peru
- List of airports in Peru
