= Sky Airline Peru =

Peruvian airline

Sky Airline Perú
IATA	ICAO	Call sign
H8	SKX	SKY PERU
- Founded: April 2019
- Hubs: Jorge Chávez International Airport
- Frequent-flyer program: Sky Plus
- Fleet size: 16
- Destinations: 15
- Parent company: Sky Airline
- Headquarters: Lima, Peru
- Key people: Jose Raul Vargas Feldmuth
- Website: skyairline.com/peru

Sky Airline Perú, styled as SꞰY Airline Perú, is an airline based in Lima, Peru and is the second largest airline in the Peruvian market. It is a subsidiary of Sky Airline, which is based in Chile. It operates scheduled domestic and international services. Its main hub is Jorge Chávez International Airport.

== History ==
The airline was established in April 2019 as part of a planned expansion of Sky Airline in Latin America. Sky Airline Perú operations were more successful than originally anticipated, which led to the addition of more aircraft than originally projected.

== Destinations ==
As of April 2023, the airline flies to 14 destinations in Peru, and has flights to five countries from its Lima hub. The airline was set to begin flights to Sao Paulo, Brazil in July 2023.

National destinations
City	Airport code	Airport name	Departure airport	Notes
Arequipa	AQP	Rodríguez Ballón International Airport	LIM, CUZ	
Ayacucho	AYP	Coronel FAP Alfredo Mendívil Duarte Airport	LIM	
Cusco	CUZ	Alejandro Velasco Astete International Airport	LIM, AQP	
Iquitos	IQT	Coronel FAP Francisco Secada Vignetta International Airport	LIM	
Lima	LIM	Jorge Chávez International Airport		Hub
Juliaca	JUL	Inca Manco Cápac International Airport	LIM	
Piura	PIU	FAP Captain Guillermo Concha Iberico International Airport	LIM	
Pucallpa	PCL	FAP Captain David Abensur Rengifo International Airport	LIM	
Tacna	TCQ	Coronel FAP Carlos Ciriani Santa Rosa International Airport	LIM	
Tarapoto	TPP	Cadete FAP Guillermo del Castillo Paredes Airport	LIM	
Trujillo	TRU	FAP Captain Carlos Martínez de Pinillos International Airport	LIM	
Tumbes	TBP	FAP Captain Pedro Canga Rodríguez Airport	LIM	

International destinations
City	Airport code	Airport name	Departure airport	Notes
Argentina
Buenos Aires	EZE	Ministro Pistarini International Airport	LIM	
Mexico
Cancún	CUN	Cancún International Airport	LIM	
Dominican Republic
Punta Cana	PUJ	Punta Cana International Airport	LIM	
United States
Miami	MIA	Miami International Airport	LIM	
Brazil
Florianópolis	FLN	Hercílio Luz International Airport	LIM	

== Fleet ==
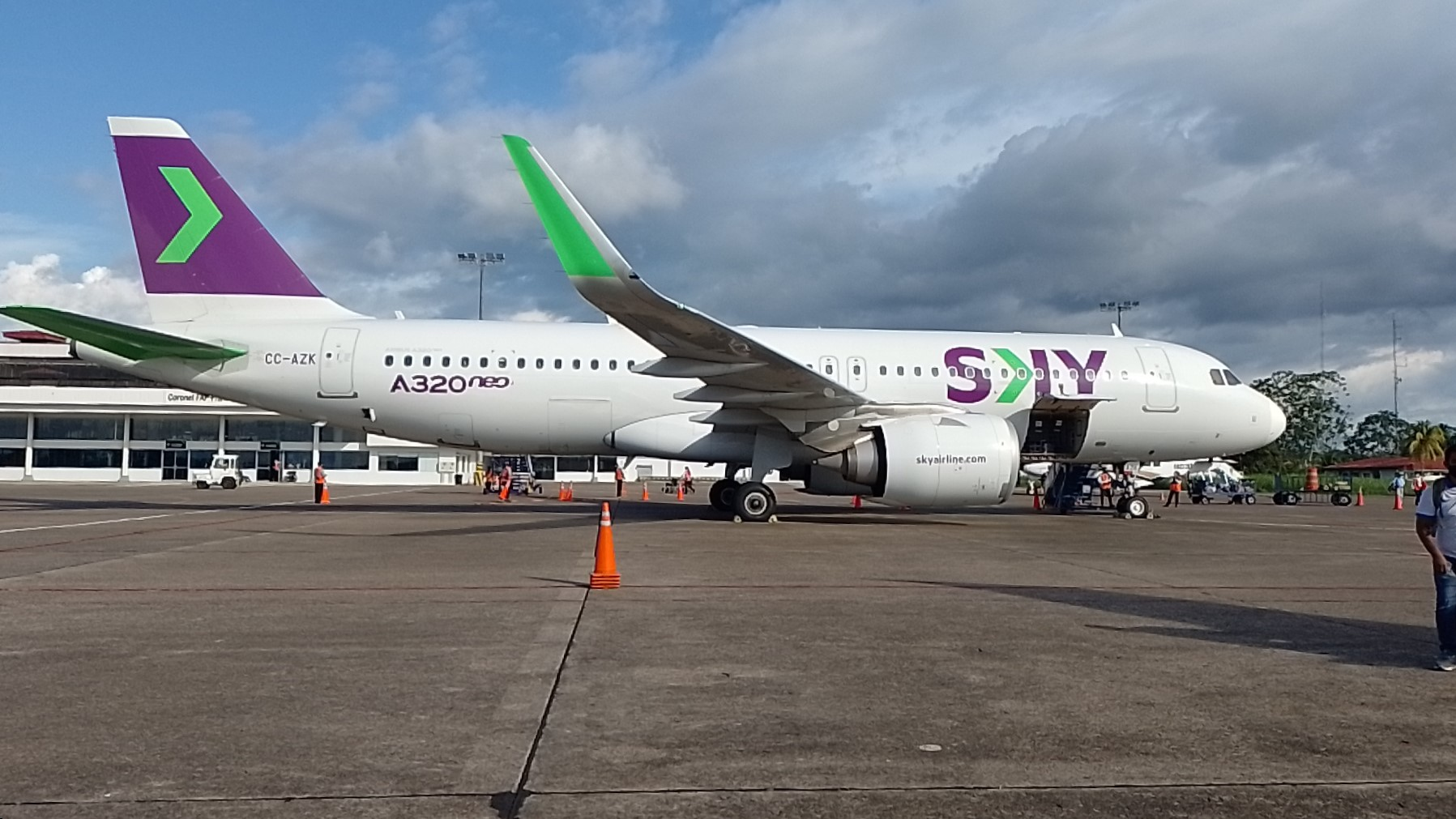
Sky Airline Perú Airbus A320neo at Iquitos Airport

As of August 2025, Sky Airline Perú operates the following aircraft:

Aircraft	In service	Orders	Passengers	Notes
Airbus A320neo	15	—		
Airbus A321neo	1	—		
Total	16	—		

All Sky Airline Perú Airbus A320neo aircraft are equipped with 186 German-made ZIM brand pre-reclining seats with one USB connector for fast charging for compatible devices. To provide more comfort for passengers on longer routes, it was announced along with the introduction of the new Lima - Cancun route that these seats will be gradually replaced by reclining Recaro seats, with telephone support and international plugs with USB connectors.
