= Mayor General FAP Armando Revoredo Iglesias Airport =

Airport in Peru

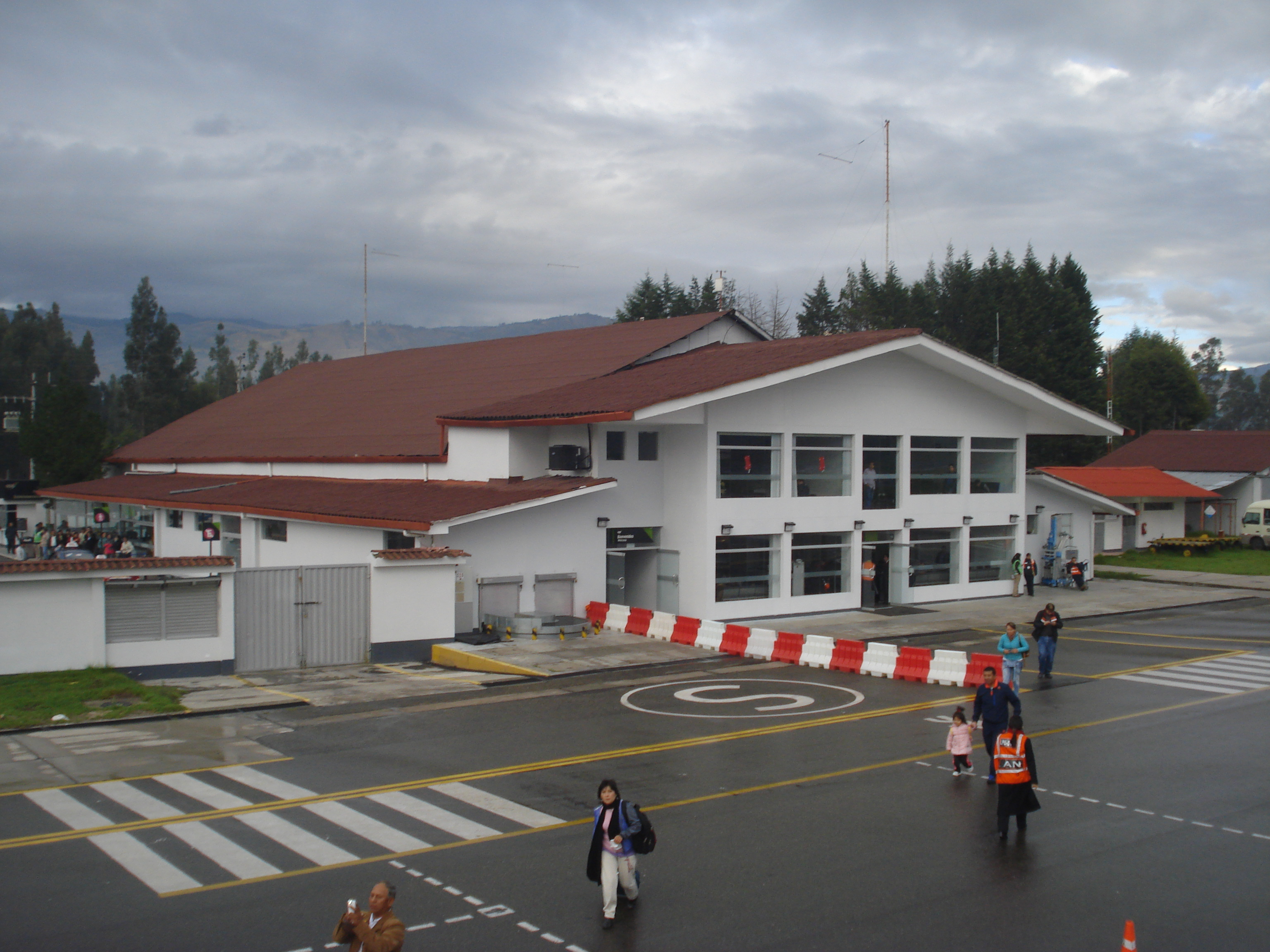
- IATA: CJA; ICAO: SPJR

Summary
- Airport type: Public
- Operator: ADP
- Serves: Cajamarca, Peru
- Elevation AMSL: 8,781 ft / 2,676 m
- Coordinates: 7°08′25″S 78°29′20″W

Map
- Location of the airport in Peru

Runways
Direction	Length		Surface
Direction	m	ft	Surface
16/34	2,500	8,202	Asphalt
- Source: WAD GCM Google Maps

Mayor General FAP Armando Revoredo Iglesias Airport (IATA: CJA, ICAO: SPJR), known in Spanish as Aeropuerto Mayor General FAP Armando Revoredo Iglesias (with Mayor General often abbreviated as My. Gral.), is an airport serving Cajamarca, capital of the Cajamarca Region in Peru. It is run by CORPAC S.A. (Corporación Peruana de Aeropuertos y Aviación Comercial S.A.), a government organization that oversees management of Peruvian airports.

The runway has high terrain to the north.

The Cajamarca non-directional beacon (Ident: MAR) is located on the field.

== Airlines and destinations ==
The following airlines serve the airport:

Airlines	Destinations
JetSmart Perú	Lima
LATAM Perú	Lima
Star Perú	Lima

== See also ==
- Transport in Peru
- List of airports in Peru
