= Padre Aldamiz International Airport =

Small airport in the Peruvian city of Puerto Maldonado

Padre Aldamiz International Airport Puerto Maldonado International Airport
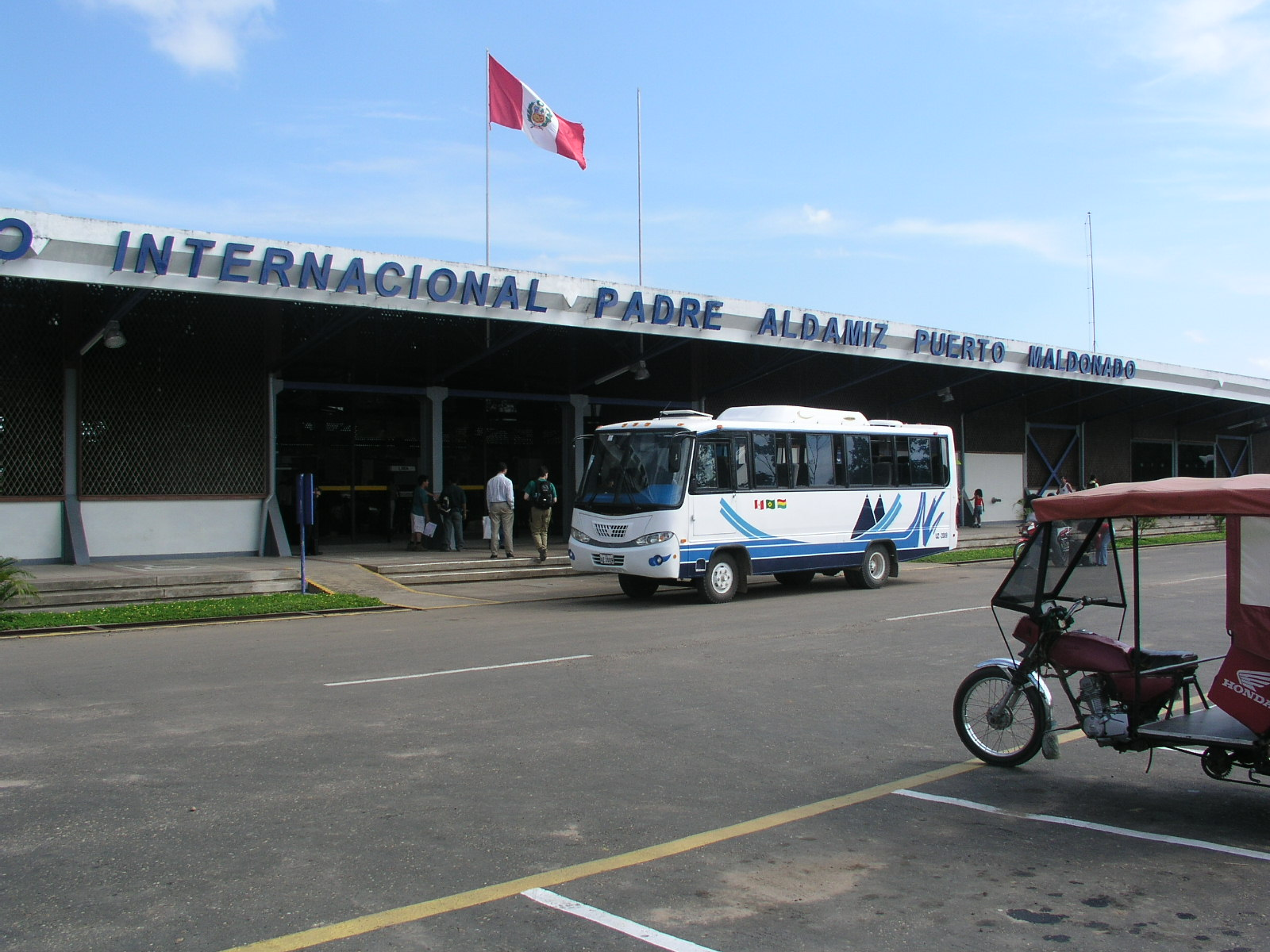
- IATA: PEM; ICAO: SPTU

Summary
- Airport type: Military/Public
- Operator: CORPAC S.A.
- Location: Puerto Maldonado
- Elevation AMSL: 659 ft (201 m)
- Coordinates: 12°36′49″S 69°13′43″W

Map
- Location of the airport in Peru

Runways
Direction	Length		Surface
Direction	m	ft	Surface
01/19	3,510	11,516	Concrete
- Sources: GCM Google Maps

Padre Aldamiz International Airport (IATA: PEM, ICAO: SPTU), also known as Puerto Maldonado International Airport, is an airport serving the city of Puerto Maldonado in the Madre de Dios Region of Peru.

Padre Aldamiz International Airport is near some of Peru's noted ecological areas, such as the national jungle reserve of Tambopata-Candamo. Padre Aldamiz International Airport benefits mostly from one type of traveler, ecology tourists. Western doctors often warn that airport authorities require travelers to carry documentation informing about yellow fever vaccination because of its rainforest location.

The airport was served by Peru's national airline, AeroPerú. AeroPerú ceased operations in 1999, and, subsequently, other airlines have entered the Lima to Puerto Maldonado air route. Nuevo Continente made an attempt in 2004, but that airline suspended operations amid allegations of drug trafficking by their owners. It was later served by LAN Perú and TACA Perú. The former continues to serve the route as LATAM Perú. LATAM Perú also flies to Puerto Maldonado from Cuzco, a route in which they were joined in 2025 by Sky Airline Peru.

The Peruvian Air Force flew in the past Boeing 707 jets to Padre Aldamiz International Airport on cargo operations. The airport can handle landings by different types of jets. For example, LATAM Perú uses Airbus A320 family aircraft.

== Airlines and destinations ==
Airlines	Destinations
LATAM Perú	Cusco, Lima
Sky Airline Peru	Cusco

== See also ==
- Transport in Peru
- List of airports in Peru
