= Capitán FAP Carlos Martínez de Pinillos International Airport =

Airport in Trujillo, Peru

FAP Captain Carlos Martínez de Pinillos International Airport
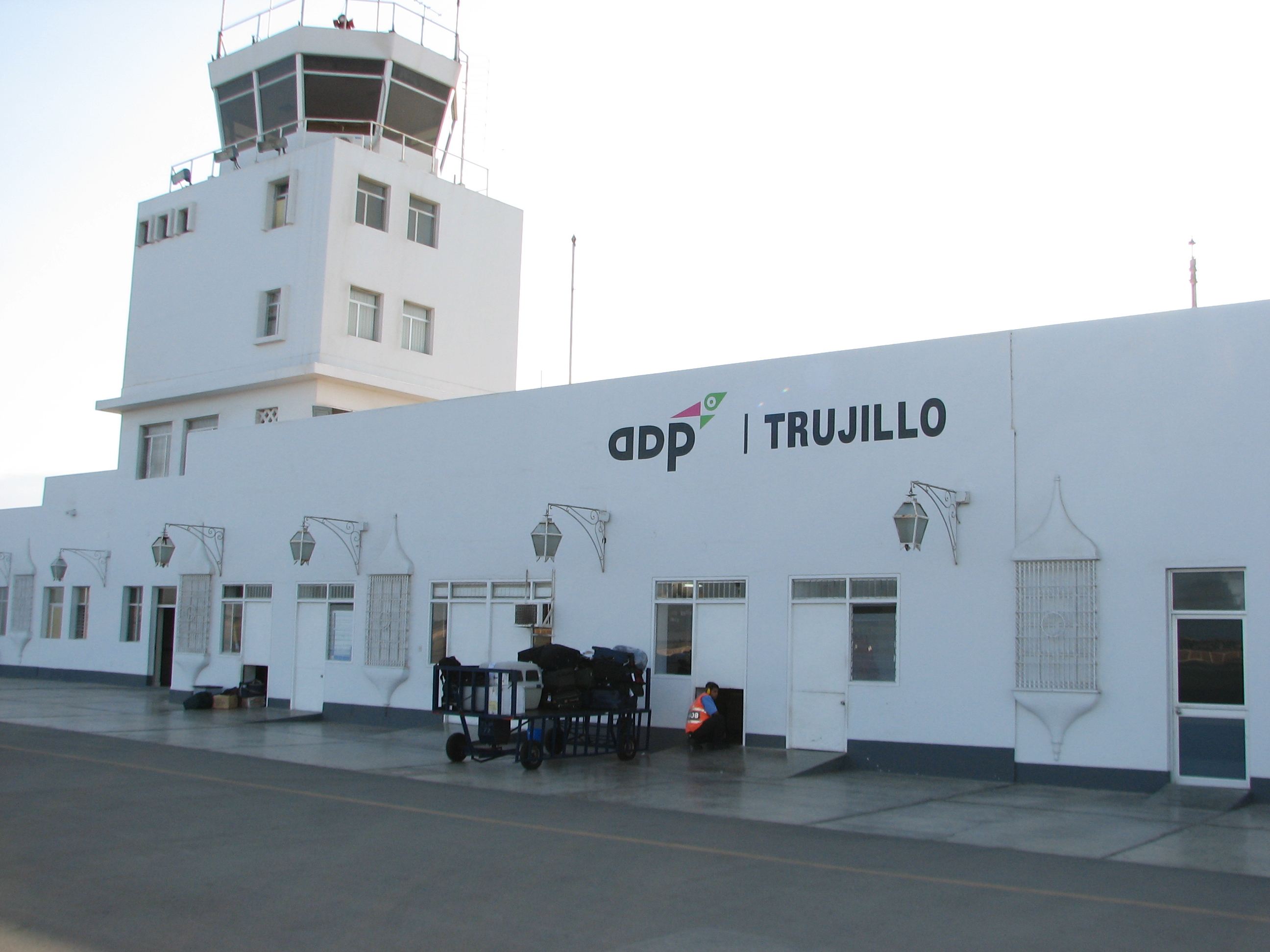
- IATA: TRU; ICAO: SPRU

Summary
- Airport type: Public
- Operator: ADP
- Serves: Trujillo
- Location: Trujillo, Peru
- Elevation AMSL: 128 ft (39 m)
- Coordinates: 8°4′50″S 79°6′30″W

Map
- Location of the airport in Peru

Runways
Direction	Length		Surface
Direction	m	ft	Surface
02/20	3,024	9,921	Asphalt

Statistics (2016)
- Passengers: 560,922
- Sources: Aero Data, GCM

FAP Captain Carlos Martínez de Pinillos International Airport (IATA: TRU, ICAO: SPRU), known as Aeropuerto Internacional Capitán FAP Carlos Martínez de Pinillos in Spanish, is an airport serving Peru's third largest city, Trujillo, as well as the beach community of Huanchaco. It is the main air hub in northern Peru.

== Airlines and destinations ==
Scheduled passenger service is offered by the following airlines for the cited destinations:

Airlines	Destinations
JetSmart Chile	Santiago de Chile
JetSmart Perú	Lima
LATAM Perú	Lima
Sky Airline Peru	Lima

== See also ==
- Transport in Peru
- List of airports in Peru
