= FAP Captain David Abensur Rengifo International Airport =

Airport in Pucallpa, Coronel Portillo, Ucayali, Peru

FAP Captain David Abensur Rengifo International Airport Captain Rolden International Airport
- IATA: PCL; ICAO: SPCL

Summary
- Airport type: Public
- Operator: ADP
- Location: Pucallpa
- Elevation AMSL: 516 ft (157 m)
- Coordinates: 8°22′40″S 74°34′27″W

Map
- Location of the airport in Peru

Runways
| Direction | Length | | Surface |
| Direction | m | ft | Surface |
|---|---|---|---|
| 02/20 | 2,800 | 9,186 | Asphalt |
- Sources: GCM

FAP Captain David Abensur Rengifo International Airport (IATA: PCL, ICAO: SPCL) (Spanish: Aeropuerto Internacional Capitán FAP David Abensur Rengifo) (also known as Captain Rolden International Airport) is an airport serving the city of Pucallpa in the Ucayali Region of Peru. It is operated by Aeropuertos del Perú, S.A. Captain Rengifo Airport is the main airport serving the Ucayali Region.

== Name ==
The airport is named in honor of Peruvian Air Force Captain David Abensur Rengifo, a cargo pilot and Pucallpa native who was killed in the crash of a FAP L-100-20 Hercules (reg. FAP-383) on 9 June 1983, when the plane was going to land in Puerto Maldonado Airport, in the southern Peruvian Amazon jungle.

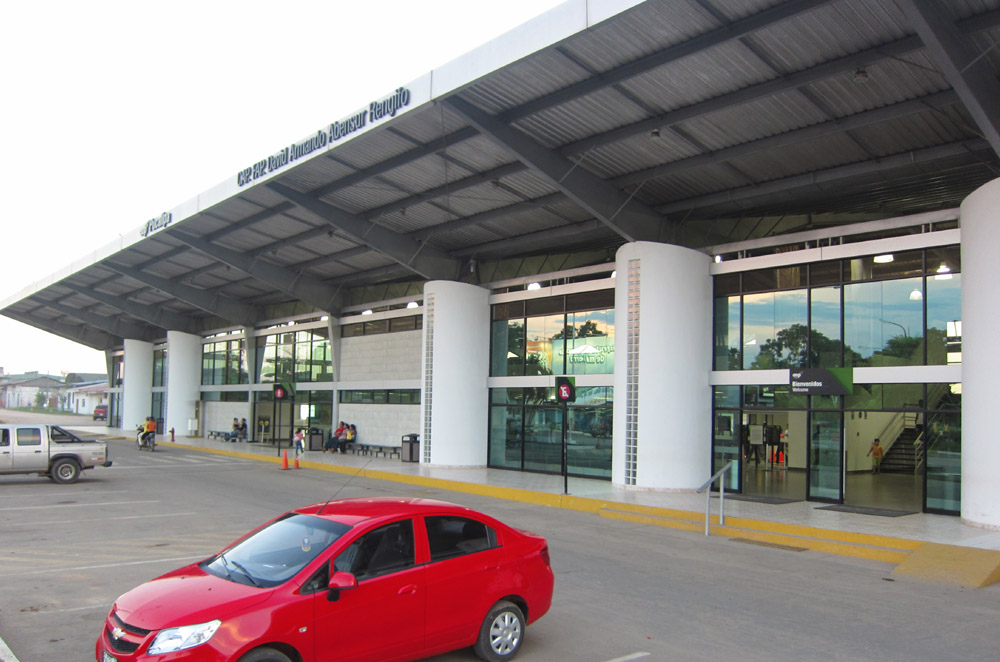
View of Pucallpa Airport terminal

== Airlines and destinations ==
Airlines serving the airport include:

| Airlines | Destinations |
|---|---|
| LATAM Perú | Lima |
| Sky Airline Peru | Lima |
| Star Perú | Iquitos, Lima |

Air Majoro also provides air ambulance services to Amazon towns in the region.

== Incidents and accidents ==
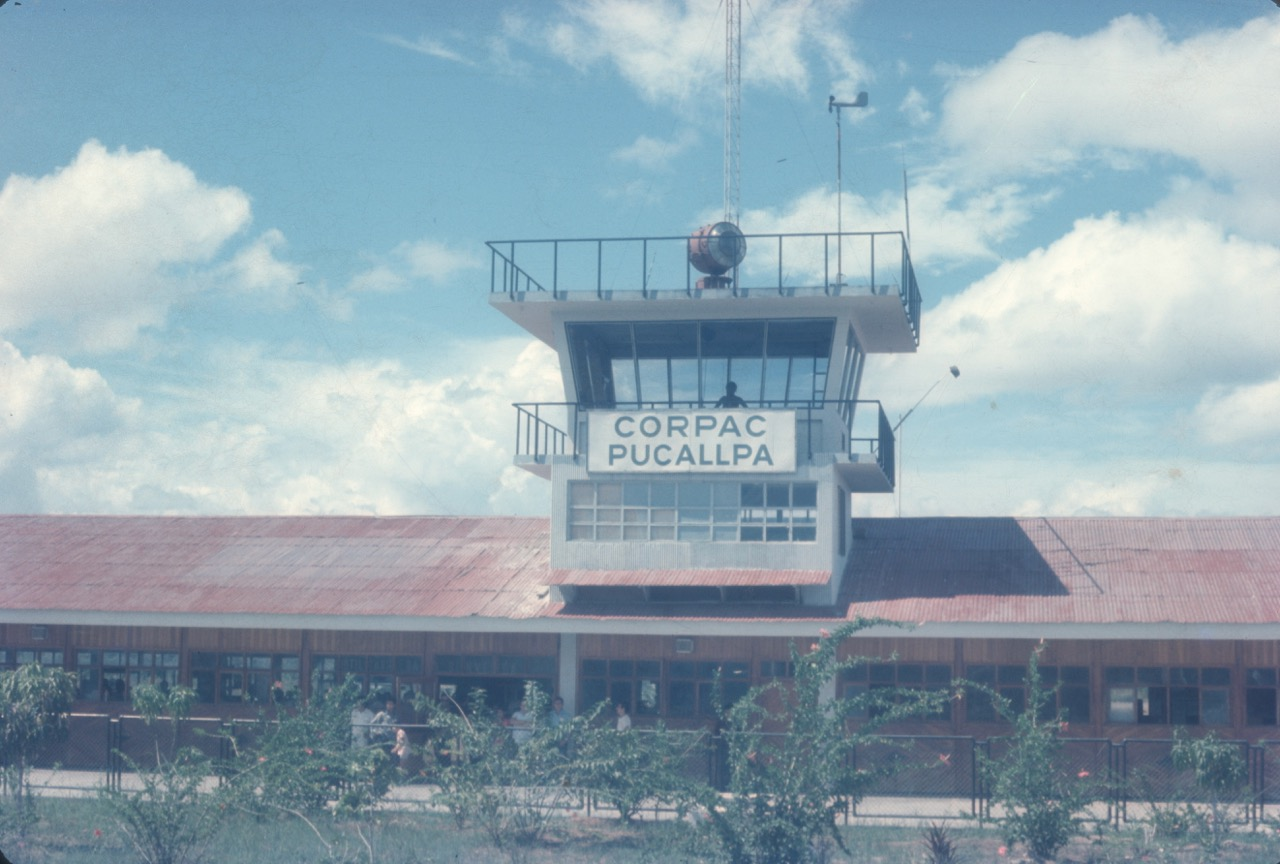
Pucallpa airport in 1974.

On 23 August 2005, TANS Perú Flight 204, a Boeing 737, attempting to land in heavy cumulus clouds, and a severe hailstorm crashed short of the runway at Pucallpa Airport. Out of the 98 passengers and crew on board, 40 were killed.

== See also ==
- Transport in Peru
- List of airports in Peru
