= FAP Captain Pedro Canga Rodríguez Airport =

Airport in Peru

Cap. FAP Pedro Canga Rodríguez Airport
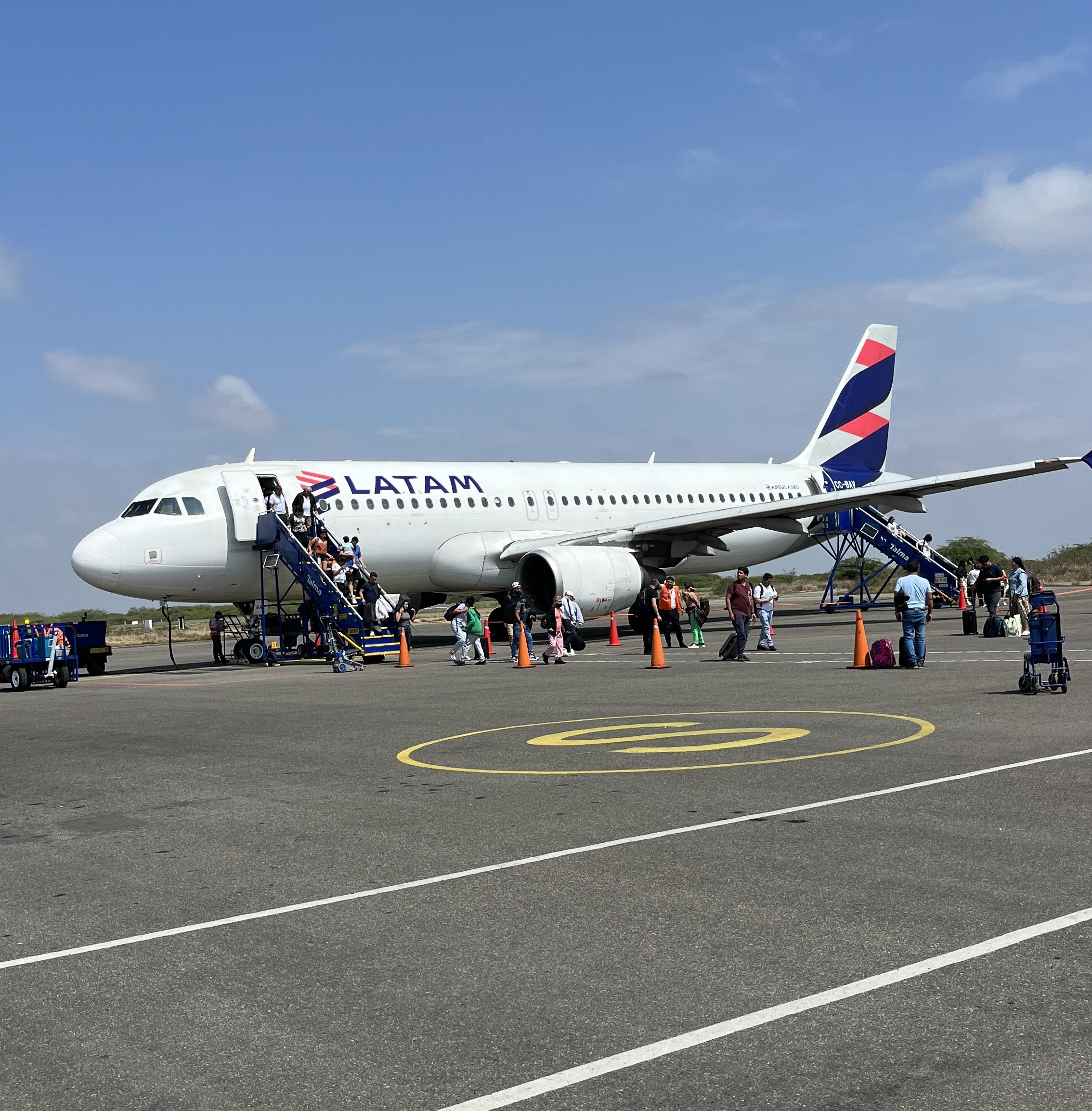
- A recently-arrived flight from Lima on the Tarmac at TBP in December 2023
- IATA: TBP; ICAO: SPME

Summary
- Airport type: Public
- Operator: ADP
- Serves: Tumbes, Peru
- Elevation AMSL: 115 ft / 35 m
- Coordinates: 3°33′05″S 80°22′55″W

Map
- Location of airport in Peru

Runways
| Direction | Length | | Surface |
| Direction | m | ft | Surface |
|---|---|---|---|
| 14/32 | 2,500 | 8,202 | Asphalt |
- Sources: GCM SkyVector

Capitán FAP Pedro Canga Rodríguez Airport (IATA: TBP, ICAO: SPME) is an airport serving Tumbes, Peru. It is the main airport of the Tumbes Region, and is run by CORPAC S.A. (Corporación Peruana de Aeropuertos y Aviación Comercial S.A.), a government organization that manages Peruvian airports. The airport is used mainly by locals and national and international travelers because of its proximity to beaches and resorts.

== Airlines and destinations ==
| Airlines | Destinations |
|---|---|
| LATAM Perú | Lima |
| Sky Airline Peru | Lima |

== See also ==
- Transport in Peru
- List of airports in Peru
