= Inca Manco Cápac International Airport =

Airport in Peru

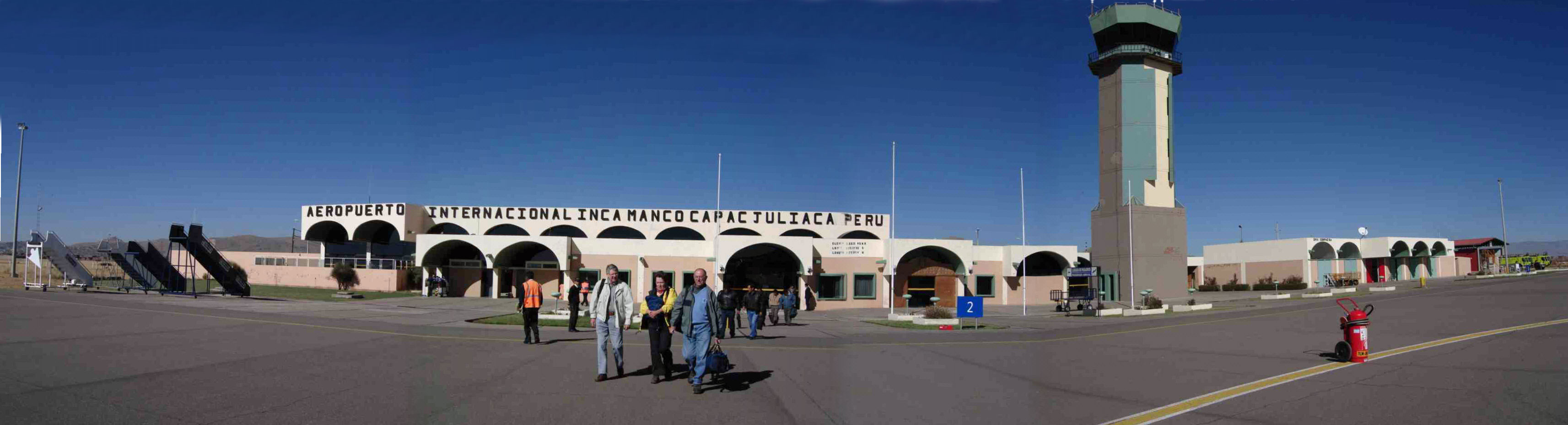
- IATA: JUL; ICAO: SPJL

Summary
- Airport type: Public
- Operator: CORPAC S.A.
- Location: Juliaca
- Elevation AMSL: 12,552 ft / 3,826 m
- Coordinates: 15°28′00″S 70°09′30″W

Map
- Location of the airport in Peru

Runways
Direction	Length		Surface
Direction	m	ft	Surface
12/30	4,200	13,780	Asphalt
- Sources: GCM Google Maps

Inca Manco Cápac International Airport (IATA: JUL, ICAO: SPJL), known as Aeropuerto Internacional Inca Manco Cápac in Spanish, is an extremely high elevation airport serving in the city of Juliaca in Peru, 32 kilometres (20 mi) west of Titicaca Lake. Airport operations are run by Corporación Peruana de Aeropuertos y Aviación Comercial S.A. (CORPAC), a government entity that oversees management of Peruvian airports. Despite being classified as international, the airport does not feature any scheduled international nonstop flights. The airport has one of the longest runways in Latin America and the longest in Peru.

The airport was named after Inca Manco Cápac, founder of the Inca civilization in Cusco.

== Airlines and destinations ==
The airport is currently served by the following airlines:

Airlines	Destinations
LATAM Perú	Lima
Sky Airline Peru	Lima

== See also ==
- Transport in Peru
- List of airports in Peru
- List of highest commercial airports
