= Cadete FAP Guillermo del Castillo Paredes Airport =

Airport in Peru

Cad. FAP Guillermo del Castillo Paredes Airport
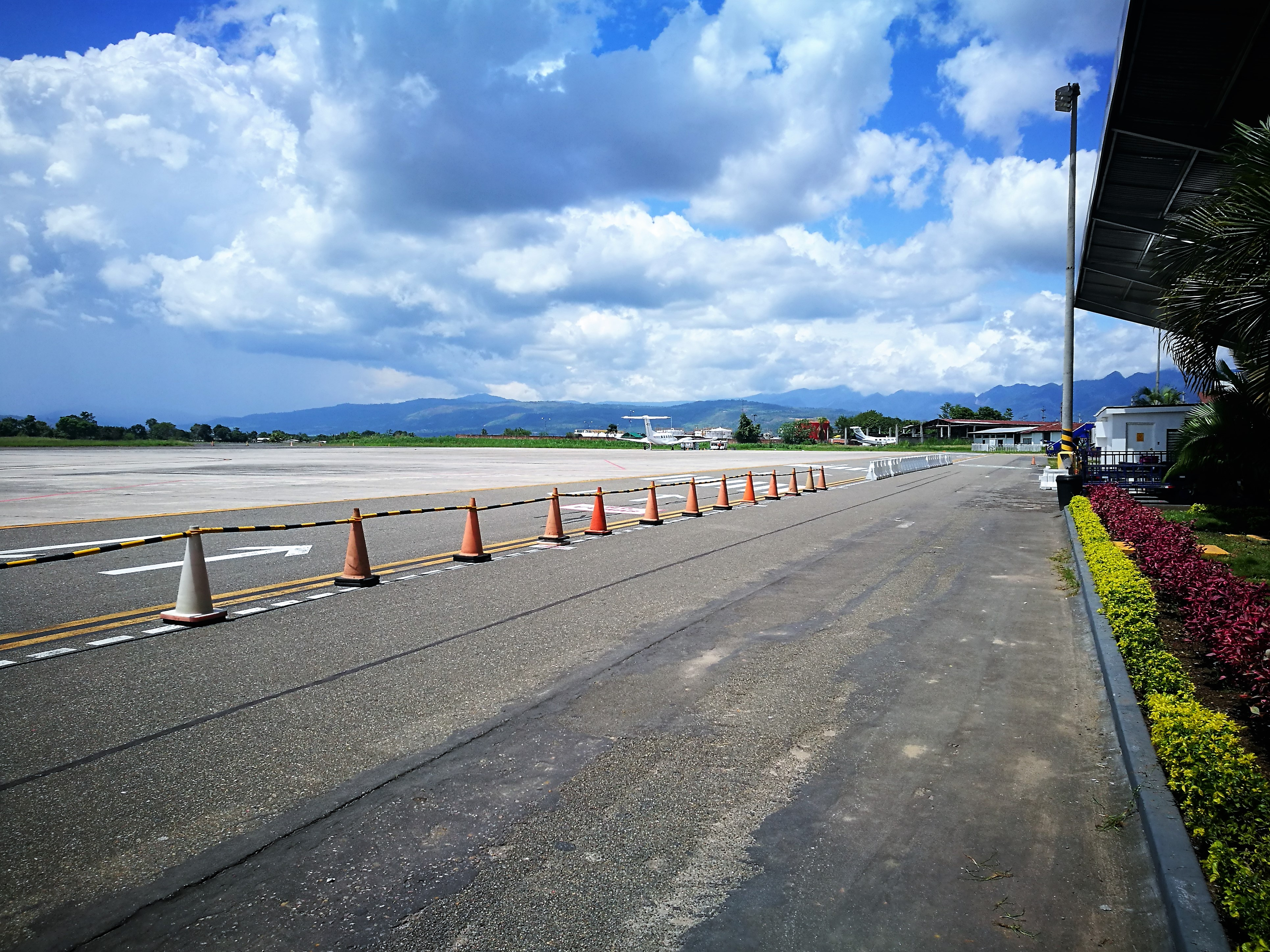
- IATA: TPP; ICAO: SPST

Summary
- Airport type: Public
- Operator: ADP
- Location: Tarapoto
- Elevation AMSL: 868 ft / 265 m
- Coordinates: 6°30′30″S 76°22′25″W

Map
- Location of the airport in Peru

Runways
Direction	Length		Surface
Direction	m	ft	Surface
17/35	2,255	7,398	Asphalt
- Sources: GCM

Cadete FAP Guillermo del Castillo Paredes Airport (IATA: TPP, ICAO: SPST) is a public airport serving Tarapoto, Peru. It is owned by CORPAC S.A, a government organization that oversees the management of Peruvian airports, but it is run by Aeropuertos del Perú (ADP) S.A, as a concession. It is the main airport of the San Martín Region, located in the Amazon, and is used by many tourists as a jumping-off point for trips into the jungle.

== Airlines and destinations ==
Airlines	Destinations
JetSmart Perú	Lima
LATAM Perú	Lima
Sky Airline Peru	Lima
Star Perú	Chiclayo, Iquitos, Lima
Saeta Peru	Charter: Rodriguez de Mendoza, Pucallpa

== See also ==
- Transport in Peru
- List of airports in Peru
