= PAF Captain Guillermo Concha Iberico International Airport =

Airport in Peru

PAF Captain Guillermo Concha Iberico International Airport Aeropuerto Internacional Capitán FAP Guillermo Concha Iberico
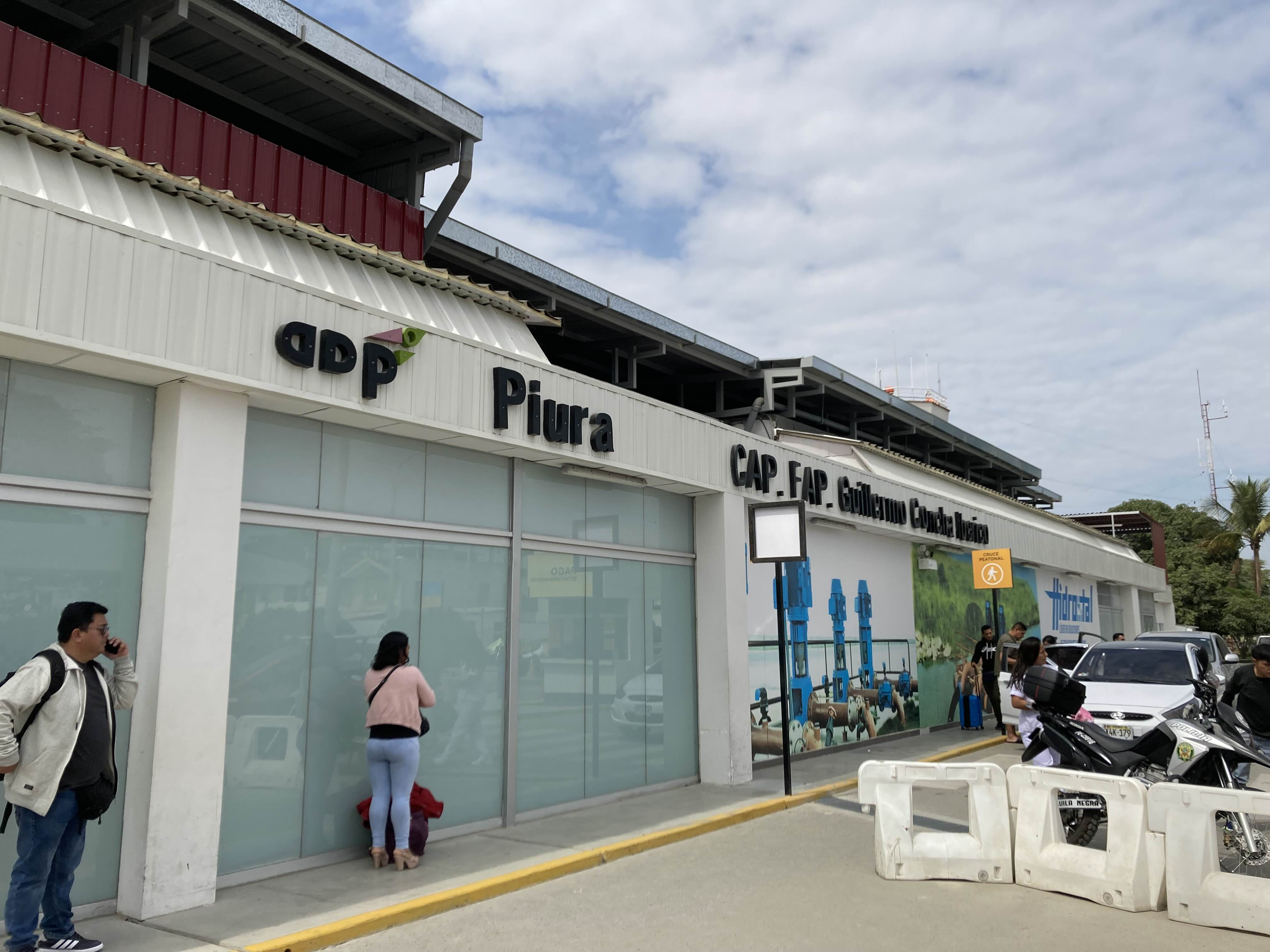
- IATA: PIU; ICAO: SPUR

Summary
- Airport type: Public
- Owner: CORPAC
- Operator: AdP
- Serves: Piura
- Location: Castilla District, Piura, Peru
- Elevation AMSL: 116 ft (35 m)
- Coordinates: 5°12′20″S 80°37′00″W
- Website: adp.com.pe

Map
- Location of the airport in Peru

Runways
| Direction | Length | | Surface |
| Direction | m | ft | Surface |
|---|---|---|---|
| 01/19 | 2,500 | 8,202 | Asphalt |
- Sources: GCM

PAF Captain Guillermo Concha Iberico International Airport (IATA: PIU, ICAO: SPUR) is an airport serving Piura, Peru. It is 2 kilometres (1.2 mi) from Piura's main square and 130 kilometres (81 mi) from the resort of Máncora. It is the main airport of the department of Piura, the second most populous of Peru's regions.

The airport is run by Aeropuertos del Perú (AdP), a private operator that manages various airports in northern Peru. It is served by JetSmart, LATAM Perú and Sky Airline.

== Airlines and destinations ==
| Airlines | Destinations |
|---|---|
| JetSmart Perú | Lima |
| LATAM Perú | Lima |
| Sky Airline Peru | Lima |

== Incidents and accidents ==
- On March 28, 1998 a Peruvian Air Force Antonov 32 carrying the dual civil/military registration OB-1389/FAP-388 and inbound from Tumbes evacuating 50 people stranded by El Niño-driven floods had an engine failure while approaching Piura. As the aircraft was overloaded, the pilot could not maintain altitude, and the plane struck three houses of a nearby shantytown and crashed into a canal. While the crew of five survived, 21 passengers and one person on the ground died.
- On 20 September 2005, an Air Rum L1011 carrying Gambian football fans heading for Lima, Peru faked a fuel starvation emergency so that the flight had to divert to Piura. The fans were going to support their national team playing in Piura for the 2005 FIFA U-17 World Championship.

== See also ==
- Transport in Peru
- List of airports in Peru
