= Coronel FAP Francisco Secada Vignetta International Airport =

Crnl. FAP Francisco Secada Vignetta International Airport
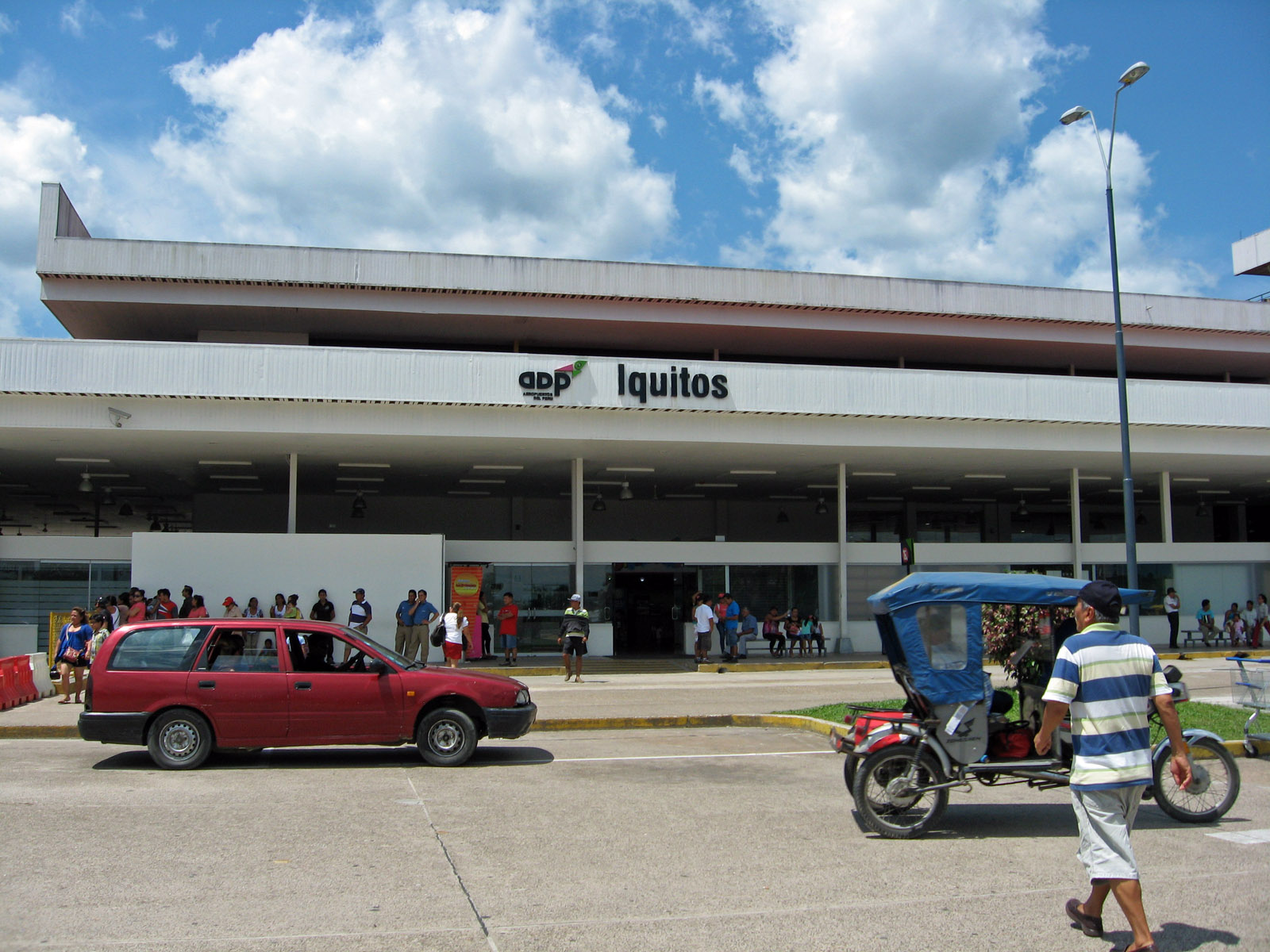
- IATA: IQT; ICAO: SPQT

Summary
- Airport type: Public
- Operator: ADP
- Serves: Iquitos
- Location: Iquitos, Peru
- Hub for: Star Perú
- Elevation AMSL: 306 ft (93 m)
- Coordinates: 3°47′05″S 73°18′30″W

Map
- Location of the airport in Peru

Runways
Direction	Length		Surface
Direction	m	ft	Surface
06/24	2,500	8,202	Asphalt

Statistics (2015)
- Passengers: 999,373
- Sources: GCM

Coronel (Crnl.) FAP Francisco Secada Vignetta International Airport (IATA: IQT, ICAO: SPQT) is an airport serving Iquitos, capital of Loreto Region and Peru's fifth largest city. It is also known as Iquitos International Airport, and is one of the main airports in Peru.

It is located 7 km (4 miles) to the southeast of the center of Iquitos. It has a single runway 2,500 m (8,202 ft) in length. It is the only airport in Amazonia with the ISO9001 stamp. The airport plays a particularly important logistical and economic role because the city of Iquitos is only accessible by air or by river. Iquitos and Pucallpa are the main air hubs in the Peruvian Amazon.

== History ==
The current airport replaced the older Lieutenant Bergerie airport in downtown Iquitos in 1979. In 1973, took its current name in commemoration Peruvian Air Force pilot Colonel Francisco Secada Vignetta (1900-1972), an Iquitos native who made his name in the 1932-33 war with Colombia. Secada flew reconnaissance and bombing sorties in said conflict, usually flying Vought O2U Corsair biplanes and, in February 1933, was credited with downing a Colombian plane during a dogfight.

It is currently administered by Aeropuertos del Perú, which was given the concession in 2006; and serves more than 1 million passengers per year, making it the fourth busiest airport in Peru, after those of Lima, Cusco and Arequipa. It is served by airlines such as JetSmart Perú, LATAM Perú, Sky Airline, Star Perú and SAETA, receiving commercial flights daily from Lima, as well as flights to and from Pucallpa and Tarapoto. There are also various connections to smaller towns and communities in the jungle.

== Airlines and destinations ==
=== Passenger ===
The airport is served by the following airlines:

Airlines	Destinations
LATAM Perú	Lima
Sky Airline Peru	Lima
Star Perú	Lima, Pucallpa, Tarapoto

=== Cargo ===
Airlines	Destinations
AerCaribe	Lima

== Incidents and accidents ==
- 12 September 1980 - A DC-8-33F, registration N715UA and operated by Aeronaves del Peru, crashed due to weather-influenced low visibility, which led the crew to fail to realize that the plane's altitude was insufficient; the airplane struck trees and impacted the ground a few kilometers from the runway threshold. All three occupants were killed.
- 3 April 1989 – A Faucett Perú Boeing 737-200 registered as OB-R-1314 veered off the runway and lost its second (right) engine after failing to stop while landing during a heavy tropical rainstorm. There were no fatalities among the 130 passengers and crew, but 14 people were injured, and the aircraft was destroyed in an ensuing fire.
- 10 August 1989 - An APISA Air Cargo DC-8-33F, registration OB-1316, also suffered a runway excursion during landing in heavy rain. Repair work was carried out on the plane, but it did not fly again.
- 4 April 1995, a TANS Harbin Y-12-II, registration OB-1498, crashed due to a stall shortly after takeoff for a training mission, killing all three on board.
- 14 October 2020 - An AerCaribe Peru Antonov An-32 veered off the runway, ripping off the wings and landing gear, starting a fire. All the crew members survived, but the aircraft was written off.

== See also ==
- Transport in Peru
- List of airports in Peru
