= Peruvian Airlines =

Peruvian airline (2009–2019)

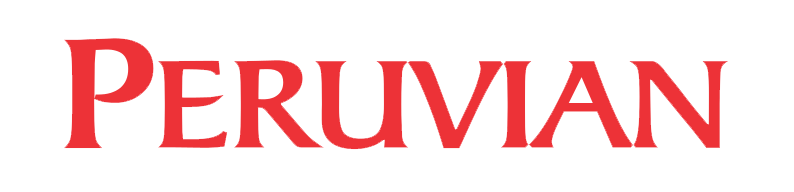
IATA	ICAO	Call sign
P9	PVN	PERUVIAN
- Founded: November 2007
- Commenced operations: October 29, 2009
- Ceased operations: October 2, 2019
- Hubs: Jorge Chávez International Airport
- Frequent-flyer program: Peruvian Pass
- Fleet size: 9
- Destinations: 10
- Headquarters: Lima, Peru
- Key people: Alberto Lopez Bustillo (General Manager)
- Website: www.peruvian.pe/home/world/

Peruvian Air Line S.A. was a Peruvian airline based in Lima, from 2009 to 2019.The airline offered primarily domestic flights out of its main base at Jorge Chávez International Airport. On October 2, 2019, the airline ceased all operations due to liquidity issues.

== History ==
Peruvian Airlines was founded in November 2007, receiving its air operator's certificate from Peru's aviation authority on August 7, 2008. The airline commenced operations on October 29, 2009.

In July 2018, at Farnborough Airshow, Peruvian Airlines made public plans to create a subsidiary named Aero Perù that was to commence operations in 2020.

The airline ceased operations on October 2, 2019, due to the Peruvian Customs Tax Court seizing the airline's bank accounts after the airline failed to complete fuel payments.

== Destinations ==
The former logo used 2007-2016

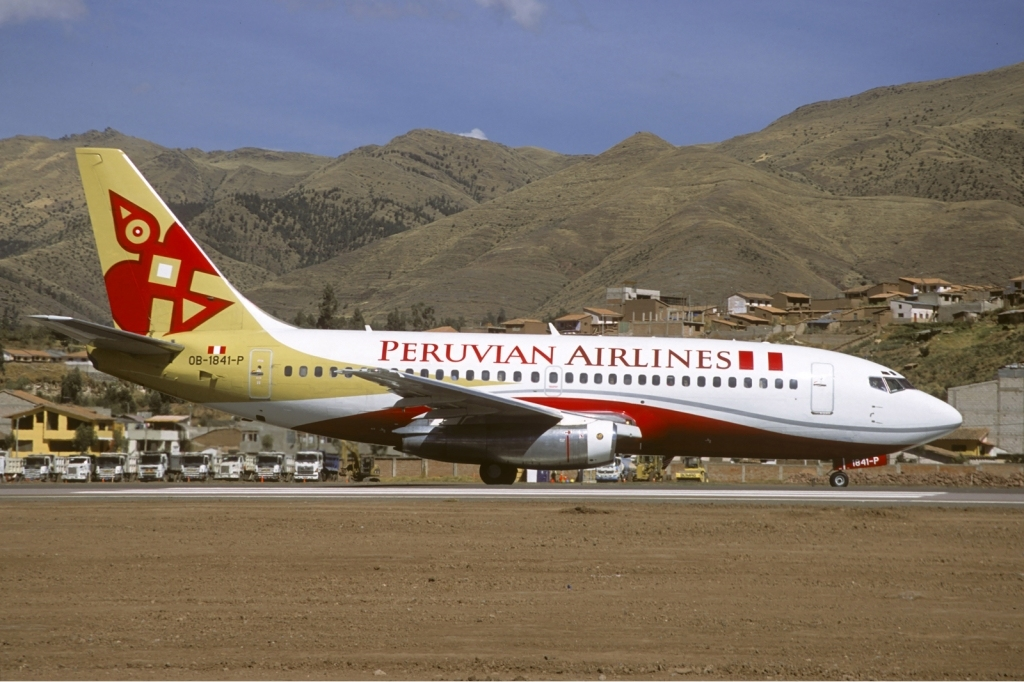
A Peruvian Airlines Boeing 737-200 in the former livery

Peruvian Airlines served the following destinations (as of July 2018):

Country	City	Airport	Notes
Bolivia	La Paz	El Alto International Airport	Terminated
Peru	Arequipa	Rodríguez Ballón International Airport	
Peru	Cusco	Alejandro Velasco Astete International Airport	
Peru	Ilo	Ilo Airport	
Peru	Iquitos	Coronel FAP Francisco Secada Vignetta International Airport	
Peru	Jauja	Francisco Carle Airport	
Peru	Lima	Jorge Chávez International Airport	Hub
Peru	Piura	PAF Captain Guillermo Concha Iberico International Airport	
Peru	Pucallpa	FAP Captain David Abensur Rengifo International Airport	
Peru	Tacna	Coronel FAP Carlos Ciriani Santa Rosa International Airport	
Peru	Tarapoto	Cadete FAP Guillermo del Castillo Paredes Airport	
Peru	Tumbes	FAP Captain Pedro Canga Rodríguez Airport	Terminated

== Codeshare agreements ==
Peruvian maintained codeshare agreements with the following airlines:

- Aerolíneas Argentinas
- Copa Airlines
- Star Perú

== Fleet ==
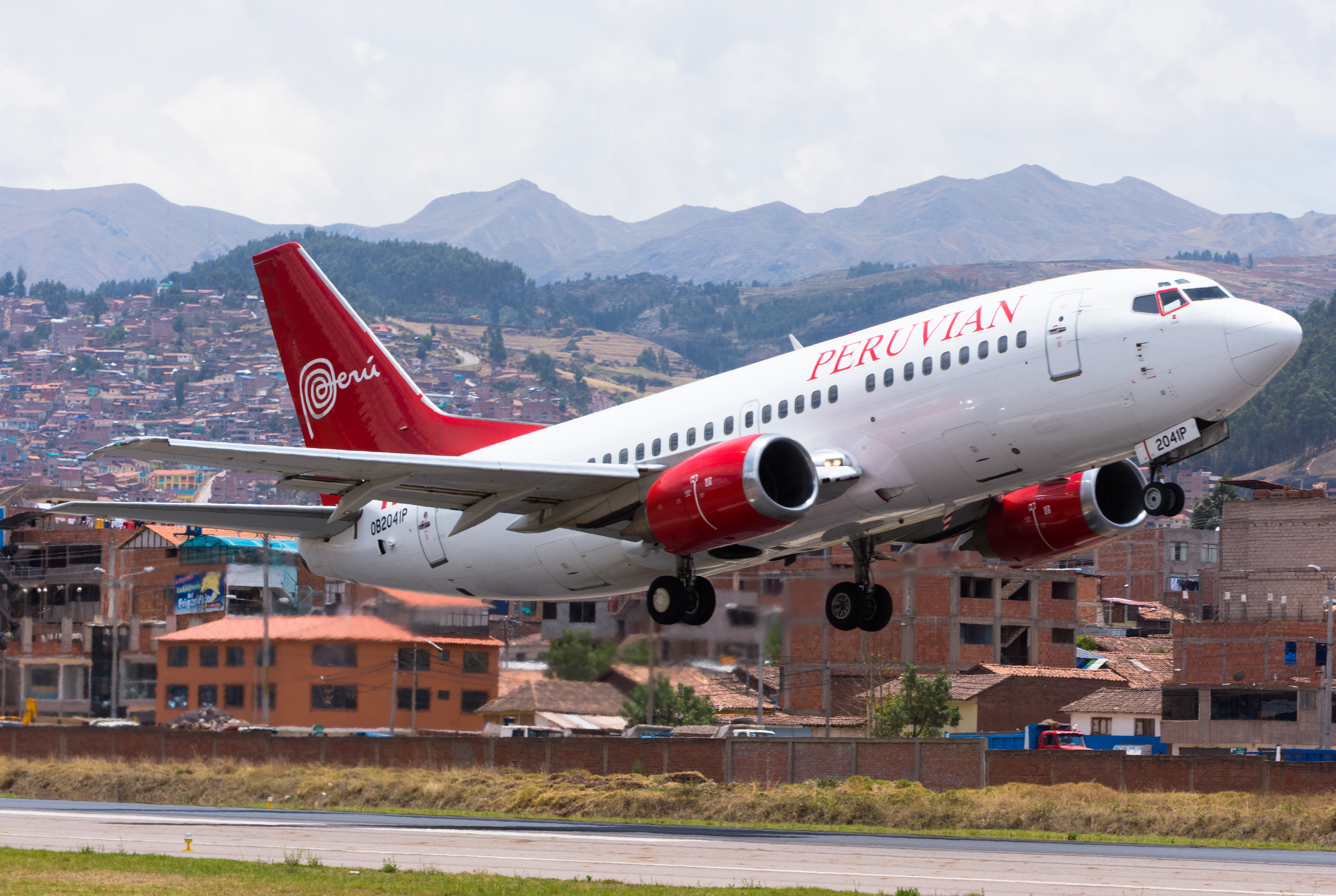
A Peruvian Airlines Boeing 737-500.

=== Final fleet ===
As of September 2019, Peruvian Airlines active fleet consisted of the following aircraft:

Peruvian Airlines fleet
Aircraft	In service	Orders	Passengers	Notes
Boeing 737-300	4	—	143	
Boeing 737-400	1	—	176	Leased to Sunrise Airways
Boeing 737-500	4	—	120	
Irkut MC-21	—	10	N/A	Not confirmed if operated by Peruvian or future subsidiary Aero Perú
Sukhoi Superjet 100	—	10	N/A	Not confirmed if operated by Peruvian or future subsidiary Aero Perú
Total	9	20		

=== Retired fleet ===
Peruvian Airlines previously operated the following aircraft:

Peruvian Airlines retired fleet
Aircraft	Total	Introduced	Retired	Notes
Boeing 737-200	8	2009	2018	
Douglas DC-8-73CF	2	2013	2019	

== Accidents and incidents ==
- On March 20, 2016, Peruvian Airlines Flight 218, operated by a Boeing 737-500 (registration OB-2041-P) rejected takeoff when an engine ingested a bird. A problem with the braking system resulted in a burst tire and the plane veered off the runway. No injuries were reported with a 120 passengers and crew on board.
- On March 28, 2017, Peruvian Airlines Flight 112, operated by a Boeing 737-300 (registration OB-2036-P) swerved off the runway while landing at Francisco Carle Airport and subsequently caught fire. All 141 onboard survived the accident.
- On November 23, 2018, Peruvian Airlines Flight 331, operated by a Boeing 737-500 (registration OB-2041-P), suffered the collapse of its landing gear as it attempted to land at El Alto International Airport in La Paz, Bolivia. The plane was arriving from Cusco with 122 passengers and five crew members on board. No injuries were reported.

== See also ==
- List of defunct airlines of Peru
