= Flight 603 =

Flight 603 may refer to:

- Dominicana de Aviación Flight 603 which crashed on 15 February 1970 when the dual-engine failure due to fuel contamination
- Continental Airlines Flight 603 which aborted a takeoff due to landing gear failure on 1 March, 1978
- Aeroperú Flight 603 which crashed into the Pacific Ocean due to a maintenance error on 2 October, 1996
