= Continental Airlines Flight 603 =

1978 aviation accident

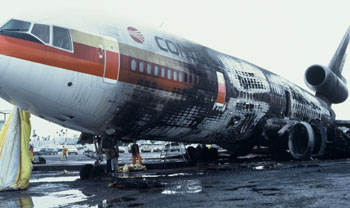
- The burnt-out wreckage of the aircraft

Accident
- Date: March 1, 1978
- Summary: Aborted takeoff due to tire blowout
- Site: Runway 6R, Los Angeles International Airport; 33.9500°N 118.4017°W
- Total fatalities: 4
- Total injuries: 39

Aircraft
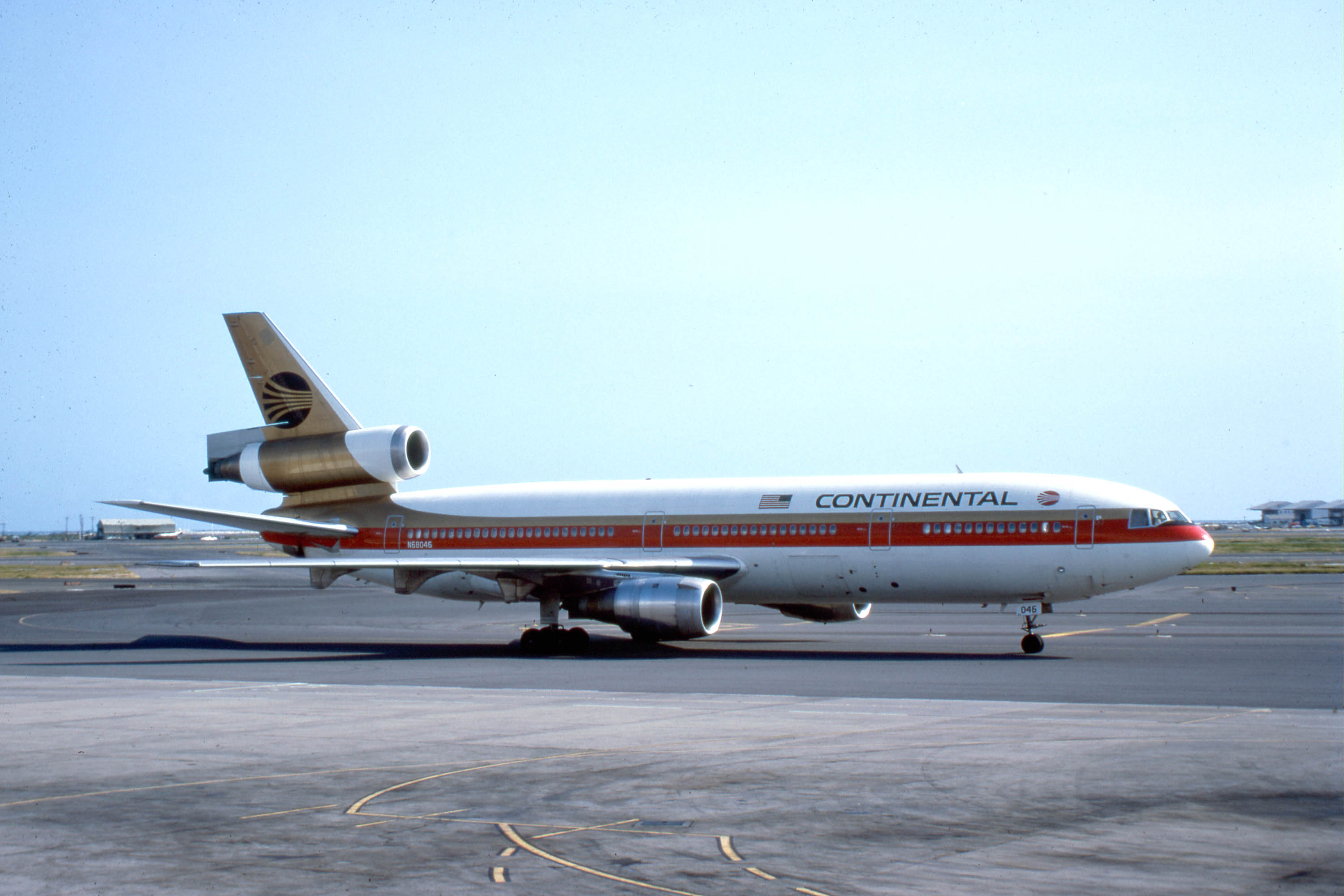
- N68046, sister ship to the one involved in the accident
- Aircraft type: McDonnell Douglas DC-10-10
- Operator: Continental Airlines
- Call sign: CONTINENTAL 603
- Registration: N68045
- Flight origin: Los Angeles International Airport, California, United States
- Destination: Honolulu International Airport, Hawaii, United States
- Occupants: 200
- Passengers: 186
- Crew: 14
- Fatalities: 4 (Note: The NTSB's final report lists two fatal injuries and 31 serious injuries. However, two of the 31 people reported by the NTSB as having "serious" injuries actually died as a result of the crash. These two individuals, both passengers, initially survived the crash, but died 3 months later from their injuries. In its final report, the NTSB explained that at the time, 49 CFR 830.2 required it to only identify persons who died within 7 days of an accident as fatalities. In accordance with the regulation, the NTSB did not list these two deceased passengers as fatalities, instead including them in the NTSB's count of 31 "serious" injuries. A 2008 retrospective published by the Orange County Register accurately described the accident as resulting in a total of four fatalities and 29 serious injuries.)
- Injuries: 29
- Survivors: 196

Ground casualties
- Ground fatalities: 0
- Ground injuries: 10

Continental Airlines Flight 603 was a scheduled McDonnell Douglas DC-10 flight between Los Angeles International Airport and Honolulu International Airport. On March 1, 1978, it crashed during an aborted takeoff, resulting in the deaths of four passengers. The cause of the accident was attributed to a tire blowout which had a cascading effect leading to the failure of two more nearby tires.

== Background ==
=== Aircraft ===
The aircraft involved was a McDonnell Douglas DC-10-10, registered as N68045, which first flew in 1972.

In command was 59-year-old Captain Charles E. Hersche, who was operating his last flight before retirement. He had been with Continental Airlines since 1946 and had logged 29,000 flight hours, including 2,911 hours on the DC-10. Hersche served with the U.S. Air Force from 1942 through 1953 during World War II and Korean War.

His co-pilot was 40-year-old First Officer Michael J. Provan, who had been with Continental Airlines since 1966 and had 10,000 flight hours, with 1,149 of them on the DC-10.

The flight engineer was 39-year-old Second Officer John K. Olsen, who had been with the airline since 1968. He was the least experienced member of the crew with 8,000 flight hours, 1,520 of them on the DC-10.

== Accident ==
The aircraft began its take-off from Los Angeles International Airport at around 9:25 am. During the takeoff roll on runway 6R, the recapped tread of the number-two tire on the left main landing gear separated from the tire and the resulting overload caused that tire to blow out. That, in turn, imposed an overload on the number-one tire on the same axle, resulting in a second blowout almost immediately after the first blowout. Pieces of metal from the rims of the failed tires then damaged the number-five tire on the left main gear, causing it to also blow out.

Although Captain Hershe initiated the abort procedure at 4 knots (7.4 km/h; 4.6 mph) below V_{1} speed, it became apparent the aircraft could not stop within the confines of the runway. This was the direct result of the partial loss of braking power following the failure of the three tires on the left main gear, and also because the runway was wet. The captain steered the aircraft to go off the end of the right half of the runway in an effort "to go beside the stanchions holding the runway lights", thus avoiding a collision with the approach light stanchions, which were positioned immediately beyond the end of the runway. About 100 feet (30 m) beyond the end of the runway, the left main gear broke through the nonload-bearing pavement, which caused it to collapse rearward. Portions of the failed gear punctured fuel tanks in the left wing, immediately starting a fuel fire on the left side.

The aircraft slid to a stop about 664 feet (202 m) beyond the departure end of the runway. Because of the fire on the left side of the aircraft, all passengers evacuated on the right side. All four emergency evacuation slides on the right side of the aircraft were affected by the heat and failed at some point during the evacuation. Flight 603's flight crew and an off-duty pilot worked quickly to guide passengers to alternate exits as the slides failed, actions later commended by the National Transportation Safety Board (NTSB) for saving lives and reducing the number of injuries. Passengers who were still on board after the last slide failed were forced to either jump to the ground, or use a slide rope deployed from the first officer's cockpit window.

Of the 186 passengers and 14 crew on board, two passengers died due to burning and smoke inhalation. Moreover, 28 passengers and three crew members were seriously injured during the evacuation. Two of the seriously injured passengers died as a result of their injuries about three months later. Ten firefighters were also injured during the emergency response.

A large portion of the aircraft's left section was destroyed. The aircraft subsequently was written off as a hull loss. The accident represents the second fatal accident and fifth hull loss of a McDonnell Douglas DC-10.

== Investigation ==
During its investigation, the NTSB found the number-two tire failed because it threw off its (recapped) tread. The number-one tire then failed because it was overloaded and had fatigue in its ply structure. The number-five tire then failed, because it was hit with a piece or pieces of metal from either the number-two or -one wheel. The failure of that third tire on the left main gear probably contributed to the gear breaking through the nonload-bearing pavement beyond the end of the runway, which in turn caused the gear to collapse and puncture the fuel tanks. Additionally, the NTSB stated: "The tires on the aircraft may have been operated in the over-deflection condition, since the average inflation pressure was less than the optimum pressure for maximum gross weight."

The NTSB made recommendations to the Federal Aviation Administration (FAA), including that the FAA prohibit mounting on the same axle different models of tires, which had different load-bearing characteristics and also that greater load-bearing characteristics be required in tires manufactured in the future. The NTSB also issued a series of recommendations regarding improvements to aircraft evacuation safety, including development of more durable and fire-resistant slides, and the placement of evacuation ropes at emergency exits for use in the event of slide failure.

The flight's cockpit voice recorder was inoperative due to having a broken tape. The flight captain discovered the malfunction during a preflight check and requested a repair, but no repair was performed and the captain did not recheck it. The problem was not recorded in the aircraft logbook.

== Aftermath ==
After the investigation of this accident was completed, the FAA made a number of rule changes improving runway performance, including updated tire rating criteria, performance standards, and testing requirements. In addition, the FAA mandated changes to the design of evacuation slides to increase their capacity, improve fire resistance, and inflate at a quicker speed.

== See also ==
- Peruvian Airlines Flight 112
- FedEx Express Flight 910
- List of unrecovered and unusable flight recorders
