= Flight 910 =

Flight 910 may refer to

- American Airlines Flight 910, mid-air collision on 28 June 1952
- FedEx Express Flight 910, runway skid on 28 October 2016
