= FedEx Express Flight 910 =

2016 aviation incident

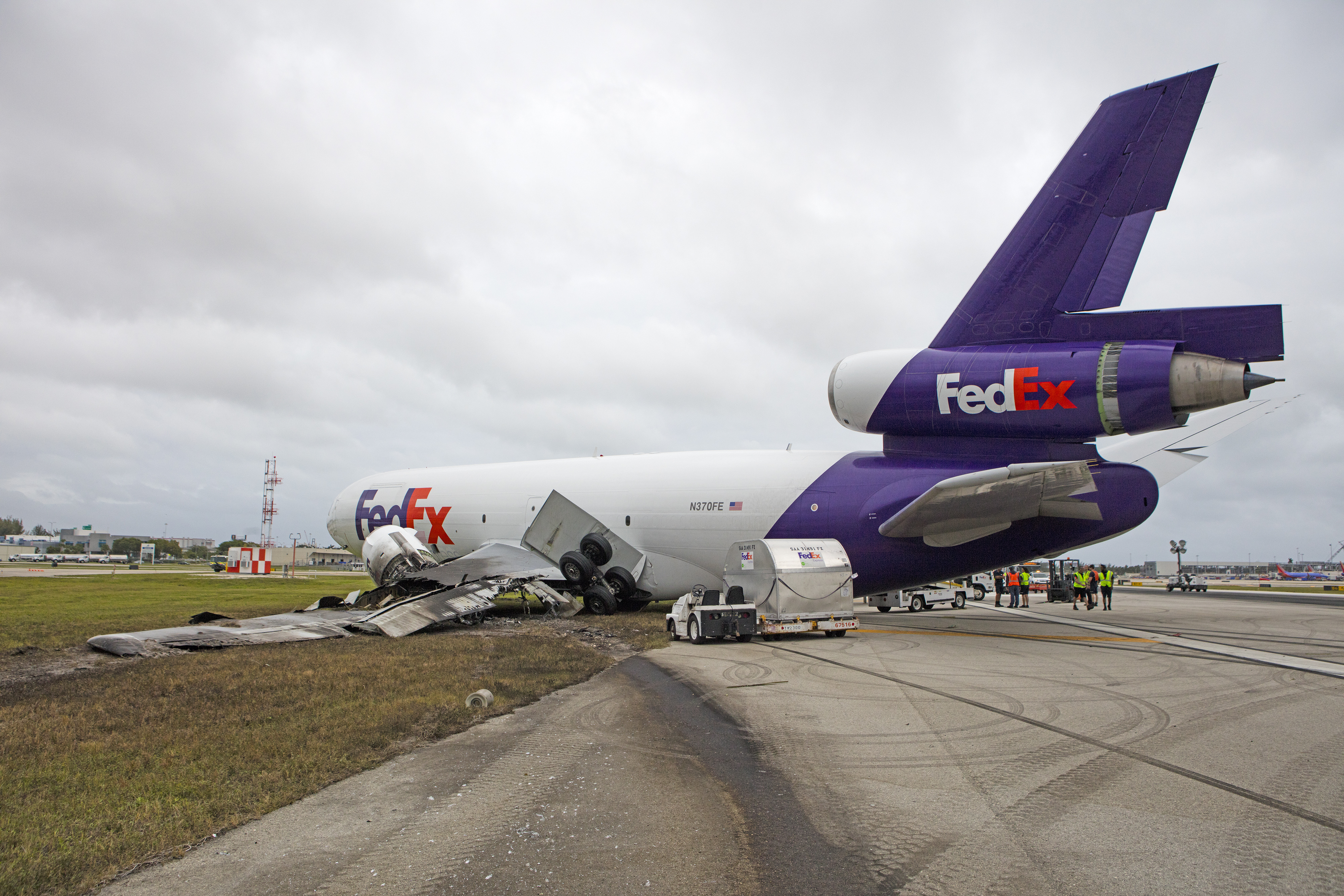
- The accident aircraft a day later, sitting where it came to a stop on the edge of the runway

Accident
- Date: October 28, 2016
- Summary: Landing gear collapse and caught fire due to metal fatigue
- Site: Fort Lauderdale–Hollywood International Airport; 26°04′37″N 80°08′47″W

Aircraft
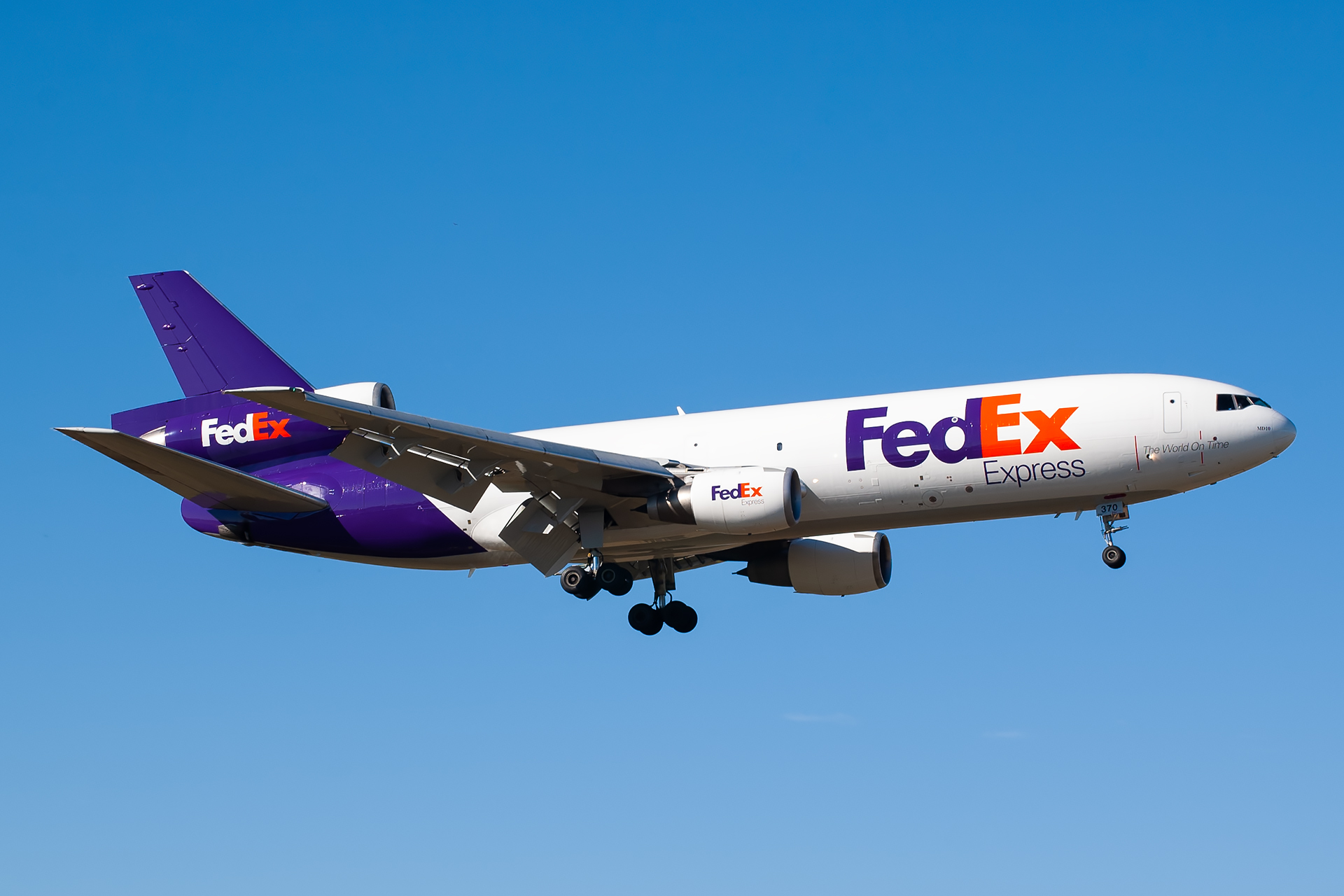
- N370FE, the aircraft involved in the accident, photographed in 2007
- Aircraft type: McDonnell Douglas MD-10-10F
- Aircraft name: Jay
- Operator: FedEx Express
- IATA flight No.: FX910
- ICAO flight No.: FDX910
- Call sign: FEDEX 910
- Registration: N370FE
- Flight origin: Memphis International Airport, Memphis, Tennessee, United States
- Destination: Fort Lauderdale–Hollywood International Airport, Unincorporated Broward County, Florida, United States
- Occupants: 2
- Crew: 2
- Fatalities: 0
- Injuries: 1
- Survivors: 2

On October 28, 2016, FedEx Express Flight 910, a McDonnell Douglas MD-10-10F flying from Memphis International Airport to Fort Lauderdale–Hollywood International Airport was involved in a runway skid after a landing gear collapse, which resulted in a fire partially destroying the left engine and wing. No one was killed, however, the captain suffered minor injuries.

== Background ==
A video showing N370FE up in flames

=== Aircraft ===
The aircraft involved was a McDonnell Douglas MD-10-10F built in 1972 as a DC-10 passenger aircraft, and was first delivered to United Airlines and operated for the airline until FedEx purchased the aircraft on August 21, 1997. It was later converted to cargo configuration on July 3, 1999, and upgraded to an MD-10 on November 2, 2003. It had logged 84589 airframe hours in 35606 takeoff and landing cycles. It was powered by three General Electric CF6-6D engines and the aircraft was 44 years old at the time of the accident.

=== Crew ===
In command was Captain William Pope, aged 55, hired as a flight engineer by FedEx in 2000. He had previously served with the U.S. Air Force from 1982 to 2000, being a veteran of the Gulf War, Bosnian War, and Kosovo War. At the company, he worked on the Boeing 727 as a flight engineer, a first officer, and a captain, as well as a captain on the MD-11. He had a total flight time of about 10,000 hours (he was uncertain about his time as pilot-in-command) and estimated about 1,500 hours in the MD-11.,

His co-pilot was First Officer Kevin Lucas, aged 47, hired as a flight instructor by FedEx in 2004. He also previously served with the U.S. Air Force from 1989 to 2004, veteran of the Gulf War, Bosnian War and Kosovo War. In 2007, he became a flight engineer in the Boeing 727 and became a first officer in the MD-11 in 2012. He estimated a total flight time of 6,000 to 6,300 hours, with about 4,000 hours as pilot-in-command. He estimated a total time of about 400 to 500 hours in the MD-11.

== Accident ==
FedEx Flight 910 landed on Fort Lauderdale's runway 10L at 17:50 local time (21:50Z). The tower reported the left side CF6 engine appeared on fire. The aircraft came to a stop about 6,580 feet (2,010 m) down the runway and beyond the left edge with the left main gear collapsed and the left wing on fire. The airport closed all runways while emergency services responded to put the fire out. Out of the crew members onboard, one was injured, and the aircraft received substantial damage. The National Transportation Safety Board (NTSB) dispatched five investigators on site and opened an investigation.

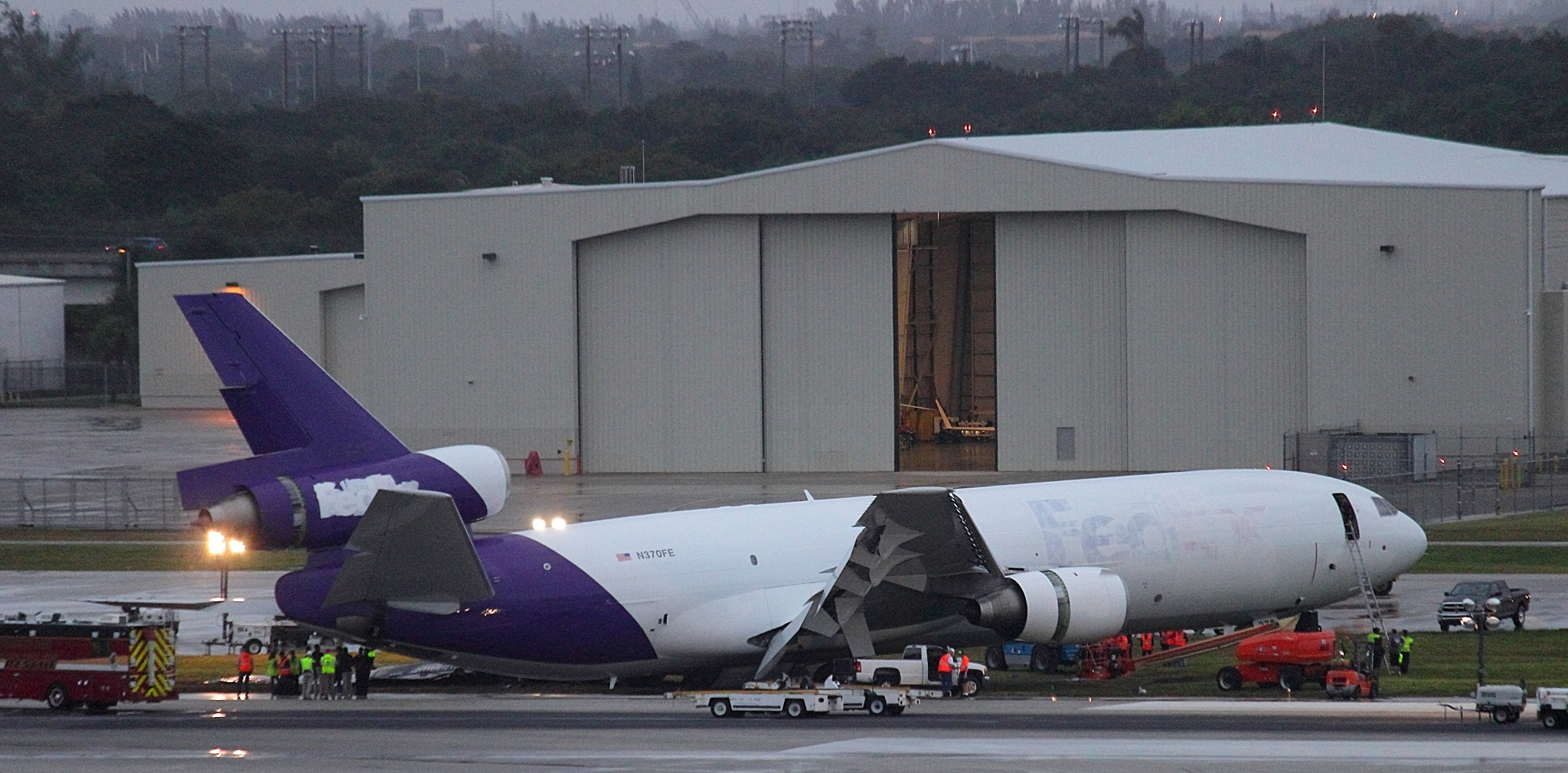
The aftermath of the aircraft with the name faded

On October 31, the NTSB reported that the left main gear failed after landing and during rollout. The left engine and left wing scraped the runway and the aircraft veered to the left and came to a stop partially off the runway. Both flight crew members escaped through the right cockpit window using an escape rope. One injury was reported. Cockpit voice and flight data recorders were taken to the NTSB lab in Washington for analysis. Following an examination of the runway, the NTSB returned control of the runway to the Fort Lauderdale Airport.

== Investigation ==
On August 23, 2018, the NTSB reported that "the failure of the left main gear was the result of a metal fatigue crack that initiated within the gear," and cited FedEx's failure to overhaul the gear at the manufacturer-recommended eight-year interval as a contributor to the crash.

== See also ==
Similar accidents

- FedEx Express Flight 630
- FedEx Express Flight 14
- FedEx Express Flight 647
- FedEx Express Flight 80
- China Airlines Flight 642
- Peruvian Airlines Flight 112
- Continental Airlines Flight 603
- Dynamic Airways Flight 405
