= La Tierra de Jauja =

La Tierra de Jauja (English: The Land of Jauja) is a Spanish paso or entremés, written by Lope de Rueda and first published in 1547. The short dramatic piece tells the story of two hungry thieves who devise a plan to con a simpleton out of his food by telling him about the fictional wonders of the Land of Jauja. While one tells the story the other steals the food until it is all gone.

== Plot ==
The play opens with the two thieves, Honziguera and Panarizo reuniting. Honziguera is upset that Panarizo did not stay behind at the tavern to steal the money of the drunken patrons. Panarizo is upset that Honziguera left him at the tavern by himself with a large debt. To make matter worse, Panarizo left their weapon, a sword, behind. While Honziguera is scolding Panarizo about leaving the sword, Panarizo states that he is hungry, and tells Honziguera to give him something to eat. Honziguera responds that he is also hungry and that he is waiting around for a simpleton who passes by every day carrying food for his wife who is in jail. He has come up with a plan to trick this simpleton out of the food he is carrying, filling his own belly and his partner's in the process.

Mendrugo, the simpleton, enters the scene mindlessly singing. Mendrugo is greeted by the two thieves, who ask him where he is going and why. Mendrugo tells them he is going to the jail to deliver some food to his wife. She is in jail for procuring. Panarizo asks Mendrugo if she was defended. He answers yes, and now they are getting a bishopric. He says his wife wants to rule, and that they will be rich. Mendrugo then asks Panarizo about the benefits of presiding over a bishopric. He tells him that they get lots of honey and old shoes. When Mendrugo hears this he gets excited about the "perks". When Mendrugo is asked why he is excited he responds that he wants to be the "obispeso" the bishop, the correct word being "obispo".

Honziguera uses this opportunity to start the story of the fantastical Land of Jauja, and how Mendrugo should try to preside over this wonderful place instead. Mendrugo has never heard of the Land of Jauja and sits to hear of its many wonders. Some of these wonders include slapping men for working, trees with trunks of bacon, and talking food that begs to be eaten. As one thief captures Mendrugo's attention with "facts" of Jauja, the other eats food out of the simpleton's stew pot.

Some versions leave Mendrugo engrossed in the story, never realizing that Jauja is not a real place or that his food is being taken from under his nose. Other versions end with Mendrugo realizing that the thieves have left him with nothing more than an empty pot.

== Characters ==
Honziguera - The thief that devises the plan to tell the simpleton the story of the Land of Jauja, and steal his food.

Panarizo - The other thief that goes along with Honziguera's plan.

Mendrugo - He is the simpleton that takes food to his wife in prison every day. He gets conned by the two thieves during the telling of the "Land of Jauja".

Wife of Mendrugo - She is mentioned briefly, but is never shown and does not have a speaking role. She is in jail for procuring.

== Commedia dell'arte ==
After being trained as a gold beater, Lope de Rueda led a theater troupe using the style and influence of an Italian movement called Commedia dell'arte. He wrote several full length plays using this style, but he is more famous for the short works which he called, pasos. These pasos are characterized as having stock characters, containing every day situations, and broad humor. The pasos were generally performed during the intermission of full length plays, and served as entertainment for all social classes.

=== Stock Characters represented in La tierra de Jauja ===
- Bobo, simpleton - This character is usually a servant, the butt of the ridicule, causing enjoyment due to his stupidity and ignorance. Generally, his only goal is to fill his stomach.
- Gracioso - This character is often seen as a clown or a fool, but is also intelligent and wise. He plays the opposite of the Bobo, and generally gets the upper hand.

== The Land of Jauja ==
=== Fictional Jauja ===
Jauja goes by several different names such as Xauja, País de Cucaña, Cockaigne, and others.

Jauja is a fictional land somewhere in the Americas. People in Spain, during the 16th and 17th century, would dream about this land where everything is good, much like the way people dream of Atlantis. Many people believed that in this land there was no need to work. The reason for the myths about Jauja came from the tales of the wealth and the good fortune of the conquistadores in the actual town of Jauja in Peru.

There were many writings about this mysterious, glorious land. This is an expert of a poem about Cockaigne:

Far out to sea and west of Spain
There is a country named Cockaygne.
No place on earth compares to this
For sheer delightfulness and bliss.
Though Paradise is fair and bright,
Cockaygne is a finer sight.
In Paradise what's to be seen
But grass and flowers and branches green?
Though paradisal joys are sweet,
There's nothing there but fruit to eat;
No bench, no chamber, and no hall,
No alcoholic drink at all.
Its inhabitants are few,
Elijah, Enoch---just the two;
They must find it boring there
Without more company to share.
But Cockaygne offers better fare,
And without worry, work, or care;

=== Jauja, Peru ===
Jauja, Peru was established in 1534 by Spanish conquistador Francisco Pizarro. He wanted to keep the Quechua name of the town "Xauxa". Pizarro found out that Jauja had a great deal of provisions such as food, clothing, and wealth and became a major city in Peru. Also, the dry climate of Jauja was easy on those with respiratory problems, and because of this there was a large hospital that tended to many Spaniards.

== Modern Stories of Jauja ==
País de Jauja - This is a Spanish Language novel written in 1993 by Edgardo Rivera Martínez. This story is set in the 1940s, the protagonist is a teenage boy who is an aspiring writer and musician. One summer he learns a lot about his family history and the story of Jauja. This fictional novel combines history and myth.

La Utopía Arcaica. José María Arguedas y Las Ficciones Del Indigenismo - This book is Spanish language written by Mario Vargas Llosa in 1996. This book is about factual events and does not deal with the mythical side of Jauja, Peru. Vargas Llosa feels that it is important to give the actual historic details.
