= Peruvian Airlines Flight 112 =

2017 aviation incident

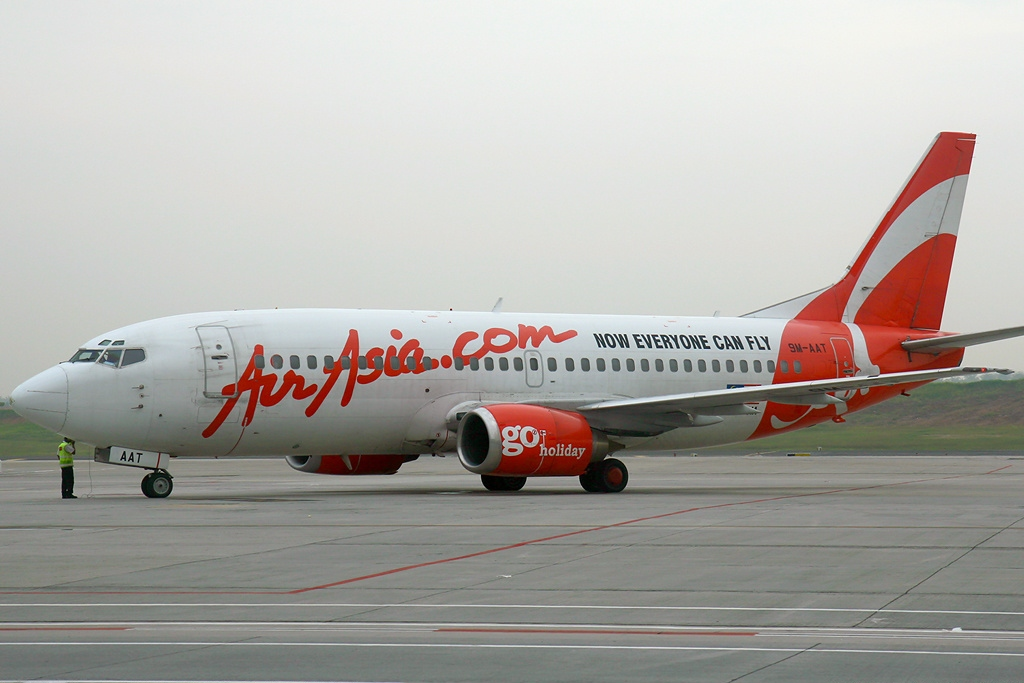
- The aircraft involved, seen in 2007 while still operating for AirAsia

Accident
- Date: 28 March 2017
- Summary: Landing gear collapse after a hard landing caused by mechanical failure
- Site: Francisco Carle Airport, Jauja, Peru

Aircraft
- Aircraft type: Boeing 737-3M8
- Operator: Peruvian Airlines
- IATA flight No.: P9112
- ICAO flight No.: PVN112
- Call sign: PERUVIAN 112
- Registration: OB-2036-P
- Flight origin: Jorge Chávez International Airport, Lima, Peru
- Destination: Francisco Carle Airport, Jauja, Peru
- Occupants: 150
- Passengers: 141
- Crew: 9
- Fatalities: 0
- Injuries: 39
- Survivors: 150

Peruvian Airlines Flight 112 was a domestic scheduled passenger flight operated by a Boeing 737-300 from Lima to Jauja in Peru. On 28 March 2017, the aircraft operating the flight suffered undercarriage collapse after landing, caught fire, and was burnt out. While no fatalities occurred in this accident, 39 of the 150 people on board were injured.

== Accident ==
External videos
- Passenger's video of the landing

The aircraft landed at Jauja at 16:40 local time (21:40 UTC). Passengers reported "two strong impacts" on landing. All three landing gear legs collapsed and the aircraft slid along the runway and departed the runway to the right, and the starboard wing hit the airport's perimeter fence. A fire broke out and destroyed the aircraft. All 141 passengers and nine crew on board escaped, of whom 39 people were injured and taken to hospital. Two people sustained broken bones, and three people sustained concussions. The accident was captured by several passengers on board.

== Aircraft ==
The accident aircraft was a Boeing 737-3M8, (Note: The aircraft was a Boeing 737-300 model; Boeing assigns a unique code for each company that buys one of its aircraft, which is applied as a suffix to the model number at the time the aircraft is built, hence "737-3M8".) msn 25071, registration OB-2036-P.

== Investigations ==
The Commission for the Investigation of Aviation Accidents, and the Criminal Prosecutor's Office in Jauja both opened investigations into the accident.

The Commission for the Investigation of Aviation Accidents (CIAA) released its final report in November 2020 and determined that the cause of the accident was a mechanical failure of mechanical components of the shimmy damper systems on both main landing gear struts which, due to being outside of tolerance, were not able to correctly dampen the vibrations and lateral oscillations of the wheels causing "shimmy" events. The sequence of shimmy events in both main gear struts led to the fracture and collapse of both main gear struts.

The Commission for the Investigation of Aviation Accidents also found other contributing factors that were the following:

- An incorrect and maybe missing data about the measurements of mechanical components of the shimmy damper kinematic system that are probably not present inside the Aircraft Maintenance Manuals (AMM) that are handed over to Peruvian Airlines, the presence of this data's would have permitted to take timely detection and replacements of components that are overcome their tolerance limits;
- The Boeing service letter named Main Landing Gear (MLG) Lower Torsion Link Fractures does not required any mandatory action to prevent problems but only recommends maintenance actions to prevent fractures in the mechanical components of the shimmy damper system;
- The Boeing service letter named Main Landing Gear Lower Torsion Link Fractures is too complicated to interpret and possibly confusing about which one Aircraft Maintenance Manuals actions are to take in consideration and in which ambit.
