= Francisco Carle Airport =

Airport in Peru

Francisco Carle Airport Jauja Airport
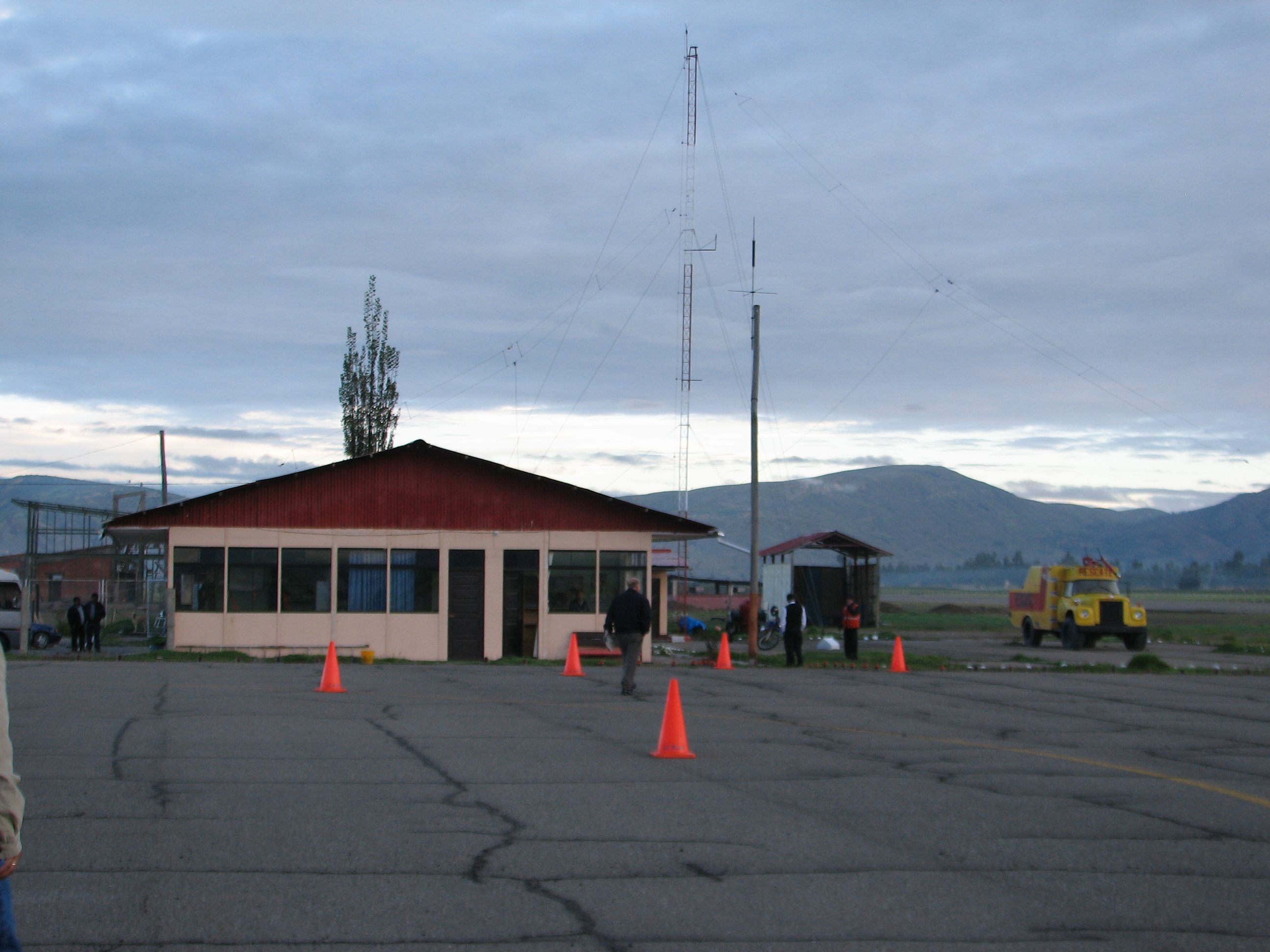
- IATA: JAU; ICAO: SPJJ

Summary
- Airport type: Public
- Operator: CORPAC
- Location: Jauja
- Elevation AMSL: 11,034 ft / 3,363 m
- Coordinates: 11°47′00″S 75°28′25″W

Map
- Location of the airport in Peru

Runways
Direction	Length		Surface
Direction	m	ft	Surface
13/31	2,810	9,219	Asphalt
- Sources: GCM Google Maps

Francisco Carle Airport (IATA: JAU, ICAO: SPJJ) is a high-elevation regional airport serving Jauja, in the Junin Region of Peru, and surrounding cities such as Huancayo and Tarma. It is served by two scheduled airlines. The airport terminal and runways have undergone expansion to accommodate larger aircraft. Travelers to domestic and international destinations connect in Lima's Jorge Chávez International Airport.

== Airlines and destinations ==
Airlines	Destinations
LATAM Perú	Lima
Sky Airline Peru	Lima

== Accidents & Incidents ==
- On 28 March 2017 Peruvian Airlines Flight 112, operated by Boeing 737-300 (registration OB-2036-P) landing at Francisco Carle Airport swerved off the runway while landing and caught fire. All 141 people on board the flight escaped without any serious injuries.

== See also ==
- Transport in Peru
- List of airports in Peru
