= Blowout (tire) =

Catastrophic failure of a tire

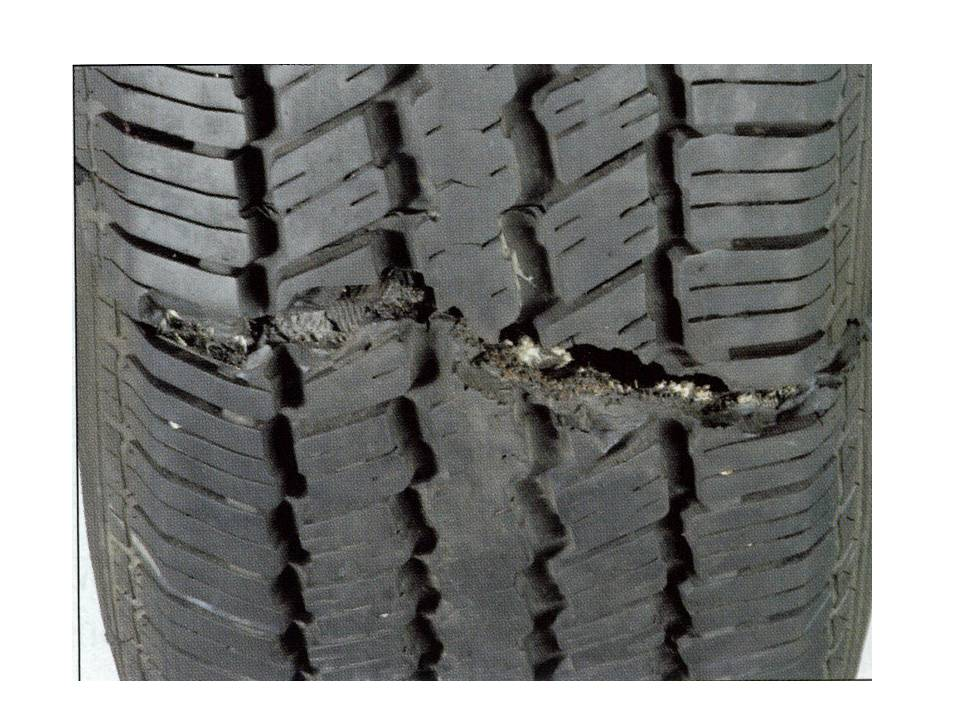
Automobile tire damaged after an impact.

A blowout (also known as a burst) is a rapid, explosive loss of inflation pressure of a pneumatic tire.

The primary cause for a blowout is encountering an object that cuts or tears the structural components of the tire to the point where the structure is incapable of containing the compressed air, with the escaping air adding to further tear through the tire structure. It is also fairly common for tread separations to be termed “blowouts”, even those where the inflation pressure is not compromised. Because of this confusion, the term is rarely used by experts in tire failures, where the term "impact damage" is more frequently employed.

Tire blowouts have been a concern since the dawn of the motoring age. First generation automobile tires suffered from frequent problems until tire materials and technology improved.

Tire blowouts, especially at high speeds, are one of the primary causes of accidents due to loss of control within the vehicle. The nature of resultant accidents ranges from spin-outs to rollovers or even head-on collisions.
