= Jauja =

- Town and municipality
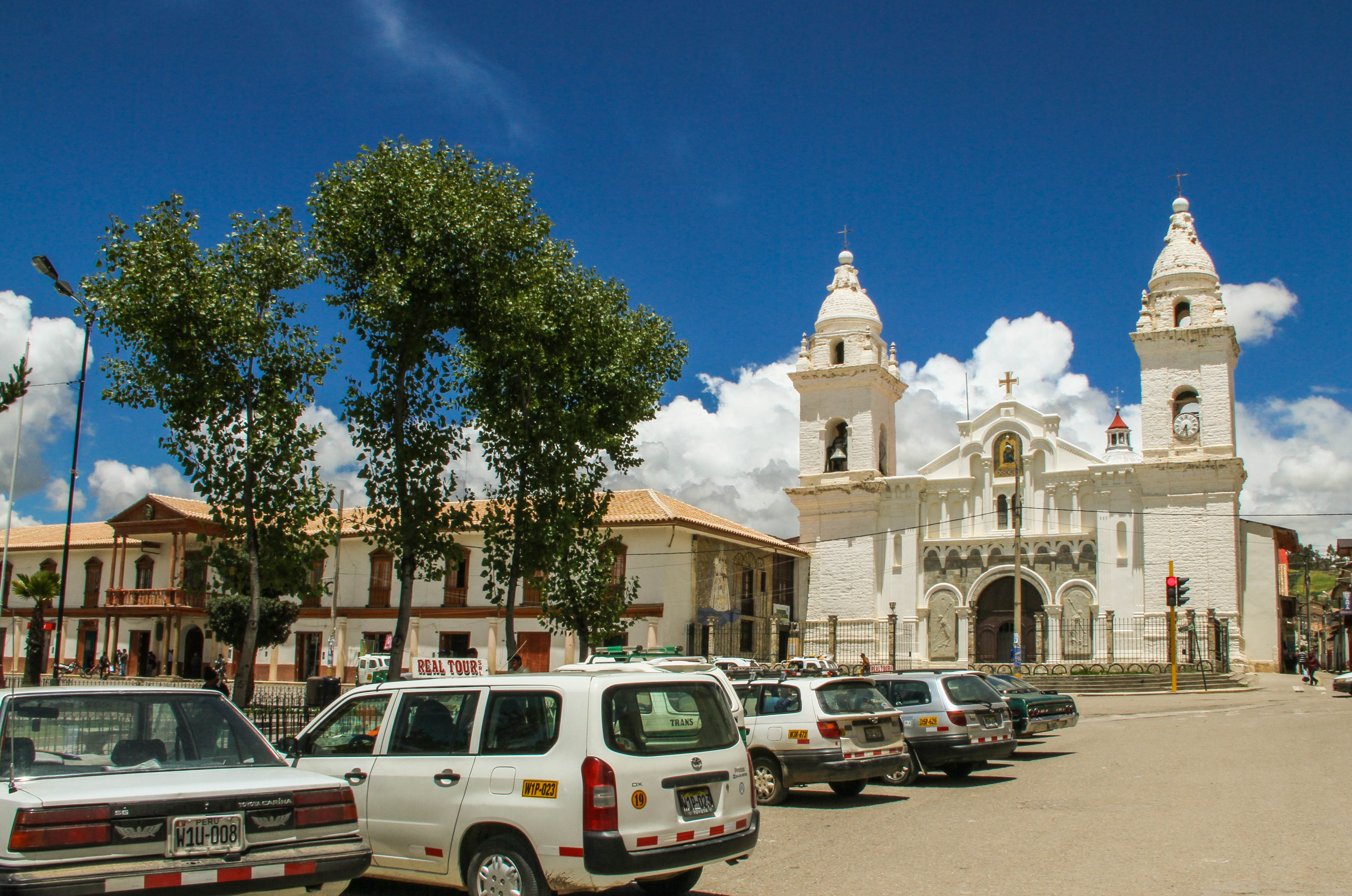
- Partial view of Jauja's Plaza Mayor, from its northeast corner

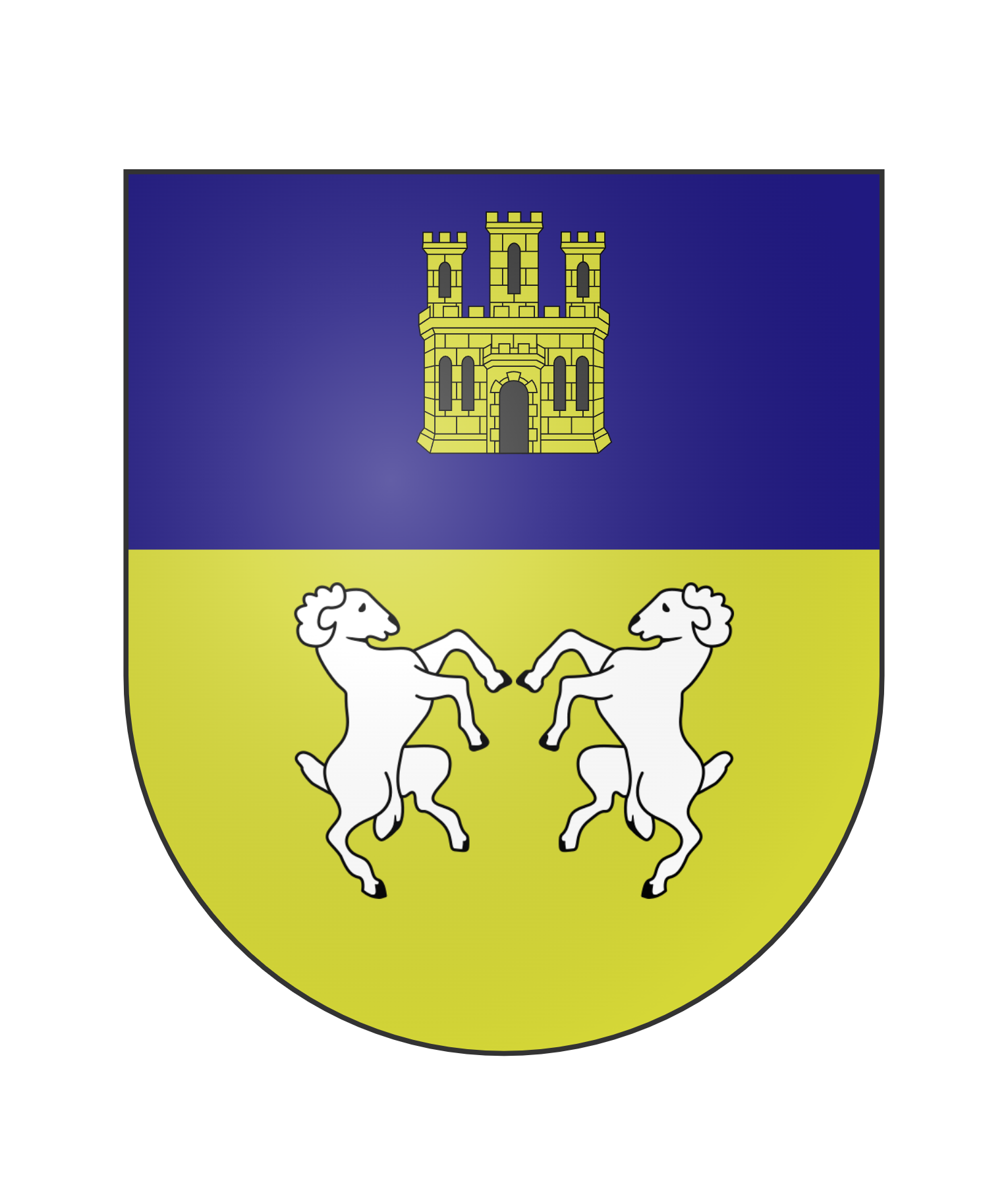
- Seal

- Location within Peru
- Coordinates: 11°46′30″S 75°30′00″W
- Country: Peru
- Region: Junín
- Province: Jauja
- Established: April 25, 1534
- Elevation: 3,400 m (11,200 ft)

Population
  - Estimate (2015): 15,432
- Time zone: UTC-5 (PET)
- Website: www.munijauja.gob.pe

Jauja (Shawsha Wanka Quechua: Sausa, Shawsha or Shausha, formerly in Spanish Xauxa, with pronunciation of "x" as "sh") is a city and capital of Jauja Province in Peru. It is situated in the fertile Mantaro Valley, 45 kilometres (28 mi) to the northwest of Huancayo (the capital of Junín Region), at an altitude of 3,400 metres (11,200 ft). Its population in 2015 was 15,432.

Jauja, which flourished for a short time, was once the capital of Spanish Peru, prior to the founding of Lima as the new capital. Its name is referenced in the popular Spanish expression país de Jauja, which literally means "country of Jauja", but is used figuratively to mean a "never never land" or a "land of milk and honey". The town, with a laid back ambiance and salubrious climate, has narrow streets with houses painted blue. Laguna de Paca lake is close to the city.

== History ==
Previous to the Inca era, the area formed part of the Xauxa-Wanka confederation, a town was inhabited by Xauxa people in the vicinity before the Incas. The Xauxas eventually accepted Inca domination, being renowned warriors Xauxa contributed with soldiers to the campaigns of political and military expansion towards Quito.

During the initial expansion of Inca civilization, Incas established the provincial administrative center of "Hatun Xauxa", the head of the province or wanami of Xauxa. The city of Xauxa was interconnected with the rest of the empire by the main section of the Qhapaq Ñam highway, a royal road connecting Cusco to Quito.

After the Inca Emperor Wayna Qhapaq died in Quito, his body paused at Xauxa, en route to Cusco, as means of respect for the city and his inhabitants because they had been some of the most loyal to his cause of pacifying the northern provinces, roughly modern-day Ecuador.

When Inca civil war broke out, Xauxas supported the Waskar-led faction. Xauxa became military headquarters for the southern faction army against Atawallpa, Xauxa provided soldiers, supplies, storage, etc. to a number of Waskar's generals such as Atoc "The Fox", Hango, or Guanca Auqui the son of Wayna Qhapaq and a Xauxa wife.

Eventually, the Waskar's troops lost the city at the hands of the Inca general Challco Chima as Atawallpa's army continued advancing south towards Cusco.

After capturing Cusco, the Atawallpa general Quiz Quiz took Waskar hostage and imprisoned him in a fortress of Xauxa, he would be later drowned in the nearby Andamarca river.

Months after the Battle of Cajamarca, impatient for the Atwallpa's ransom to be fully paid, waiting at Cajamarca, Francisco Pizarro sent his brother Hernando Pizarro to Pachacamac and Cusco in order to the recollect part of the ransom payment. Upon his return to Cajamarca, Hernando meets Challco Chima in the Xauxa Valley, where he was stationed with his army of 35,000, Hernando deceived Challco Chima by telling him Atawallpa himself requested of his immediate presence at Cajamarca, although suspicious of Hernando, Challco Chima accepted the request and left his army in order to travel with Hernando to Cajamarca where he would be taken captive.

Shortly before Hernando Pizarro arrival to Xauxa, the Waskar's supporting inhabitants revolted against occupying Atawallpa's army and Challco Chima responded by beheading the leaders of the revolt and putting their heads on pikes, for their supporters he ordered the mutilation of men's and women's hands and tongues and that this occurred in the Pampa de Maquinwayo, 5 miles (8.0 km) south of present-day Jauja A Cusquenian noble accompanying the Spanish named Antamareca Mayta, a supporter of Waskar's faction on the civil war, fiercely faced Challco Chima, calling him on the assassinations, Challco Chima immediately responded by attacking the noble or orejón (name used by the Spaniards to refer Inca nobles because of the ceremonial earplugs they wore) but they were separated.

Until when, Chalco Chima, your cruelties must end. When will it be the day that you and that fierce beast of your captain Quizquiz have had enough of human blood. Tell me, rabid puma (puma-ranra)

Later, advancing towards Cuzco, Pizarro's force stopped in Xauxa, where Francisco had Challco Chimac burned alive because of suspicions of secret communications between him and Quiz Quiz, Spanish paranoid increased after the sudden death of Topa Wallpa, who was affiliated to Waskar's Cusco-based faction on the Inca civil war.

Xauxa was a considerable town...seated in the midst of a verdant valley, fertilized by a thousand little rills, which the thrifty Indian husbandmen drew from the parent river. There were several capacious buildings of rough stone...and a temple of some note.

Today the partial ruins of this settlement can be seen on a hill, approximately 3 kilometers (1.9 mi) southeast of the town.

After the Spanish had sealed the conquest of Peru by taking Cusco in 1533, Spanish conquistador Francisco Pizarro established Xauxa as Peru's first capital in April 1534. It was named Santa Fe de Hatun Xauxa in keeping with the Quechua name. In the same year, Pizarro and his men discovered that Xauxa was home to huge accumulations of Inca food, clothing and wealth. The Spaniards recognized that they could live comfortably for months.

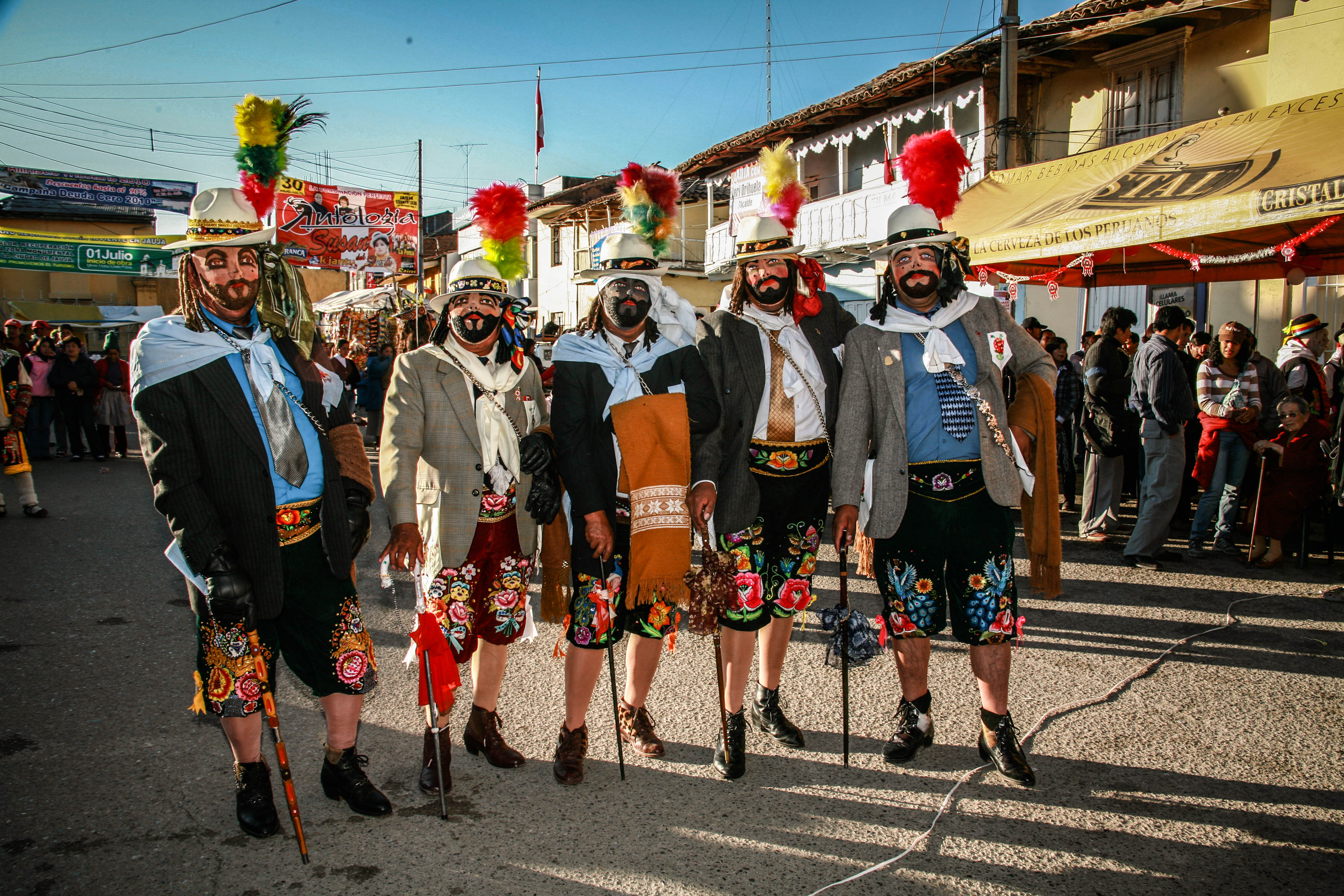
The Tunantada is a typical dance festival of Jauja. One of the characters is the Español (the Spaniard) also called príncipe', shown in this photo. .

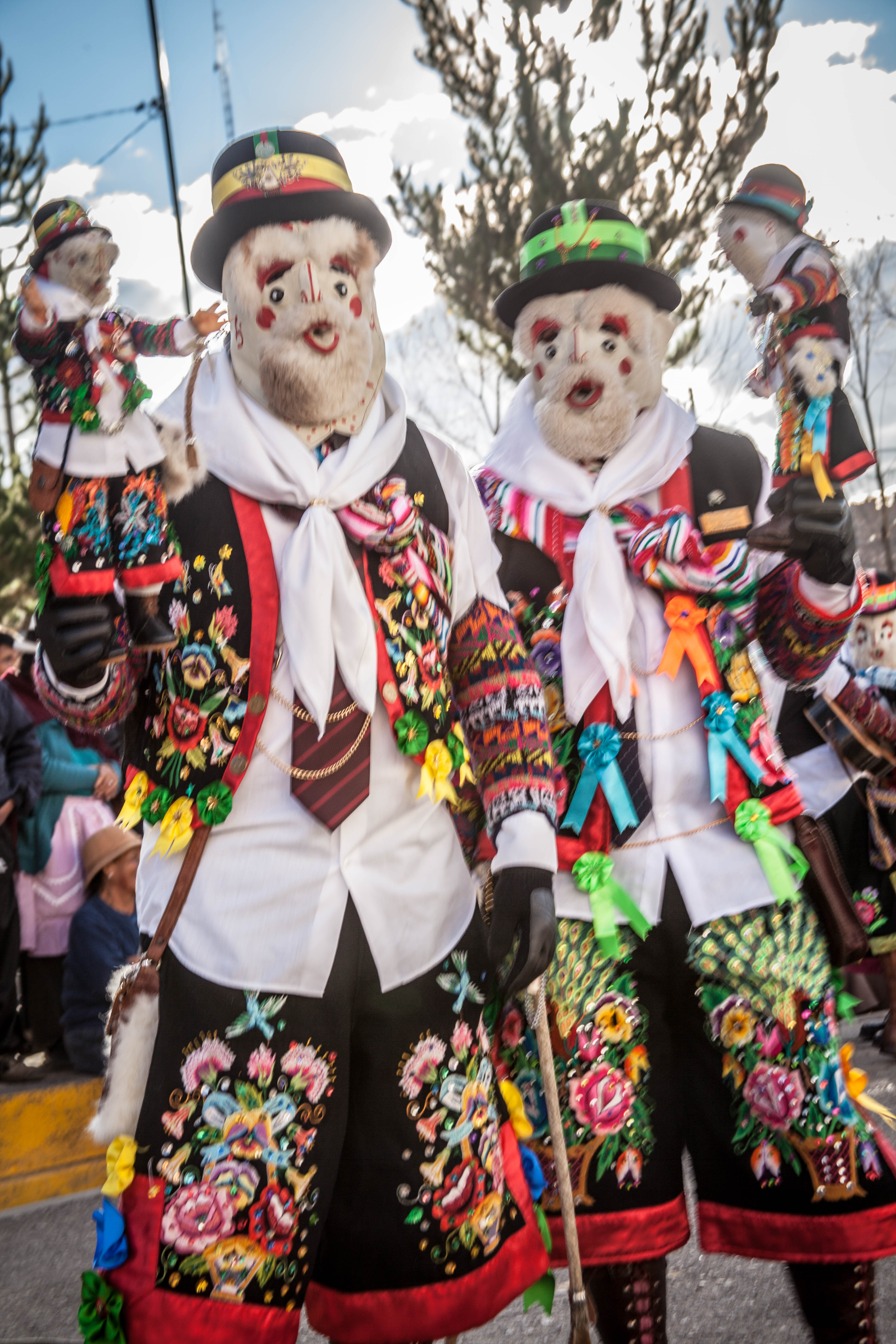
The Chuto is a character of the Tunantada.

When the decision was made in 1535 to move the capital to Lima to take advantage of proximity to the port (Callao), Lima began to overshadow Jauja's importance. During colonial times, Jauja became dependent upon Tarma. Later Huancayo, increased in importance and surpassed Jauja as a commercial centre. Between 1742 and 1756, Juan Santos Atahuala led an uprising in the mountains of Jauja, one of many revolts that would occur in Peru over the years. The first mayor of Jauja was Don Arias Villalobos.

Jauja's dry climate was recognized, however, as being beneficial for patients with respiratory tract tuberculosis. In this regard, the Jauja hospital cared for many Spaniards. The wealth that they brought to Jauja helped it regain in popularity and strengthened the legend of "the land of Cockaigne". With the establishment of the sanatorium "Domingo Olavegoya" Jauja patients came from many parts of the world, making Jauja a cosmopolitan city. This was described in the novel País de Jauja, by Edgardo Rivera Martínez. Tombstones with names from all over the world can be seen in the Jauja cemetery, but after the development of antibiotics, the city began to lose its importance as a health mecca. The small city, however, has retained much of its colonial-era charm. Over the years the people of Jauja have come to refer to their town and region as el país de Jauja; this name was also used in Rivera's book on the area and its culture.

== Geography ==
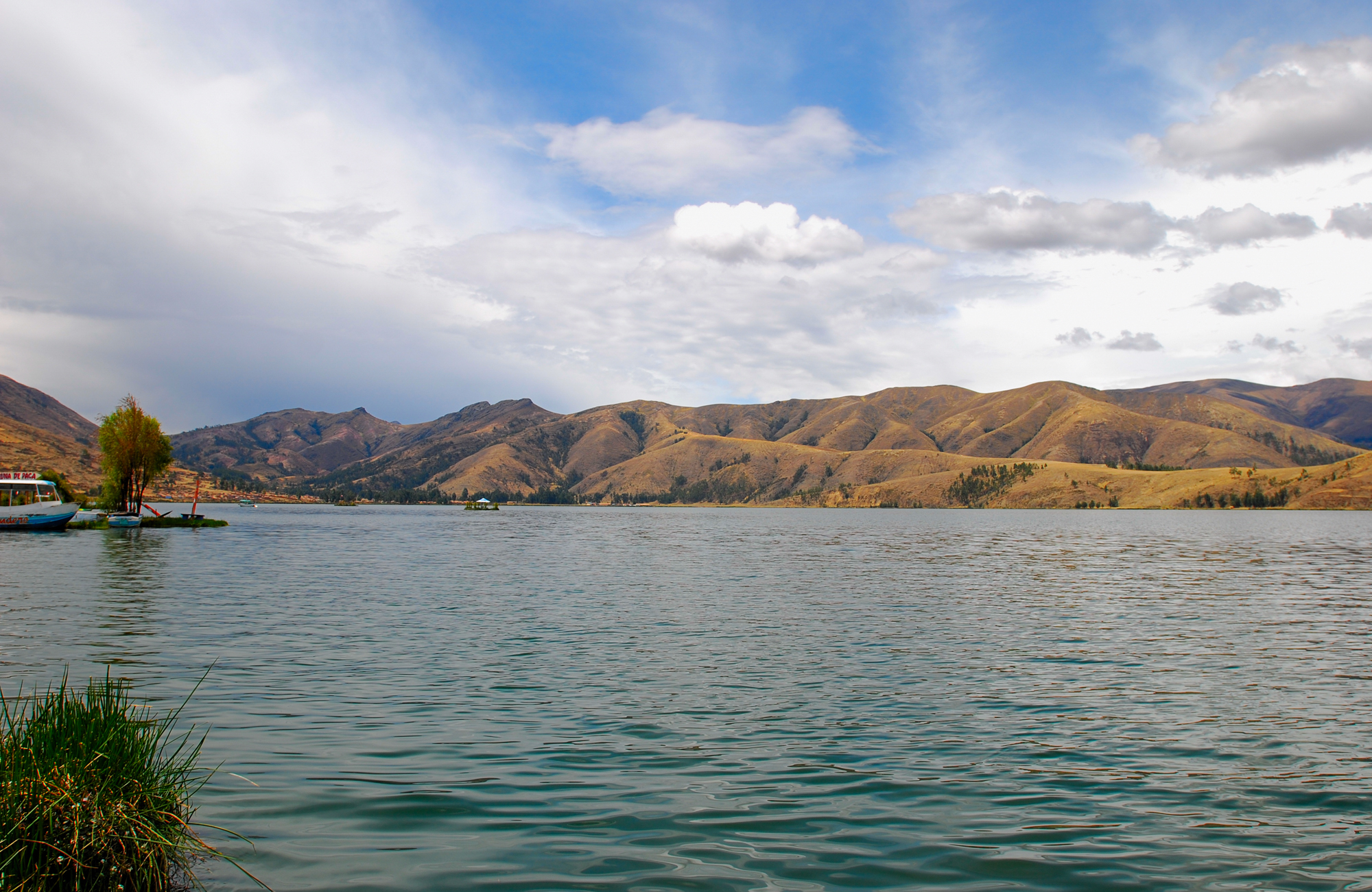
Laguna de Paca

Jauja lies in the fertile Mantaro Valley at an altitude of 3,352 metres (10,997 ft). It is located along Highway 3S which eventually leads to Lima, 40 kilometres (25 mi) to the northwest of the regional capital of Huancayo. 4 kilometres (2.5 mi) to the north of the town is Laguna de Paca, covering an area of 21.4 square kilometres (8.3 mi^{2}). To the west of the town, near the village of Chocon, is the Laguna Tragadero. Villages located in close proximity to Jauja include Huertas, Viscap, Huaripampa, Julcán, Ataura, Masma, El Mantaro, Huamalí, Muquiyauyo, Chocón and San Pedro de Chunán and Yauli, to the east of Laguna de Paca to the north.

The river that forms the Mantaro River Valley, is called the Mantaro River that flows near the town of Jauja into a large alluvial plain. The Mantaro River valley is in the central highlands of Peru bounded by towering Cordillera ranges; the valley has three tributary rivers known as the Masma, the Paca and the Yanamarca. Formation of this region is attributed to diverse sedimentary, glacial and tectonic activity. The valley formation is dated to the Late Pliocene and early Pleistocene uplift unconformity. Its location is about 80 kilometres (50 mi) to the southeast of La Oroya town (a smelting centre of mining industry), 60 kilometres (37 mi) to the south of Tarma and 40 kilometres (25 mi) to the north of Huancayo.

=== Climate ===
The dry climate of the city made Jauja a common place for tuberculosis sufferers to move to since the dry air was good for the kidneys and lungs. Its climate and its relative proximity to the capital of Lima (250 kilometres (160 mi)) made it common for the inhabitants of the city of Lima to travel to this area continually. The weather is divided into three distinct seasons - the rainy season from November to April, winter from May to July and the dry sunny season, with strong winds from August to October.

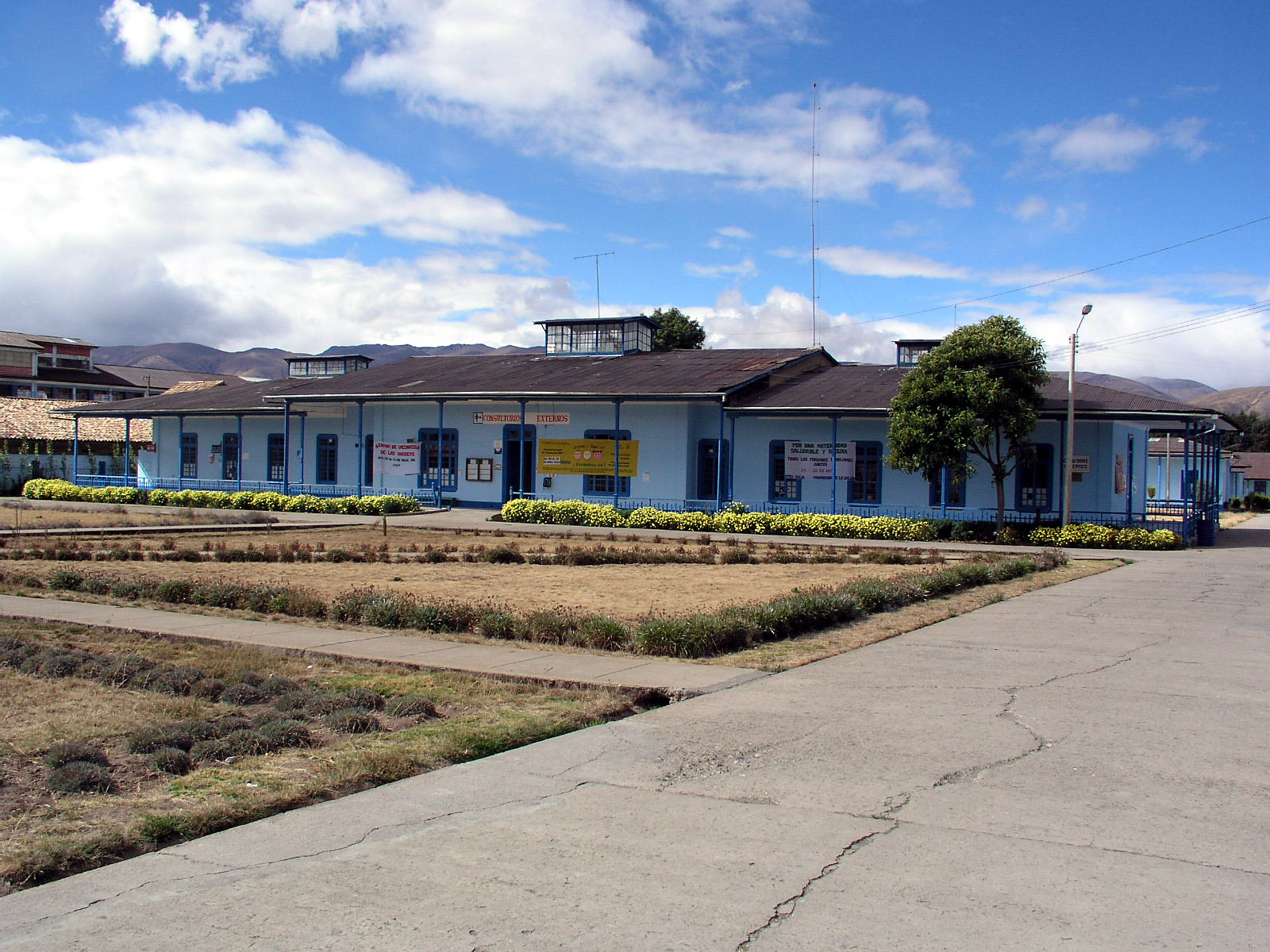
Hospital Domingo Olavegoya, Jauja

Climate data for Jauja, Sausa, elevation 3,363 m (11,033 ft), (1991–2020)
Month	Jan	Feb	Mar	Apr	May	Jun	Jul	Aug	Sep	Oct	Nov	Dec	Year
Mean daily maximum °C (°F)	18.6 (65.5)	18.1 (64.6)	17.9 (64.2)	19.8 (67.6)	19.8 (67.6)	19.5 (67.1)	19.5 (67.1)	19.9 (67.8)	19.9 (67.8)	19.9 (67.8)	20.3 (68.5)	19.2 (66.6)	19.4 (66.9)
Mean daily minimum °C (°F)	6.6 (43.9)	6.8 (44.2)	6.5 (43.7)	5.1 (41.2)	2.4 (36.3)	0.5 (32.9)	−0.2 (31.6)	1.2 (34.2)	3.8 (38.8)	5.3 (41.5)	5.7 (42.3)	6.4 (43.5)	4.2 (39.5)
Average precipitation mm (inches)	104.8 (4.13)	109.0 (4.29)	98.9 (3.89)	44.6 (1.76)	14.3 (0.56)	4.0 (0.16)	3.5 (0.14)	4.6 (0.18)	25.5 (1.00)	51.5 (2.03)	65.4 (2.57)	90.7 (3.57)	616.8 (24.28)
Source: National Meteorology and Hydrology Service of Peru

== Culture ==
Today, Jauja is a city whose main activity is in the retail trade of agricultural products produced in the Mantaro Valley. Its streets are narrow and the houses are mainly built in the Republican Andean style from adobe plastered with plaster, with large wooden doors or hallways.

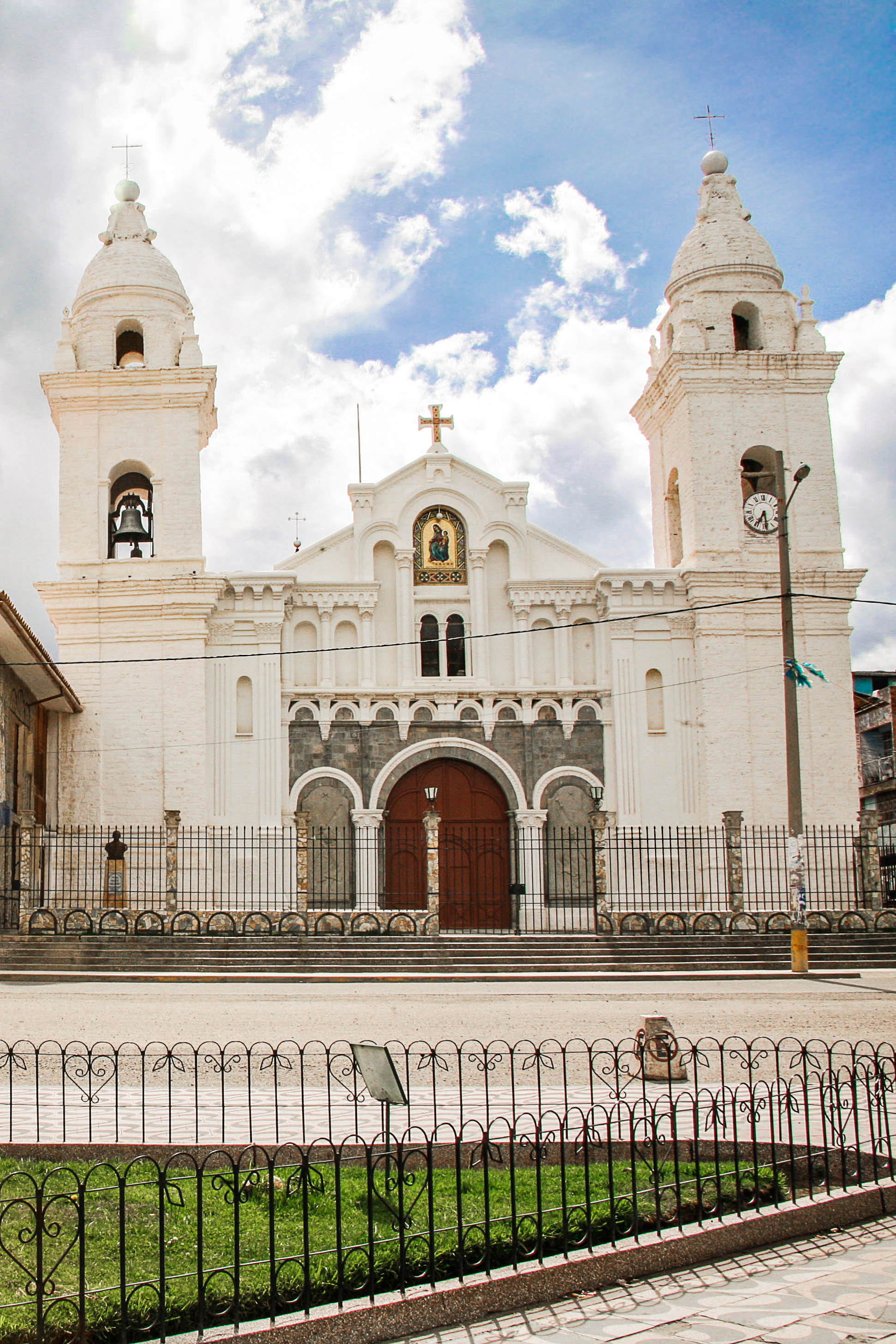
Jauja's Main Church (Iglesia matriz).

The pristine town is famous for its Wednesday and Sunday markets. Barrio La Libertad is one of the older neighbourhoods and is nestled in the eastern part of the city. Its plaza, also named La Libertad, contains a monument atop of which is a golden eagle. An archaeological museum is located in the town, which has exhibits of the ancient Huari culture. The town also has a fossil museum, a collection by a local man. The hill that forms the backdrop for the town has a fine row of Inca storage structures and large number of circular buildings representing the Xauxa culture. Laguna de Paca lake also has number of such stone buildings in ruins.

=== Festivals ===
The cultural life in the city is vibrant, with many festivals and social and religious events taking place throughout the year. The most popular festival is the Feast of San Sebastian and San Fabian (20 January) when Tunantada is celebrated for one week. Tunantada derives from the Spanish 'Tunantes'. Some believe that the origin of the dance lies at the end of the Viceroyalty of Peru and the dawn of the Republican era of Peru. Through this dance of the festival, the natives imitate the Spanish, commemorating the years that the Spanish and natives existed alongside in Jauja. Locals dress up in the form of satirical wire mesh masks, eyes, whiskers and painted white complexion. Some of the dancers carry a baton and wear their pants to the knee, as if they were pure-blooded Spanish. The music initially starts with violin sounds, and then the sounds of clarinets, Andean harps, saxophones, etc.

Other important festivals include Carnival (February and March), the anniversary of the Spanish foundation of the city (April 25), Independence Day (July), Herranza (August), Feast of Mamanchic Rosario, patron saint of Jauja (October), and Adoration of the Child (December).

=== Churches ===
The Xauxas were the earliest settlers in this town, before the Inca also made it their home. This historical town is now seen only in ruins, with three notable carved wooden altars seen as a witness, in a modern adobe church built later in the town. Dating from 1564, the Jauja Cathedral (Iglesia Matriz de Jauja) was built in Baroque and Rococo style. Interior highlights include double drop ceiling tiles, finely carved wooden altars, colonial retablos, and the image of Our Lady of the Rosary (patron of Jauja).The church required rebuilding after collapsing in March 1836 when Estanilslao Marquez was the pastor. The systematic reconstruction was initiated in 1914 by parish priest Fr Paul. The façade was completed in 1921 under Father Barrier, a leading architect of religious buildings. Interior renovations began in 1928. The back of the presbytery includes Solomonic additions. The bell tower is modern and contains brass bells that can be heard for miles. In 1906, a chiming clock was incorporated under pastor Dr. Sixto G. Davila.

Built in Gothic style, the Capilla Cristo Pobre church ("Poor Christ Chapel") is one of the most notable architectural examples in Jauja. It is patterned after Notre-Dame de Paris. Via Crucis's paintings, brought from France, are on display at the Capilla de Cristo Pobre. The church is administered by the Daughters of Charity and is part of the San Vicente de Paul High School.

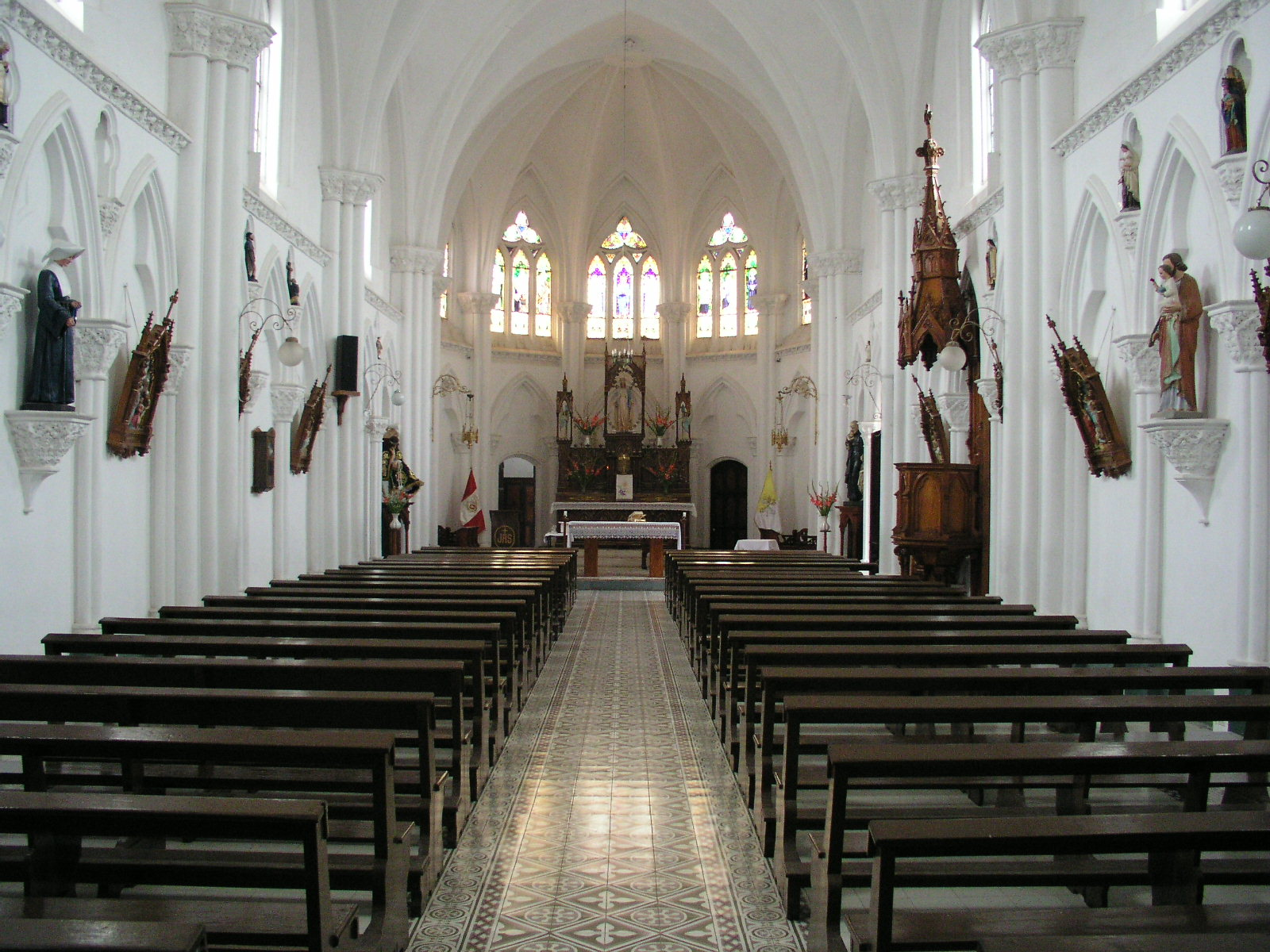
Inside the Capilla Cristo Pobre church in Jauja

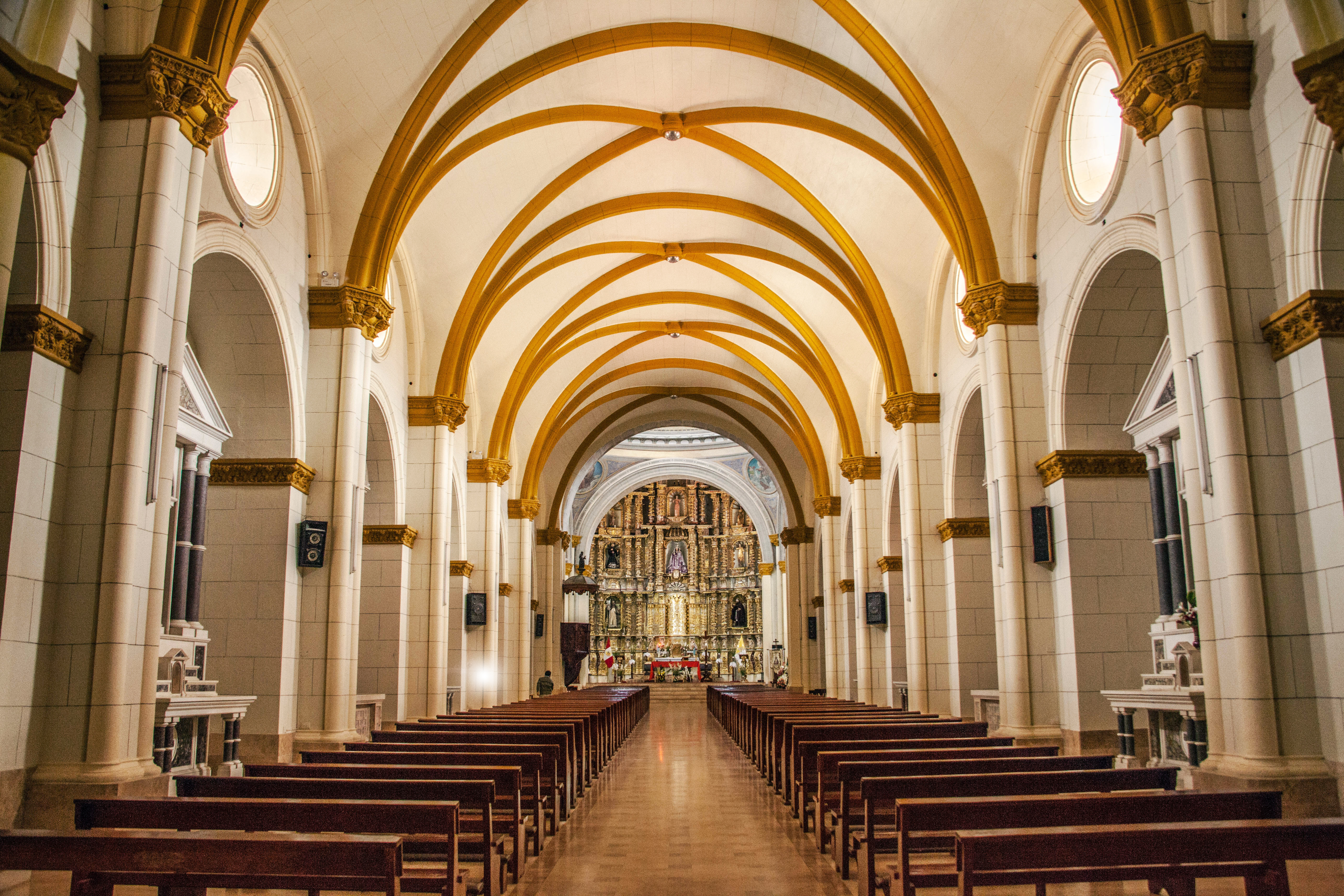
The main nave of the Iglesia Matriz.

=== Legend ===
In Spanish language, Jauja is also the name of the proverbial La Tierra de Jauja, "Land of Cockaigne" where people can live without having to work. Over time, in folk song and legend, the Valley of Jauja became associated with the Land of Cockaigne. However, it was the riches of the real Jauja at the time of the Spanish conquest that created this myth. The myths sometimes depict Jauja as an island and other times as a city in a mythical land. Along the Texas-Mexico border, La ciudad de Jauja is known as a comic folksong about the legend of Jauja as the "Land of Cockaigne".

The Legend of the Laguna de Paca, by Poet Laureate (of Jauja, and the Mantaro Valley), Dr. Dennis L. Siluk (2011)

In a related vein, Jauja is the setting for an episode of "Prisoners of the Sun", one of the books in the comics series on the Adventures of Tintin by the Belgian artist Hergé.

== High schools ==
- Colegio Estatal Industrial Integrado Juan Máximo Villar de Jauja (Ex 501)
- Colegio Nacional San José de Jauja
- Colegio Nuestra Señora del Carmen de Jauja
- Colegio San Vicente de Paul de Jauja
- Colegio Sagrado Corazon de Jesús
- Colegio Enrique F. Gómez Espinoza
- Colegio Juan Pablo II (private)
- Colegio San Agustín
- Colegio particular Jauja

== Transport ==
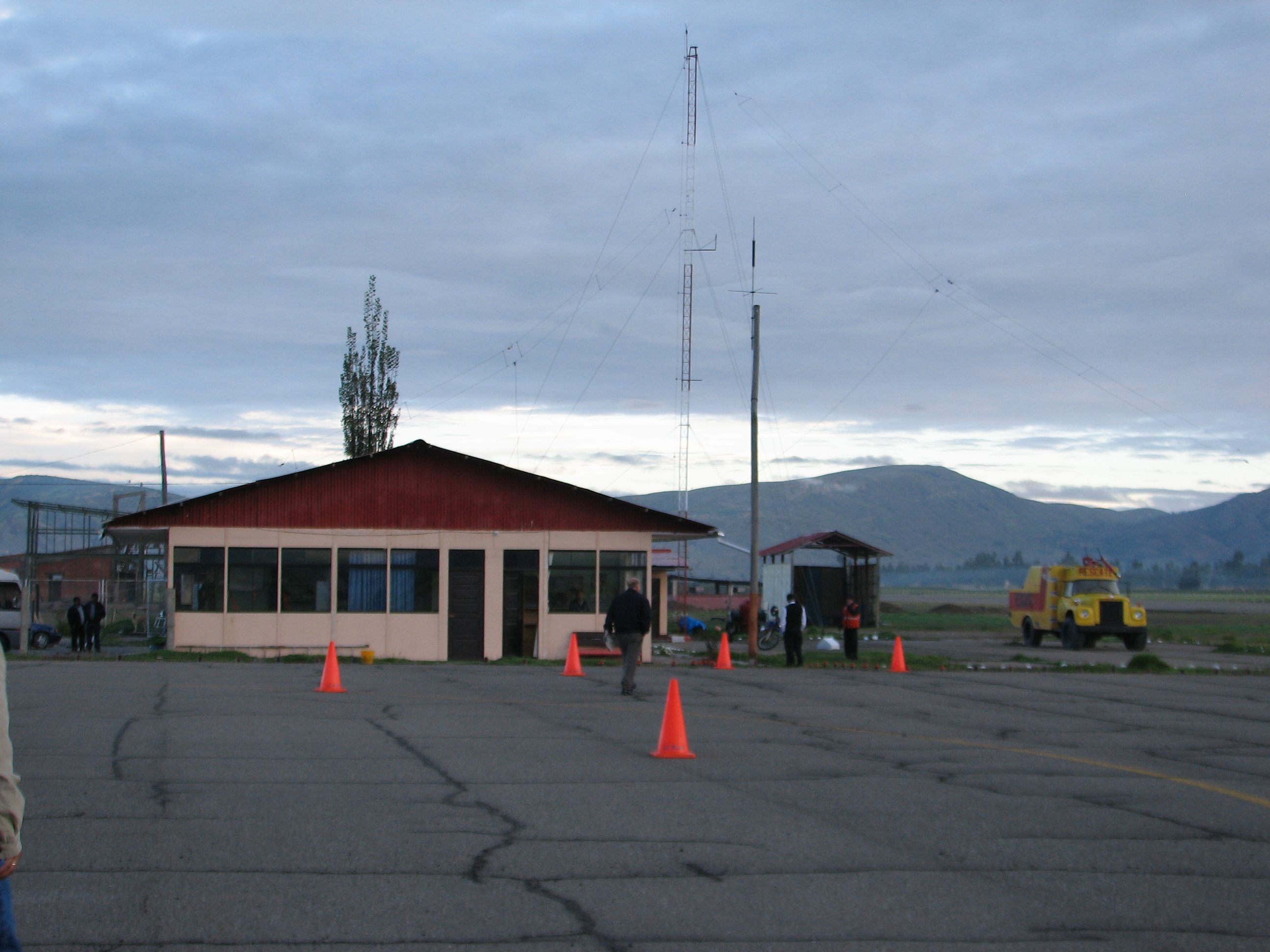
Francisco Carle Airport

Jauja is connected by highway to Lima and La Oroya. Jauja is the only city in the center of the country with an airport, Francisco Carle Airport. Jauja airport was officially recognized in 1995 and currently receives daily commercial flights. It is currently served by two airline carriers, LATAM and Sky. Most travelers to domestic and international destinations connect in Lima's Jorge Chávez International Airport.

== Notable people ==
- Clodoaldo Espinosa Bravo
- Hugo Orellana Bonilla
- Edgardo Rivera Martínez
