= Fokker F28 Fellowship =

Short range jet airliner produced 1967-1987

F28 Fellowship
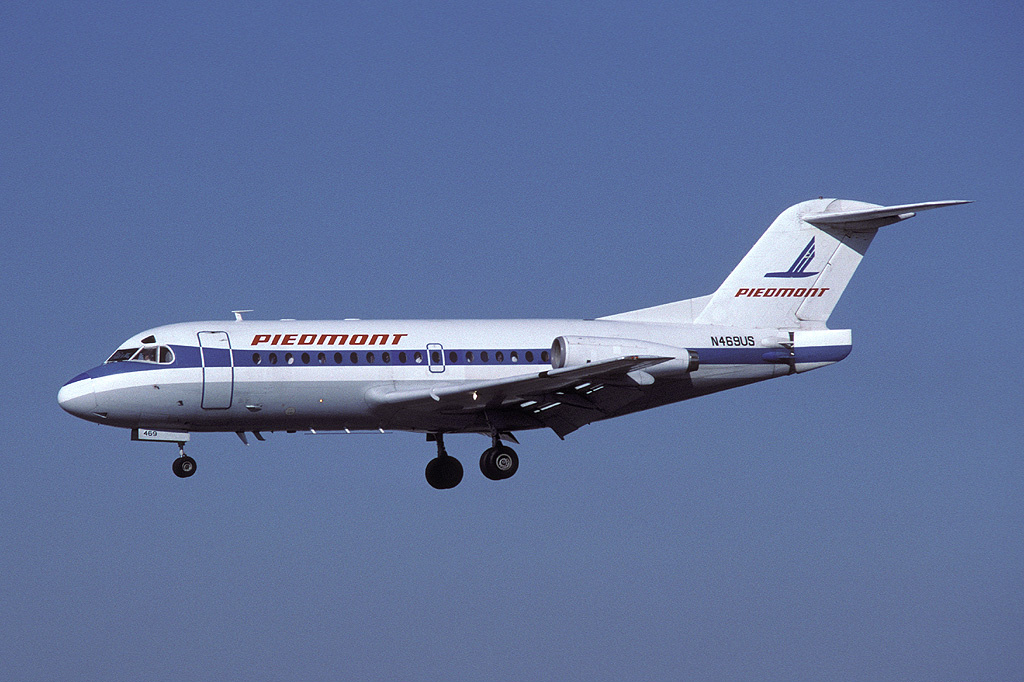
- A Piedmont F28-1000 on approach (1989)

General information
- Type: Regional jet
- National origin: Netherlands
- Manufacturer: Fokker
- Status: In very limited government service in Argentina (LADE)
- Primary users: Garuda Indonesia (historical) AirQuarius Aviation (historical); Linjeflyg (historical); Biman Bangladesh Airlines (historical)
- Number built: 241

History
- Manufactured: 1967–1987
- Introduction date: 28 March 1969 with Braathens SAFE
- First flight: 9 May 1967
- Variant: Fairchild 228
- Developed into: Fokker 70; Fokker 100

The Fokker F28 Fellowship is a twin-engined, short-range jet airliner designed and built by Dutch aircraft manufacturer Fokker.

Following the Fokker F27 Friendship, an early and commercially successful turboprop-powered regional airliner, Fokker decided to embark on developing a new turbofan-powered commuter aircraft that would build upon its experiences with the F27. During the design phase, a high level of attention was paid to market research and operator concerns; amongst other changes made, the prospective jetliner was increased in size, changing its maximum seating capacity from 50 to 65 passengers. During April 1962, Fokker announced the formal launch of the F28 Fellowship. The Fokker F28 directly competed with the American Douglas DC-9 and British BAC 1-11.

On 9 May 1967, the prototype F28-1000 conducted its maiden flight. On 24 February 1969, Kees van Meerten, Fokker Board member, received the Certificate of Airworthiness from Willem Jan Kruys, Director General of the Dutch National Aviation Authority. The first revenue-earning flight by Braathens was performed on 28 March 1969. Following its entry to service, Fokker developed multiple variants of the F28; one model, the F28-2000, featured an extended fuselage that could accommodate up to 79 passengers. A major revision was the F28-4000, which was powered by quieter Rolls-Royce Spey 555-15H engines, a redesigned cockpit, and a modified wing, and had a further increased seating capacity up to 85 passengers. During 1987, production of the type was terminated in favour of two newer derivatives, the Fokker 70 and the larger Fokker 100.

== Development ==
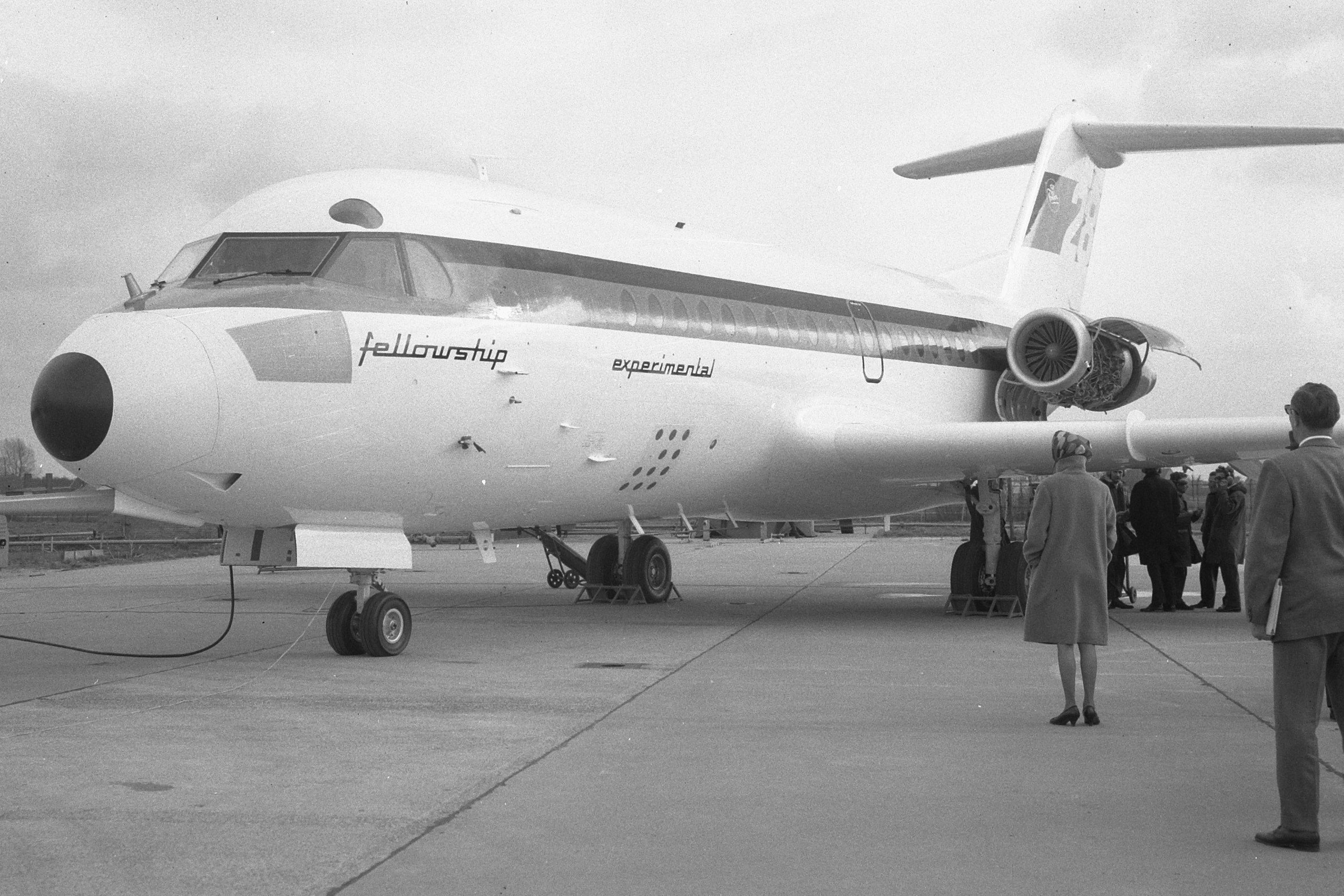
Prototype one month before its 9 May 1967 first flight

By 1960, Dutch aircraft manufacturer Fokker was engaged in multiple programmes; these included military aircraft such as the Bréguet Br.1150 Atlantic and the Lockheed F-104 Starfighter, as well as the commercially successful turboprop-powered F27 Friendship airliner. Around this time, British European Airways (BEA) released a specification that called for a high-speed regional airliner powered by turbofan engines. In response, Fokker took an interest in developing its own turbofan-powered short-haul airliner. According to aviation publication Flying, Fokker's prospective jetliner design was heavily shaped by feedback and experiences from its existing customers of the F27, particularly those in the crucial North American market. As such, American design methodologies and preferences were incorporated, reportedly emphasising simplicity, as well as efforts to minimise both language and trade barriers.

During April 1962, Dutch aircraft manufacturer Fokker announced the launch of the F28 Fellowship. The programme was a collaborative effort conducted between a number of European companies, namely Fokker itself, West German aerospace companies Messerschmitt-Bölkow-Blohm (MBB) and VFW-Fokker, and Short Brothers of Northern Ireland. Substantial government funding was also invested in the project; reportedly, the Dutch government provided 50% of Fokker's stake, while the West German government contributed 60% of the overall 35% German stake. Fokker had also approached several other aviation companies with offers of involvement, including France's Sud Aviation and Britain's Hawker Siddeley.

Initial design work centered on an aircraft capable of transport a maximum of 50 passengers across distances up to 1,650 km (1,025 mi), the design was later modified so that it could accommodate up to 65 seats in a five-abreast configuration, noticeably increasing its maximum takeoff weight, on the basis of market research. The enlarged aircraft was roughly comparable in capacity to that of the British Vickers Viscount, a successful turboprop airliner. The design was capable of speeds well in excess of turboprop-powered competitors, but retained a relatively low cruise speed in comparison to contemporary jet-powered designs, facilitating its use of a relatively straight low-mounted wing and achieving favourable low-speed characteristics as to enable the type's use from 85% of existing airports used by the F27 and the ubiquitous Douglas DC-3. According to Flying, the tentative airliner could achieve double the productivity of the preceding F27, while the company itself referred to the jetliner as a complement to its turboprop-powered sibling.

At one stage of development, Fokker had reportedly intended for the F28 to be powered by a pair of Bristol Siddeley BS.75 turbofans. However, when Fokker wanted to open contract negotiations, Bristol Siddeley told them that engine was no longer available as the market was too small when they lost the BAC 1-11 project. Rival British engine manufacturer Rolls-Royce, put forward their Rolls-Royce Spey Junior, a simplified version of the Rolls-Royce Spey. From the first prototype onwards the type would be exclusively powered by various models of the Spey engine.

The responsibility for both design and production of the F28 was divided between the partner companies. Fokker designed and built the nose section, centre fuselage, and inner wing; MBB/Fokker-VFW constructed the forward fuselage, rear fuselage, and tail assembly; while Shorts designed and produced the outer wings. Final assembly of the Fokker F28 was at Schiphol Airport in the Netherlands. At one point, American manufacturer Fairchild Aircraft had considered locally producing their own derivative of the F28, which was referred to as the Fairchild 228, but this ultimately did not reach production, with the company deciding to act as a distributor for the existing F28, instead. During 1987, production of the type was terminated in favour of two newer derivative airliners, the Fokker 70 and the larger 100; by this point, a total of 241 airframes had been constructed.

The F28-1000 prototype, registered PH-JHG, first flew on 9 May 1967, flown by Chief Test Pilot Jas Moll, Test Pilot Abe van der Schraaf, and Flight Engineer Cees Dik. Type certification from West German authorities was achieved on 24 February 1969, clearing the F28 to enter revenue service. While the first order for the type had been placed by German airline LTU, the first revenue-earning flight was conducted by Braathens, which eventually operated a fleet of five F28s, on 28 March 1969.

== Design ==
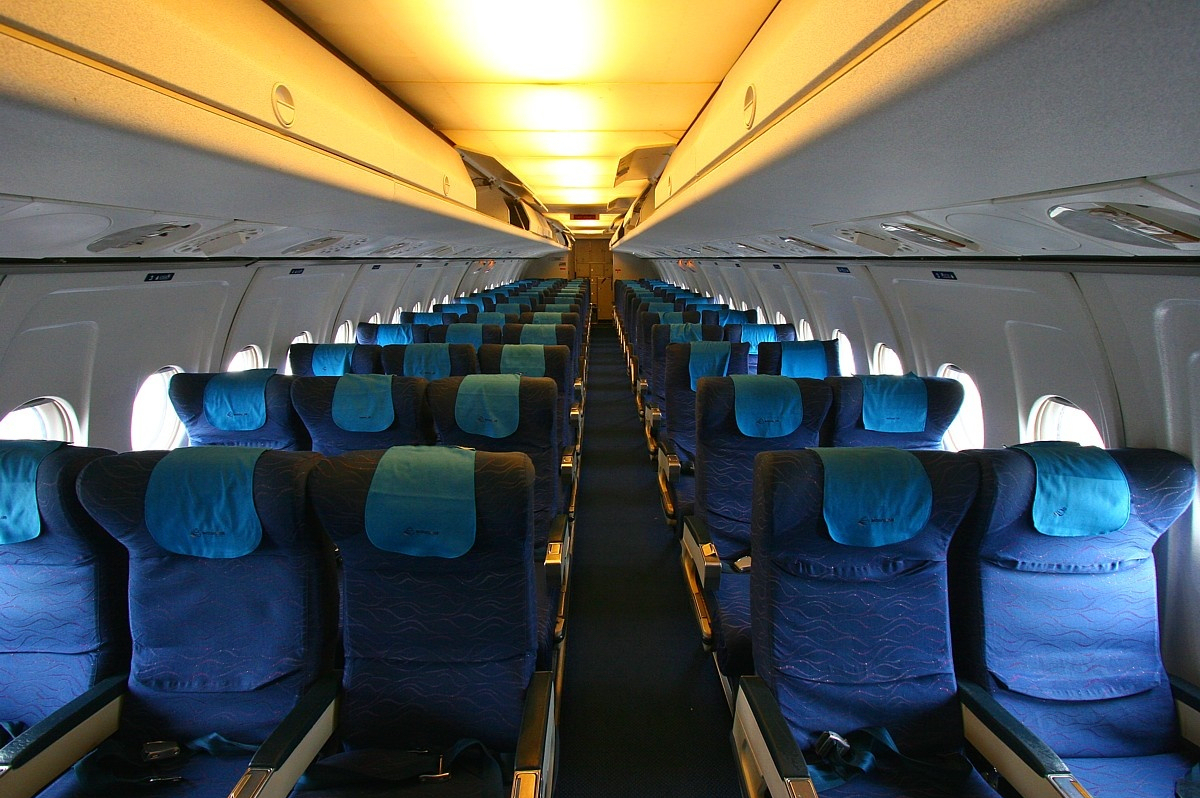
Five-abreast seating

The Fokker F28 Fellowship was a short-haul, twin-engined jetliner, sharing broad similarities to the British Aircraft Corporation's BAC One-Eleven built in the UK and the first-generation Douglas DC-9 built in the US in terms of basic configuration, featuring a T-tail and engines mounted at the rear of the fuselage. The choice of a low-mounted wing, amongst other benefits, somewhat shielded the tail-mounted engines from the threat of foreign object damage. Fuel is stored within both the outer wing and the fuselage; additional pylon-mounted tanks could be installed for extended range operations if so required. The structure, which features a fail-safe design, is constructed using the same bonding techniques previously pioneered for the F27.

The F28 was equipped with wings that had a slight crescent angle of sweep. It uses conventional box construction, being built in two pieces separately spliced onto the fuselage. The wing was furnished with ailerons positioned near the tips, along with simplistic flaps that would be supplemented by the ailerons during landing approaches; all of the flight control surfaces were actuated via duplicated cabling and (except for the rudder) aerodynamically balanced. It was also fitted with a five-section lift-dumper that would only be operated after landing, it was decided to employ a lift-dumper rather than alternatives such as thrust reversers, as the designers felt that this arrangement would result in a reduction in both weight and maintenance workload. Excluding the use of thrust reversers also meant that the chance of the engines ingesting debris was lessened when being operated upon unpaved airstrips. The wing also had a fixed leading edge (although one experimental model had leading edge slats and these were offered as an option) and was deiced via bleed air drawn from the engines.

The F28 is powered by a pair of Rolls-Royce Spey turbofan engines; dependent on model, these would be were capable of generating up to 9,850 lbf (43.9 kN) of thrust. While the feature was available at the time, Fokker chose not to equip the engines of early F28s with a water-methanol injection system, as they determined that the engines already possessed sufficient performance even when being flown under hot-and-high conditions. Most onboard systems are designed with simplicity in terms of operability and serviceability. However, the F28 was outfitted with comparatively advanced electronics, as Fokker's design team viewed this factor as directly relating to overall competitiveness.

One uncommon feature of the F28 was the movable split-sections installed on the tail cone; these would be hydraulically opened outwards to act as a variable air brake. A similar approach had also been used on the contemporaneous Blackburn Buccaneer strike fighter and on the later-built British Aerospace 146 regional airliner. The design is unique in that it not only slows the aircraft down rapidly, but also it can aid in rapid descents from economic cruising altitudes and also allowed the engines to be set at higher speeds, which helped eliminate lag time. This means the engines respond faster if needed for sudden speed increases or go-arounds on the approach to landing. The Fellowship had a retractable tricycle landing gear, which used large, low-pressure tyres, enabling the use of unpaved airstrips. The use of antiskid brakes on the main wheels of the undercarriage also contributed to a shorter landing run.

== Variants ==
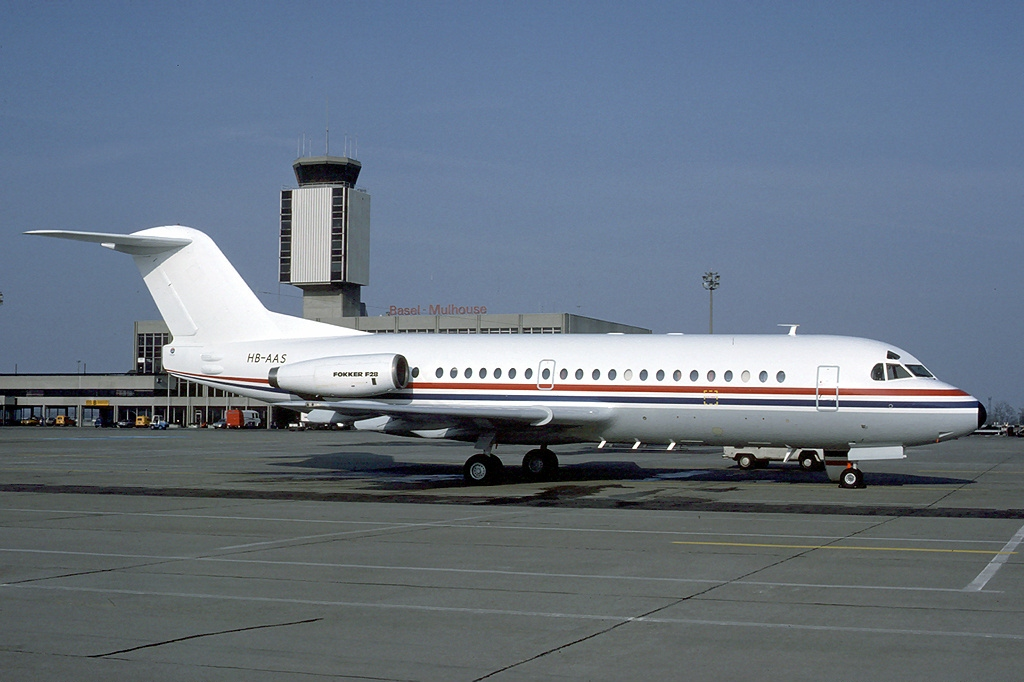
The Mk 2000 has a 87 in (2.2 m) longer fuselage

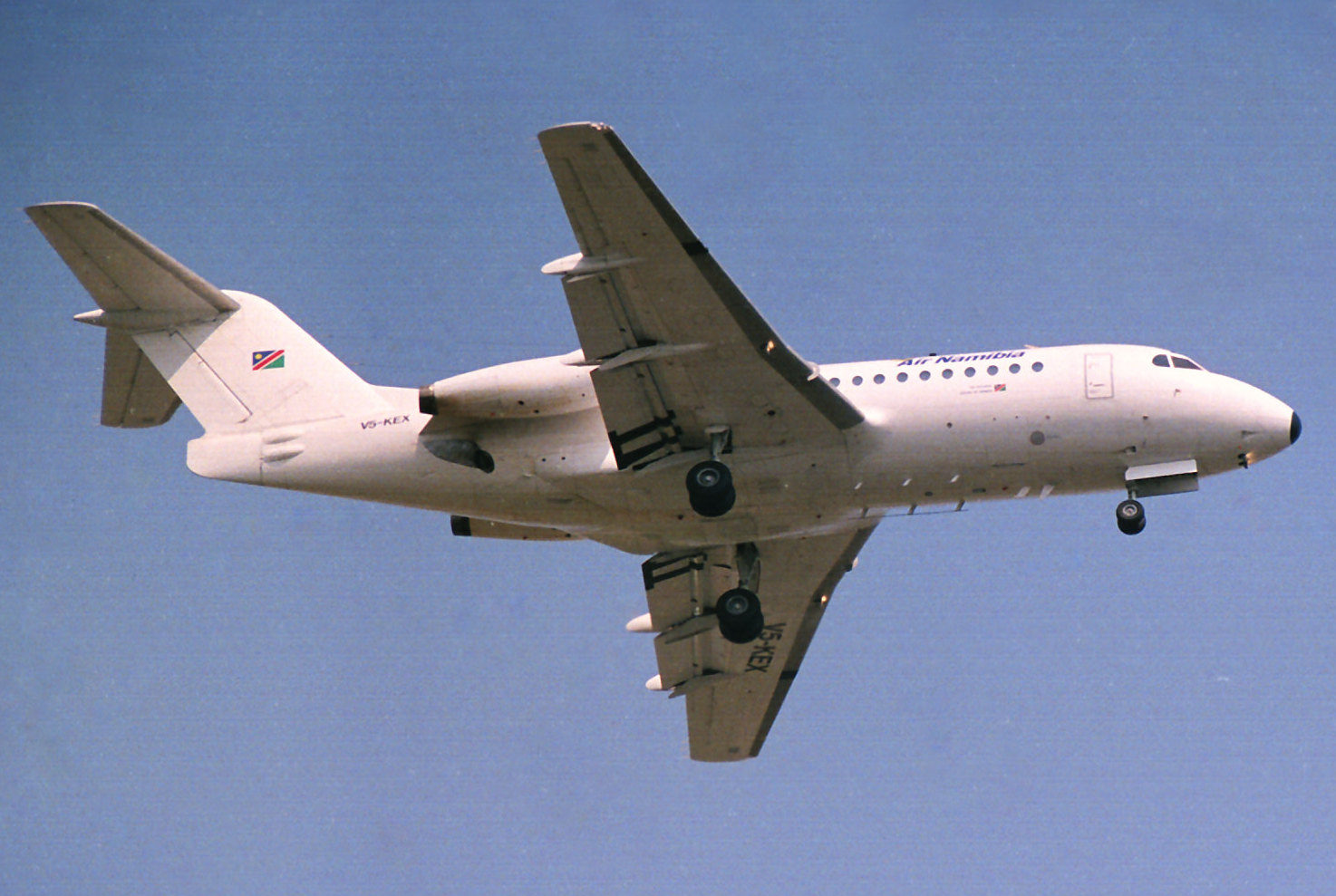
The Mk 3000 has the Mk 4000 wider wing and the Mk 1000 shorter fuselage

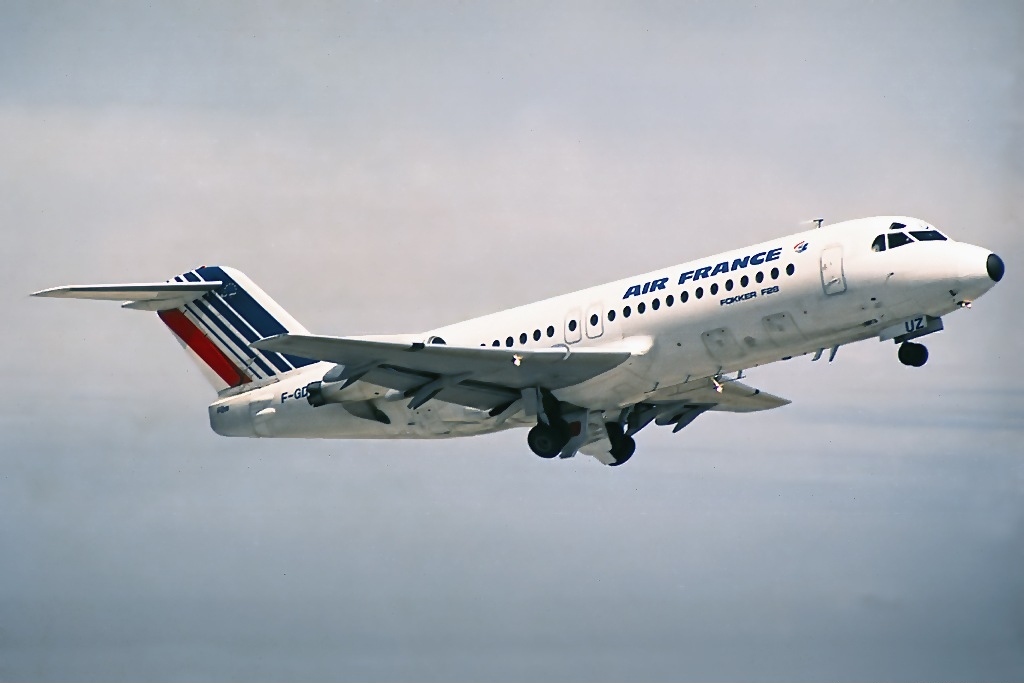
The Mk 4000 has the Mk 2000 longer fuselage with double overwing exits and a 60 in (1.5 m) wider wing

A variant of the F28, equipped with an extended fuselage, was named F28-2000; this model could seat up to 79 passengers instead of the 65 seats on the F28-1000. The prototype for this model was a converted F28-1000 prototype, and first flew on 28 April 1971. The models F28-6000 and -5000 were modified models of the F28-2000 and F28-1000, respectively; the main features of these models was the addition of slats, a greater wingspan, and the adoption of more powerful and quieter engines. Both the F28-6000 and -5000 failed to become commercial successes; only two F28-6000s and no F28-5000s were ultimately built. After being used by Fokker for a time, the F28-6000s were sold to Air Mauritanie, but not before being converted to F28-2000 standards.

Perhaps the most successful model of the F28 was the F28-4000, which debuted on 20 October 1976 with one of the world's largest Fokker operators, Linjeflyg. This version was powered by quieter Spey 555-15H engines, and had an increased seating capacity (up to 85 passengers), a larger wingspan with reinforced wings, a new cockpit, and a new "wide-look" interior featuring enclosed overhead lockers and a less 'tubular' look. The F28-3000, the successor to the F28-1000, featured the same improvements as the F28-4000.

F.28 Mk 1000 (F28-1000)
With a maximum capacity of 70 passengers, it was approved on 24 February 1969, the 1000C had a main-deck large cargo door.

F.28 Mk 2000 (F28-2000)
A Mark 1000 with a fuselage stretch of 57 in (1.4 m) in front of and 30 in (0.76 m) aft of the wing, 79 maximum passengers, it was approved on 30 August 1972. Though it first flew on 28 April 1971, and successfully began revenue service with Nigeria Airways in October 1971, only 10 were built.

F.28 Mk 3000 (F28-3000)
A Mark 1000 with a 60 in (1.5 m) wingspan extension, it was approved on 19 July 1978, with a 3000C variant with a large main-deck cargo door. A successful variant, featuring greater structural strength and increased fuel capacity, it began revenue service with Garuda Indonesian Airways(since 1986 Garuda Indonesia).

F.28 Mk 4000 (F28-4000)
Approved on 13 December 1976, it is built on the longer Mark 2000, with two overwing exits on both sides, a 60 in (1,500 mm) wingspan extension, and capacity for 85 passengers. The first prototype appeared on 20 October 1976 and it began service with Linjeflyg (Sweden) at the end of the year.

=== Undeveloped variants ===
F.28 Mk 5000 (F28-5000)
This was to combine the shorter fuselage of the Mk 1000/3000 and an increased wingspan. Leading edge slats were to be added to the wings and more powerful Rolls-Royce RB183 Mk555-15H engines were to be used. Although expected to be an excellent plane to operate on short runways due to its superior power, the project was abandoned.

F.28 Mk 6000 (F28-6000)
It first flew on 27 September 1973, and had the longer fuselage of the Mk 2000/4000 with an increased wingspan and leading edge slats. It was certified in the Netherlands on 30 October 1975. Two were built by 1976.

F.28 Mk 6600 (F28-6600)
Proposed version, not built

Fairchild 228
Proposed 50-seat American version to be assembled by Fairchild-Hiller with Rolls-Royce RB.203 Trent engines. The project was cancelled.

== Operators ==
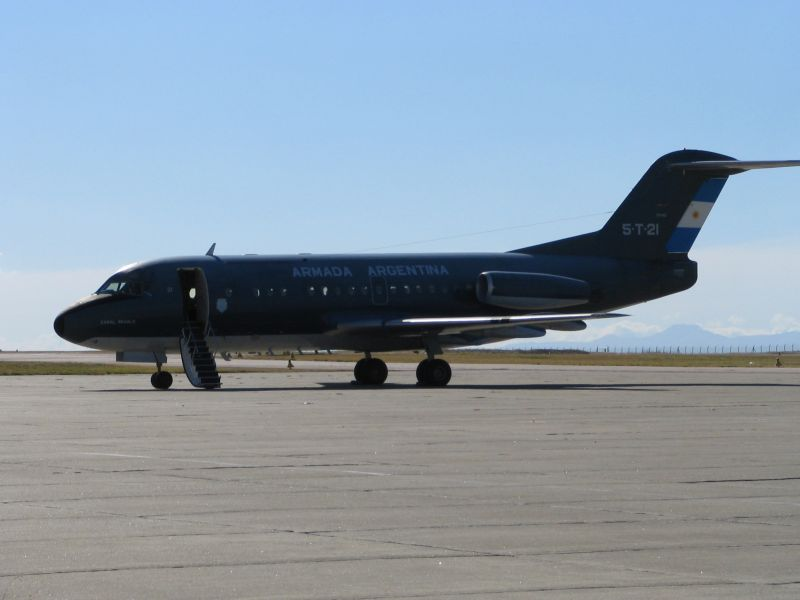
Argentine Naval Aviation Fokker F28, one of the last in service.

By 2019, no Fokker F28 aircraft remained in civil service (LADE mentioned below is organizationally part of the Argentine Air Force). Fly-SAX was the last airline operator of the F28 worldwide with the last aircraft in service stored in September 2019 due to lack of flight crew.

Garuda Indonesia had the most F28s, with 62 of the aircraft in the former fleet. All have since been retired. Major operators included:Time Air/Canadian Regional (35 - second and third hand) MacRobertson Miller Airlines, Ansett Group Australia (more than 15), Aerolineas Argentinas (5), Toumaï Air Tchad (1), AirQuarius Aviation (3), SkyLink Arabia (1), Satena (1), Gatari Air Service (2), LADE (1), AirQuarius Aviation (4), Merpati Nusantara Airlines (1), and Biman Bangladesh Airlines (4). Some 22 airlines operated smaller numbers of the type. The F28s of Ansett Transport Industries' intrastate airline, MacRobertson Miller Airlines (MMA) of Western Australia, flew the longest nonstop F28 route in the world, from Perth to Kununurra, in Western Australia – a distance of about 2,240 km (1,392 mi). This was also the world's longest twin-jet route at the time.

In late 2025, the World Air Forces publication by FlightGlobal, which tracks the aircraft inventories of world's air forces and publishes its counts annually, published the World Air Forces 2026 report. According to that report, there were no F28 aircraft in service in any air force (or other military unit) of the world. The World Air Forces 2026 report does not however list the aircraft of the LADE, and indeed Argentina, through LADE, is the last operator of F28 Fellowship aircraft.

The last 2 F28 in service (as of 2025) are operated by Argentina's LADE, an Argentinian governmental airline that is part of the Argentine Air Force (and thus variously classified as civilian or military or governmental or all of the above).

=== Military/government operators ===
Argentina

- LADE (2 as of August 2024; being replaced in service by Embraer ERJ 140 and retired)

== Accidents and incidents ==
The F28 currently has the highest hull loss rate of any current commercial airliner, not including airplanes manufactured in the Commonwealth of Independent States, the Union of Soviet Socialist Republics (USSR), or the People’s Republic of China (PRC) due to lack of operational data. At a rate of 4.62 per million flights, it is comparatively higher than aircraft of its generation, including the Boeing 737-100/200 and DC-9, which have hull loss rates of 1.78 and 1.45 respectively.

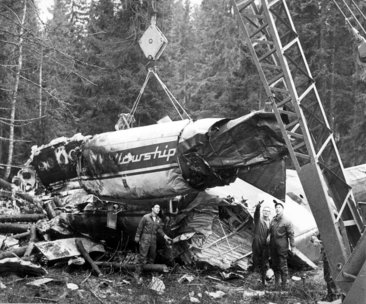
Wreckage of Braathens SAFE Flight 239

The following is a list of Fokker F28 accidents and incidents:

- Braathens SAFE Flight 239 – 23 December 1972, (Asker, suburb of Oslo, Norway): 41 fatalities, 4 survivors - 40 immediately from the crash, and 1 in 1976 from injuries originally caused by the crash. First fatal crash of a Fokker Fellowship.
- Itavia Flight 897 – 1 January 1974, (Caselle Torinese, airport of Turin, Italy): 38 fatalities, 4 survivors. Flight IH897 from Cagliari to Geneva with intermediate stops in Bologna and Turin, crashed about 2 miles south of Runway 36 while attempting to land in fog. Airplane involved was registered I-TIDE.
- Turkish Airlines Flight 301 – 26 January 1974, (İzmir, Turkey): 67 fatalities, 6 survivors. The aircraft crashed 100 m (330 ft) away from the airfield during takeoff because of icing and over-rotation.
- Turkish Airlines Flight 345 – 30 January 1975 (Istanbul, Turkey) 42 fatalities. The aircraft crashed into the Marmara Sea on its second approach. The first approach failed when a power outage caused the runway lights to fail. Cause of the accident is unknown.
- Garuda Indonesia Airways Flight 150 – 24 September 1975, (Palembang, Indonesia): 26 fatalities. Crashed on approach in fog killing 25 people out of 61 passengers and crew. 1 person was killed on the ground.
- 1979 Ankara Turkish Airlines crash – 23 December 1979, (Ankara, Turkey): 41 fatalities, 4 survivors. Crashed into the side of a hill as a result of the crew deviating from the localizer course while on an ILS approach.
- 1979 Garuda Indonesia crash. – 11 July 1979, (Medan, Indonesia): 61 fatalities. Crashed into Mount Sibayak while on approach to Polonia International Airport. There was bad weather at the time of the crash.
- NLM CityHopper Flight 431 – 6 October 1981 (Moerdijk, Netherlands): 17 fatalities and 1 on ground, the aircraft flew into a tornado which broke off one of the wings.
- Garuda Indonesia Domestic Flight – 20 March 1982, runway overrun at Tanjung Karang-Branti Airport in bad weather, 27 fatalities.
- Nigeria Airways Flight 250 – 28 November 1983 (Enugu, Nigeria): 53 fatalities, 19 survivors. Controlled flight into terrain in poor weather.
- 1985 SATENA Fokker F-28 crash – 28 March 1985 (Florence, Colombia): 46 Fatalities. Crashed into a mountain due to bad weather.
- Air Ontario Flight 1363 – 10 March 1989 (Dryden, Ontario, Canada): 24 fatalities, 45 survivors. Due to various factors including snow, ice and lack of use of anti-icing measures.
- Korean Air Flight 175 - 25 November 1989 (Gimpo, South Korea) The plane was on a regularly scheduled flight from Seoul to Ulsan, improper flight preparation caused wing icing which, in turn, caused the number one engine to lose power on take-off. The pilot immediately lost directional control and aborted the take-off. However, the abort was so abrupt that the aircraft overran the runway and exploded in flames. The airframe was not salvageable after the fire was eventually extinguished and was written off. No one died in the crash.
- USAir Flight 405 – 22 March 1992 (Queens, New York, United States): 27 fatalities, 24 survivors. Due to ice buildup on the wings, pilot error and improper deicing procedures at LaGuardia airport
- Merpati Nusantara Airlines Flight 724 – 1 June 1993, (Sorong, Indonesia): 41 fatalities, 2 survivors. Controlled flight Into terrain - The aircraft crashed onto a rocky beach on Bad Weather Landing procedures at Jefman Airport
- Iran Aseman Airlines Flight 746 – 12 October 1994, (near Natanz, Iran): 66 fatalities. Both engines lost power and shut down due to contaminated fuel, causing uncontrolled descent.
- Air Mauritanie Flight 625 – 1 July 1994, (Tidjikja, Mauritania): 80 fatalities, 13 survivors. The plane crashed at Tidjikja Airport as a result of a hard landing during a sandstorm.
- Trigana Air Service flight – 28 October 1997, (Tangerang, Indonesia): The plane returned to land at Jakarta–Soekarno–Hatta International Airport after the aircraft experienced technical problems two minutes after takeoff. Smoke and severe heat had entered the cockpit and the passenger cabin. The airplane sustained damage due to the heat.
- TANS Peru Flight 222 – 9 January 2003, (Chachapoyas, Peru): 46 fatalities. The aircraft crashed into a hill on approach to Chachapoyas Airport.
- TAME Flight 120 – 17 January 2003, (Quito, Ecuador): Fokker F28 operating a flight from Mariscal Sucre Airport to Cali, Colombia, suffered a runway excursion after takeoff was aborted due to a tire blowout. The nose gear collapsed, and the aircraft came to rest 81 metres (266 ft) past the runway threshold and into the runway safety area. There were no injuries, but the aircraft was written off.
- Icaro Air Flight 504 – 22 September 2008, (Quito, Ecuador): F28-4000 on a flight from Mariscal Sucre International Airport to Francisco de Orellana Airport, aborted takeoff due to an alarm fire in the front cargo compartment. The plane could not stop in time, went off the runway, hit the ILS antenna at the north end of the Mariscal Sucre International Airport runway, went off the runway safety area and hit a brick wall before stopping. There were no fatalities among the 62 passengers and 4 crew members, and the airframe was written off.

== Aircraft on display ==
Argentina

- 11028 - F28-1000C registered T-03 at the Museo Nacional de Aeronautica de Argentina in Morón, Buenos Aires in VIP livery of Argentinian Government, named 'Tte. Gral. Juan Domingo Peron'.
- 11145 - F28-3000C registered 0741 / 5-T-20 of the Armada de la República Argentina (Argentinian Navy) in the Museo Nacional de Malvinas in Oliva, Córdoba, Argentina.

Indonesia

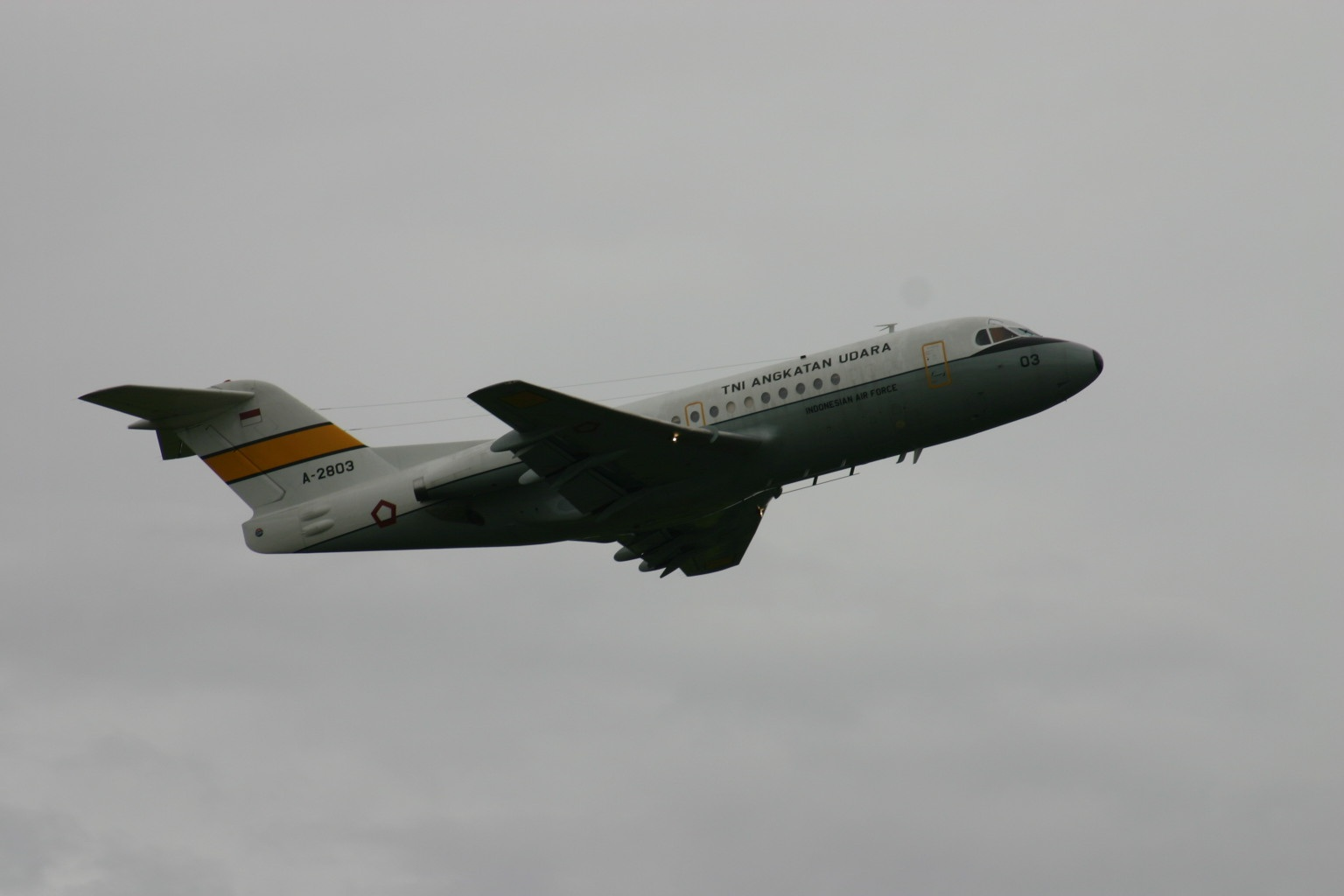
Indonesian Air Force F28-3000 A-2803 in 2004

- 11117 – F28-3000 registered A-2803 on static display at Halim Perdanakusuma Air Force Base, Jakarta in Indonesian Air Force VIP livery.
- 11175 – F28-4000 registered PK-MGJ preserved as a cinema in Baturraden, Central Java.
- 11211 – F28-4000 registered PK-GKV on static display as an attraction in Magelang, Central Java.

• Unknown-F-28-4000 Registered A- 2801 new arrival static display at Dirgantara Aviation Museum in Yogyakarta, Central Java

- 11114 – F28-4000 registered XY-ADW preserved as a bar at the Sky Palace Hotel in Naypyidaw.
- 11161 – F28-4000 registered XY-AGH at the Defence Services Museum, Naypyidaw in Myanma Airways livery.
- 11232 – F28-4000 registered XY-AGA at the Civil Aviation Training Institute, Yangon International Airport, Yangon.

Norway

- 11009 – F28-1000 registered LN-SUC at the Norwegian Aviation Museum, Bodø in Braathens SAFE livery.

United States

- 11016 – F28-1000 registered N500WN at Wayne Newton's Casa de Shenandoah, Las Vegas, Nevada.

== Specifications ==
Variant	-1000	-2000	-4000	-3000
Seating (Note: 5-abreast, 31 in / 79 cm pitch)	65	79	85	65
Hold	459 cu ft / 13 m³	559 cu ft / 15.9 m³		459 cu ft / 13 m³
Length	89 ft 11 in / 27.4 m	97 ft 2 in / 29.6 m		89 ft 11 in / 27.4 m
Height	27 ft 9.5 in / 8.47 m			
Wingspan	77 ft 4 in / 23.6 m		82 ft 3 in / 25.07 m	
Wing	822 ft² / 76.4 m², 16° sweep, 7.3:1 AR		850 ft² / 79 m², 16° sweep, 8:1 AR	
Max takeoff weight	65,000 lb / 29,480 kg		73,000 lb / 33,110 kg	
Empty weight	35,517 lb / 16,144 kg	36,953 lb / 16,707 kg	38,825 lb / 17,611 kg	37,139 lb / 16,846 kg
Max payload	18,983 lb / 8,629 kg	17,547 lb / 7,976 kg	23,317 lb / 10,556 kg	19,003 lb / 8,620 kg
Max Fuel	2,869 Imp Gal / 13,040 L / 3,445 US Gal			
2× Turbofans	Rolls-Royce Spey Mk 555-15		Rolls-Royce Spey Mk 555-15H	
Unit thrust	9,850 lbf / 43.9 kN			
Cruise	501 mph / 458 kn / 848 km/h Max, 413 mph / 359 kn / 666 km/h LR		527 mph / 436 kn / 808 km/h Max, 407 mph / 354 kn / 656 km/h LR	
Fuel Consumption	6,180 lb/h / 2,800 kg/h Max, 3,260 lb/h / 1,480 kg/h LR		4,980 lb/h / 2,260 kg/h Max, 3,252 lb/h / 1,475 kg/h LR	
Range (max payload)	1,058 mi / 920 nmi / 1,705 km		1,035 mi / 900 nmi / 1,668 km	1,783 mi / 1,550 nmi / 2,872 km
Takeoff (MTOW, ISA, SL)	5,500 ft / 1,676 m			
Landing (MLW, SL)	3,540 ft / 1,079 m		3,495 ft / 1,065 m	3,173 ft / 967 m
Service ceiling	35,000 ft (10,700 m)			

== See also ==
Related development

- Fokker 70
- Fokker 100

Aircraft of comparable role, configuration, and era

- BAC One-Eleven
- McDonnell Douglas DC-9
- Tupolev Tu-134
- Sud Aviation Caravelle

Related lists

- List of jet airliners
