= 1979 Ankara Turkish Airlines F28 crash =

Air Crash in 1979 including a Turkish F-28

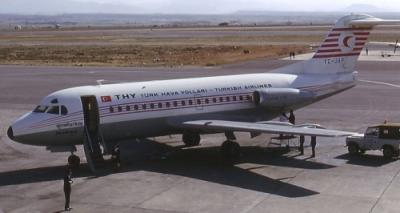
- A Turkish Airlines Fokker F28 similar to the one involved. This aircraft crashed four years earlier.

Accident
- Date: December 23, 1979
- Summary: Controlled flight into terrain due to diversion from ILS followed by extreme turbulence
- Site: Kuyumcuköy, Ankara, Turkey; 40.32947°N 33.15708°E

Aircraft
- Aircraft type: Fokker F28 Fellowship 1000
- Aircraft name: Trabzon
- Operator: Turkish Airlines
- Registration: TC-JAT
- Flight origin: Samsun Airport, Samsun, Turkey
- Destination: Esenboğa International Airport, Ankara, Turkey
- Passengers: 41
- Crew: 4
- Fatalities: 41
- Injuries: 4
- Survivors: 4

On December 23, 1979, a Turkish Airlines Fokker F28 Fellowship 1000 airliner, registration TC-JAT, named Trabzon, on a domestic passenger flight from Samsun Airport to Esenboğa International Airport in Ankara, flew into the side of a hill 1,400 m (4,600 ft) near the village of Kuyumcuköy in Çubuk district of Ankara Province, 32 km (20 mi) north-northeast of the destination airport on approach to landing.

The crew had deviated from the localizer course while on an ILS approach experiencing severe turbulence.

== Crew and passengers ==
The aircraft had 41 passengers and four crew on board; 38 passengers and three crew were killed in the accident.

== Aircraft ==
The aircraft, a Fokker F28 Fellowship 1000 with two Rolls-Royce RB183-2 "Spey" Mk555-15 turbofan jet engines, was built by Fokker with manufacturer serial number 11071, and made its first flight in 1973.
