= Fairchild 228 =

Regional airliner

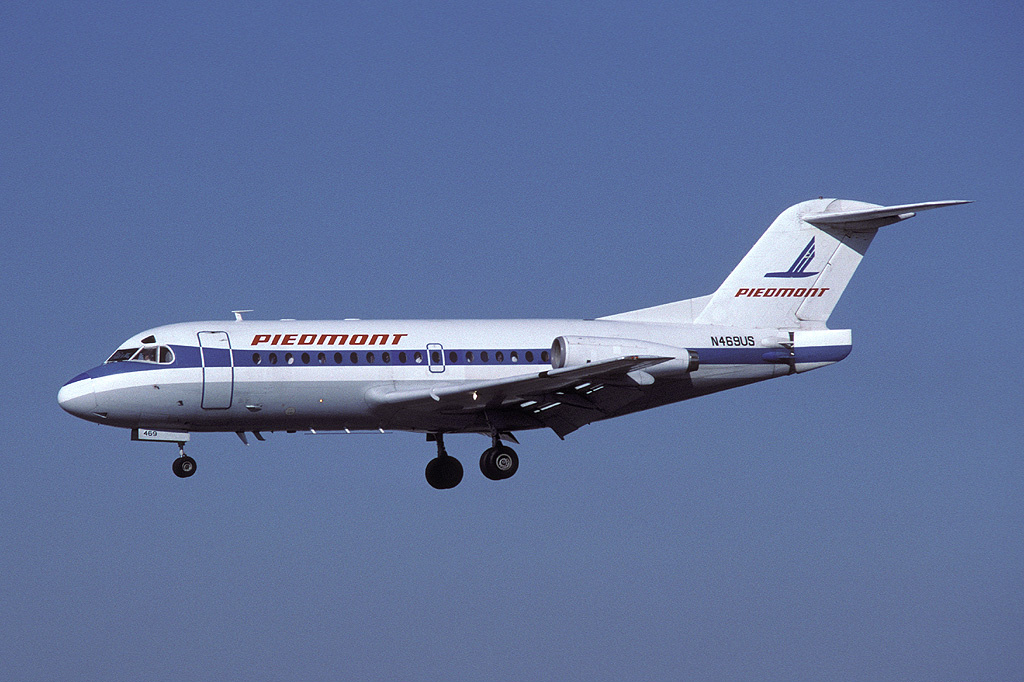
- A Fokker F-28, the basis for the shortened Fairchild 228

General information
- Type: Regional airliner
- National origin: United States / Netherlands
- Manufacturer: Fairchild Aircraft / Fokker
- Number built: 2

History
- Developed from: Fokker F28 Fellowship

The Fairchild 228 was a regional jet developed for the United States market by Fairchild Hiller using Fokker F28 sub-assemblies.

== Design and development ==
In 1967 Fairchild-Hiller sought to develop their own regional jet, the FH-327. Fairchild elected to leverage their relationship with Fokker aircraft in building F.27 aircraft, with a similar arrangement. The plan was to purchase sub-assemblies for the then new F.28 regional jet and assemble them in America into a shortened configuration aircraft with different engines.

The Fairchild 228 was to be a 50-passenger twin-engine turbofan regional aircraft. The engines were mounted on the rear of the fuselage, with a swept T-tail arrangement. The wings were equipped with triple-slotted flaps for short-field operations. A new 10,000 lb (4,536 kg) thrust Rolls-Royce RB.203 Trent turbofan was selected to power the aircraft.

Fairchild estimated orders of 260-460 aircraft for the US market and 600-800 Internationally. The first sub-assemblies were shipped to Hagerstown, Maryland in 1967 with two prototype aircraft assembled for testing. The first order was placed by West Coast Airlines of Seattle, Washington. Tests of the F.28 aircraft's short field performance was better than expected with simpler flap construction. The Trent engines performance uncertainty and delayed certification of the 228 compared to the F.28 led to the 1968 announcement that the project would be halted. Fairchild wrote off nearly $30 million in expenses in 1968 relating to canceling the F-228 program. The losses contributed to Fairchild's canceled plan to acquire Douglas aircraft. The tail sections were shipped back to Fokker and used in production F.28 aircraft.

== Specifications (228) ==
Data from AAHS Journal

General characteristics

- Capacity: 50
- Length: 86 ft 8 in (26.42 m)
- Wingspan: 78 ft 9 in (24.00 m)
- Height: 27 ft 8 in (8.43 m)
- Wing area: 822 sq ft (76.4 m^{2})
- Empty weight: 46,300 lb (21,001 kg)
- Gross weight: 54,000 lb (24,494 kg)
- Max takeoff weight: 54,500 lb (24,721 kg)
- Fuel capacity: 2,606 U.S. gallons (9,860 L; 2,170 imp gal)
- Powerplant: 2 × Rolls-Royce RB.203 Trent turbofan, 9,730 lbf (43.3 kN) thrust each

Performance

- Cruise speed: 430 kn (490 mph, 800 km/h)
- Stall speed: 81 kn (93 mph, 150 km/h)
- Range: 350 nmi (403 mi, 649 km)
- Service ceiling: 35,000 ft (11,000 m)
- Rate of climb: 2,970 ft/min (15.1 m/s)

Avionics

- Collins
