= Icaro Air =

Airline based in Quito, Ecuador

IATA	ICAO	Call sign
X8	ICD	ICARO
- Founded: September 21, 1971
- Ceased operations: June 20, 2011
- Hubs: Old Mariscal Sucre International Airport
- Fleet size: 5
- Destinations: 11
- Headquarters: Quito, Ecuador
- Website: http://www.icaro.aero/

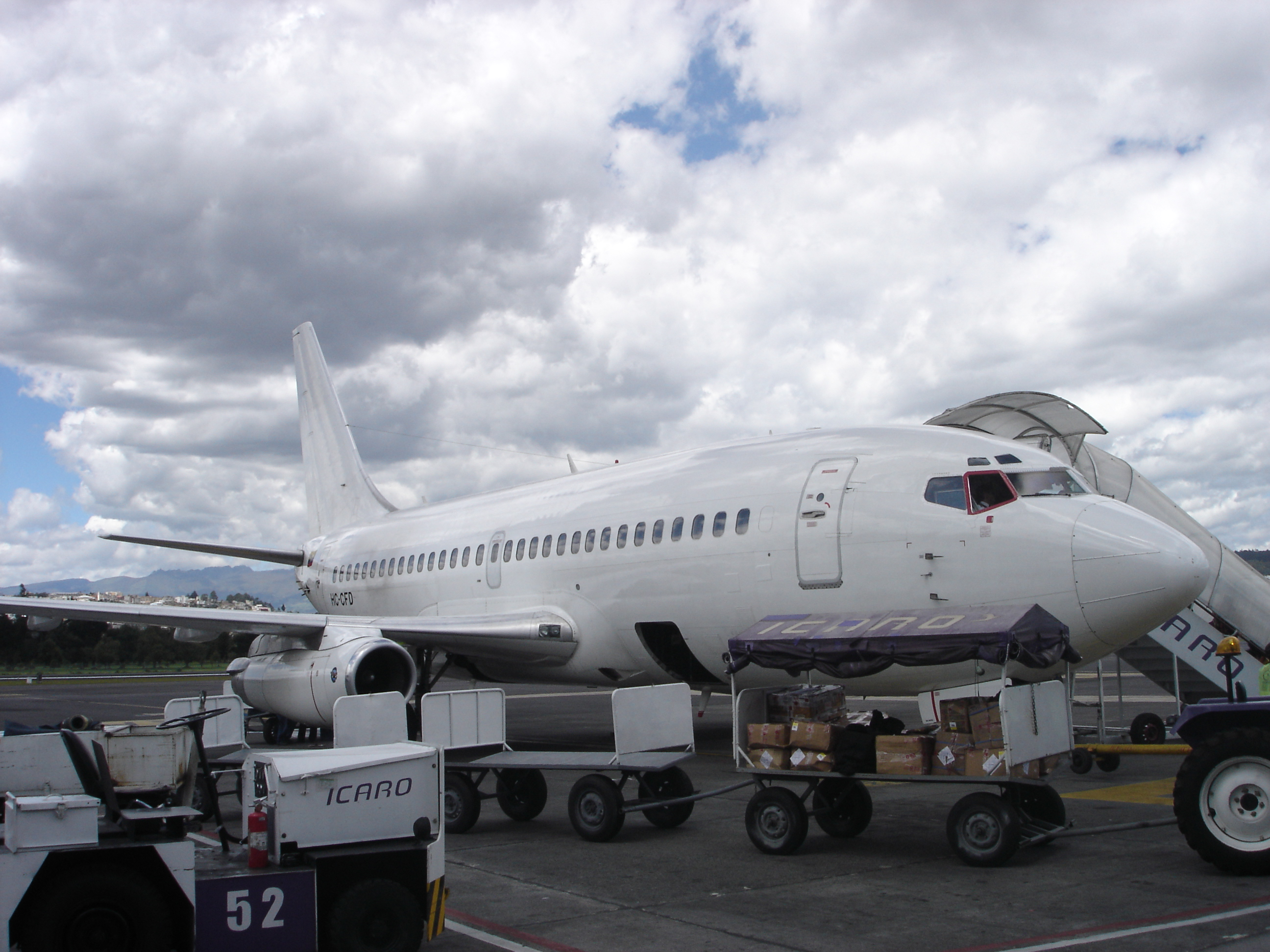
Icaro Air

Icaro Air was an airline based in Quito, Ecuador. Its main base was Mariscal Sucre International Airport, Quito.

Founded in 1971, Icaro operated domestic passenger service under Icaro Express.

== History ==
=== Early and later operations ===
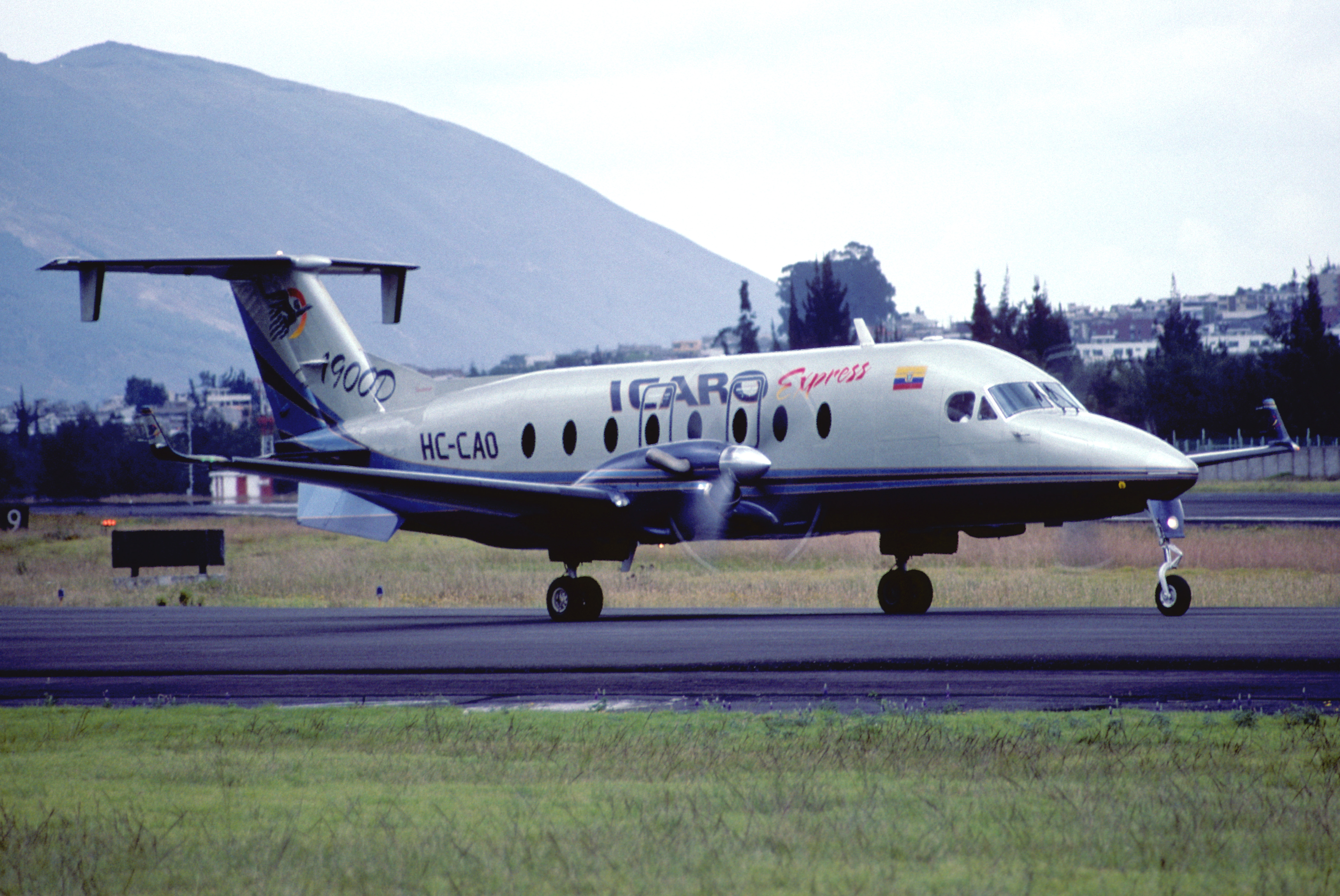
An Icaro Air Beechcraft 1900D at the Old Mariscal Sucre International Airport in 2002

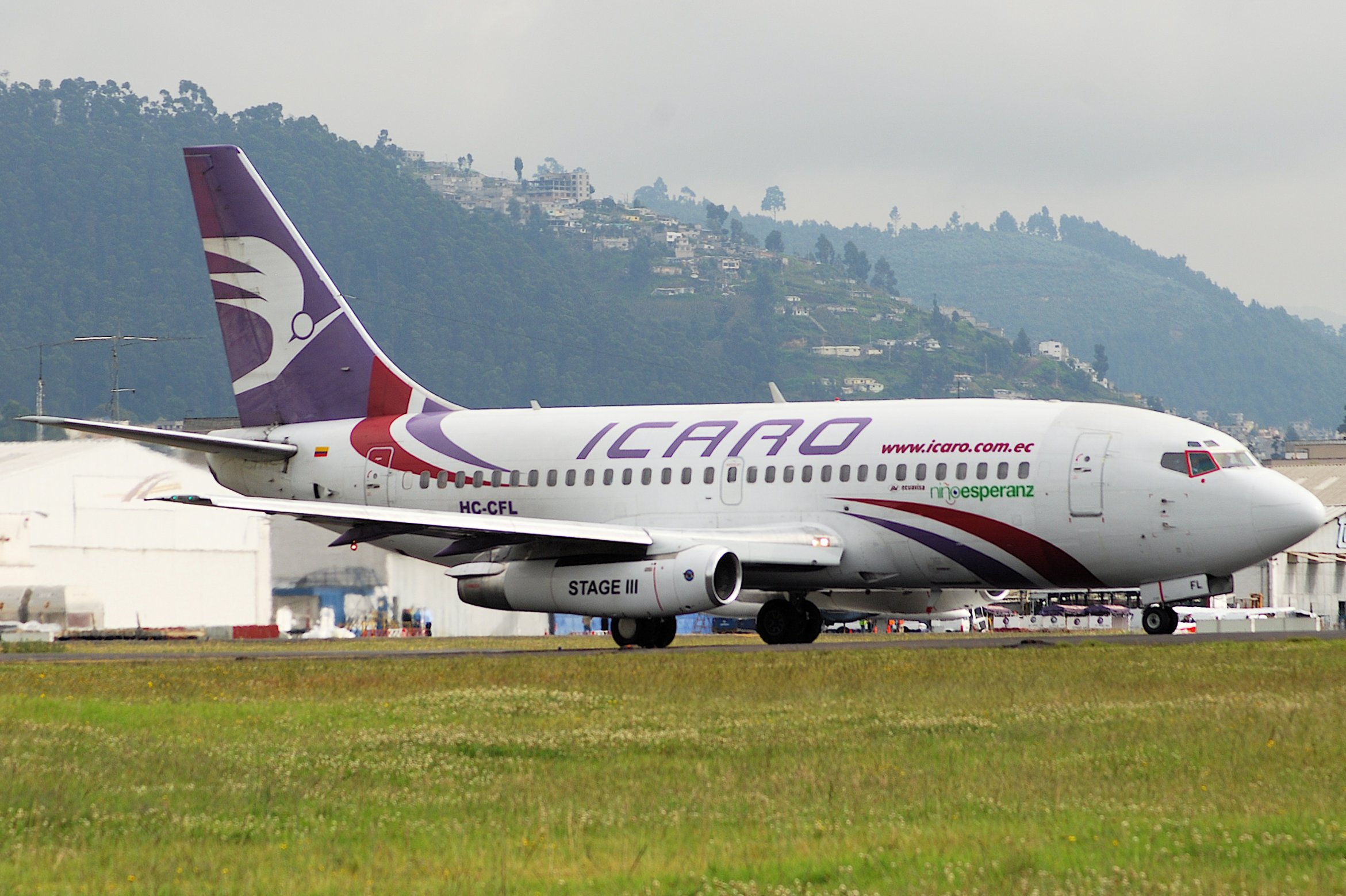
An Icaro Air Boeing 737-200 at the Old Mariscal Sucre International Airport in 2008

The company was founded on September 21, 1971, and commenced operations with two Cessna 150, with which what would later be one of the largest aviation companies in Ecuador was started.

In 1984, Icaro Air obtained from the aeronautical authority, a new operating permit in addition to those already existing up to that moment, this permit was granted in order that the company could carry out specialized aerial work operations with helicopters. To carry out operations with external cargo and passenger transport as well. For this, the airline concluded a joint venture with Heli Union based in Paris, France.

In 1996, Icaro Airentered the business of supplying aviation fuels as a Distributor and later as a marketer, approved by the respective regulatory entity. Icaro Air has served important clients for more than a decade. In 1997 Icaro acquired a Bell 206 L-3 helicopter and later in 1998, it incorporated a Bell 206 L-4.

By the beginning of the new century, Icaro Air had been strongly consolidated in the service of charter flights and helicopters. However, growth projections continued to be sustained for all existing areas except for the Pilots' school. A perspective was envisaged for the development of new business lines such as: Courier and cargo service and what would be the largest project developed up to that time, to make the company the second largest airline in the country.

=== Bankruptcy ===
The company went into liquidation on June 20, 2011, when it asked the Superintendency of Companies of Ecuador for its dissolution. The frequencies to Guayaquil and Galapagos were also revoked.

=== Plans for restart ===
Icaro Air had two clear plans to reactivate itself and solve the causes that, according to the Superintendency of Companies, led to its official dissolution.

Operation within Cuba with the company Aerocaribbean on June 20, 2011, Icaro signed in Havana, a lease contract with the airline Aerocaribbean, with which Icaro would provide a Boeing 737-200 with Ecuadorian crew included under the wet lease modality, in order to cover the regular domestic and international operation of Aerocaribbean. This operation required the authorization of the National Civil Aviation Council of Ecuador, chaired by Mr. Carlos Jácome Utreras, who prohibited such authorization from being granted to Icaro.

== Destinations ==
- Colombia
  - Bogotá (El Dorado International Airport)
  - Cali (Alfonso Bonilla Aragón International Airport)
  - Leticia (Alfredo Vásquez Cobo International Airport)
- Curaçao
  - Willemstad (Curaçao International Airport)
- Ecuador
  - Cuenca (Mariscal Lamar International Airport)
  - El Coca (Francisco de Orellana Airport)
  - Esmeraldas (Colonel Carlos Concha Torres Airport)
  - Manta (Eloy Alfaro International Airport)
  - Guayaquil (José Joaquín de Olmedo International Airport)
  - Manta (Eloy Alfaro International Airport)
  - Quito (Old Mariscal Sucre International Airport) Hub

== Fleet ==
The Icaro Air fleet consisted of the following aircraft and helicopters (June 2011):

Icaro Air fleet
Aircraft	In service	Orders	Passengers	Notes
Bell 212	1	—	13	
Boeing 737-200	1	—	112	Leased from Safair
Boeing CH-47	1	—	(cargo)	
Eurocopter AS350	2	—	6	
Total	5	—		

Historic fleet included:

- Bell 206 L-3
- Bell 206 L-4
- Boeing 737-200C
- Cessna 150
- Cessna 172
- Cessna 182
- Cessna T-41D Mescalero
- de Havilland Canada DHC-6 Twin Otter
- de Havilland Canada Dash 8-200
- Beechcraft 1900D
- Fokker F28 Fellowship
- Piper PA-23
- Piper PA-28

== Accidents and incidents ==
- On September 22, 2008, a Fokker F28 Fellowship (registered HC-CDT), on its flight from Quito to El Coca, aborted takeoff due to an alarm fire in the front cargo compartment. The plane could not stop in time, it went off the runway and hit the ILS antenna at the north end of the Old Mariscal Sucre International Airport. There were no fatalities among the 62 passengers and 4 crew members.
