= TANS Perú Flight 222 =

2003 aviation accident in Peru

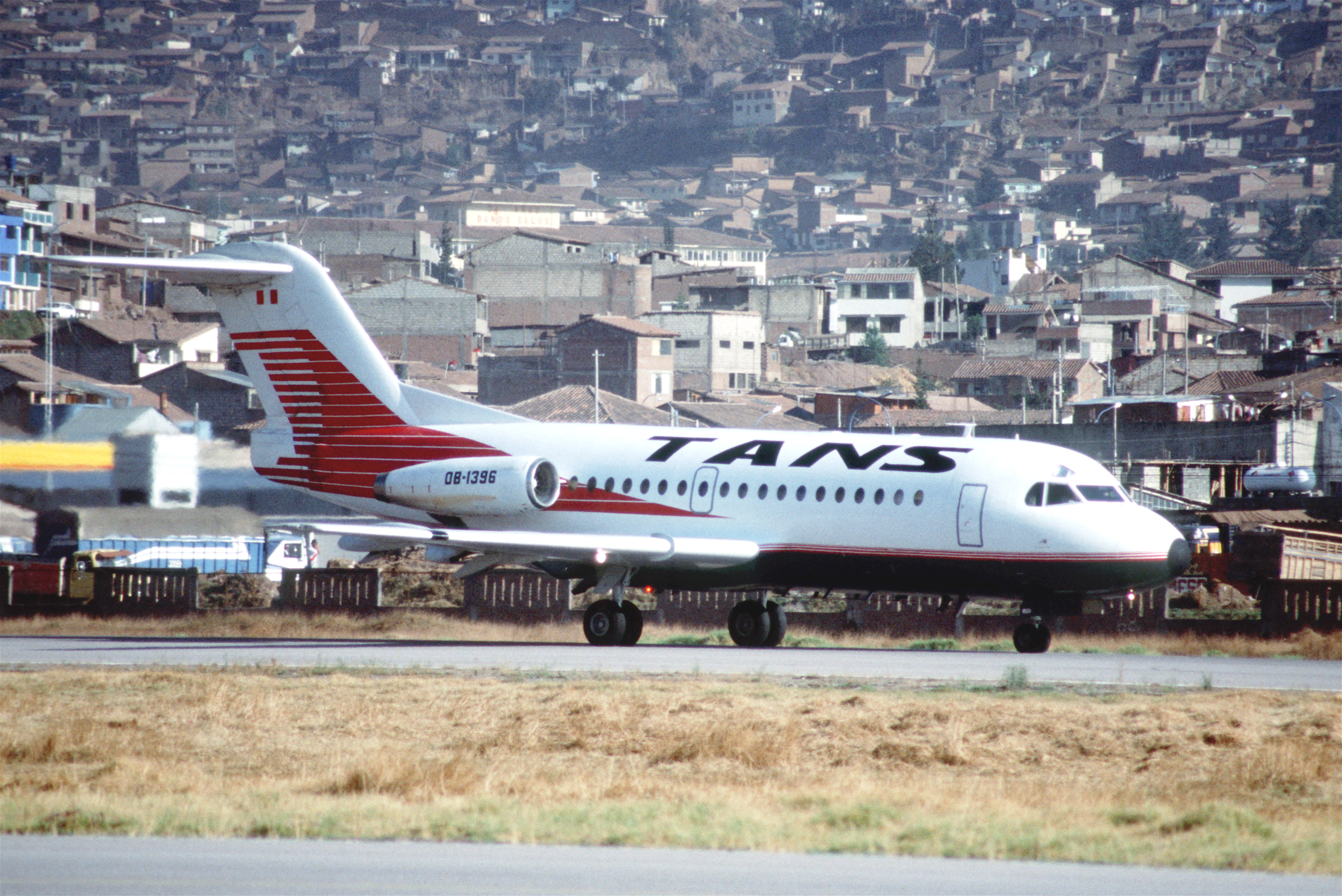
- OB-1396, the aircraft involved in the accident, pictured in 2000

Accident
- Date: 9 January 2003
- Summary: Controlled flight into terrain due to pilot error and loss of situational awareness
- Site: Chachapoyas, Peru; 6°01′25″S 078°02′50″W

Aircraft
- Aircraft type: Fokker F28-1000 Fellowship
- Operator: TANS Perú
- IATA flight No.: TJ222
- ICAO flight No.: ELV222
- Call sign: AEREOS SELVA 222
- Registration: OB-1396
- Flight origin: Jorge Chávez International Airport, Lima, Peru
- Stopover: FAP Captain José Abelardo Quiñones González International Airport
- Destination: Chachapoyas Airport
- Occupants: 46
- Passengers: 41
- Crew: 5
- Fatalities: 46
- Survivors: 0

TANS Peru Flight 222 was a domestic passenger flight from Lima, Peru to Chachapoyas with a stopover at Chiclayo, which crashed on 9 January 2003. The flight was operated by a Fokker F28-1000 Fellowship short range airliner. The aircraft crashed into the side of a hill while on approach to Chachapoyas Airport. All 46 passengers and crew aboard were killed in the deadliest crash in the airline's history.

An investigation led by Peru's air accident investigation body, the Ministry of Transport and Communications determined the primary cause of the crash was multiple crew errors including poor crew communication and overconfidence.

== Accident ==
Flight 222 departed FAP Captain José Abelardo Quiñones González International Airport, Chiclayo, at 08:17 local time and was cleared to flight level 190 on a heading of 075. At 08:32 the flight turned left to a heading of 060 and four minutes later began a descent to flight level 130. At 08:41 the speed brakes were deployed slowing the aircraft from 280 to 210 knots (520 to 390 km/h; 320 to 240 mph). Fifty seconds later the crew initiated a right turn to heading 135 to line up with runway 13 at Chachapoyas Airport. At 08:46 the Fokker crashed into the vertical face of a hill known as Cerro Collorque at an altitude of 3,450 metres (11,320 ft), just 35 metres (115 ft) below the summit. Rescue teams didn't find the wreckage until two days later. None of the occupants survived as the plane was pulverized by the crash.

== Aircraft ==
The aircraft involved was a Dutch-built Fokker F28-Mk1000 twin-engine short-range jet airliner manufactured in 1975, with aircraft registration OB-1396. At the time of the accident, the aircraft had accumulated 3,127 hours of flight time.

== Investigation ==
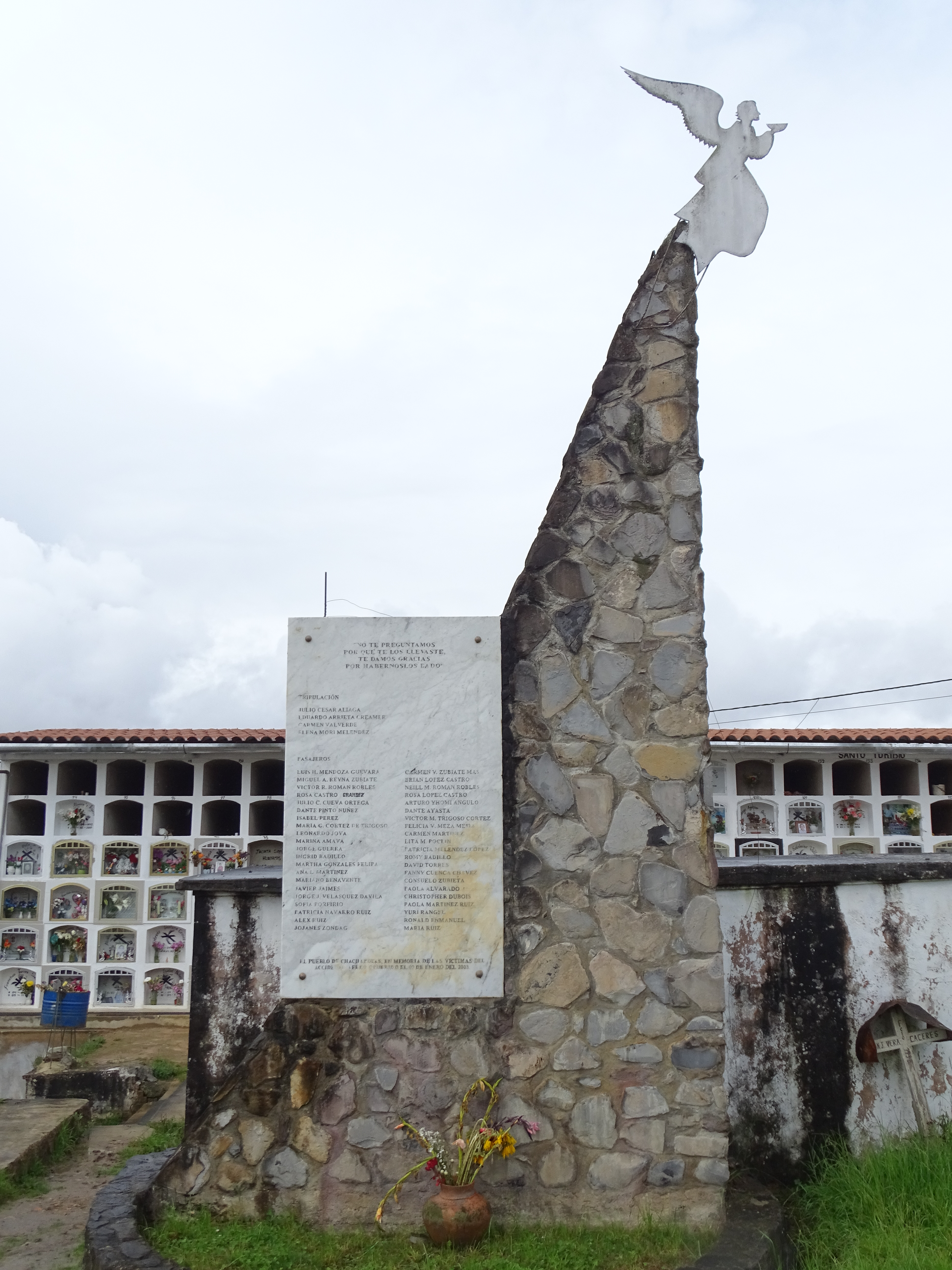
Memorial for TANS Perú Flight 222 in Chachapoyas cemetery

The Peruvian Ministry of Transport and Communications commenced an investigation, which began shortly after the crash. Both the cockpit voice recorder (CVR) and flight data recorder (FDR) were recovered. Examination of the CVR revealed the crew was over confident and failed to follow published procedures. The landing check list was not followed and communication between the crew was poor.

Chachapoyas Airport has a VHF omnidirectional range (VOR) so the crew knew in what direction the airport was, however no distance measuring equipment (DME) was available so they could not be sure how far from the runway they were. In conditions of very poor visibility the flight began the descent too early leading to impact with a hill side approximately 10 miles north of the airport.

The official report states controlled flight into terrain due to "complacency" and "the lack of effective communication" between the crew as the most probable primary cause of the accident. A contributing factor could have been the death of the co-pilot's father four days before the accident flight, possibly distracting him. The investigators also found the crew's work environment to be unsatisfactory due to constant management changes and lack of wages and bonuses paid.

== See also ==
- TANS Perú Flight 204
