= Chachapoyas Airport =

Airport in Peru

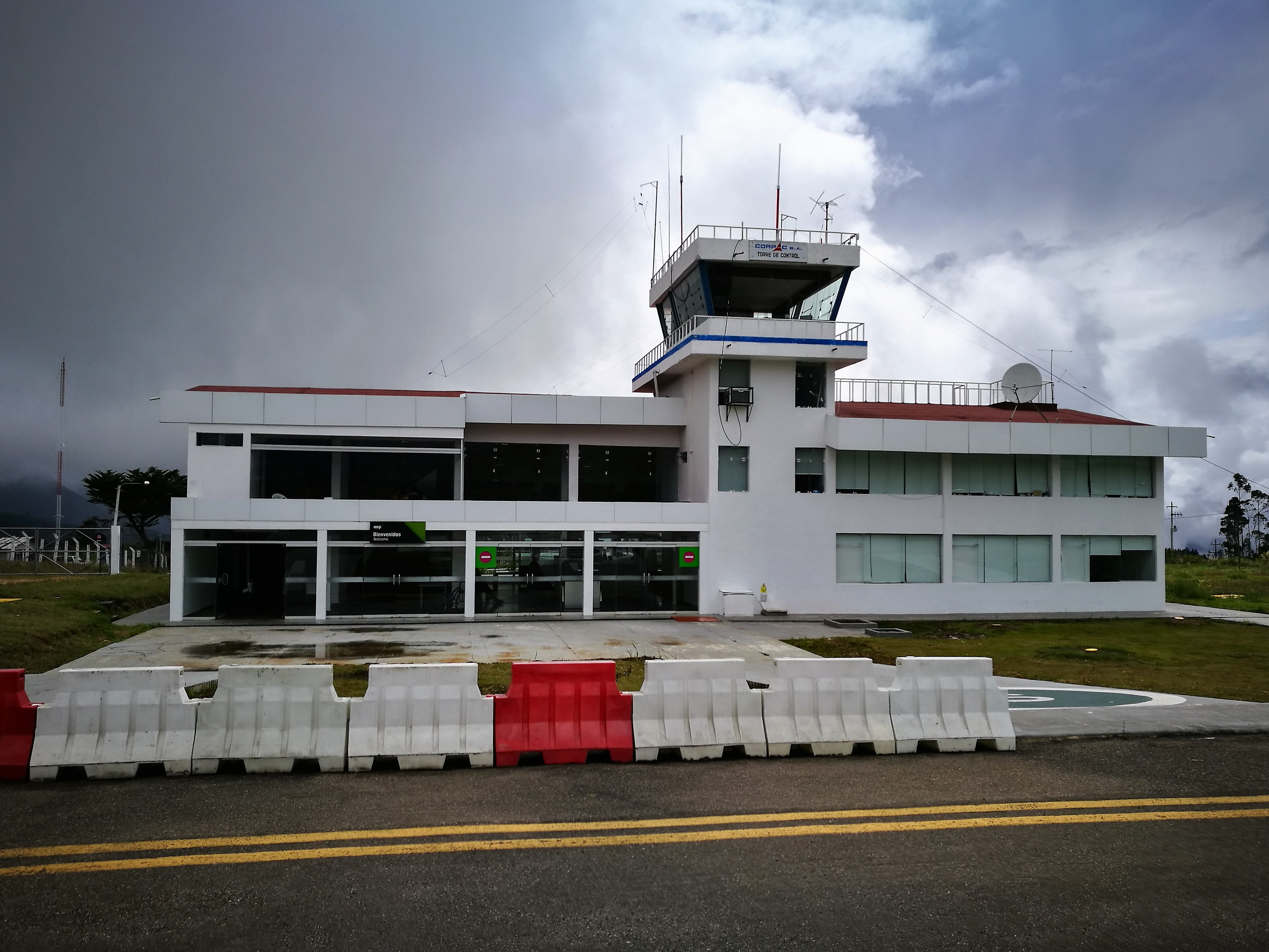
- IATA: CHH; ICAO: SPPY

Summary
- Airport type: Public
- Operator: ADP
- Serves: Chachapoyas
- Elevation AMSL: 8,333 ft / 2,540 m
- Coordinates: 6°12′05″S 77°51′25″W

Map
- Location of the airport in Peru

Runways
Direction	Length		Surface
Direction	m	ft	Surface
13/31	2,100	6,890	Asphalt
- Sources: GCM

Chachapoyas Airport (IATA: CHH, ICAO: SPPY), is an airport serving the city of Chachapoyas in the Amazonas Region of Peru. The runway is on a mesa north of the city, with steep drop-offs on either end.

== Airlines and destinations ==
The following airlines serve the airport:

Airlines	Destinations
Atsa Airlines	Lima

== Accidents and incidents ==
- On January 9, 2003, TANS Perú Flight 222 crashed into a mountain while attempting to land at Chachapoyas. All 46 passengers aboard the Fokker F-28 died.

== See also ==
- Transport in Peru
- List of airports in Peru
