= Gatari Air Service =

Indonesian charter airline

IATA	ICAO	Call sign
-	GHS	GATARI
- Founded: 1983
- Ceased operations: 2017
- Hubs: Halim Perdanakusuma International Airport; Sultan Aji Muhammad Sulaiman Airport; Wamena Airport
- Focus cities: Boven Digoel and Batam
- Fleet size: 1
- Parent company: PT. Gatari Hutama Air Service
- Headquarters: Jakarta, Indonesia
- Key people: Hutomo Mandala Putra

Gatari Air Service is a charter Indonesian airline which commenced operations in 1983. It was successful during the mid- and late 1980s, but has since declined in size after repaying several debts and having several aircraft seized and the airline has been suspended since 2017.

== History ==
Gatari was founded in 1983 with six Bell 412 helicopters; 80 per cent of the company was owned by Tommy Suharto, while the remaining 20 per cent belonged to Bob Hasan. The company was part of the Humpuss Group. Its charter acquisition cost Rp 100 million. Most of its clientele originated from the oil industry, and most of its pilots and mechanics were non-Indonesians. After the oil boom in 1985 the company's profits increased greatly, peaking at US$17 million in 1985 before falling to US$13 million in 1986. By 1988 they had surpassed seven other local charter agencies, giving training to pilots at the Freeport-McMoRan branch in Papua, and assisting the Indonesian Air Force with its exercises.

Because of these falling profits, Gatari diversified to include chartered flights for tourists and the wood industry throughout Indonesia, including in Sulawesi, Java, and Borneo. They also began hiring more Indonesian pilots and maintenance crews. By 1990 they had a total of 38 aircraft, mostly helicopters, and in 1991 they acquired a Bombardier 601-3A for US$17 million. The company eventually owned three Boeing 747s, but these were sold in 1999 to repay a debt.

In 1992 the company struck a five-year deal with the Ministry of Forestry and Plantations, maintaining twelve helicopters for the ministry, to be returned in 1999. Beginning in May 2000, the Prosecutor General's Office under Marzuki Darusman began looking into possible ill dealings between the ministry and Gatari, implicating Sudjono Suryo of the ministry and President Director Kabul Riswanto of Gatari. The case involved fraud of Rp 23.3 billion and the misuse of public funds; Gatari argued that the ministry had not kept its part of the bargain and had caused financial losses to the company. In October 2000 the prosecutor general's office seized three helicopters from the company, two of which were in too poor condition to fly.

In 2002 Gatari was one of several helicopter chartering agencies available in Jakarta, charging US$2,250 per hour. Its numbers have since diminished, and as of 2007 Gatari has a fleet of five, with two Indonesian pilots.

== Fleet ==
=== Current fleet ===
The Gatari Air Service fleet includes the following aircraft (as of August 2017):

Gatari Air Service fleet
Aircraft	In fleet	Orders	Passengers
ATR 42-500	1		
Total	1		

=== Former fleet ===
The airline fleet previously included the following aircraft in 2016:

- 1 further ATR 42-500

In 2007 the Gatari fleet included the following aircraft:

Gatari fleet
Aircraft	In fleet	Orders	Passengers
Bell 212	2	0	13
MBB/Kawasaki BK-117-B1	1	0	5
Fokker F28 Fellowship	2	0	85
Total	5	0	
