= Rolls-Royce RB.203 Trent =

1960s British turbofan aircraft engine

RB.203 Trent
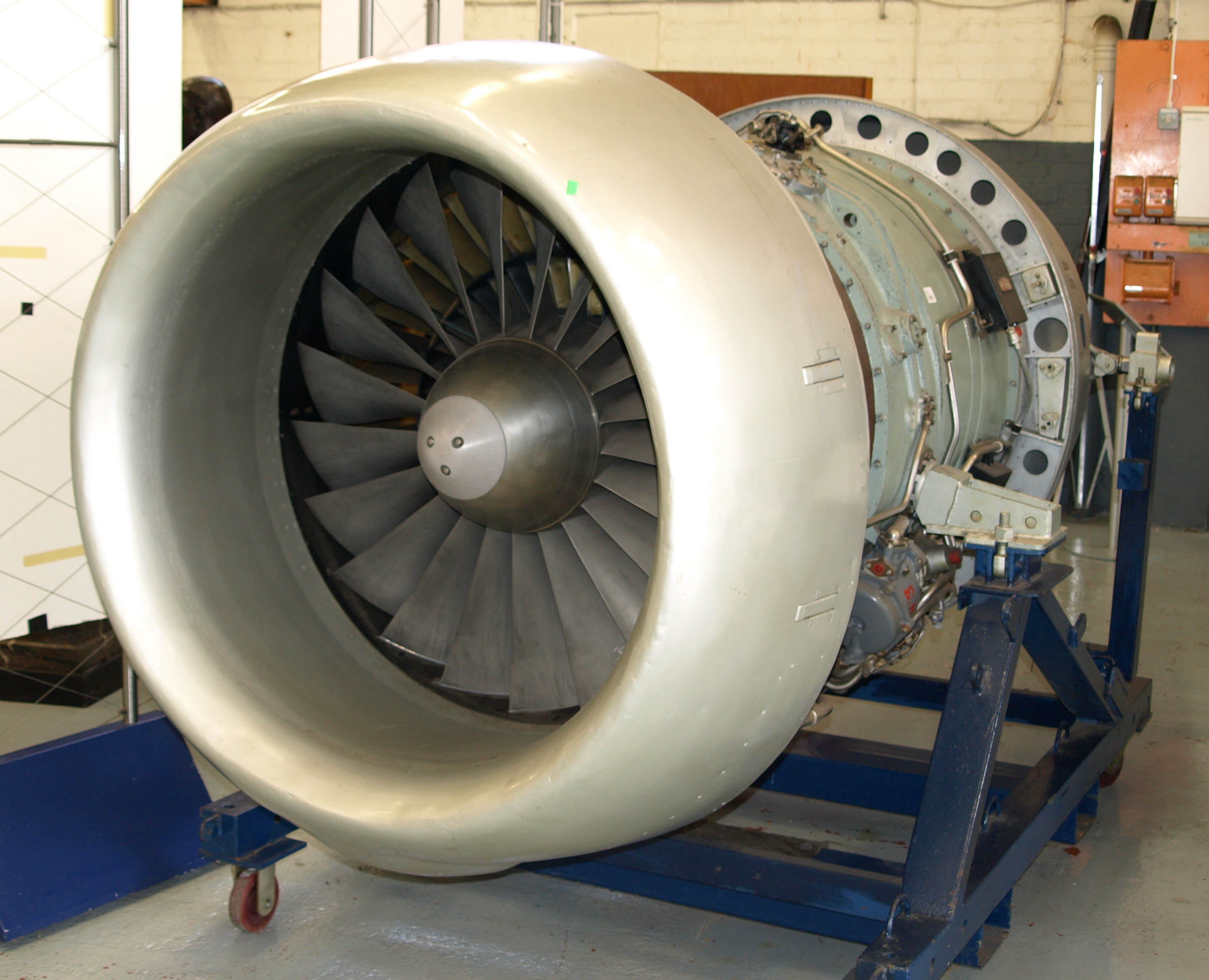
- Rolls-Royce RB.203 Trent on display at the Rolls-Royce Heritage Trust, Derby
- Type: Turbofan
- Manufacturer: Rolls-Royce Limited
- First run: December 1967
- Major applications: Fairchild Hiller FH-228 (intended); Hawker Siddeley HS.136 (intended); Convair 660 (intended), Saab 107 (intended)

The Rolls-Royce RB.203 Trent was a British medium-bypass turbofan engine of around 10,000lb thrust designed for production in the late 1960s, bearing no relation to the earlier Rolls-Royce RB.50 Trent turboprop or the later high-bypass Rolls-Royce Trent turbofan.

== Design and development ==
The RB.203 was a private venture engine built on the core of the Rolls-Royce Turbomeca Adour turbofan used in the SEPECAT Jaguar and the later Hawker Siddeley Hawk. The first three-spool engine, it was intended as a civilian replacement for the earlier Rolls-Royce Spey.

The RB.203 Trent was a member of an Advanced Technology Engine family of engines with thrusts covering a range from the RB.203 of just under 10,000 pounds-force (44,000 N) to the RB.207 of up to 60,000 pounds-force (270,000 N). The engine designs were launched at the SBAC Farnborough Airshow in September 1966. The Advanced Technology Engine RB.203 embraced the new scalable technologies such as the three-spool architecture, a high pressure annular combustor, the extensive use of composites throughout the low pressure compressor and engine casing, air-cooled turbine blading, squeeze-film bearings and a structurally integrated duct, the gearbox driven from the high pressure shaft and located in the nacelle.

The Trent RB.203 design objectives were:

- Lighter, more compact powerplant
- Improved fuel consumption
- Reduced number of parts, resulting in cheaper manufacturing costs and ease of overhaul
- Use of established turbine entry temperatures
- Adequate growth potential.

The engine was aimed primarily at the short-haul market as a Spey replacement. Specific fuel consumption was projected to be better than the then current engines and noise reduction was also a design feature. The Trent was expected to better FAA noise proposals by a considerable margin. Advanced components, which had between 15 years and 10 million service hours, promised long life, reduced weight, reduced vibration and a reduction in manufacturing costs.

The RB203 successfully ran for the first time on 18 December 1967. As the first in the family of Advanced Technology Engines the RB.203 Trent led the testing and the development of the RB.207 and the RB.211. The Trent was ordered by Fairchild Hiller to power the FH-228 short haul airliner. A key technology introduced on the RB.203 Trent was its structurally integrated nacelle, also referred to as a power plant.

== Specifications ==
Data from Flight International.

==== General characteristics ====
- Type: Three-spool medium bypass turbofan
- Length: 82.2 in (208.8 cm)
- Diameter: 38.7 in (98.3 cm)
- Dry weight: 1,751 lb (794 kg)

==== Components ====
- Compressor: Single-stage fan, four-stage intermediate pressure, five-stage high pressure
- Combustors: Annular chambers
- Turbine: Single-stage high pressure, single-stage intermediate, two-stage low pressure

==== Performance ====
- Maximum thrust: 9,730 lbf (43.3 kN)
- Overall pressure ratio: 16:1
- Bypass ratio: 3:1
- Air mass flow: 300 lb/s (140 kg/s)
- Thrust-to-weight ratio: 5.55:1

== See also ==
Comparable engines

- Rolls-Royce/SNECMA M45H

Related lists

- List of aircraft engines
