= Turkish Airlines Flight 345 =

1975 aviation accident

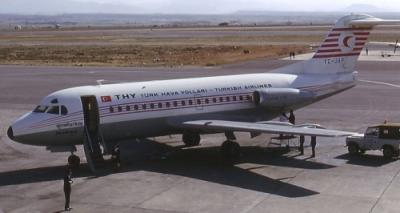
- TC-JAP, the aircraft involved in the accident

Accident
- Date: 30 January 1975
- Summary: Controlled flight into terrain during go-around
- Site: Sea of Marmara, Turkey; 40.7472°N 28.666°E
- Accident location shown with a cross within the Marmara region

Aircraft
- Aircraft type: Fokker F28-1000 Fellowship
- Aircraft name: Bursa
- Operator: Turkish Airlines
- IATA flight No.: TK345
- ICAO flight No.: THY345
- Call sign: TURKISH 345
- Registration: TC-JAP
- Flight origin: İzmir Cumaovası Airport, İzmir, Turkey
- Destination: Istanbul Yeşilköy Airport, Istanbul, Turkey
- Occupants: 42
- Passengers: 38
- Crew: 4
- Fatalities: 42
- Survivors: 0

Turkish Airlines Flight 345 was a scheduled domestic passenger flight operated by a Fokker F28-1000 Fellowship from İzmir Cumaovası Airport to Istanbul Yeşilköy Airport that crashed into the Sea of Marmara on 30 January 1975 during approach. It was the second worst accident involving a Fokker F28 and third deadliest aviation accident in Turkey at that time.

Coincidentally, the worst accident involving a Fokker F28 was when a sister ship to this aircraft, operating Turkish Airlines Flight 301, crashed almost exactly one year earlier, in January 1974.

== Background ==
The aircraft operating Flight 345 was a Fokker F28-1000 Fellowship, registered as TC-JAP, which made its first flight in 1972. Since then, it had accumulated 3713 flying hours in 5062 flight cycles. Flight 345 took off from İzmir Cumaovası Airport at around 18:00 EET (20:00 UTC) for a 40-minute flight to Istanbul Yeşilköy Airport with 38 passengers and 4 crew members on board.

== Accident ==
At 18:39, the aircraft touched down on the runway at Istanbul Yeşilköy Airport, but an electrical power failure at the airport at that moment forced the crew to initiate a missed approach. Twenty-two seconds after the failure, the emergency generator restored the runway lights. The pilot elected to remain VFR at an altitude of under 240 metres (790 ft). At 18:43, the crew asked for permission to land while positioning for another approach. Because another aircraft was about to take off, air traffic control ordered Flight 345 to fly an extended downwind leg. When, at 18:53, air traffic control attempted to establish contact with Flight 345, it received no response.

It was determined that the aircraft crashed into the Sea of Marmara, although the wreckage was not located until several years later.

== Recovery ==
The relatives of the victims continuously demanded, without success, the recovery of the wreckage and the bodies of the victims from the sea floor. A 3 by 3 m (9.8 by 9.8 ft) 200 kg (440 lb) portion from the rear fuselage with five window frames was recovered on March 17, 2009, by shrimp trawling fishermen off the Avcılar-Florya coast. The wreckage was handed over to Turkish Airlines after inspection by Stuart Kline, an American historian of aviation living in Turkey.
